= Military colours, standards and guidons =

Flags, coats of arms, and other signals used to aid in military navigation

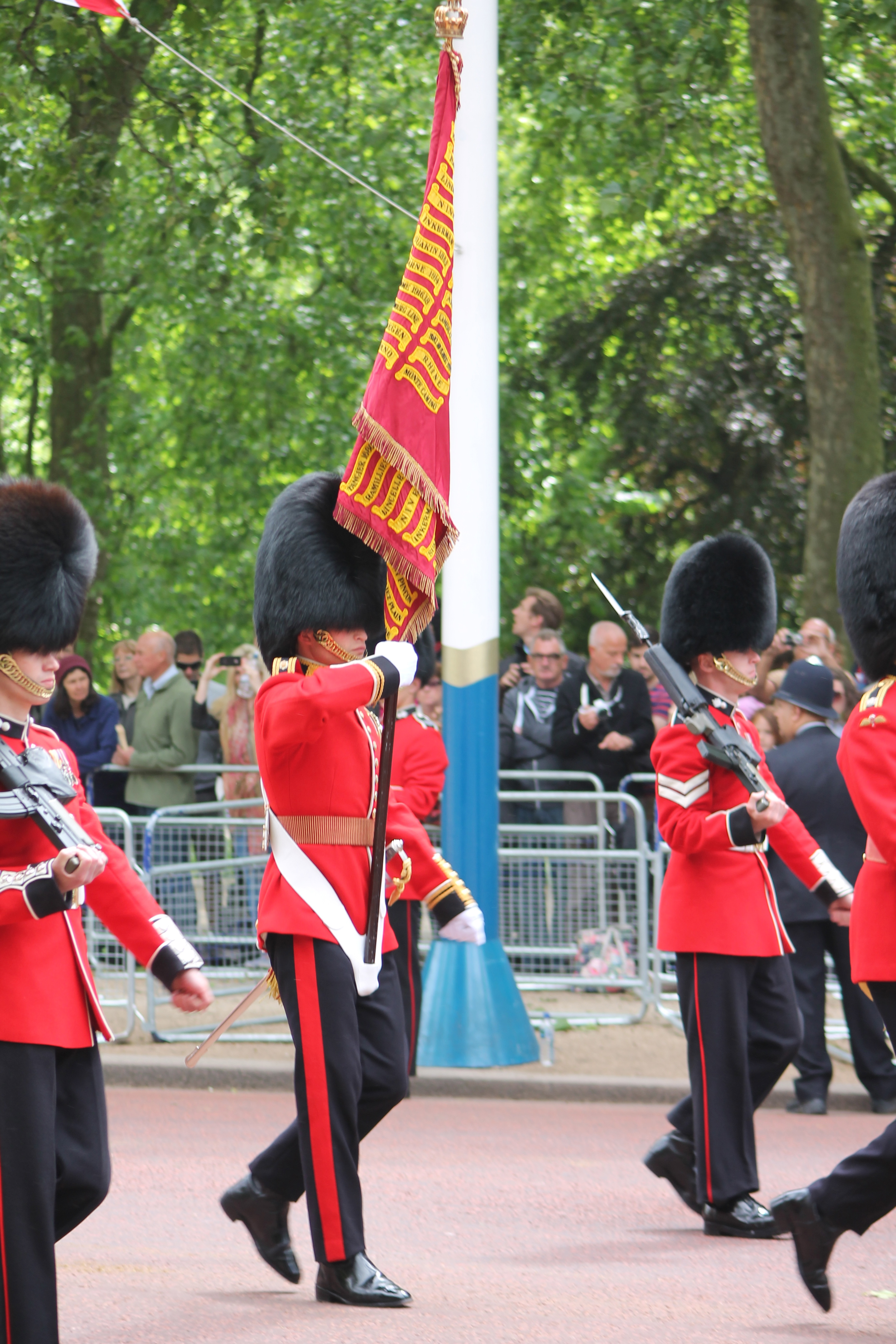
Queen's colour of the Grenadier Guards in 2013

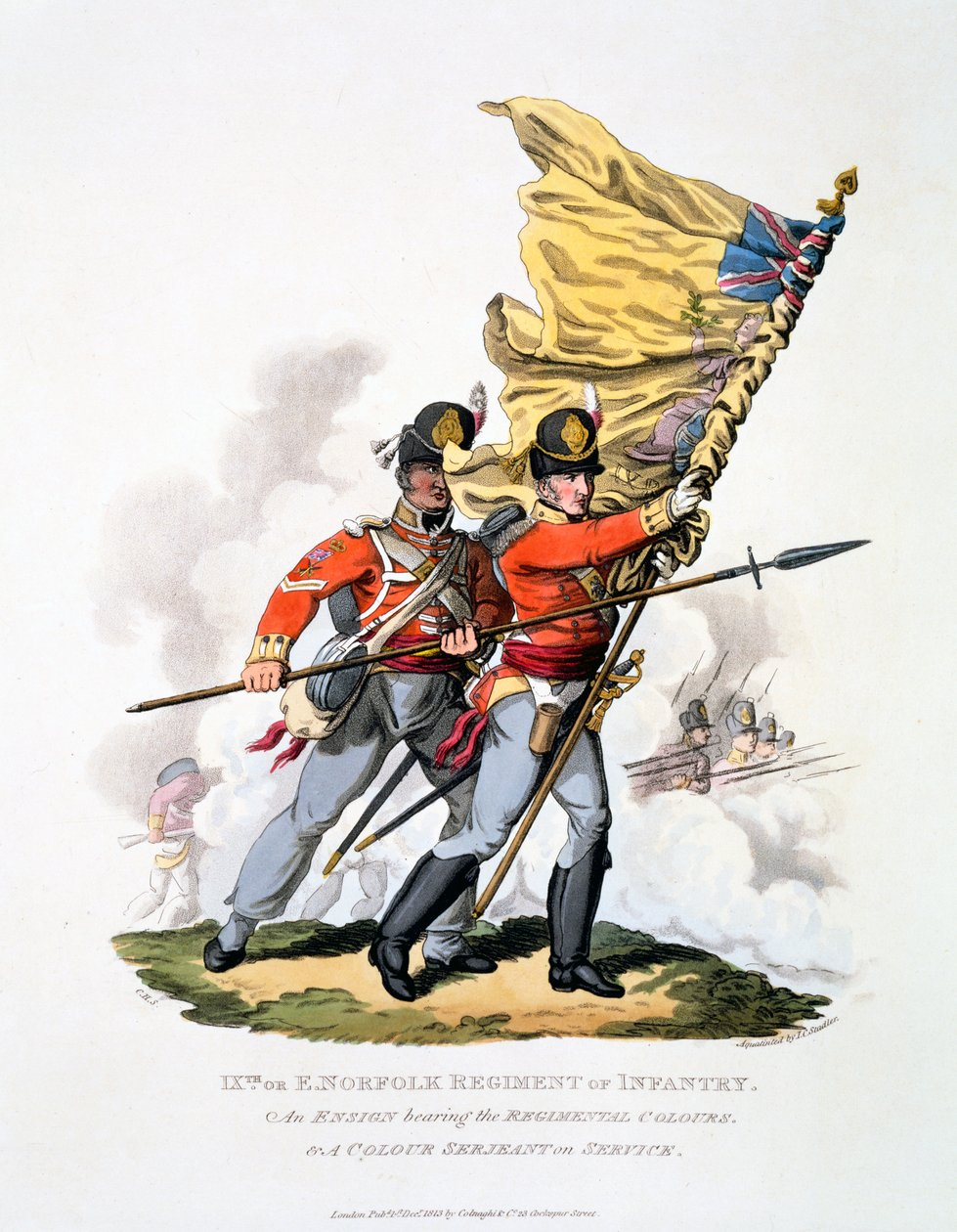
In the age of line tactics, the unit colour was an important rallying point for infantry soldiers.

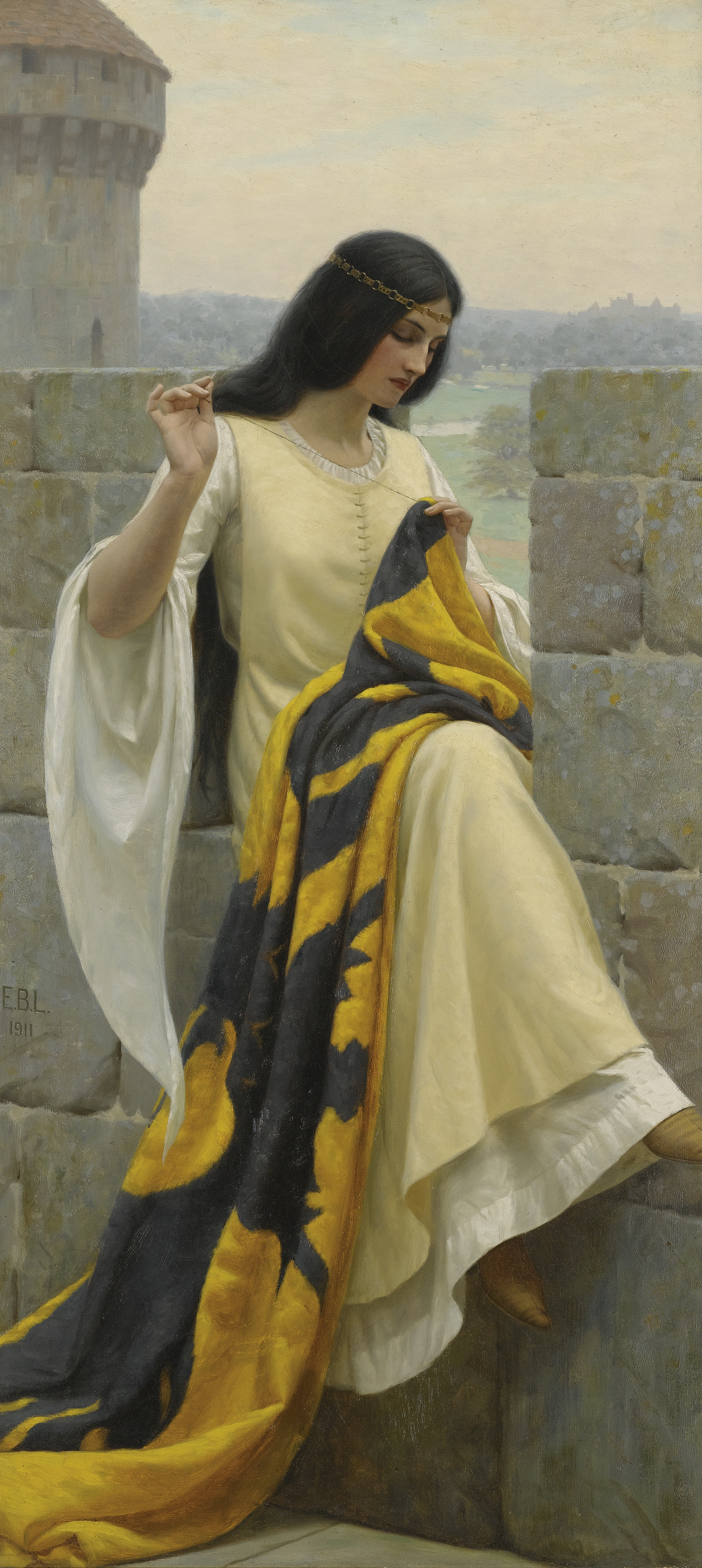
Stitching the Standard by Edmund Leighton (1911), oil on canvas.

In military organizations, the practice of carrying colours, standards, flags, or guidons, both to act as a rallying point for troops and to mark the location of the commander, is thought to have originated in Ancient Egypt some 5,000 years ago. The armies of the Roman Empire also used vexilla, battle standards reading SPQR. It was formalized in the armies of Europe in the High Middle Ages, with standards being emblazoned with the commander's coat of arms.

== General use ==
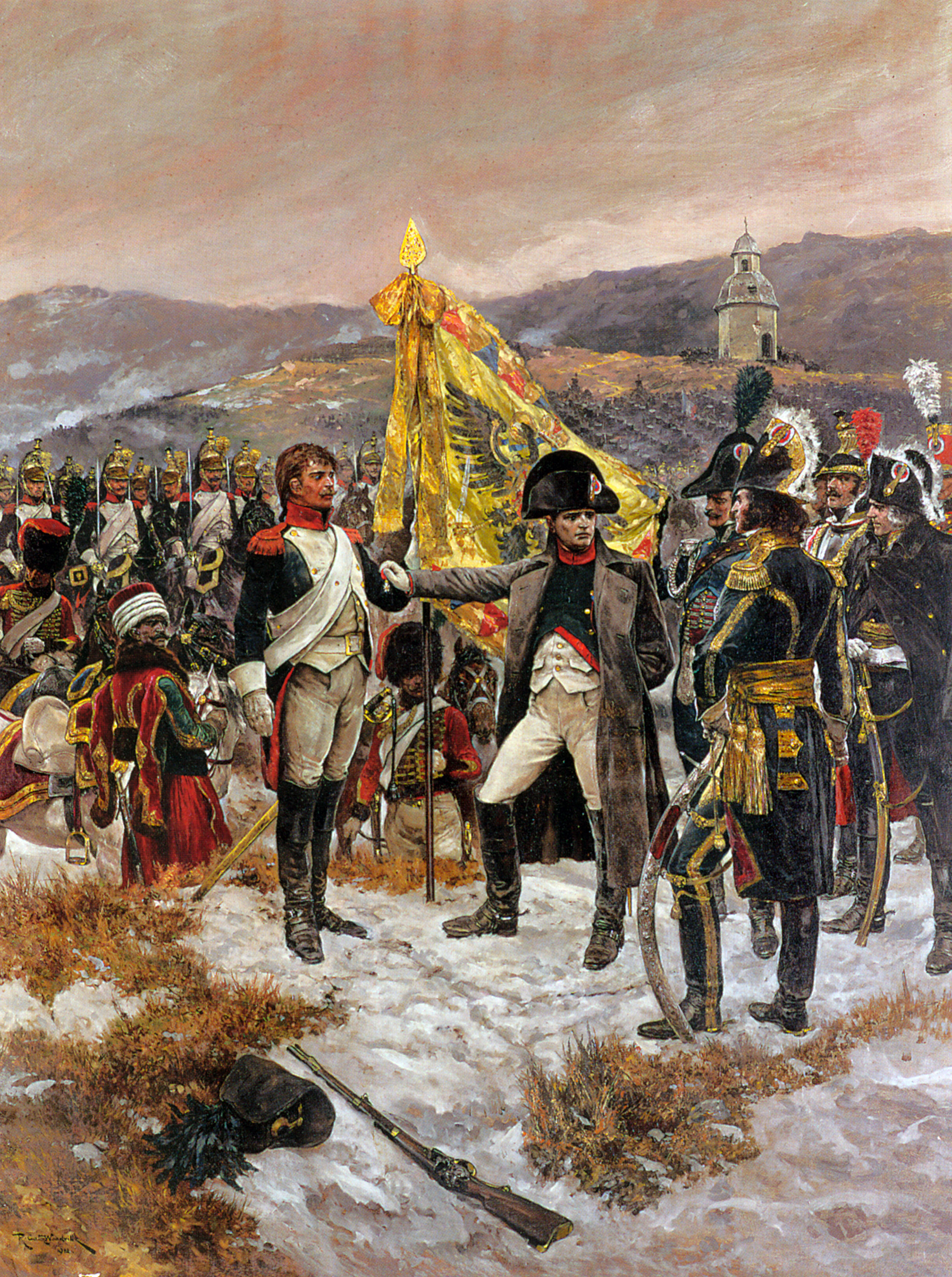
Napoleon I awarding the Legion d'Honneur to a dragoon for the capture of an Austrian regimental flag

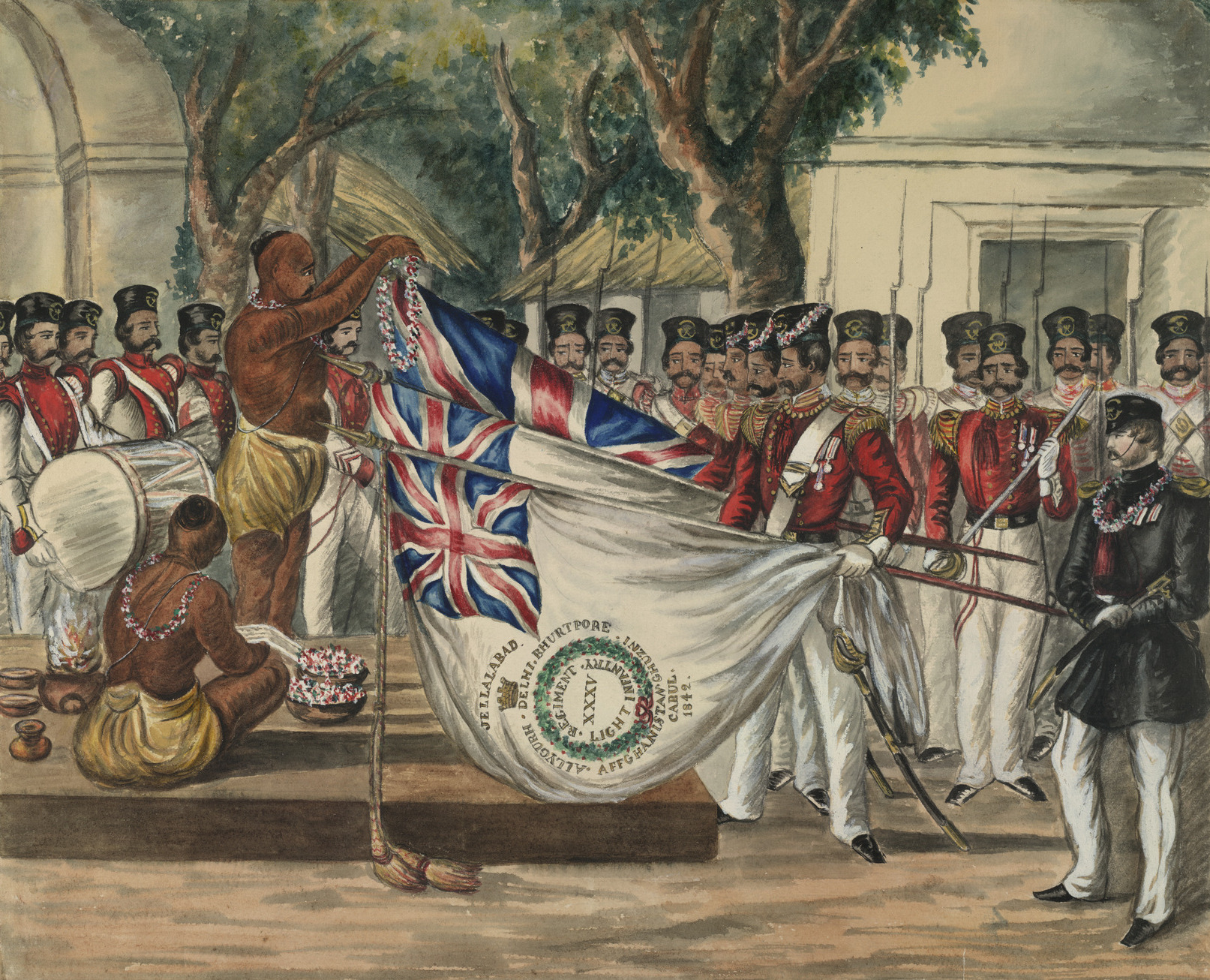
Hindu priests garlanding the colours of the 35th Bengal Light Infantry at a Presentation of Colours ceremony, c. 1847

Military colours originally had a practical use in battle. As armies became trained and adopted set formations, each regiment's ability to keep its formation was potentially critical to its success, and therefore its entire army's success. In the chaos of battle, due to the amount of dust and smoke on a battlefield, soldiers needed to be able to determine where their regiment was.

Regimental flags are generally awarded to a regiment by a head of state during a ceremony. They are therefore treated with respect as they represent the honour and traditions of the regiment. Colours may be inscribed with the names of battles or other symbols representing historical achievements (see battle honours).

Regiments tended to adopt "colour guards", composed of experienced or élite soldiers, to protect their colours. As a result, the capture of an enemy's standard was considered as a great feat of arms.

Standards and colours are never capriciously destroyed – when too old to use they are replaced and then laid up in museums, religious buildings and other places of significance to their regiment.

Due to the advent of modern weapons and subsequent changes in tactics, colours are no longer carried into battle but continue to be used at formal events.

== Colours ==
=== Asia ===
==== Cambodia ====
In Cambodia, the colours of the Royal Cambodian Armed Forces (RCAF) and other uniformed institutions follow British, US, and French practice.

Until 2022, what was essentially a large version of the flag of Cambodia with the unit name below in white in the bottom blue stripe was used as the King's colour of RCAF formations before being reassigned as the national colour for parades and ceremonies. In 2023, a new Chinese-derived design but also harking to the days of the old kingdoms on Cambodian territories, debuted – it is a unified design with the insignia of the unit or formation at the center and the unit name in Khmer below but with the colors differing per service:

- Royal Cambodian Army and Royal Gendarmerie of Cambodia: red
- Royal Cambodian Navy: navy blue
- Royal Cambodian Air Force: sky blue

==== China, People's Republic of (Mainland China) ====
Army flag of the People's Republic of China

The People's Liberation Army is the overall body for the entire armed forces of the People's Republic of China, and is represented by a single flag, which serves as a ceremonial colour for all regiments and larger formations. This is based on the national flag, but has instead of the four smaller gold stars the Chinese characters for the numerals '8' and '1', which stand for 1 August, the day in 1927 that the PLA was founded. When paraded, the flag is fringed in gold and mounted on a red-and-gold pole.

Each branch of the PLA has its own flag, based on the Army Flag (Banners of the PLA):

- Ground Forces: identical to the Army flag, but with the lower 40% coloured green.
- Navy: identical to the Army flag, but with the lower 40% has three blue and two white horizontal stripes of equal width.
- Air Force: identical to the Army flag, but with the lower 40% coloured air force blue.
- Rocket Forces: identical to the Army flag, but with the lower 40% being a gold stripe.

These, too, are not paraded publicly except with the same gold fringe as the Army flag.

Individual unit colours based on the PLA service colour would be introduced only from 2018 (and that, only on a test basis), when mobile contingents of units of the Northern Theater Command which took part in the joint military exercise "Vostok 2018" with the Russian Armed Forces carried red colours with the unit name on the white fringe nearest the flagpole. Test battle colours had been given to the People's Armed Police some years before the practice was adopted by the PLA Ground Forces on an experimental period. During the 1 October 2019 civil military parade marking the 70th anniversary of the People's Republic of China, a mobile colour guard unit debuted after many years the garrison colours awarded to every PLA formation and agency, which are red with the formation or agency name in Mandarin Chinese in white or gold lettering (but without the white fringe), with some colours bearing additional inscriptions bearing either battle honours or decorations awarded to the formation or agency concerned.

==== China, Republic of (Taiwan) ====
Army flag of the Republic of China

The army of the Republic of China (Taiwan) also has a single flag that it uses, which is red, with a banner of the Blue Sky with a White Sun in the centre. It has a red flagpole with silver spearhead finial and red tassels immediately underneath. Individual units use a variation of the Army Flag as their own identifying Colour; this features a white strip next to the hoist, which has the unit's name in black characters, as well as a golden fringe (as is the case since 1961 for all units of the Republic of China Armed Forces, but since 1947 were limited only to Army units above the regimental level). The army honour guard colour is in gold with the unit coat of arms in the centre.

The Republic of China Navy's colours were red but with the seal of the Navy in a dark blue canton in the centre until the 1980s, the honour guard company's colours only use both dark blue and the Navy seal, which are the same colours used today in other ROCN units.

For the Republic of China Marine Corps, its unit battle colours, since 1960, mirrors that of the USMC but since the 1980s the unit name is on the white stripe near the hoist (just as the rest of the armed forces, formerly it was on a scroll similar to the USMC's).

The colours used by the Republic of China Air Force are in sky blue with the air force seal in the centre (formerly it was red with the sky blue canton featuring the coat of arms, the old design only used today by the honour guard).

Units of the Republic of China Military Police, formerly using a blue colour, now use a brown colour with the ROCMP arms.

Units reporting to the Ministry of National Defence sport an orange colour with the coast arms of the Ministry in the centre. Garrison colours are in blue with the Kuomintang emblem, a wheat wreath and 3 interlocked circles in yellow, red and blue respectively. Reserve units carry a red colour while the Taiwan Reserve uses a green one.

Only the following military academies sport their colours as the ROCAF colour is used by the Republic of China Air Force Academy:

- Republic of China Military Academy
- Republic of China Naval Academy

In all events whenever the ROCAF is involved, the ROC flag is used as the National colour.

==== Indonesia ====
In Indonesia, the Colours of the Indonesian National Armed Forces, Indonesian National Police and other uniformed institutions are known as Panji-panji. The Panji-panji is carried and escorted by a colour guard known as "Pataka", an abbreviation from Pasukan Tanda Kehormatan in Indonesian.

===== National colour and service colours =====
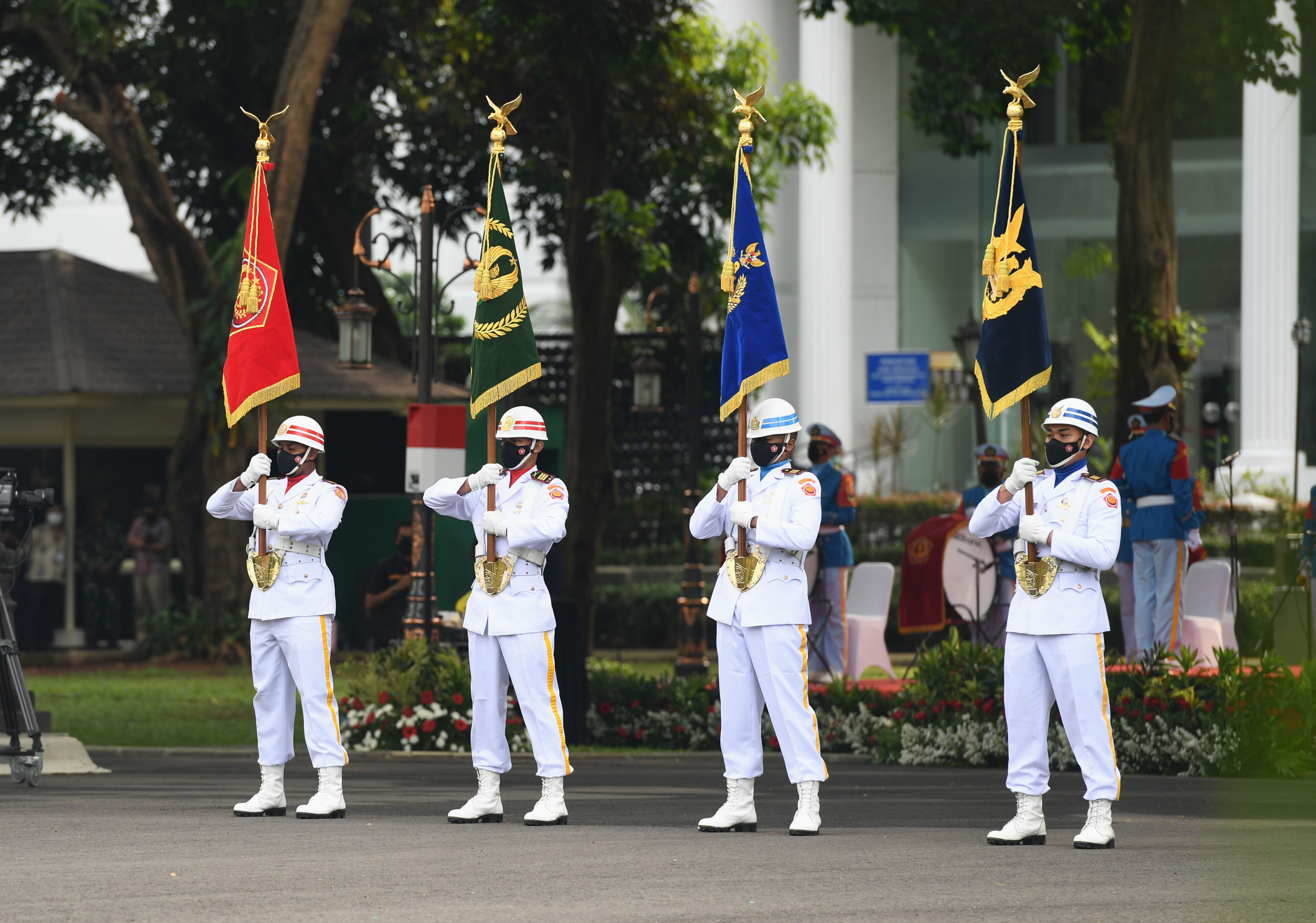
Indonesian National Armed Forces, Army, Navy, and Air Force colour guards

During graduation and passing out parades, whenever the enlistment or commissioning pledge is taken, the flag of Indonesia is used as a national colour.

Mostly seen in parades are the service colours of the Indonesian National Armed Forces or TNI, the Indonesian National Police and the Municipal Police units (known as the Panji-Panji Kesatuan/Lambang-Lambang Kesatuan). Within the TNI, service colours exist for all three service branches. Panji-panji means the military/service colours in Indonesian.

- Indonesian National Armed Forces Tri-Service Colour: Red with coat of arms on the obverse and the national coat of arms on the reverse
- Indonesian Army Colour: Green with coat of arms on the obverse
- Indonesian Navy Colour: Dark blue with coat of arms on the obverse
- Indonesian Air Force Colour: Sky blue with coat of arms on the obverse

Non-military:

- Indonesian National Police Colour: Black and the national coat of arms on the reverse
- Municipal Police Colour: Dark blue

===== Colours of commands and below =====
Tunggul and Pataka are terms used to identify colours below the command or service specialty level within the Armed Forces, National Police and Municipal Police. The former are for battalion/squadron level units and military territorial commands or equivalents, the latter for brigades/regiments, divisions/regional commands and service specialty and operational commands. They share a common design: the unit heraldic arms is featured in the obverse while the emblem of its reporting formation is featured in the reverse side. All colours are gold fringed and carry a Garuda finial based on the national arms.

Within the TNI, Police and Municipal Police, the speciality colours are:

- Green: Infantry, Army Corps of Engineers, Regional Military Commands, Operational and Administrative Commands, Agencies and Departments
- Red: Army Strategic Reserve Command, Army Special Force battalions and brigades, Reserve Component
- Black: Armour and Cavalry, Air Force Infantry, Raider Infantry (Airborne and Mechanized units inclusive), Municipal Police, Police
- Brown : Artillery and Air Defense Artillery, Indonesian Military Academy
- Gray: Logistics and Transportation, Military Police, Army Services
- Navy blue: Navy, inclusive of Fleet Forces and Military Sealift
- Ultramarine blue: Air Force
- Maroon: Mobile Brigade Corps (Police)
- Magenta: Marine Corps
- Violet: Army Aviation Command

==== Korea, Democratic People's Republic of (North Korea) ====
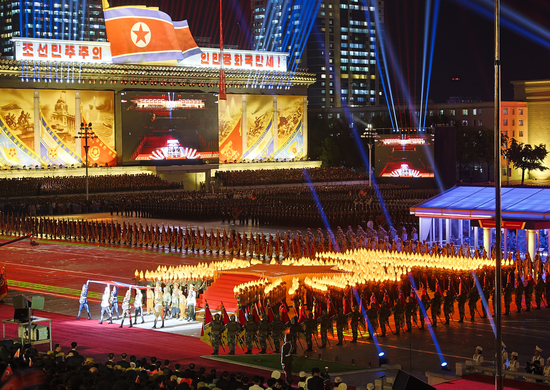
The KPA's flags decorated on a building during the 2023 Victory Day parade, and presented during the section for rising national flag.

The Korean People's Army is the overall body for the entire armed forces of the Democratic People's Republic of Korea. Until 1993 the KPA was represented by a single flag, which served as a ceremonial colour for all regiments, educational institutions and larger formations. The colour is on the basis of the national flag but with the national emblem replacing the star and on parades the colours were surrounded by gold fringe. The gold lettering in Hangul until 1961 was "For the independence of the motherland and the people" (조국의 독립과 인민을 위하여) or "For the freedom and independence of the Fatherland" (조국의 자유와 독립을 위하여, Guards units only), then replaced by "For the unification and independence of the Fatherland, and the freedom and happiness of the people" (조국의 통일, 독립과 인민의 자유와 행복을 위하여).

In 1993, as part of the 40th anniversary of the conclusion of the Korean War and the 45th since the founding of the DPRK, the old colour was replaced by the designs seen for over three decades in major holiday parades. All the colours shared the same reverse with the emblem of the Workers' Party of Korea (WPK) in gold and, save for the Worker-Peasant Red Guards, have identical gold letting in Hangul which states "Revolutionary armed forces of the Workers' Party of Korea, Korean People's Army [unit name] / No.425 unit (in ceremonies)" (조선로동당의 혁명적무장력인 조선인민군 제425 군부대), the 425 number honouring the date (25 April) of the 1932 foundation of the People's Anti-Japanese Guerrilla Army, whose lineage is continued by the current service, but with the same colours as in the obverse, which also shows the 4.25 mark in gold numbering. The Guards units also had its badge beneath the 4.25 mark. In 2023, from a meeting of the WPK Central Military Commission, a new amended design based on the 1992–93 templates was introduced for the KPA with the new motto "For the endless prosperity of the fatherland and the security of the people!" (조국의 무궁한 번영과 인민의 안녕을 위하여) or alternatively "For our Party's Central Committee, the heart of the Korean Revolution!" (조선혁명의 심장인 우리 당중앙위원회를 위하여, honour guards only), and the 4.25 mark was finally removed, with the date of the service branch or unit raising now replacing it. Guards formations retained their official emblem below the foundation date. The reverse of these colours was updated with the graphic pattern consist of a silhouette of the WPK headquarter and a red shield bearing the emblem of WPK in the middle, and additional motto "Let us defend the Party's Central Committee headed by Dear Comrade Kim Jong Un with all our lives!" (경애하는 김정은동지를 수반으로 하는 당중앙위원회를 목숨으로 사수하자!) at the top. These colours are in gold fringe when brought out in public parades in Pyongyang, the national capital, and during state visits by the honour guards of the Supreme Guard Command, which is an inter-service formation unlike the rest of the command whose personnel are drawn from the Ground Forces. The 1948–1961 design colours, since the celebrations of the 60th anniversary of the conclusion of the Korean War in 2013, have been brought out only by guards units and KPA battalions sporting historical dress uniforms of the 1940s and early 1950s, the 1948 colours have a gold Guards Badge outline in the reverse to denote Guards status of the unit's colour while the colours only use the 1948 arms and motto instead of the current one.

- KPA former colour until 1997: red with national emblem in gold – formerly the KPA emblem in gold (sheaves of wheat and a stylized dam with a red star surrounded by a gold circle with wreath below), former flag did not have motto in the obverse but only in the reverse, the gold Hangul motto read "For the unification and independence of the motherland, and the freedom and happiness of the people"
- KPA proper from 2023: red with a laurel wreath, a gold ring and a red star bearing the national emblem in gold, and the Hangul motto in gold above and below the emblem in the obverse, and name of the service in Hangul below the graphic pattern with WPK HQ, two swords and a shield bearing WPK emblem in the reverse, the gold Hangul motto on the obverse reading "For the endless prosperity of the fatherland and the security of the people!"
- Ground Forces 1993–2023 (also used as unofficial flag of the entire KPA): Colour in national flag colours but with national arms in gold – formerly the KPA emblem in gold – and gold Hangul motto "For the unification and independence of the motherland, and the freedom and happiness of the people" (조국의 통일, 독립과 인민의 자유와 행복을 위하여) in the obverse
  - Ground Forces 1993–1994 additional colour (also used as unofficial flag of the entire KPA) had gold Hangul motto on the top and bottom blue stripes reading "Let us defend the Party's Central Committee headed by Dear Comrade Kim Il Sung with our lives!" (경애하는 김일성동지를 수반으로 하는 당중앙위원회를 목숨으로 사수하자!) with the name of Kim Il Sung slightly enlarged, gold motto also used in the flags of the other branches
  - Ground Forces 1997–2011 additional colour (also used as unofficial flag of the entire KPA) had gold Hangul motto on the top and bottom blue stripes reading "Let us defend the headquarters of the revolution headed by the great Comrade Kim Jong Il with our lives!" (위대한 김정일동지를 수반으로 하는 혁명의 수뇌부를 목숨으로 사수하자!) with the name of Kim Jong Il slightly enlarged, gold motto also used in the flags of the other branches
  - Ground Forces 2012–2023 additional colour (also used as unofficial flag of the entire KPA): Colour in national flag colours but with KPA emblem in gold and gold Hangul motto on the top and bottom blue stripes reading "Let us defend the Party's Central Committee headed by the great Comrade Kim Jong Un with our lives!" (위대한 김정은동지를 수반으로 하는 당중앙위원회를 목숨으로 사수하자!) with the name of Kim Jong Un slightly enlarged, gold motto also used in the flags of the other branches
- Ground Forces from 2023: Colour in national flag colours but with a gold ring and a red star bearing the national emblem in gold, accomplished by acanthus leaves, the gold Hangul motto on the top and bottom blue stripes reading "For the endless prosperity of the fatherland and the security of the people!"
- Air Force 1993–2023: Emblem of KPA with wings (emblem updated in 2012), top large half in air force blue and small bottom half dark blue, with 6 alternating stripes (3 dark blue, 3 air force blue), formerly gold wings and a gold star above the emblem
- Air Force from 2023: Top small half in black and white, middle in air force sky blue and bottom in black divided by V-shaped stripes in white, pale blue, black and white, the middle also has a gold ring with five gold stars above and a gold wing below, a red star bearing the national emblem in gold, and accomplished with a silhouette of fighter jets
- Navy 1993–2023: Emblem of KPA with gold four anchor above, bicolour of white and navy blue with 5 alternating stripes between the large stripes (3 dark blue, 2 white) in the middle
- Navy from 2023: A gold ring with above and laurel wreath below, a red star bearing the national emblem in gold, bicolour of white and navy blue with 5 alternating stripes between the large stripes (3 dark blue, 2 white) in the middle and additional blue stripe in the top
- Strategic Forces (2018 colour): Green with emblem of the KPA and a larger wreath above a stylized top of a globe, with light yellow stripes below the globe
- Special Operations Forces (2018 colour): Dark Blue with emblem of the KPA and a larger wreath, with the Big Dipper below the 4.25 mark
- Honorary Cavalrymen since 2020: On the obverse side, white field with a red stripe at the top and 8 narrow stripes alternatively in white and red, and a red wide stripe at the bottom, in the middle there is a red WPK headquarter at the top, and a red shield with a golden WPK emblem and supported by two horses; on the reverse side the colours were inverted, and there is a golden WPK emblem in the middle.
- Missile Administration: Black with two gold stripes near top and bottom and stars in dark or sky blue shades, the emblem of the Missile Administration accomplished with a baroque decorative pattern and a silhouette of missiles, the gold Hangul motto on the top and bottom sections divided by gold stripes reading "For the defense of the Democratic People's Republic of Korea, and the security of its people!" (조선민주주의인민공화국의 안전과 인민의 안녕을 위하여)
- Military academies since 2023: Top large half in red, bottom small half in army green and topped by two narrow white stripes, a gold ring with a red star bearing the national emblem in gold
- Naval academy since 2025: Bicolour of navy blue and white with 5 alternating stripes between the large stripes (2 white, 2 dark blue) in the middle and a gold ring with a red star bearing the national emblem in gold in the middle
- Air force academy since 2025: Bicolour of black and gold and divided by V-shaped stripes (2 gold, 2 black),
- Revolutionary military schools until 2023: Red with KPA emblem and Hangul motto in gold lettering above and below
- Revolutionary military schools (2023 colour): Top small half in red and narrow gold stripe, middle in army green with four red stripes, bottom small half in red and topped by narrow gold stripe, a gold ring with a red star bearing the national emblem in gold
- Revolutionary military schools (2025 colour): Top half in red and bottom half in green, and divided by narrow stripes (3 red, 3 green), superimposed by a yellow Hangul motto "For Korea, study!" (조선을 위하여 배우자!) at the top, a school emblem at the middle, and the yellow school name at the bottom
- Worker-Peasant Red Guards: Red with service emblem (red star and gold wreath) in the centre and the Hangul motto in gold above and below the emblem in the obverse, and name of the service in Hangul below the WPK emblem in the reverse, from 1997 to 2011 the gold Hangul motto read "Let's us defend the leadership of the revolution led by the great Comrade Kim Jong Il with our lives!", from 2012 to 2023 it was "Let us defend the Party's Central Committee headed by Dear Comrade Kim Jong Un with our lives!"
- Worker-Peasant Red Guards from 2023: Red with service emblem (red star and gold wreath) in the centre and the Hangul motto in gold above and below the emblem in the obverse, and name of the service in Hangul below the graphic pattern with WPK HQ, two swords and a shield bearing WPK emblem in the reverse, the gold Hangul motto read "For the endless prosperity of the fatherland and the security of the people!"

==== Korea, Republic of (South Korea) ====
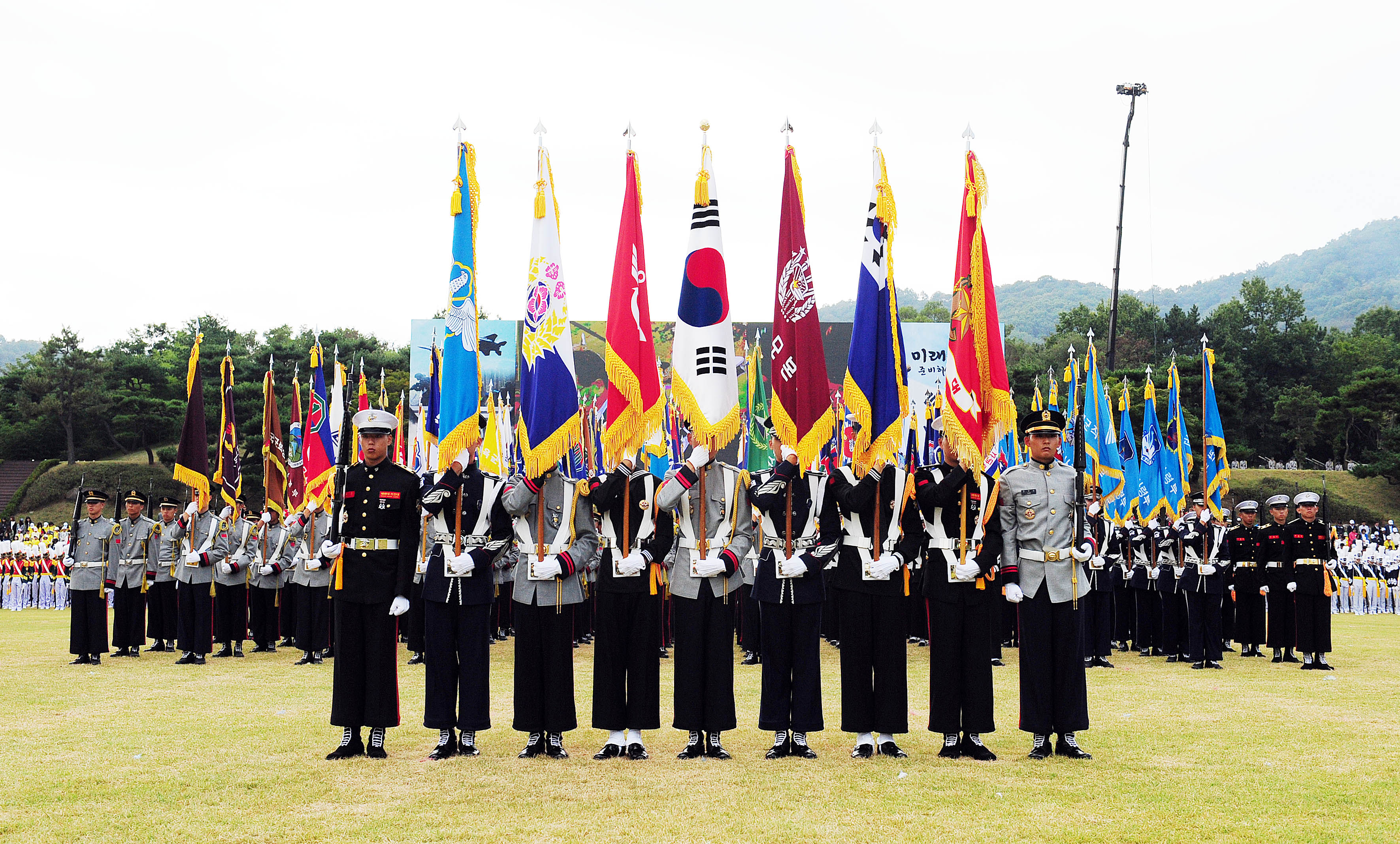
Joint colour guard showing the organizational colours of each branch (L-R): Air Force, Army, Armed Forces, National, Joint Chiefs of Staff, Navy and Marine Corps.

The traditions of military unit and branch colours of the Republic of Korea Armed Forces are mostly derived from the Western practice with the Flag of South Korea treated as a National Colour.

Today each of the ROKAF's service branches have branch regimental colours, all gold fringed, which are carried by colour guards following a mix of Western traditions. The colours are as follows:

- Army: Blue and white with service emblem
- Navy: Blue with white canton (taegeuk with crossed anchors)
  - Marine Corps: Scarlet with service emblem
- Air Force: Air force/sky blue with gold service emblem

In major holiday parades two additional colours are paraded as part of the national colour guard.

- Honorary Colour of the Armed Forces and Ministry of National Defence: Red with armed forces emblem
- Colour of the Joint Chiefs of Staff of the MND and ROKAF: Crimson

Unit and specialty colours follow a mix of the Western models with influences from the Western model, sharing since the 1990s a common design with the unit name in Hangul below the emblem (in the Navy, the unit/command name is on a white scroll below following US precedence).

- Colours of units under the ROK Army
  - Regimental, brigade, division and corps colours: Army Colour with unit DUI/emblem replacing the service arms
  - Infantry: Blue
  - Armour: Yellow
  - Artillery and Missile Command: Burgundy red
  - Air defence artillery: Green
  - Engineers: Light blue
  - Special operations: Black
  - Logistics and service support: White/Orange
  - Reserve units: Dark blue
  - Army aviation: Blue
- Colours of units under the ROK Navy
  - Fleet forces and other commands: Navy blue
  - Marine Corps: Scarlet
  - Service support: White
  - Educational and training institutions: White/Navy blue
- All ROK Air Force formations: Sky blue

In addition, the traditional guard unit under the 3rd Infantry Division of the ROKA carries replica colours similar to those used during the Imperial era, that was used by Sumunjang or royal palace guards with its traditional military band, Daechwita. They are only brought out during state visits to the republic and on major holidays.

==== Laos ====
In Laos, the Colours of the Military and other uniformed institutions follow North Korean and prior French practice. It is basically a large version of the Laotian flag with the unit name below in white in the top and bottom red stripes.

==== Philippines ====
Philippine military colours are the Flag of the Philippines as the National Colour, the Organizational Colours, and the Unit Battle Colour. The Flag of the Philippines is the National Colour of the Armed Forces of the Philippines, but unlike the US colour has no markings on the flag. The Organizational Colours are the flags of the AFP's four Major Service Commands while the Unit Battle Colour differs per service arm and unit. Like the US, it also has 2nd order guidons for companies and troops, but these are also based on the Spanish military guidons and banners, not on the American ones, reflecting the long history of the military establishment here. These guidons are therefore not swallow tailed save for the PMA, the Philippine Army's Escort and Security Btn and some other units under the Philippine Army.

The color facings of the Organizational Colours are:

- Army: Green
- Navy: Ultramarine blue
- Air Force: Air Force Blue
- AFP GHQ: Air force blue, dark blue and green

==== Thailand ====
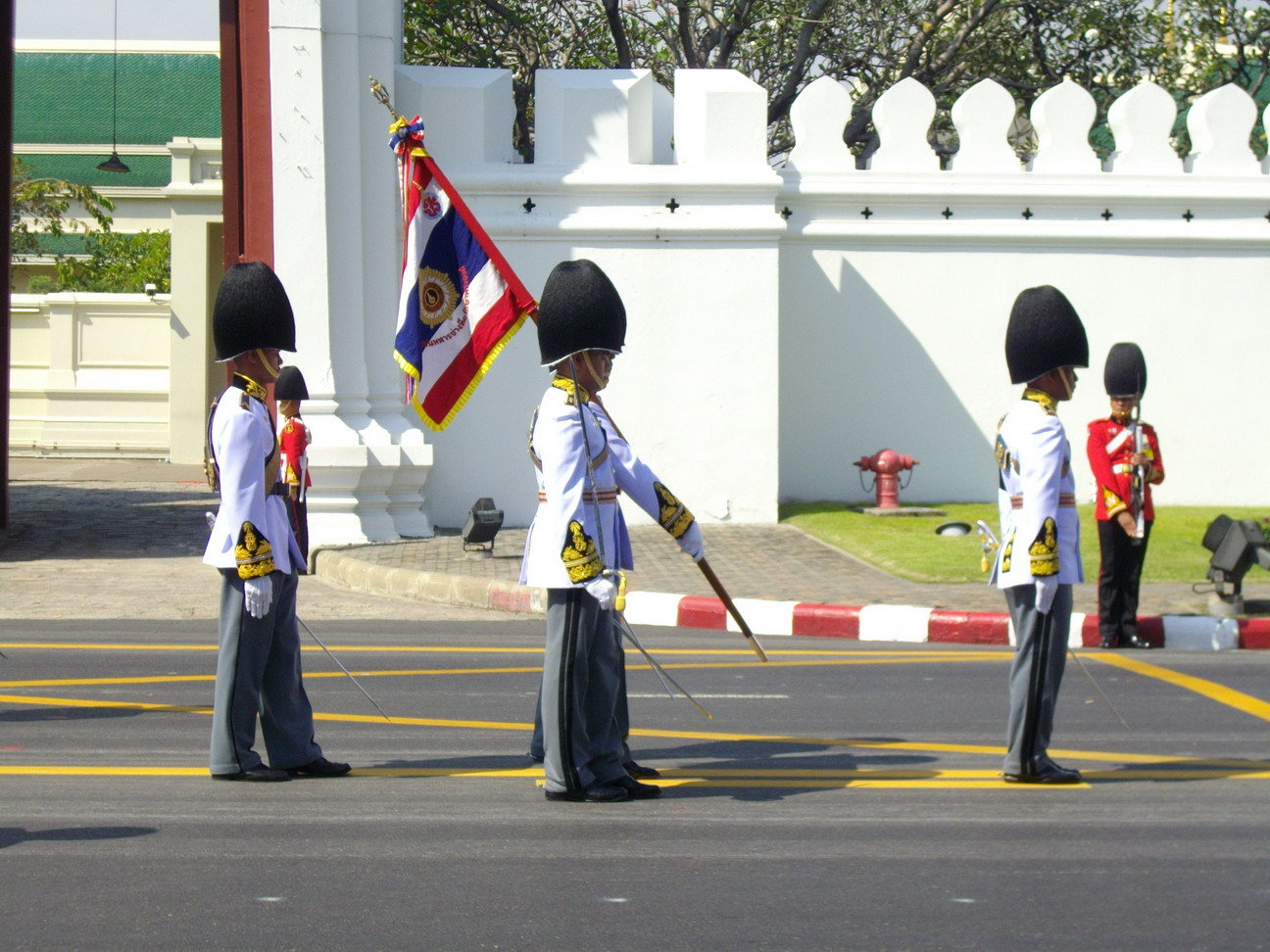
The Unit Colour of the 1st Engineer Bataillion, King's Guard of the Royal Thai Army during the funeral procession of Princess Galyani Vadhana in 2008.

Each unit of the Royal Thai Armed Forces is given a colour called the "Thong Chai Chalermphol" (Thai: ธงชัยเฉลิมพล) or Victory Colours. These are presented to each unit personally by the King of Thailand. The colours are divided into four different designs, for: Royal Thai Army, Royal Thai Navy, Royal Thai Air Force and King's Guard units. Colours of the Navy carry no fringe, the rest have gold fringe. All carry the reigning monarch's cypher on the top right corner near the hoist.

Before their presentation, the colours are ceremonially blessed in a religious ceremony attended by Buddhist monks and other high ranking dignitaries inside the Temple of the Emerald Buddha in Bangkok. During the ceremony amidst the chanting of the monks, the King will personally hammer the brass nails into the staff of each colour using a silver hammer. Each colour contains about 32–35 nails, in which the cloth is attached to the wooden staff. Within the same ceremony, the King will also take a strand of his own hair and conceal it within a compartment at the top of the staff, which is closed by a round silver screw top. The King will also attach each colour with its own ceremonial Buddha image, and bless each colour with holy water. The ceremony is steeped in Buddhist and Brahmic heritage; it symbolizes and cements the King's role as Chief Kshatriya (กษัตริย์) or Warrior ruler of his realm. It also emphasizes his constitutional role as Head and Chief of the Thai Armed Forces (จอมทัพไทย: Chomthap Thai).

These colours are similar to the Flag of Thailand and therefore are treated like the State Colours of the Commonwealth, but are not lowered to the ground but kept above it to the tune of Sansoen Phra Barami (the Royal Anthem) when salutes are rendered by these Colours to the Thai Royal Family (most especially the King and Queen) in all military events that they attend.

Royal Thai Army Unit Colour

Royal Thai Navy Unit Colour

Royal Thai Air Force Unit Colour

Colours of the Royal Guard units

==== Vietnam ====
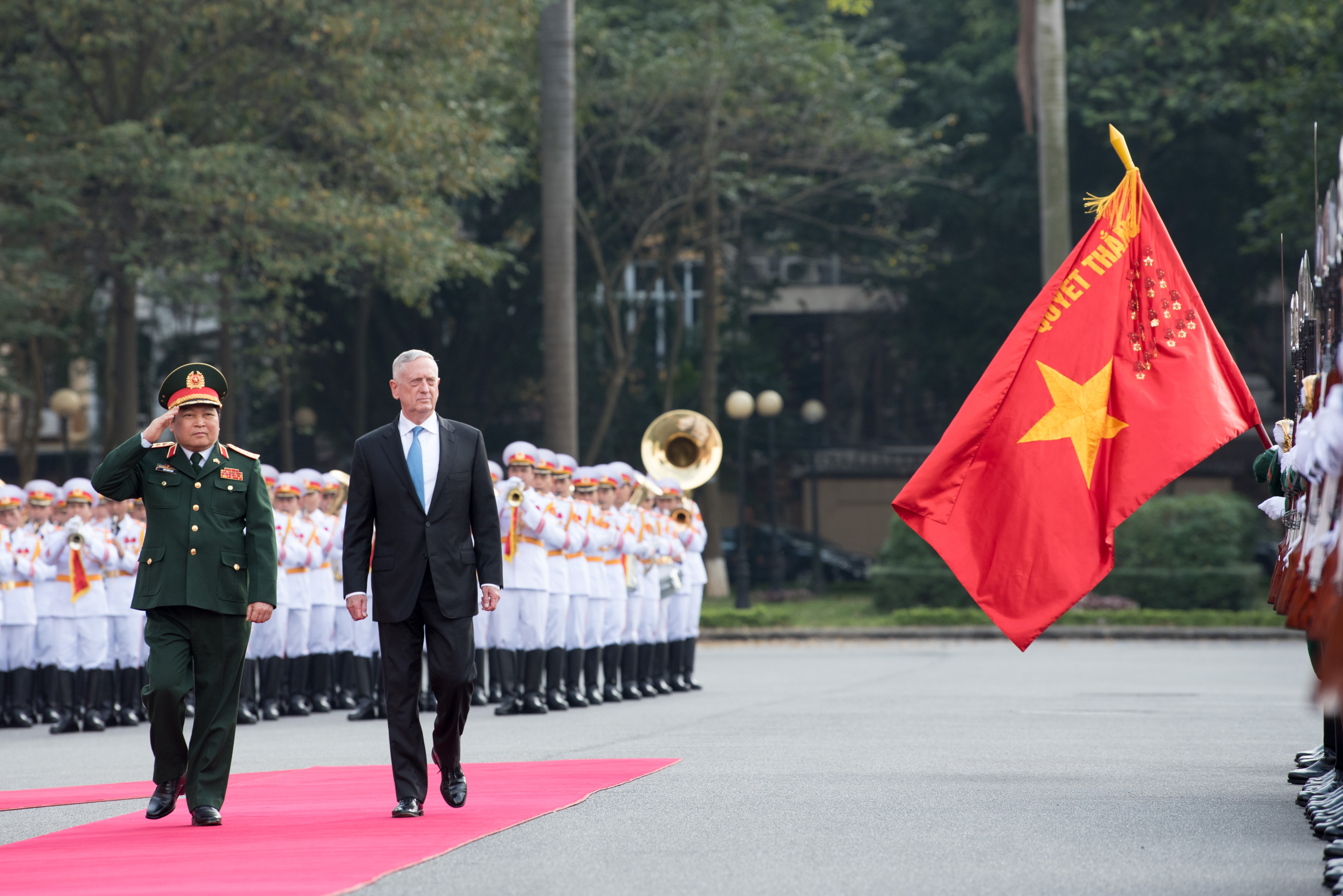
Vietnamese tri-service honor guards welcoming SecDef Jim Mattis in 2018 with a decorated Quyết thắng military flag.

Derived flag of Vietnam is used as a National Colour by practically all Vietnam People’s Army military formations. Defaced with the motto Quyết thắng (lit. 'Determined to win'), in parades and ceremonial occasions, the flag can also be fringed in gold with any decorations and/or medals to attached in the canton area by the motto. The formal name or designation of military units and components can also be inscribed below the golden star in ceremonial occasions. In general, Vietnam does not use distinctive colours or flag templates for different service branches and units. Maritime forces such as the Navy, Border Guard or Militia actually have their own coloured ensigns or jacks alongside their standard Quyết thắng scarlet colours, however they are largely to indicate the governmental authority and in-duty status, and not for use in parades or ceremonial purposes.

The national flag of Vietnam

The military flag of Vietnam, being the national flag defaced with the military motto "QUYẾT THẮNG"

Flag of the Vietnam Air Defence - Air Force, being the military flag further defaced with the service's Vietnamese name "QUÂN CHỦNG PHÒNG KHÔNG – KHÔNG QUÂN" below the star

Flag of the Vietnamese military administration on the disputed Spratly Island, being the military flag alternatively defaced with the island's Vietnamese name "ĐẢO TRƯỜNG SA" below the star

Meanwhile, the Vietnam People's Public Security also follows a very similar convention, however using a different motto: Bảo vệ an ninh Tổ quốc (lit. 'Protecting the security of the Fatherland').

=== Commonwealth of Nations ===
A moth-eaten rag on a worm-eaten pole,
It does not look likely to stir a man's Soul,
'Tis the deeds that were done 'neath the moth-eaten rag,
When the pole was a staff, and the rag was a flag.

— Sir Edward Hamly on seeing some old Colours of the 32nd Foot in Monmouth Church.

So long as its colors remain, and there is one man left to carry them, a regiment can never die; they can recruit it again around that one man, and the regiment will continue on its road to future glory with the same old traditions behind it and the same atmosphere surrounding it that made brave men of its forbears. So although the colors are not exactly the soul of a regiment, they are the concrete embodiment of it, and are even more sacred than the person of a reigning sovereign.

— Talbot Mundy, The Soul of a Regiment

The colours of the infantry and standards of the cavalry are a set of large flags, unique to each regiment, that the ordinary soldier would be able to identify straight away.

==== Australia, Canada, and New Zealand ====
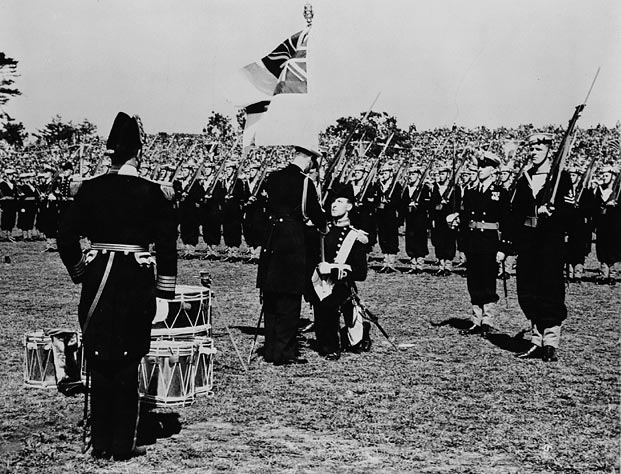
George VI presents the King's Colours to the Royal Canadian Navy at a ceremony in Beacon Hill Park, Victoria, in 1939

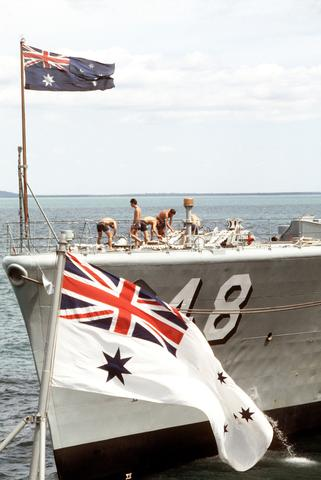
The Australian National Flag (top) was the basis of the Australian White Ensign (bottom).

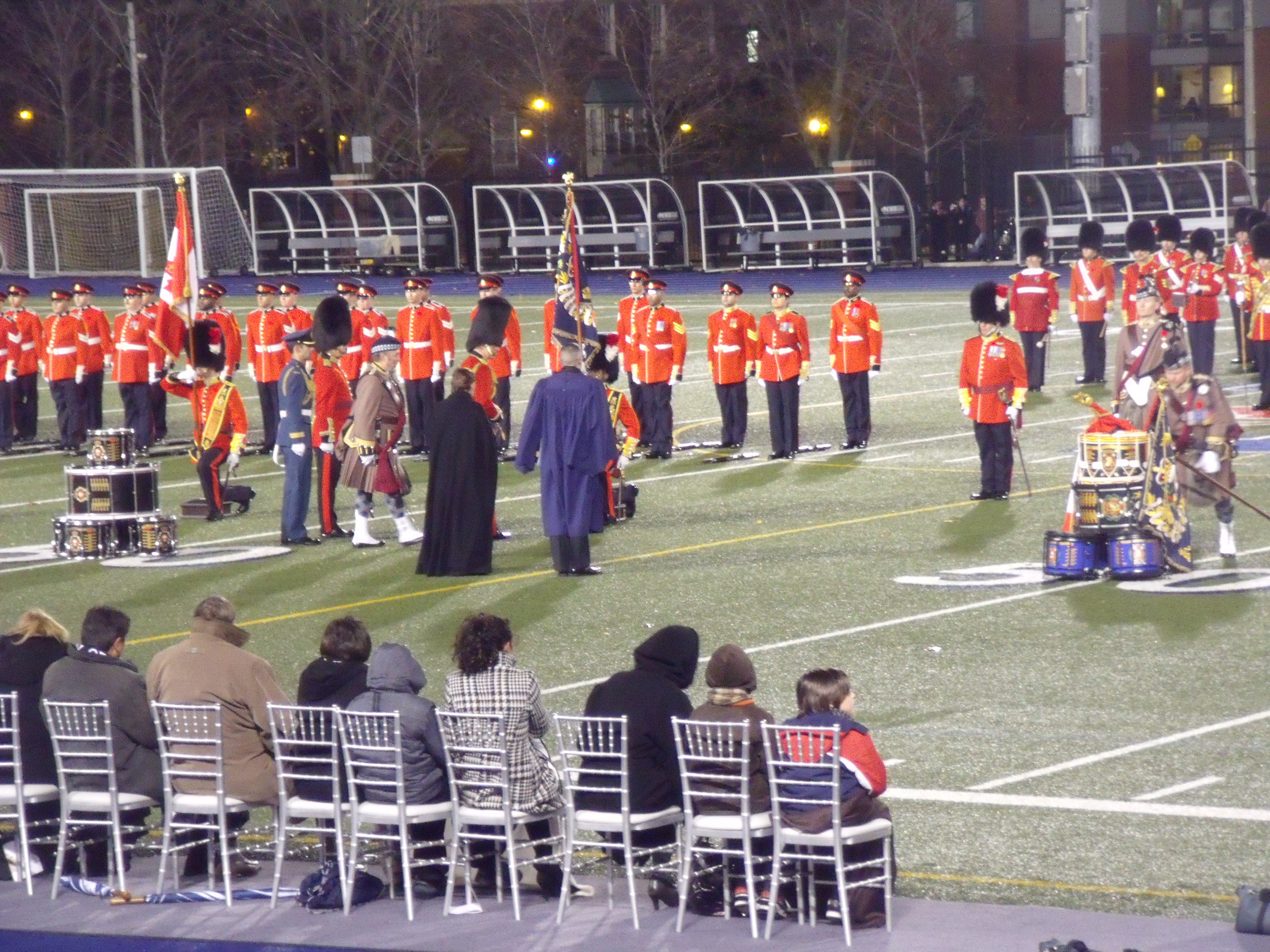
Prince Charles, Prince of Wales, presents new colours to the Royal Regiment of Canada and Toronto Scottish Regiment at Varsity Stadium in Toronto, 5 November 2009

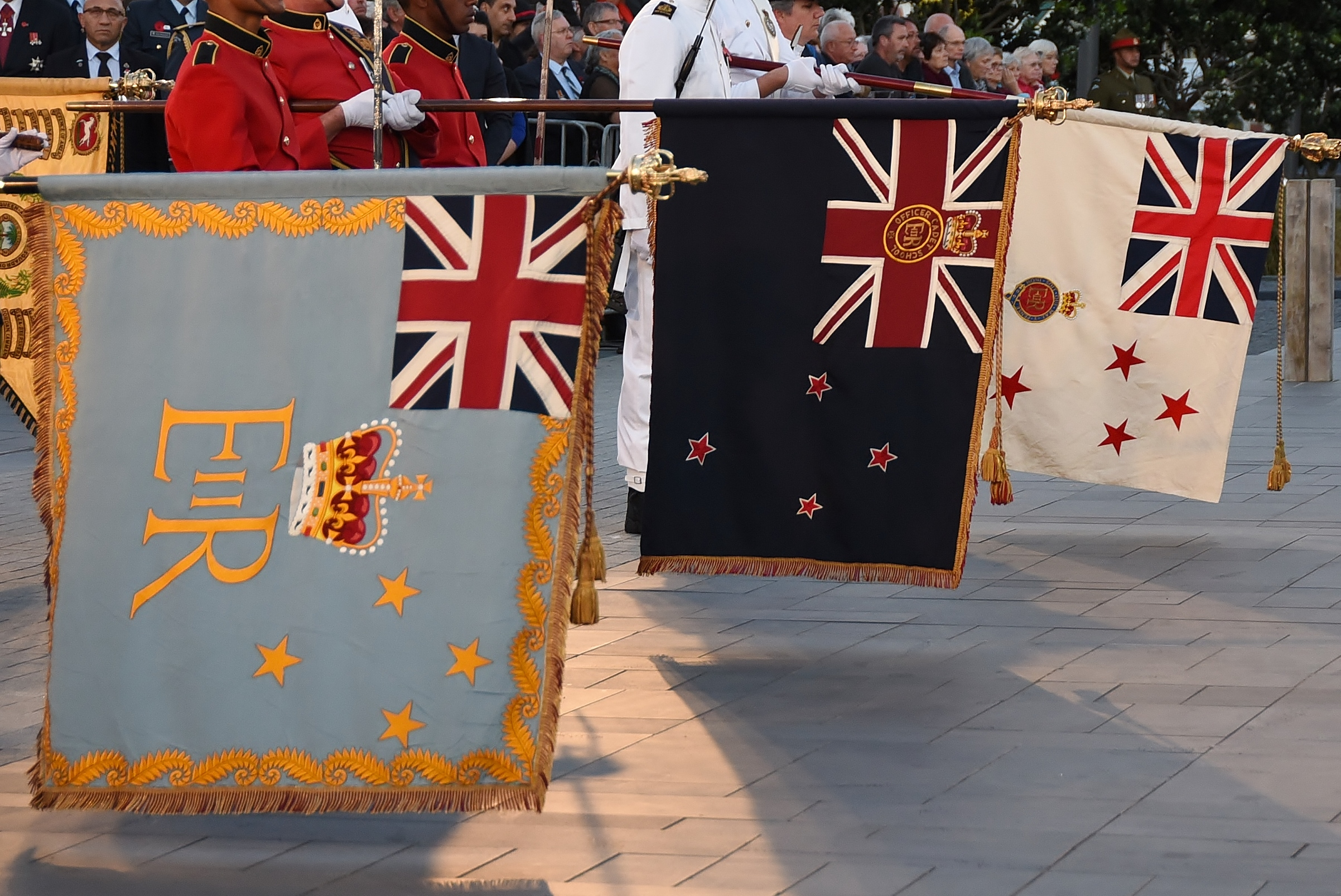
Queen's colours of the Royal New Zealand Air Force, New Zealand Army Officer Cadet School and Royal New Zealand Navy

The naval and air forces of all three of these countries also have similar colours based on their own ensigns. Rules stipulated by the Canadian Department of Defence state that the First, or Senior Colours symbolizes the unit's loyalty to the Crown; authorization to possess a king's colour may only be granted, and the colour presented, by the monarch or his or her vice-regal representative. The design based on the flag of Canada reflects the custom established for infantry line regiments in the mid-18th century, when the sovereign's colour was based on the national flag, as was the practice in British and French units in Canada.

===== Air Force =====
- Royal Australian Air Force: The king's colour of the RAAF is the Royal Australian Air Force Ensign. It is similar to that of the RAF – however, in addition to the RAAF roundel, which is in the lower fly, it has the Commonwealth Star in the lower hoist and the stars of the Southern Cross in the upper fly, with the royal cypher in the centre. The flag has a border of golden wattle as well as golden fringe. Squadron and command colours are in air force blue with the honours and the heraldic emblem of the formation.
- Royal Canadian Air Force: The king's colour of the RCAF is different from that of other Commonwealth air forces in that it is not based on the ensign but instead is similar to the King's colours of infantry regiments: it is a silk national flag of Canada with a red circlet on the maple leaf inscribed with the name of the command, surrounding the royal cypher, and ensigned with the royal crown. Uniquely among Commonwealth air forces, the RCAF also has a command colour, analogous to an infantry regimental colour. This is light blue with the RCAF badge in the centre and a maple leaf in each corner, stems inward. Squadrons with 25 years or more of active service receive squadron standards with battle honours surrounding the unit badge on the same light blue background edged with flowers (the ten provincial floral emblems).

===== Army =====
All colours of the Army were on parade for the centenary of the Army, 10 March 2001.

- Australian infantry battalions formed just prior to or during World War I had a pair (a stand) of colours, being a King's Colour based on the Union Flag and a separate Regimental Colour emblazoned with the battalion number and its colour patch (shoulder badge). Battle honours were also emblazoned on the Regimental Colour. These customs followed the British tradition. Some of those World War I battalions were amalgamated prior to or during World War II. For example, the 57th Battalion amalgamated with the 60th Battalion in 1930, forming the 57th/60th Battalion which saw action in the South West Pacific campaigns during World War II. The 57th/60th Battalion did not have its own colours, but by dint of history inherited both stands of colours from the 57th and the 60th. In accordance with the order of battle the 57th/60th wore the colour patch of the 57th on its uniforms, but they still paraded and presented the colours of both the 57th and the 60th. Queen Elizabeth II gave permission in 1960 for the battle honours from World War II (South-West Pacific 1943–45, Liberation of Australian New Guinea, Commando Road, etc.) to be emblazoned on the Queen's colours, rather than on the Regimental Colours, which were already emblazoned with honours from World War I (The Somme, Passchendaele, Villers-Bretonneux, Amiens, etc.). A similar situation occurred with the amalgamation in 1942 of the 58th Battalion and the 59th Battalion to form the 58th/59th Battalion, which wore the colour patch of the 58th Battalion on its uniforms but inherited and paraded both stands of colours from the 58th Battalion and 59th Battalion. The 57th/60th Battalion and the 58th/59th Battalion were disbanded soon after World War II and the colours were laid up in the Shrine of Remembrance in Melbourne where they are on display in the Crypt. The Shrine and other war memorials and churches around Australia display many other stands of battalion colours that have been laid up in their care, such as St Stephens Church, Sydney.
- While the colours of the Australian Army infantry regiments follow the British tradition, starting in the 1960s colours based on the Australian national flag are now used as the king's colour. Armoured units carry Standards and Guidons – flags smaller than Colours and traditionally carried by cavalry, lancer, light horse and mounted infantry units. The 1st Armoured Regiment is the only unit in the Australian Army to carry a Standard, in the tradition of heavy armoured units. Guidons are also carried by aviation units. Only the Royal Australian Artillery's regiments uses guns rather than flags as the colours, sans A Field Battery, which carries the King's Banner in recognition of service as the first all-Australian artillery battery. The regiment as a whole carries its own King's Banner. Non-combat units (combat service support corps) do not have Colours, but have Standards or Banners instead. The Royal Military College, Duntroon also has an additional colour, the Sovereign's Banner, carried yearly by the RMC's Champion Company from the Corps of Staff Cadets formed from the best cadet company for the year, which on parades takes precedence over the other companies as the Sovereign's Company. The Army itself since 2001 has a banner known as the Army Banner, carried on all events of the service (as the Army is the protector of the traditions of the Flag of Australia, and thus does not have its own service colour). It is trimmed with gold fringe, has gold and crimson cords and tassels, and is mounted on a pike with the usual British royal crest finial. The Army Banner bears the Australian Coat of Arms on the obverse, with the dates "1901–2001" in gold in the upper hoist. The reverse bears the "rising sun" badge of the Australian Army, flanked by seven campaign honours on small gold-edged scrolls: South Africa, World War I, World War II, Korea, Malaya-Borneo, South Vietnam, Peacekeeping and East Timor. It was presented to the Army in celebration of its 2001 centennial year.
- In the Canadian Armed Forces, Royal Canadian Armoured Corps (RCAC) regiments designated horse guards and dragoon guards, along with the Canadian Special Operations Regiment (CSOR), have regimental standards. RCAC standards have a crimson field and the CSOR standard has a tan field. RCAC regiments other than horse guards and dragoon guards have crimson regimental guidons. Each battalion of the Royal Canadian Infantry Corps, except those of rifle regiments, has a stand of two colours: a king's colour and a regimental colour. For foot guards, king's colours have a crimson field, and regimental colours are based on the Canadian national flag. For other infantry regiments, king's colours are based on the national flag, and regimental colours are of the regimental facing colour. Only the Royal Regiment of Canadian Artillery uses guns for its colours. The rifle regiments share the traditions of the former British rifle regiments of having their battle honours carried on their drums. The Royal Canadian Engineers do not have colours but have the motto ubique, Latin for 'everywhere', on their cap badges and other insignia to represent their service everywhere.
- Only the Royal New Zealand Infantry Regiment, the sole infantry regiment of the New Zealand Army, has a stand of colours, with the king's colour now based on the Flag of New Zealand, with the Union Flag canton carrying the regimental insignia, and the regimental colour being royal blue due to its status as a royal regiment. Stands of Colours are present in the regiment's two regular and three reserve battalions. Until 1964, when the New Zealand infantry was reorganized into a single regiment, all the reserve infantry regiments also carried their own colours. The sole armoured regiment, Queen Alexandra's Mounted Rifles, carried until its disbandment a guidon in the traditions of cavalry units raised in New Zealand since the 19th century.

===== Navy =====
- Royal Australian Navy: The King's Colour of the RAN is the Australian White Ensign – it is a reverse of the Australian national flag (white with blue stars) – with Elizabeth II's royal cypher and Garter band positioned between the Commonwealth Star and the stars representing the Southern Cross. (See former colours at Naval Chapel, Garden Island NSW.) The RAN possesses two colours: the first is the Fleet Colour held on behalf of the fleet units by Fleet Headquarters, HMAS Kuttabul. The second, known as the Establishment Colour, is held by HMAS Cerberus on behalf of the shore establishments.
- Royal Canadian Navy: The King's Colour is a variation of the Canadian Naval Ensign – it is white, with the Canadian national flag in the canton, the cypher from Elizabeth II's personal flag (a crowned "E" surrounded by a wreath of roses) in the centre, and the symbol of the navy in the lower fly. The colour is fringed in gold. Until 1979 the RCN possessed two identical colours: one for the Atlantic fleet and one for the Pacific fleet. Since then, a single colour has been held at Naval Staff Headquarters.
- Royal New Zealand Navy: Since 1968 the RNZN King's Colour is a variant of the Naval Ensign of New Zealand – itself the Flag of New Zealand but in white, with Elizabeth II's royal cypher and Garter band situated near the Southern Cross.
King's Colour of the Royal Australian Navy

King's Colour of the Royal Canadian Navy

King's Colour of the Royal New Zealand Navy

==== India ====
Given its Commonwealth heritage as a former British colony, the Indian Armed Forces sports colours which are equivalent to those used in the British military.

===== Presidential Colours to service branches of the armed forces =====
President's Colour of the Indian Navy

President's Colour of Indian Air Force

Only the Navy and Air Force sport President's Service Colours which are their respective naval ensign and air force flag which are gold fringed with modifications:

- The Navy's PSC, used since 2022, carries the Lion Capital of Ashoka, the basis of the state emblem, atop the naval heraldric arms, with the National Motto Satyameva Jayate (Truth Alone Triumphs) below
- The Air Force PSC has an elephant above the Air Force Roundel

===== President's Colours/Standards/Guidons/Banners of military units =====
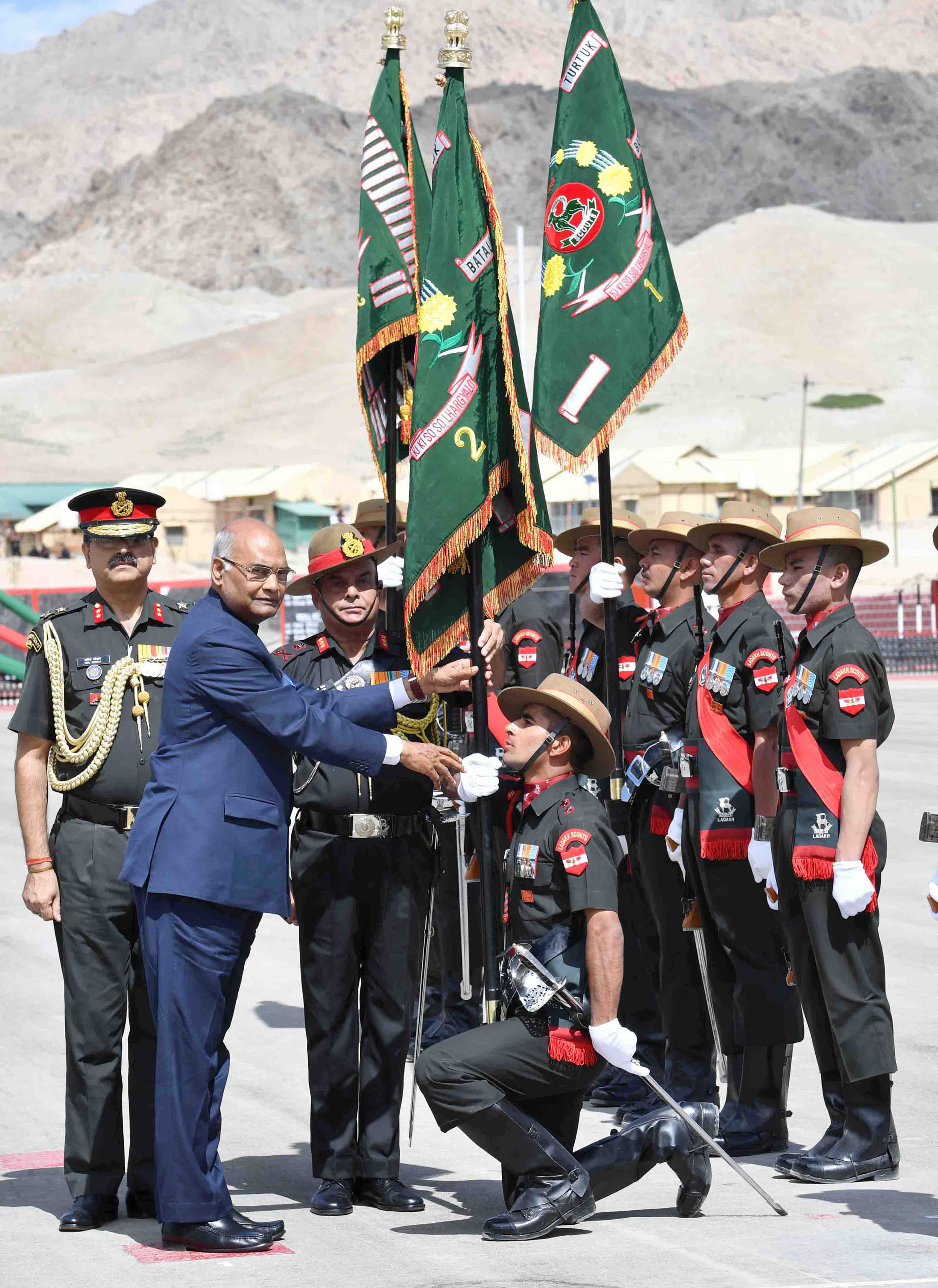
The President, Shri Ramnath Kovind presenting the prestigious President's Regimental Colours to all five Ladakh Scouts Battalions and Ladakh Scouts Regimental Centre, at Leh on August 21, 2017.

President's Colours (Standard and Guidon for mounted units of the Army and Air Force flying units and Banners for service arms and the light infantry) are awarded to distinguished units of the Armed Forces by the President of India, who is the Supreme Commander of the Armed Forces, these are the equivalents to British regimental colours. In the Army, these colours carry the regimental/battalion insignia and any recognized battle honours won by the unit.

- Army
  - Cavalry Standards – per colour facing
  - Cavalry Guidons – same as standards
  - Artillery and Air Defence Artillery Banners - burgundy red and blue
  - Infantry Colours – per respective colour facing
  - Light Infantry and Rifle Colours – same as regular infantry
  - Service Corps Banners/Colours – per respective colours
- Air Force – sky blue

Only the President's Bodyguard has had in times a full strand following British practice, consisting of the President's Standard and a Regimental Standard.

==== Malaysia ====
The same format of Sovereign's and Regimental Colours also apply in Malaysia. The King's Colours and Regimental Colours of the Malaysian Armed Forces are the flags given by the King of Malaysia in his responsibilities as Supreme Commander-in-Chief of the Armed Forces and by the 8 other state monarchs. The colours are given to units recognized as Royal units and to flags of large formations (the King's Colour) and to units receiving their new regimental colours (the Unit Regimental Colour).

The King's Colour is yellow with the national arms surrounded by paddy on the centre. Thus Malaysia is one of only two Commonwealth countries, the other being Brunei, that does not use its national flag as a senior Colour (the flag is the senior colour of the entire Armed Forces establishment). The sides are emblazoned with the battle honours of the unit. On the canton the service emblem of either service of the Armed Forces (Army, Navy and Air Force) can be seen. The Regimental Colour, however, differs by service arm or branch (the latter case being used in the Army) and unit. Both flags have gold fringes surrounding them. These colours are only present in formal parades.

During the Independence Day Parade and on Armed Forces Day on 21 September, as the armed services on parade do not wear their dress uniforms, only the 1st Battalion, Royal Malay Regiment, which wears dress uniforms, is present with its King's and Regimental Colours. For the rest of the services on public parade, the following order then applies:

- Service Colour/Regimental Camp Flag
- Flag of Malaysia (National Colour)
- Colour of the Malaysian Armed Forces

In addition the Royal Johor Military Force was granted its privilege in the 1910s, as the sole state defense force in the country, to have its own Regimental Colour.

Victoria Institution is the only private educational institution granted Colours for its role in the Second World War.

==== Singapore ====
Singaporean military colours of the Singapore Armed Forces are divided today into Service State Colours and Unit Regimental Colours. Until 1997 there were also Service Regimental Colours and Unit State Colours. The Service State Colours are similar to the Flag of Singapore but differ per service, with the service emblem in the white field. But Regimental Colours are different, and they differ per unit or service arm (save for the flags of the Air Force and Navy that show their respective service colours instead and some SAF service-wide commands like the Military Police). Their common design is that of the regimental or command arms at the centre of the colour, which is in the colour of the unit uniform facings or service branch which it belongs. Both are gold fringed and are brought out on major occasions only. The former Unit State Colours carried the unit emblem or badge in the white field of the national flag.

==== Sri Lanka ====
President's Colour of Sri Lanka

When Sri Lanka declared itself a republic in 1972 the units that had a King's colour, first using the Union Jack and then the current national flag, retired them. These were replaced by the new President's Colour, which was first awarded in 1972. The following colours have been awarded:

- Sri Lanka Army
  - Regiments
    - Sri Lanka Light Infantry – 1978
    - Gemunu Watch – 1980
    - Gajaba Regiment – 2007
    - Sri Lanka Armoured Corps
    - Sri Lanka Artillery
  - Establishments
    - Army Training Centre – 1972, laid up 20 August 1992
    - Sri Lanka Military Academy – 1997
- Sri Lanka Air Force
  - Sri Lanka Air Force – 1976
  - SLAF Regiment – 2009
  - Squadrons
    - No. 1 Flying Training Wing – 2001
    - No. 2 Heavy Transport Squadron – 2009
    - No. 4 (VIP) Helicopter Squadron – 2009
    - No. 9 Attack Helicopter Squadron – 2009
    - No. 10 Fighter Squadron – 2009
  - Stations
    - SLAF Katunayake – 2001
- Sri Lanka Navy
  - Commanders
    - Admiral of the fleet Wasantha Karannagoda
  - Establishments
    - Naval and Maritime Academy – 2000

Regimental colours follow the British model, and the two light infantry regiments (Sri Lanka Sinha Regiment and Sri Lanka Rifle Corps) do not carry colours at all. Unlike the British Royal Artillery, the Sri Lanka Artillery carries a set of President's and Regimental Colours, the same case for the Sri Lanka Engineers.

Unlike the Air Force which uses a single colour design similar to the RAF, the Navy sports unit and command colours in the same fashion as the Army.

The design of the President's Colours of Navy and Air Force units are the gold fringed versions of their service flags. The Army President's Colour is a gold fringed national flag with the national arms in between the teal and orange stripes on the left.

==== United Kingdom ====
===== Line infantry and foot guards =====
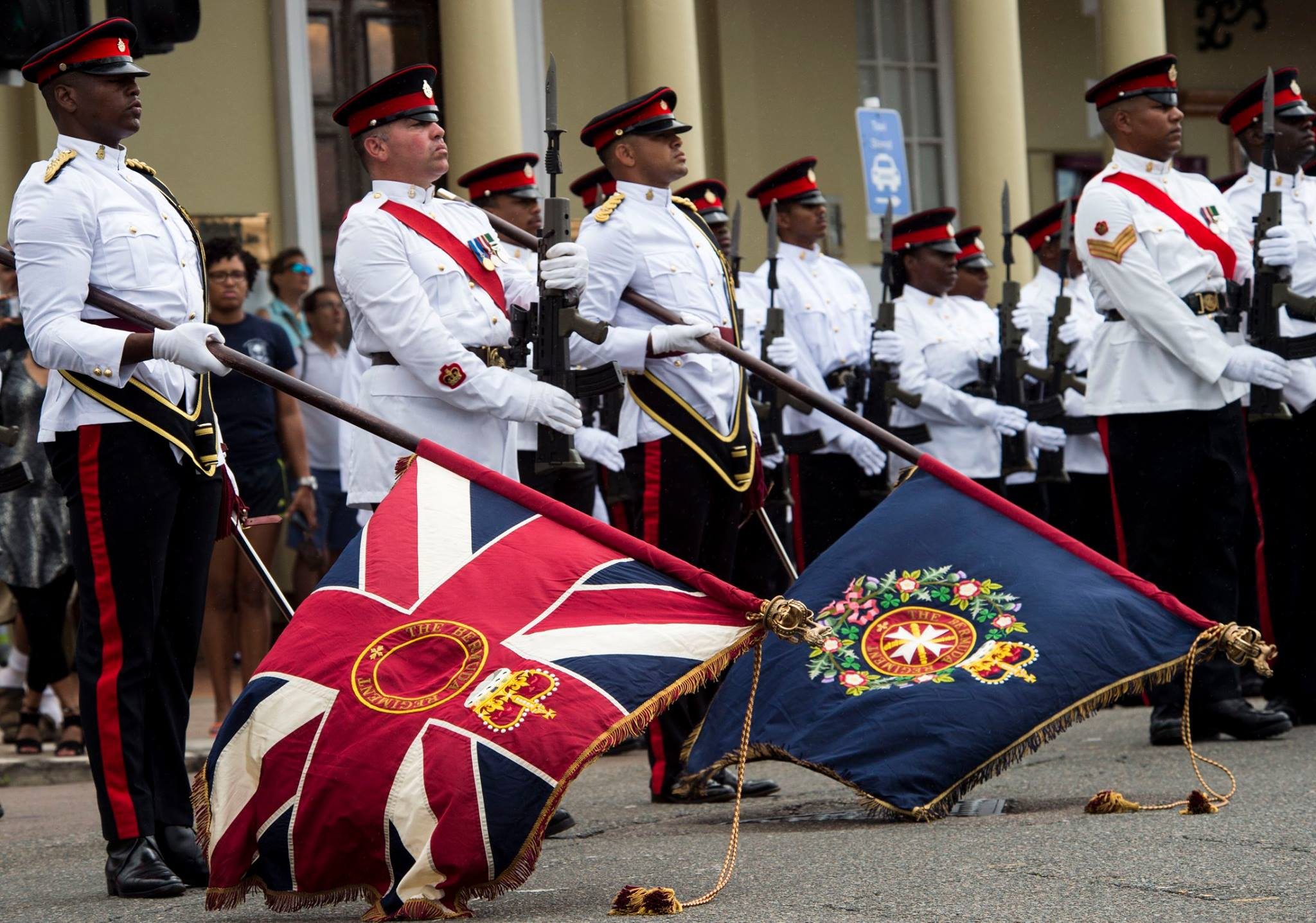
Colour party of the Royal Bermuda Regiment at Queen's Birthday Parade on 10 June 2017

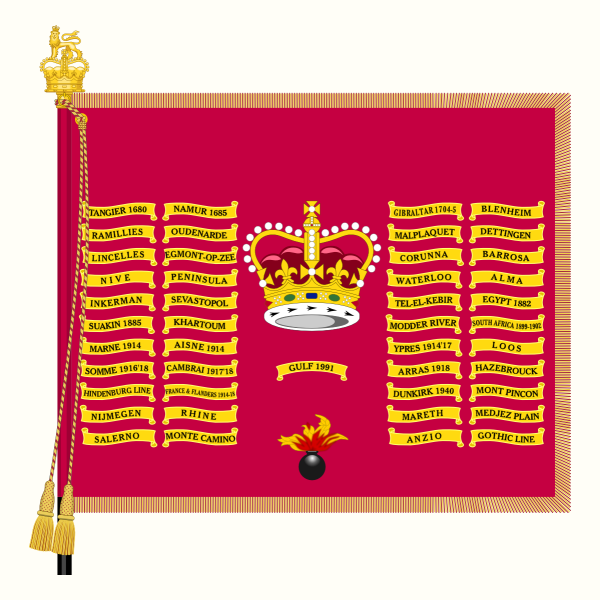
King's colour of the 1st Battalion, the Grenadier Guards. In contrast with those of the line infantry regiments, the king's colours of Foot Guards regiments are crimson, and it is their regimental colours that are based on the Union Flag. Foot Guards regiments also emblazon the same honours (from all conflicts, including both World Wars) on both colours.

In regiments of infantry of the British Army and the armies of other Commonwealth countries, each battalion carries two colours, which collectively are called a stand. These are large flags, usually 36 by 45 inches (91 cm × 114 cm), and mounted on a half pike which is 8 feet 7 1/2 inches (2.629 m) long; the king's or queen's colour (state or president's colour if the country is a republic) is usually a version of the country's national flag, often trimmed with gold fabric, and with the regiment's insignia placed in the centre. The regimental colour is a flag of a single colour, usually the colour of the uniform facings (collar/lapels and cuffs) of the regiment, again often trimmed and with the insignia in the centre. Most regiments that are designated as 'royal' regiments (that is either have the word 'Royal' or the sponsorship of a royal personage in their name) have a royal blue regimental colour, most royal regiments have a Union Flag canton in that background. Irish regiments, today the Royal Irish Regiment, have a dark green regimental colour.

The colours of the five regiments of Foot Guards have the pattern of the line infantry reversed, with the king's colour of each of the 1st Battalions being crimson with the regimental insignia, a royal crown and honours and the regimental colour a variation of the Union Flag with the battle honours embroidered. The king's colours of any additional battalions from these regiments (currently held by the five incremental companies from four out of the six regiments) feature a Union Flag canton at the top corner.

===== Additional colours =====
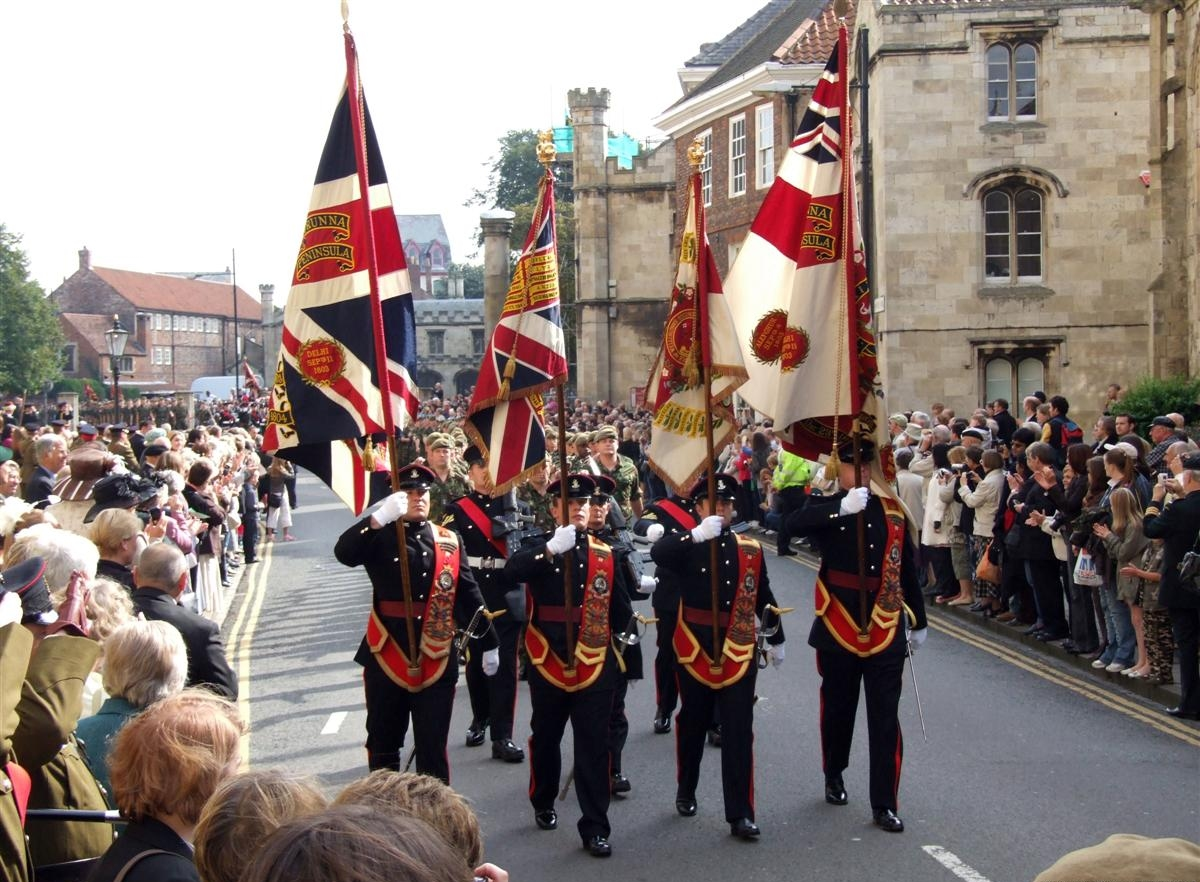
Additional colours of the 3rd Battalion Yorkshire Regiment (Duke of Wellington's).

- The Grenadier, Coldstream and Scots Guards each have at least one state colour; this is usually crimson with various regimental devices and honours, and the royal cypher at the corners of it. They are only used by guards of honour from any unit from these regiments, not found by the King's Guard, mounted on state occasions when the King is present. They are only lowered to the King and Queen and on state occasions only when the king is present, even if the guard of honour is mounted in honour of some other personage. The colour design is larger than the normal colours of the Guards Division used in ceremonies.
- The 1st Battalion, Princess of Wales's Royal Regiment, as the lineal descendant, bears the Third Colour initially borne by the 2nd Regiment of Foot, later renamed the Queen's Royal Regiment (West Surrey) which, for one reason or another, was never taken away from the regiment in the 18th century when new regulations on colours were implemented.
- The 1st Battalion, Royal Regiment of Fusiliers bears the Drummer's Colour awarded after the Battle of Wilhelmsthal to the 5th Regiment of Foot, (later The Royal Northumberland Fusiliers) of which it is the direct descendant.
- The 3rd Battalion, Yorkshire Regiment (Duke of Wellington's), as the linear descendant, carries the honorary King's and Regimental Colours that were given to the 76th Regiment of Foot by the Honourable East India Company following their actions at Delhi and Allyghur.
- The Royal Highland Fusiliers 2nd Battalion, Royal Regiment of Scotland carries the Assaye Colour awarded as an honorary colour to the 74th Regiment of Foot following the Battle of Assaye, which is paraded every year on Assaye Day.
- The Honourable Artillery Company has both a stand of colours (king's and regimental) and guns. The latter are also regarded as colours and accorded the same compliments just as the Royal Artillery regard their guns as their colours.

===== Rifle regiments =====
By tradition, rifle regiments do not carry colours; this goes back to their formation, when they were used as skirmishers and sharpshooters. While individual units may have had banners or pennants to distinguish themselves from other units, regiments as a whole never needed a full stand of colours. Today, the two rifle regiments in the British Army, The Rifles and the Royal Gurkha Rifles carry their battle honours on their drums, while the Royal Green Jackets also had theirs inscribed on their cap badge; this tradition is maintained by The Rifles, who wear the Maltese cross badge of the Royal Green Jackets, inscribed with the regimental honours, as the belt badge. In place of a regimental colour, the Gurkhas carry the Queen's Truncheon awarded in 1863.

The Sri Lanka Sinha Regiment was the first modern non-British regiment to receive truncheons when they were awarded to that unit in 2017. In 2019, a similar truncheon, the Rana Parashuwa, was granted to the Sri Lanka Army Special Forces Regiment, the first of their kind granted to a Commonwealth special forces formation. Formerly, the Malaysian Army Royal Ranger Regiment was granted a regimental truncheon in 1966.

In India, colours or banners are given instead of truncheons, following Russian practice and in line with the ancient Indian traditions of old, to all the rifle and scout infantry regiments by the president of India.

===== Colours in the cavalry regiments =====
In the British Army's cavalry units, the king's cavalry standard and the regimental standard (for the heavy cavalry) and the king's cavalry guidons and regimental guidons (for the light cavalry) are the equivalents to the line infantry colours. The king's standard is crimson with the royal coat of arms and cypher, plus the regimental honours, while the regimental (squadron/union) standard has an adaptable background colour per unit (the colour is sometimes scarlet) and includes sometimes the Union Badge below the crown and the royal cypher at the sides of the badge, with the unit honours below. The light cavalry guidon is swallow-tailed and includes the regimental coat of arms and honours. Before the 1950s, however, Timpani in the drumhorses (and later snare, bass and tenor drums in the dismounted bands) carried the regimental honours and insignia of the light cavalry regiments. For dragoon guards regiments, the sequence is mixed, since these regiments have a king's cavalry standard and regimental guidons.

The Household Cavalry has the following unique colours:

- The Life Guards: King's cavalry standard only
- The Blues and Royals: King's cavalry standard, regimental guidon

===== Embellishments =====
Woven onto the colours are battle honours; the king's colour has honours from the First World War and Second World War, while the regimental colour has honours from other campaigns. The regimental colour can also have other distinctions, including antecedent emblems and unique honours; one significant example is the Sphinx emblem carried by regiments who took part in the Egypt campaign of 1801. The Foot Guards carry battle honours from all engagements in both of their colours. If the regiment has more than a single battalion, then there are identifying marks on the colours to show which battalion they belong to.

There are various other embellishments that can be added to the colours on various occasions:

- On anniversaries of various battle honours, and certain other events, a laurel wreath is added to the top of the pike.
- Battle honour equivalents awarded by foreign countries may be added to the colours, subject to permission being given by the head of state. In the Commonwealth, three infantry battalions are permitted to display the 4-foot-long (1.2 m) blue streamer that signifies the Presidential Unit Citation/Distinguished Unit Citation (PUC), which is the highest collective award given by the United States:
  - 2nd Battalion, Princess Patricia's Canadian Light Infantry
  - 3rd Battalion, Royal Australian Regiment
  - 6th Battalion, Royal Australian Regiment

In the United Kingdom, 41 Commando, Royal Marines, and the 1st Battalion, Gloucestershire Regiment, were also awarded the PUC and permitted to display the streamer of their regimental colours.

Because of their importance to the regiment, prior to a new stand of colours being presented, they are consecrated.

===== Royal Air Force =====
King's Colour of the Royal Air Force

RAF colours are made of sky blue silk and measure approximately 36 by 36 inches (91 cm × 91 cm). The following colours have been awarded:

- RAF College, Cranwell, approved 27 December 1947, presented 6 July 1948.
- The RAF in the UK, approved 27 December 1947, presented, 16 May 1951.
- No. 1 School of Technical Training RAF, approved 27 December 1947, presented 25 July 1952.
- RAF Regiment, presented 17 March 1953.
- Near East Air Force, presented 14 October 1960, laid up 31 May 1976.
- Far East Air Force, presented 13 July 1961, laid up 30 January 1972.
- Central Flying School, presented 26 June 1969.
- RAF Germany, presented 16 September 1970, laid up 27 June 1993.
- Royal Auxiliary Air Force, presented 12 June 1989.
- RAF Halton, presented 31 October 1997.
- Royal Air Force Regiment, presented July 2017.

The King's colour for the Royal Air Force in the United Kingdom is a variation of the RAF Ensign with its dimensions altered. The RAF Roundel is moved to the lower fly, with its place in the centre again taken by the royal cypher surmounted by the crown. Other colours feature the unit's badge in the centre with the royal cypher and crown in the first quarter.

The RAF's squadron standards are its counterpart to the regimental colours. They are in air force blue with the squadron insignia and honours.

All RAF colours are surrounded by sky blue fringe.

===== Royal Hospital, Chelsea =====
The Royal Hospital, Chelsea had neither colours nor other distinctive device during its entire history, until 2002 when Queen Elizabeth II presented the hospital with the Sovereign's Mace. This is now paraded by a party of in-pensioners at all of the Royal Hospital's ceremonial events.

===== Royal Marines =====
The Corps of Royal Marines has a single pattern king's colour, which is the Union Flag with the foul anchor and the reigning sovereign's cypher interlaced in the centre. Above is a scroll with the single battle honour Gibraltar surmounted by St Edward's Crown. Below is the globe (which represents the many battle honours the Royal Marines had earned) surrounded by a laurel wreath (which represents the Battle of Belle Isle) and below this is a scroll with the corps' motto. Each of the four commandos (the battalion-sized formations that make up the bulk of the corps) has a King's colour, with the only difference being the colour of the cords and tassels. Each commando also has its own regimental colour. The regimental colour is a dark blue flag (because the corps is classed as a 'royal regiment') with a small Union Flag at the pike head. The colour carries similar central embellishments as the king's colour, with the exception that the cypher of George IV replaces that of the reigning monarch and the unit numeral is below. The royal cypher is at the other corners. The regimental colours also have the coloured cords and tassels, which are gold combined with the following colours:

- 40 Commando: Light blue
- 42 Commando: White
- 43 Commando: Old gold and scarlet
- 45 Commando: Red

The former 41 Commando was awarded the Distinguished Unit Citation for its service in the Korean War, and was thus permitted to carry the streamer on its Regimental Colour.

===== Royal Navy =====
The colours of His Majesty's ships in the Royal Navy consist of:

- a White Ensign (worn at the stern, or from the gaff or main yardarm when at sea);
- a Union Jack (worn at the ship's jackstaff at the bow when not underway or when the ship is dressed);
- a Masthead pennant (worn at the masthead, except when displaced by an admiral's flag or commodore's broad pennant).

In addition, each principal command in the Royal Navy also has its own king's colour which is a variation of the White Ensign, with its dimensions altered to mirror those of the colours of infantry regiments. In the centre is the royal cypher of the reigning monarch within the Garter, surmounted by the crown.

Unlike the colours of regiments in the Army, the king's colours of the Royal Navy are identical with no battle honours. The following units hold a king's colour of the Royal Navy:

- Naval Aviation Command (ACOS (AV)), HMS Heron)
- Submarine Command (CAPTFASFLOT), HMS Neptune)
- Fleet (CINCFLEET HQ)
- Britannia Royal Naval College
- Surface Flotilla (MWS, HMS Collingwood)
- Royal Naval Reserve (COMMARRES, HMS Vivid)

The Royal Fleet Auxiliary also holds a king's colour, unique for a civilian organisation. It is a variation of the RFA's Blue Ensign, with the dimensions altered to mirror the Royal Navy King's Colour. It has the same royal cypher in the centre.

=== Europe ===
==== Belgium ====
Infantry units have a drapeau / vaandel, a square vertical tricolour of black, yellow, and red based on the national flag within a 15 mm wide gold fringe, the whole being 90 cm square. The names of battle honours for which the unit was cited are embroidered in gold in French on the obverse and in Dutch on the reverse, in straight lines.

==== Denmark ====
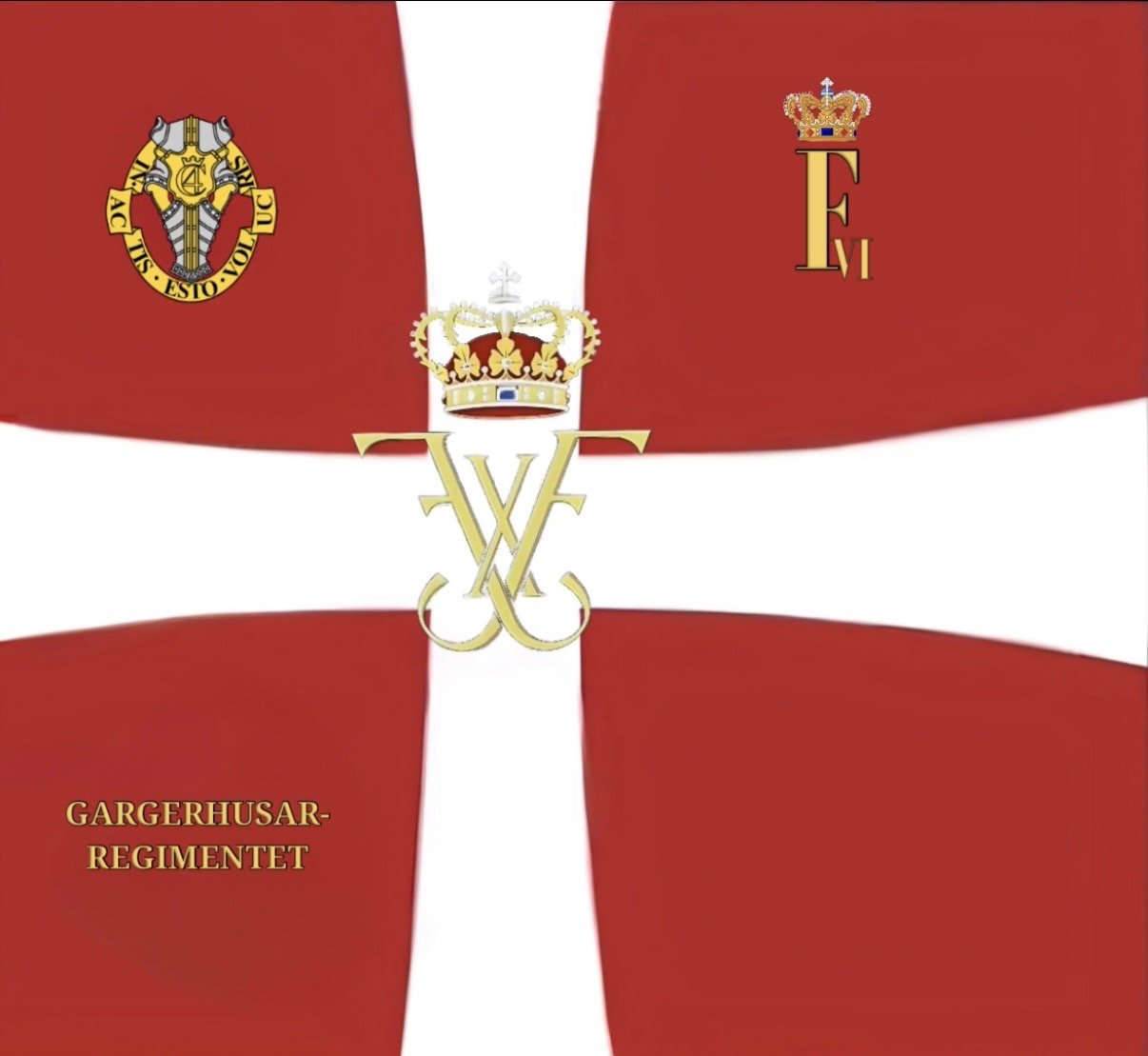
The Guard Hussar Regiment's Colours

Danish Navy, Army and Air Force units carry a unit colour (Danish: regimentsfane) and for the Life Guards a battalion colour (bataljonsfane), which measures 105 × 140 cm, former horse units a slightly smaller guidon. The flag is a variation of the Dannebrog, with a curvilinear white Dannebrog cross, called the Mantova cross, set with its centre about one-half the width of the hoist from the hoist edge. The royal cypher is embroidered in gold over the centre of the cross, the unit badge in gold in the upper hoist, and the unit number, name or both in gold in the lower hoist. Some regiments have additional marks in the upper fly. The Jyske Dragonregiment, for instance, has Prince Henrik's cipher in the upper fly. The finial is an ornate gold openwork spearhead with the royal cypher in the centre. Attached below the spearhead can be one or more campaign streamers (fanebånd). The colour is decorated with a gold cord with two tassels and bordered with a thin strip of gold cord. The sleeve holding the colour to the pike is attached with ornamental nails, the first three of which represent the sovereign, the Fatherland, and the Union.

==== Finland ====
Units of the Finnish Defence Forces have a single colour if they are brigades or brigade-equivalent (joukko-osasto). Units that are battalions or equivalent (joukkoyksikkö) may have a colour. A battalion colour is called "traditional" if it belongs to a battalion or a regiment that has formerly been separate, but is now part of a brigade. When used in parades, all brigade and battalion colours are always ceremonially guarded by two armed officers carrying sabres, while the colour bearer is usually an NCO. Companies and their equivalents may have pennants or flags, but these are carried within the ranks of the unit and never given a colour guard. Only units that give military training (either by training conscripts or by being military educational institutions for career personnel) have a right to their own colour. Headquarters of various levels, military bands and military institutions under Defence Command do not have a colour of their own and when needed, use the swallow-tailed Flag of Finland as their State Colour in place of a normal colour.

Jääkärilippu, the colour of 27th Royal Prussian Jaeger Battalion, is carried immediately behind the national flag in all Finnish Defence Forces national parades

The Finnish Army, Navy and the Air Force do not have service-specific colours. In national parades, they are always represented by a brigade-level unit carrying its own colour. However, the Jaeger Colour (jääkärilippu), the historical colour of the 27th Jaeger Battalion is always carried in the national parades of the Defence Forces on 4 June and 6 December each year, immediately behind the national flag. This position recognises the deep effect that the jaeger movement and its members, who became the trainers and leaders of the young military, and many of whom became division and corps commanders in the Second World War, had on the Finnish Defence Forces at all levels: in culture, doctrine and leadership.

The military oath is always given in the presence of the colour of the brigade-level unit.

Finnish military vexillology is a mixture of Scandinavian, German and Russian tradition. The original unit colours issued in 1918–19 were mostly modelled after Swedish regimental flags of the 17th century, which meant that no national style of unit colour was even attempted: the Swedish 17th century colours featured diverse provincial and unit emblems which was taken as the leading theme. In addition, some units were issued flags reminiscent of Russian or German traditions. After the Second World War, when not only infantry but also artillery, combat support, air force and naval units were issued colours following Western influence as well as that of the Soviet Union, the new colours featured the traditional colours of a service branch or a shared design element, for example the black flags of most engineer units. Combined with a century of organisational changes, this results in a very rich diversity of colours and symbolism, as illustrated by the gallery below.

It is possible for the unit colour to bear a unit-level decoration, which is either a Cross of Liberty, 4th class or only the ribbon of the same. All non-school units bearing decorations are decorated for Finnish Civil War merits, but a number of military schools and academies bear decorations awarded for the collective World War II merits of their cadets and alumni.

The finial of the staff is a stylised openwork spearhead with the Finnish Lion, unless the unit has received a Cross of Liberty, which is carried as a finial. Pori Brigade, however, uses an unadorned spearhead as the finial of its colour, having received its colour already in April 1918, before the regulations on colours were given.

Units and institutions of the Finnish Defence Forces which have not received a colour of their own use the unadorned swallow-tailed flag of Finland as their state colour. In Finnish practice, flag of Finland never has a fringe. However, the unit colours of dragoon, jaeger, signals and artillery units have a fringe.

The colour of the Finnish Guard Jaeger Regiment. The cross form of the flag, typical for Imperial Russian colours and also used in the Jääkärilippu, is symbolic of the lineage of the regiment as part of the Russian imperial guard.

The colour of the Armoured Brigade, introduced in 1988, features the black and silver branch colours of Finnish armoured troops while the main emblem is a cuirassier helmet symbolizing armoured force. The minor device is the unit badge of the brigade.

The colour of the Pori Brigade features the blue and yellow colours of Satakunta, and the coats of arms of Satakunta and Finland Proper on its two sides. The colour carries the ribbon of the Order of the Cross of Liberty as a streamer.

The traditional colour of the Kymi Jaeger Battalion, today a part of the Karelia Brigade, is of the form defined for light infantry. The Kymi Jaeger Battalion follows the traditions of the 3rd Bicycle Battalion and carries that number on its colour, and the Order of the Cross of Liberty both as a streamer and as the point of the staff.

The traditional colour of the Eastern Finland Signals Battalion, part of the Karelia Brigade, has the branch colours of signals corps: purple and gold. The device featuring a western capercaillie is a throwback to the earlier designation as Central Finland Signals Battalion, with capercaillie being the heraldic symbol of that province. The main device, the three lightning bolts, is symbolic of communication.

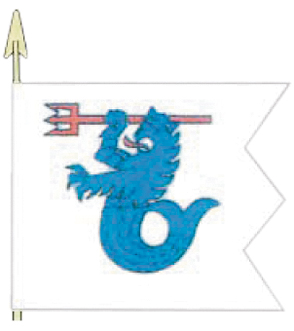
The traditional colour of the 7th Surface Combat Flotilla of the Coastal Fleet features a blue merlion adapted from the Lion of Finland, striking with a trident.

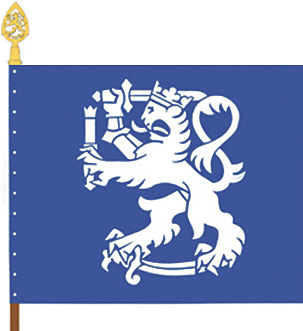
The colour of the Finnish Defence Forces International Centre features a Lion of Finland holding a herald's staff in addition to a sword. The shade of blue is the same as in the flag of the United Nations.

The colour of the Karelian Air Command features, like all Finnish Air Force colours, a swastika within a winged circle. The identifying device is a small coat of arms of Karelia

The colour of the Utti Jaeger Regiment features a griffin, representing domination of both air and land. The stylized swastika resembles the spinning rotor of a helicopter and reminds of unit emblem used by the Detached Battalion 4 of World War II.

The colour of the Kainuu Jaeger Battalion, part of the Kainuu Brigade, follows the traditional swallow-tailed format of infantry units. The flag features the family crest of the founder of the city of Kajaani, count Brahe, as well as the symbol of the 14th Division which was formed and fought in the vicinity.

The colour of the Finland Proper Logistics Battalion, introduced in 2016, features the coat of arms of the eponymic province.

==== France ====
In January 1188, in a meeting between Henry II of England and Philip II of France, it was agreed that both would go on a crusade, and that Henry II would use a white cross and Philip II would use a red cross. Later on, this usage was inverted, and the English took to using a red cross on white, and the French a white cross on red.

===== Background =====
As the use of regimental colours spread in Europe, the habit developed of using a symmetric white cross as the basis of the design of the French regimental flags, and by the 18th century almost every regiment had a white cross. The regiments were distinguished by the colours of the cantons.

After the French Revolution and the appearance of the new Tricolore, crosses disappear in 1794 and various arrangements of the tricolour come into use. Napoleon standardizes first in 1804 to a white field chape-chausse of red and blue, and in 1812 to the modern French flag. Atop of the staff of colours of the Napoleonic army the Imperial Eagle (modelled after the Ancient Roman Aquila) was placed, which actually rose to be more important symbol of the regiment than colours itself.

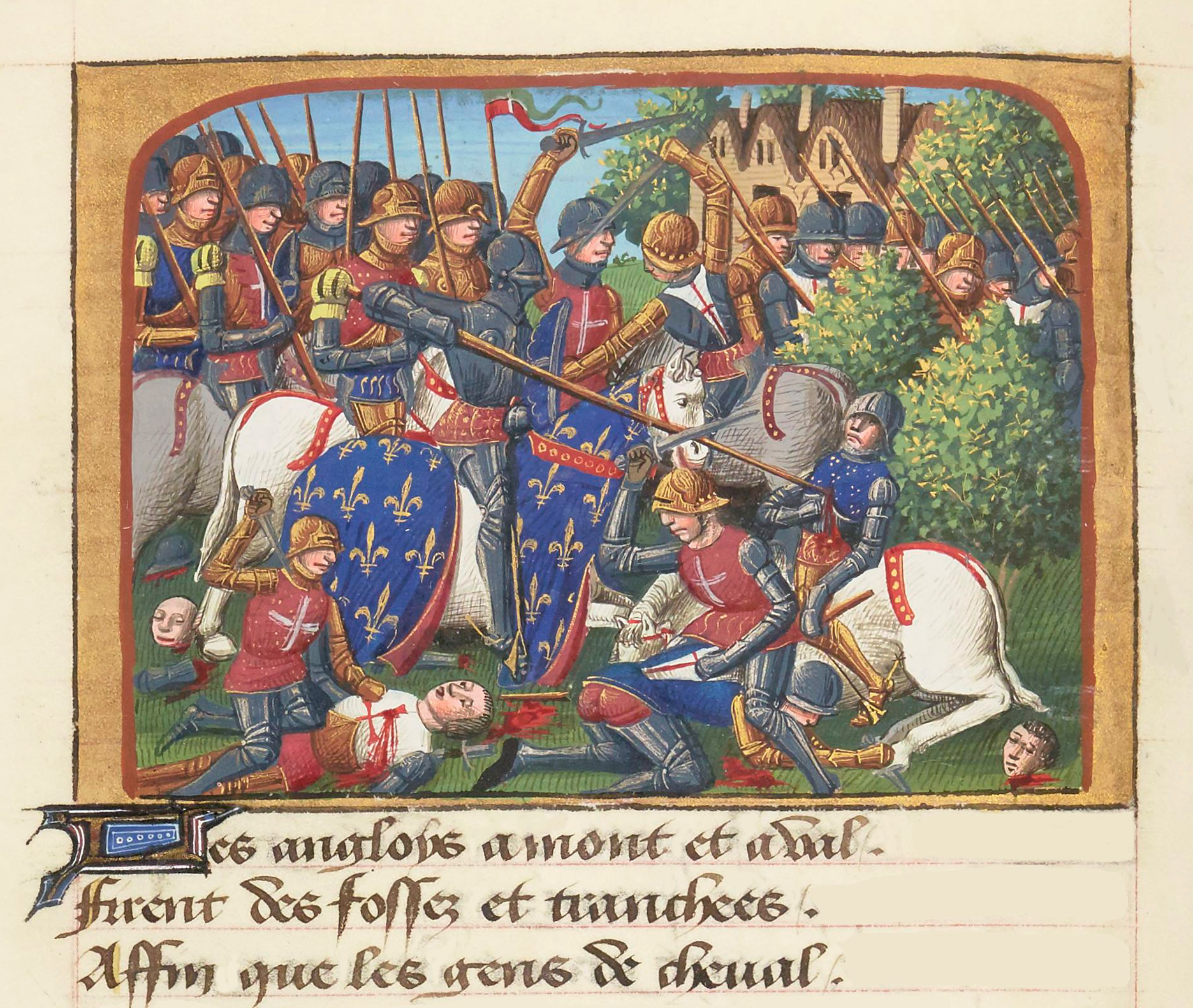
French, white cross, and English, red cross, fighting at the battle of Formigny during the Hundred Years' War.

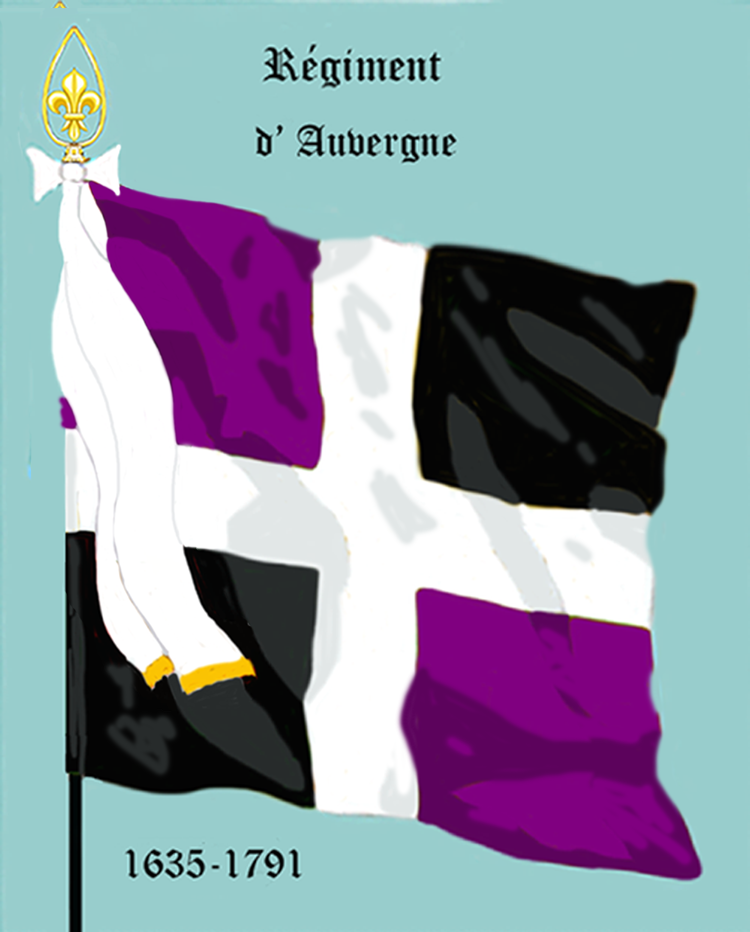
Regiment of Auvergne.

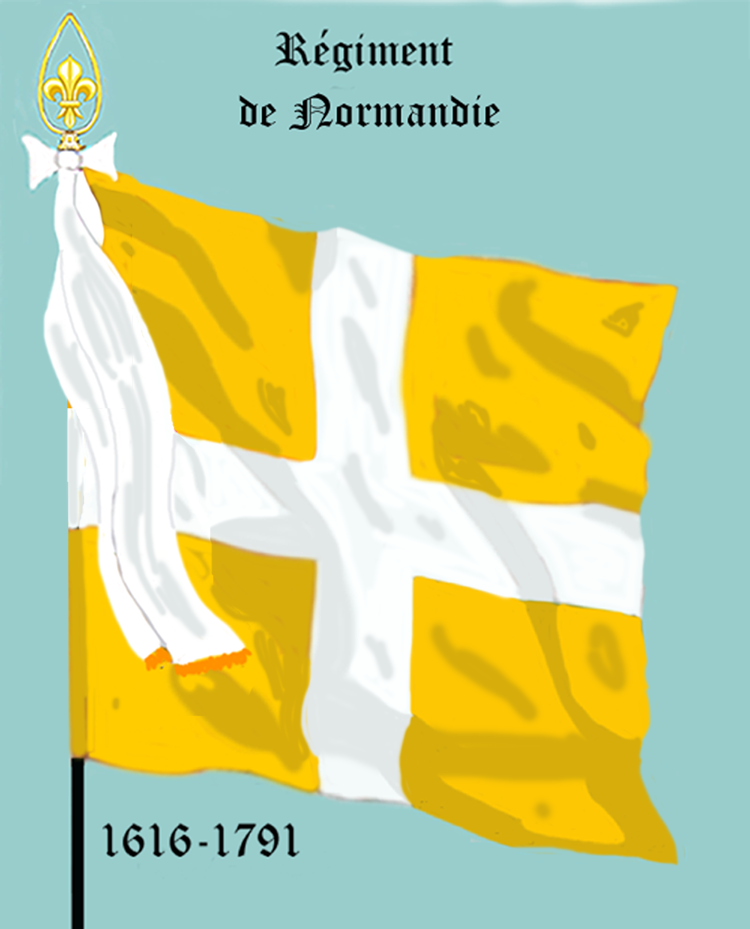
Regiment of Normandy.

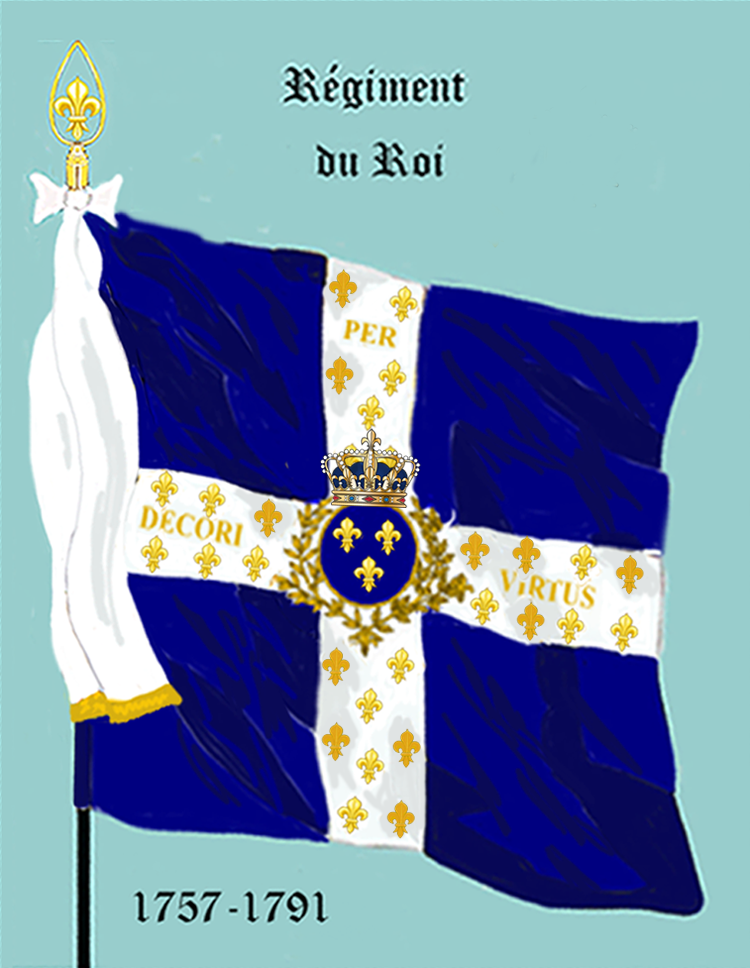
King's Regiment (Régiment du Roi).

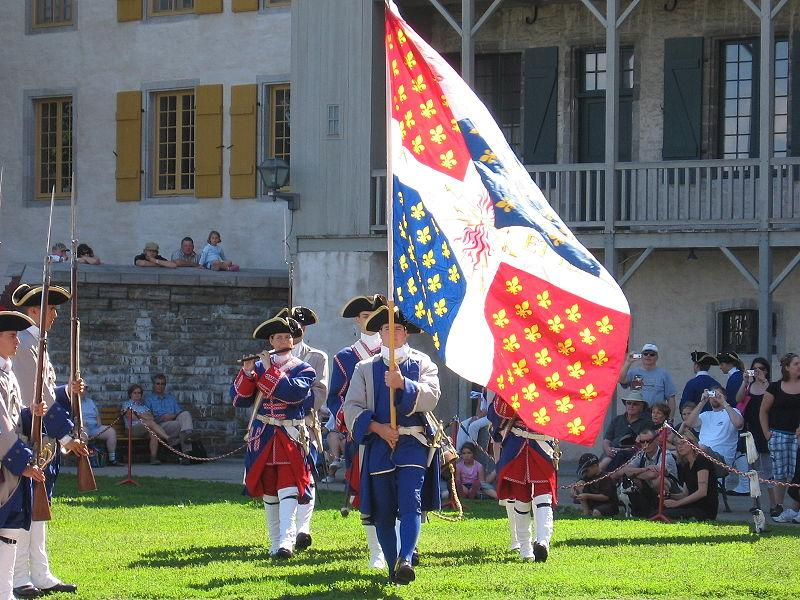
The pre-revolutionary regimental flags inspired the flag of Quebec (here, the Compagnies Franches de la Marine).

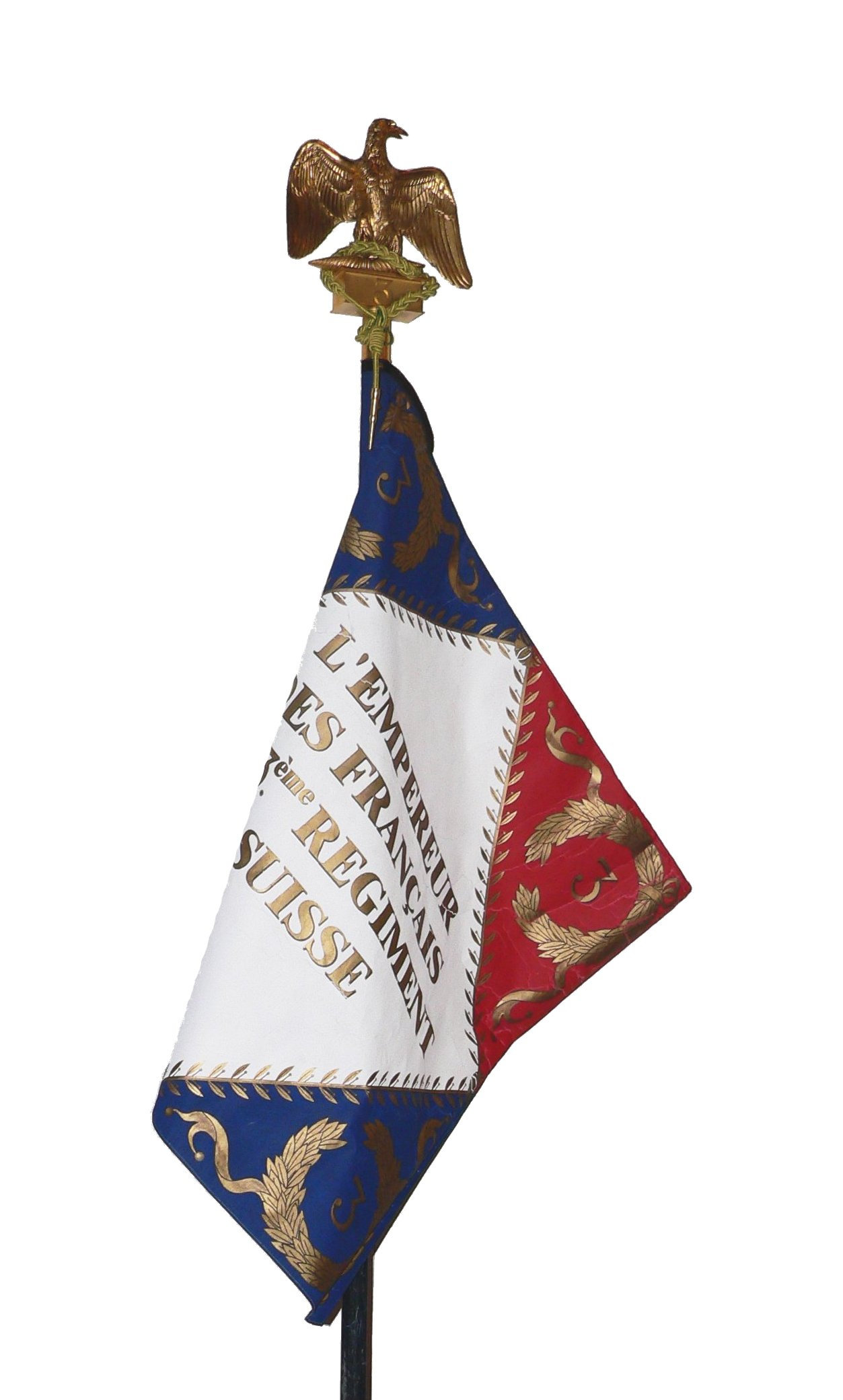
French Imperial regimental flag with its Eagle (1804–1812).

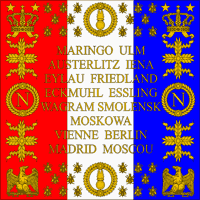
Regimental flag of the 1st Regiment of Grenadiers of the French Imperial Guard (1812).

===== Battle honours on current colours =====
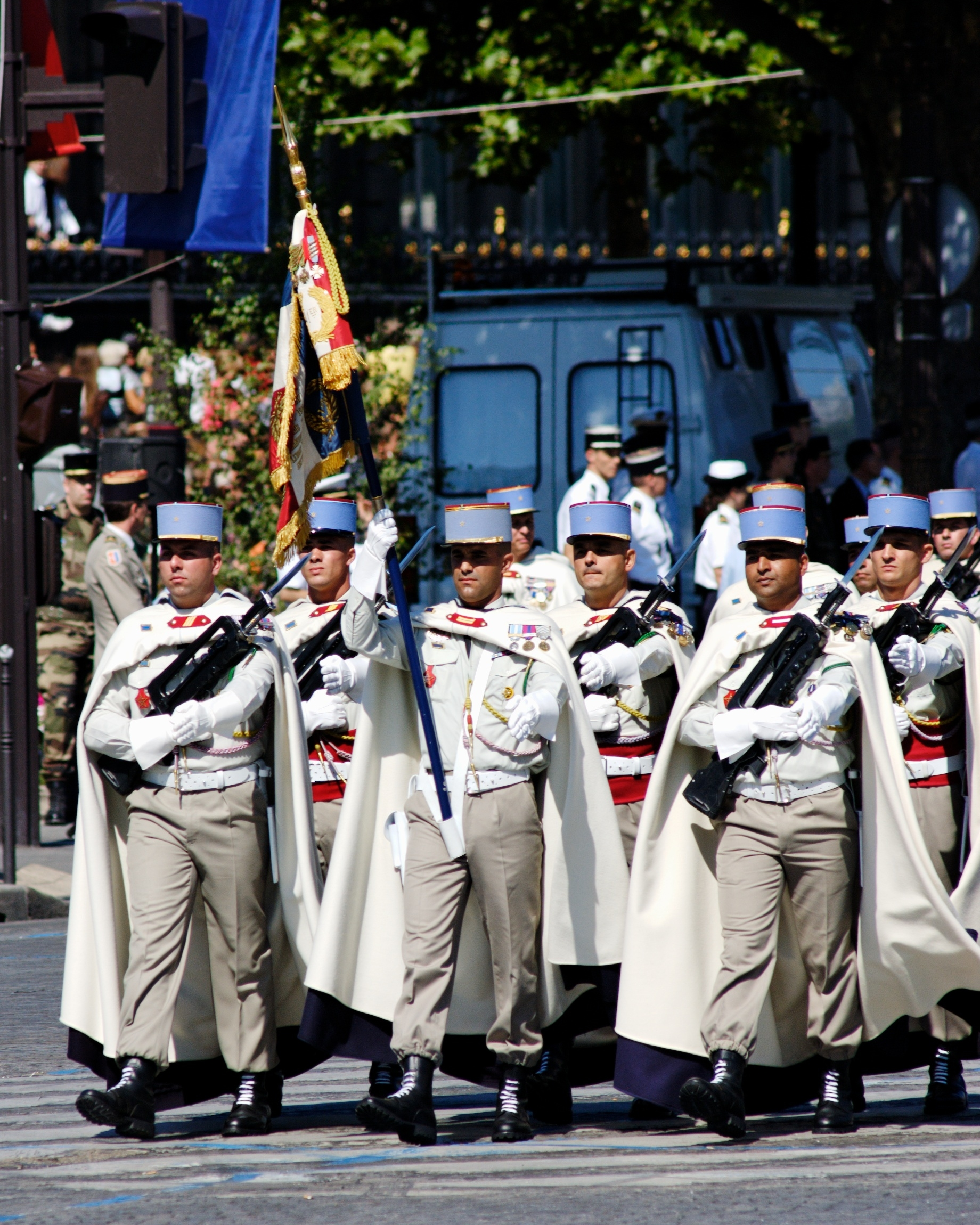
Standard of the 1st Spahi Regiment in 2008. This unit has inherited the flag and battle honours of the 1st Moroccan Spahis of the Army of Africa.

The modern French Armed Forces are not officially considered to be the successors of the Royal Army and Navy, although many of their individual units trace their histories to before the foundation of the First Republic. Accordingly, battles fought and won by the Royal Army and Navy before the French Revolution (such as Patay, Fontenoy, Chesapeake, Porto Praya and so on) do not appear as battle honours on regimental colours. The names of battles of the old times, however, which are rightly still considered as glorious by the modern French Army, are honoured by being given to ships or armoured vehicles, and remembered by anniversaries.

As an example, the 1st Infantry Regiment, founded in 1479 during the reign of Louis XI, has fought a number of battles since the 15th century, but its battle honours are only recorded from 1792 onwards:

- Valmy 1792
- Fleurus 1794
- Moeskirch 1800
- Biberach 1800
- Miliana 1842
- Guise 1914
- Verdun – L'Yser 1916–1917
- La Somme 1916
- L'Ourcq 1918
- Résistance Berry 1944
- AFN 1952–1962.

===== Latest official regulations =====
The following official documents relate to the colours of the Land Army (armée de Terre) :

- recommendation (circulaire) 808 EMM/CAB of 5 December 1985 rules what sorts of units can be given colours, abiding to previous regulations of joint services;
- decision 12350/SGA/DPMA/SHD/DAT of 14 September 2007 deals with the inscriptions of battle honours upon the colours and standards of the units of the Army, the Defence Health service and the Military Fuel Service;
- government order of 19 November 2004 relates to the award of the AFN 1952–1962 battle honour to the colours and standards of Army and Services units.

===== Army in general =====
- Regimental colours of units which are traditionally on foot, such as Infantry regiments of the line, Marine Infantry, Foreign Legion Infantry, Parachute Infantry, Engineers, Signal Corps and Military Colleges are called drapeaux (flags).
- Regimental colours of the (traditionally) mounted units of the Armoured Cavalry Branch and other cavalry units such as Dragoon Paratroopers, Hussar Paratroopers, Legion Cavalry, Artillery (including Marine Artillery, Legion Artillery, etc.), Transportation, Army Aviation, and Materiel, are called étendards (standards).

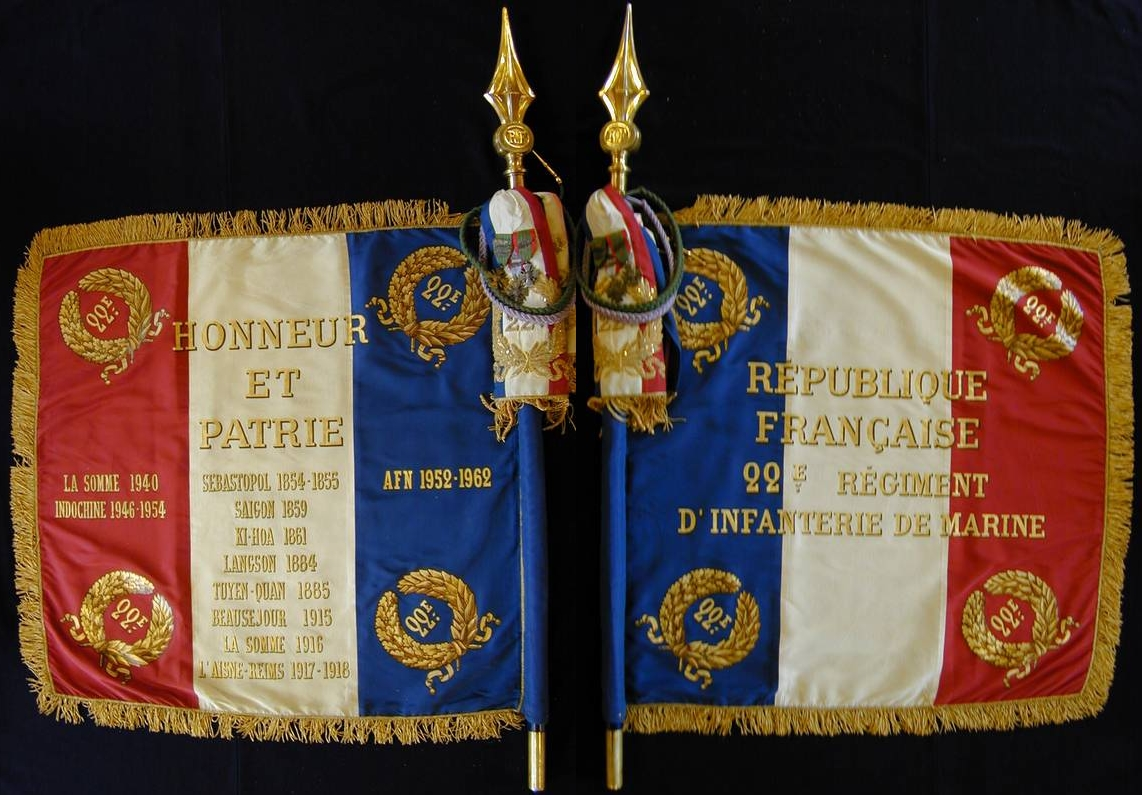
Flag of the 22nd Marine Infantry Regiment

Regimental colours are 90 cm × 90 cm Tricolore silk square flags – standards are smaller: 64 cm × 64 cm – surrounded by a golden fringe. Both are set on a stave (2.11 m long and 32 mm diameter – staves for standards are slightly shorter) ended by a 38 cm pike-shaped finial with a cartouche bearing the initials "RF" for République française on one side, and the name or number of the unit on the other side.

The cravate hanging from the pike is made of two tricolour silk ribbons, 90 cm long and 24 cm wide, ended by an 8 cm gold fringe on which the unit number or monogram is embroidered in gold, encircled by an oak and laurel wreath. French decorations and fourragères (Note: The modern fourragère of the French Army is awarded to all members of military units which have been awarded a mention in despatches. It should not be confused with unit awards of particular decorations, where the medal itself is hung on the colour of the unit. For example, there are many units wearing the fourragère of the Médaille militaire, whereas only six units wore the medal on their colours. See also the article dealing with the Croix de Guerre.) awarded to the unit are pinned or tied to the cravate; foreign awards and decorations are borne on a red velvet cushion.

All writings on the colour are embroidered in gold, as well the unit number (or monogram) encircled in antique oak and laurel wreath in each corner of the colour.

Obverse of a colour:

- République française
- (Name of the unit)

Reverse of a colour:

- Honneur (Honour)
- Et (and)
- Patrie (Fatherland)
- (Battle Honours)

===== Rifle battalions (chasseurs à pied) =====
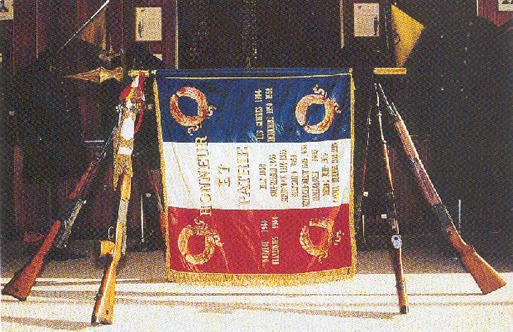
The Drapeau des chasseurs

By tradition, all the Army's rifle battalions (the bataillons de chasseurs à pied together with the chasseurs alpins) share a single collective colour. Individual battalions have pennants (fanions) and the Colour of the Rifles (Drapeau des chasseurs) is held each year in turn by a different rifle battalion. As a result, the single gold-fringed colour displays all the battle honours earned by every rifle infantry battalion.

===== Other specific colours =====
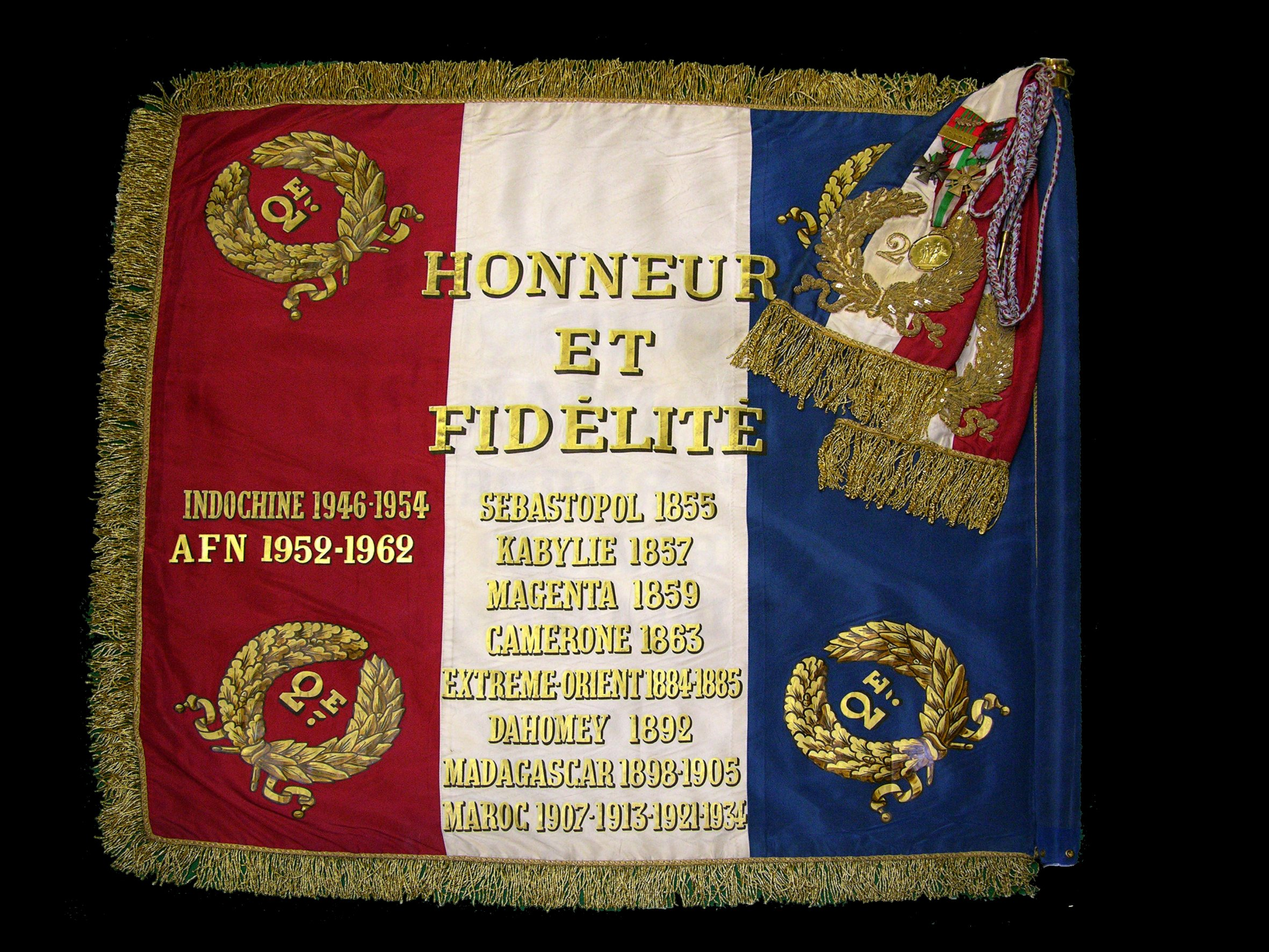
Colour of the 2nd Foreign Infantry Rgt bearing the motto "Honneur et Fidélité"

- Since 1844, the obverse of Foreign Legion regimental colours do not carry the motto "Honneur et Patrie" but "Honneur et Fidélité" (Honour and Fidelity). This motto was originally written on the flags of the Swiss regiments in French service, such as the Régiment de Diesbach (85th Infantry of the line).
- The École polytechnique, as a military college, also has a colour which does not carry "Honneur et Patrie" but instead "Pour la Patrie, les Sciences et la Gloire" (For the Fatherland, Sciences and Glory). The reverse of the École polytechnique's colour has one battle honour written under the motto: Défense de Paris 1814, awarded in 1901 by President Émile Loubet.
- Since 1880, the motto of the Paris Fire Brigade (which is a military unit belonging to the Engineering Arm), "Dévouement et Discipline" (Devotion and Discipline), is written under "Honneur et Patrie".
- The reverse of the Saint-Cyr Military College's colour has seven lines: Honneur / et / patrie / Ils s'instruisent pour vaincre / Premier / bataillon / de France (Honour / and / Fatherland / They study for victory / First / battalion / of France).

===== Air Force =====
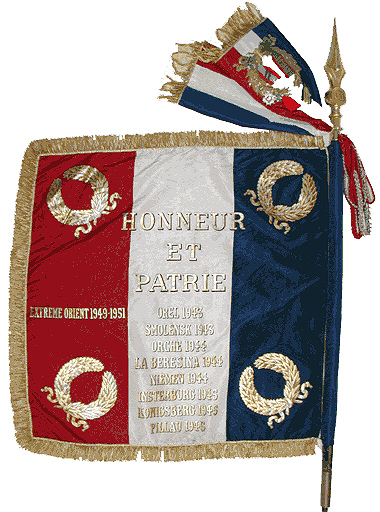
Flag of Sqn 1/30 Normandie-Niémen kept at BA112 Reims-Champagne

The colours of Air Force (armée de l'Air) units are by all means similar to those of the Army from which it separated as an independent military arm in 1933. Colours are generally not bestowed to Air Force units smaller than escadres (wings), land combat wings, air force and space bases, instruction centres or air force training colleges.

===== National Gendarmerie =====
The units of the National Gendarmerie (Gendarmerie nationale) have colours which are very similar to those of the Army. Each region (formerly legion), instruction centre, college or Republican Guard Regiment has its colour or standard, altogether 56 colour and 2 standards. The reverse of colours of the Departmental Gendarmerie units and Gendarmerie instruction centres have the same motto as the Land Army units (Honneur et Patrie), but the colours of the Mobile Gendarmerie have their own particular motto: Valeur et Discipline (Valour and Discipline). Most subordinate or smaller units use 50 cm large × 40 cm high pennants.

The National Gendarmerie also has its own official colour, under the armed guard of the Directorate General, on which five battle honours are registered:

- Hondschoote 1793
- Villodrigo 1812
- Taguin 1843
- Sébastopol 1855
- Indochine 1945–1954

===== National Navy =====
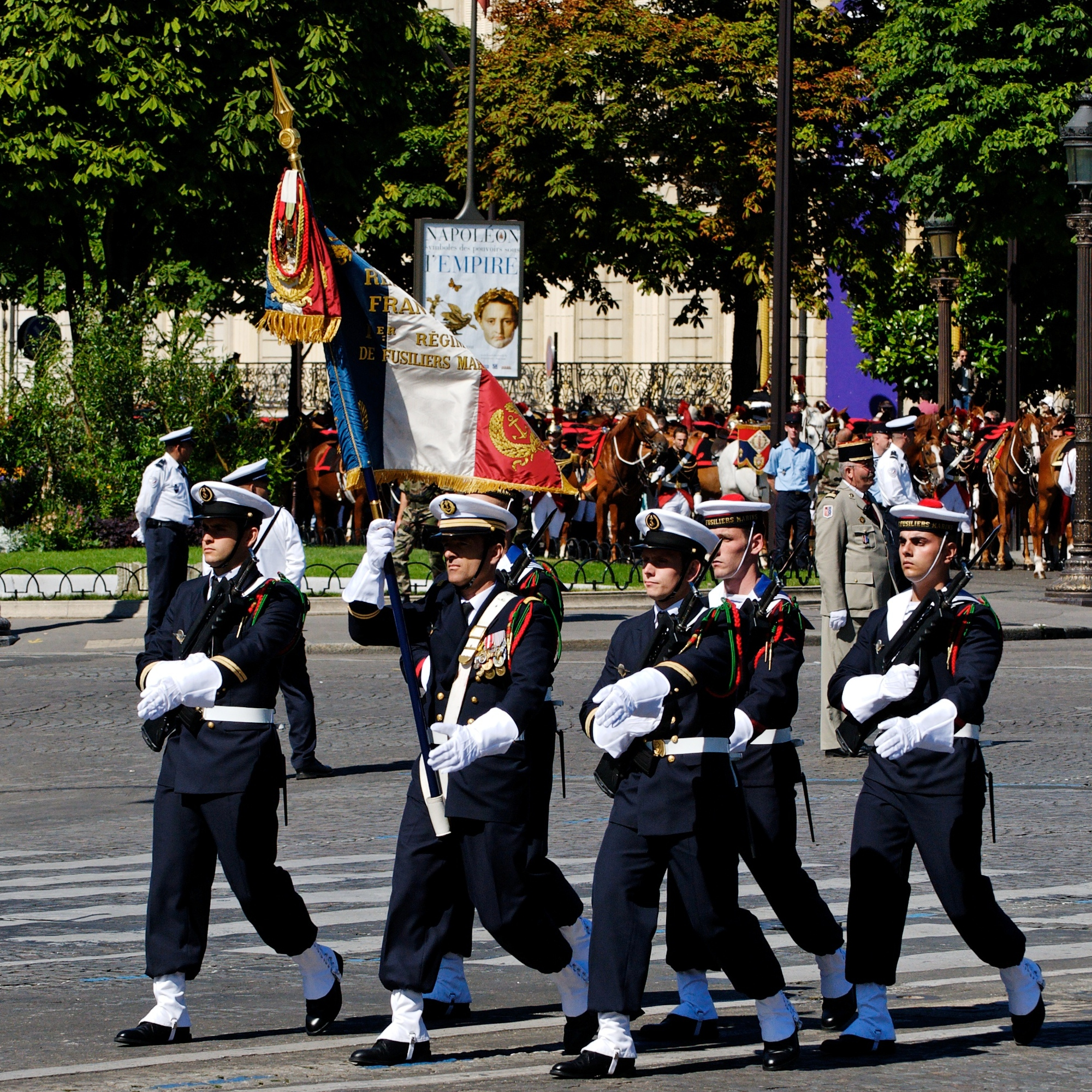
Regimental flag of the 1st Naval Fusiliers at the Bastille Day Military Parade

The Colours worn by the ships of the National Navy (Marine nationale) consist of the National Ensign and the jack:

- the National Ensign (Note: The ensign of the National Navy differs from the French national flag by its slightly darker blue shade, and by the dimensions of the stripes: while the stripes of the national flag has 1:1:1 proportions, the naval ensign has 30:33:37.) is flown at the stern and at the bowsprit if not replaced there by the FNFL jack or a military award jack;
- the FNFL jack is flown at the ship's jackstaff if the ship has fought with the Free French Naval Forces, or is named after such a ship;
- military award jacks may also be flown at the ship's jackstaff if the ship has received mention in dispatches (in which case crew members wear the corresponding fourragère).

Currently, only eight individual National Navy units have colours other than the National Ensign or the FNFL jack. Under recommendation 808 EMM/CAB of 5 December 1985, naval units to which colours can be bestowed must be those with manpower equivalent to that of a regiment, which are specialised in combat or services on land (or corps which have inherited their traditions from such units), and naval instruction centres or colleges. The flags are quite similar to those of Land Army units, the difference being the wreaths in corners which encircle anchors instead of the name of unit, except for the Naval Gunners (initials CM) and the Fleet Engineering Cadets College (initials EAMF).

As of today, these units are (between brackets is where the colours are currently kept):

- the 1^{er} Régiment de fusiliers marins (École des fusiliers marins) – the 1st Naval Fusiliers Regiment (Naval Fusiliers College);
- the Demi-brigade de fusiliers marins (Compagnie de fusiliers marins de Cherbourg) – the Naval Fusiliers Half-Brigade (Cherbourg Naval Fusiliers Company);
- the Canonniers marins (Centre d' instruction naval de Saint-Mandrier) – the Naval Gunners (Saint-Mandrier Naval Instruction Centre);
- the École navale (Groupe des écoles du Poulmic) – the Naval College (Poulmic Schools Group);
- the École militaire de la flotte (Groupe des écoles du Poulmic) – the Fleet Military College (Poulmic Schools Group);
- the École des mousses (Centre d'instruction naval de Brest) – the Cabin Boys College (Brest Naval Instruction Centre);
- the École des apprentis mécaniciens de la flotte (Centre d' instruction naval de Saint-Mandrier)' – the Fleet Engineering Cadets College (Saint-Mandrier Naval Instruction Centre);
- the Bataillon de marins pompiers de Marseille (Bataillon de marins pompiers de Marseille) – the Marseille Marine Fire Battalion (The Marseille Marine Fire Battalion).

===== French influence =====
====== Nations of the former French Empire ======
Many of today's armed forces of independent countries that once were part of the French Empire share customs and traditions closely similar if not identical to those of the French military regarding organisation of military arms, army and navy rank structures and uniform styles. Indeed, in countries where the decolonisation process had been conducted through peaceful political negotiations (chiefly French West Africa and French Equatorial Africa), French colonial units were sometimes directly inherited by the former colonies where they had been raised to form the basis of the new national armies. This legacy not only included colour etiquette (the way colours are respected, taken care of and paraded), but also design, adapted to new national flag designs.

On the contrary, in countries where independence came as the aftermath of bloody wars of liberation, such as in Vietnam and Algeria, due to the Cold War context, French military culture was strongly rejected often only to be replaced by communist Soviet or Chinese style military culture (colours, ranks, uniforms, parade pace, etc.).

====== Other nations ======
As one of the World's great powers together with Great Britain, France did not only exercise its influence by conquest, but also by the prestige of its military. At the height of European colonial expansion in the 19th century, France's army and Britain's navy were each regarded as the most powerful forces ever on land and at sea. This lead many a military to copy both powers' military and naval cultures. As most navies in the World adopted the British naval looks (double-breasted navy blue jacket and peaked cap for officer, blue jean collar for ratings, etc.), numerous land armies adopted French-inspired uniforms during the 1860s and 1870s (both Union and Confederate armies during the American Civil War, the Chilean Army of the War of the Pacific, the Imperial Russian Army, etc.) and even sometimes imported types of French units (e.g. Zouave regiments). France's influence on military fashion dimmed for the time being after the unexpected French defeat ending the Franco-Prussian War of 1870–1871. Many armies then changed to adopt Prussian military style (as a perfect example of this trend, Chilean soldiers traded their kepis for Pickelhauben).

As far as regimental colours are concerned, French influence was mainly to be seen in armies of smaller European powers with strong cultural, economical or political ties to France, notably in such countries whose national flag itself was patterned after the French national flag, such as Belgium or Romania.

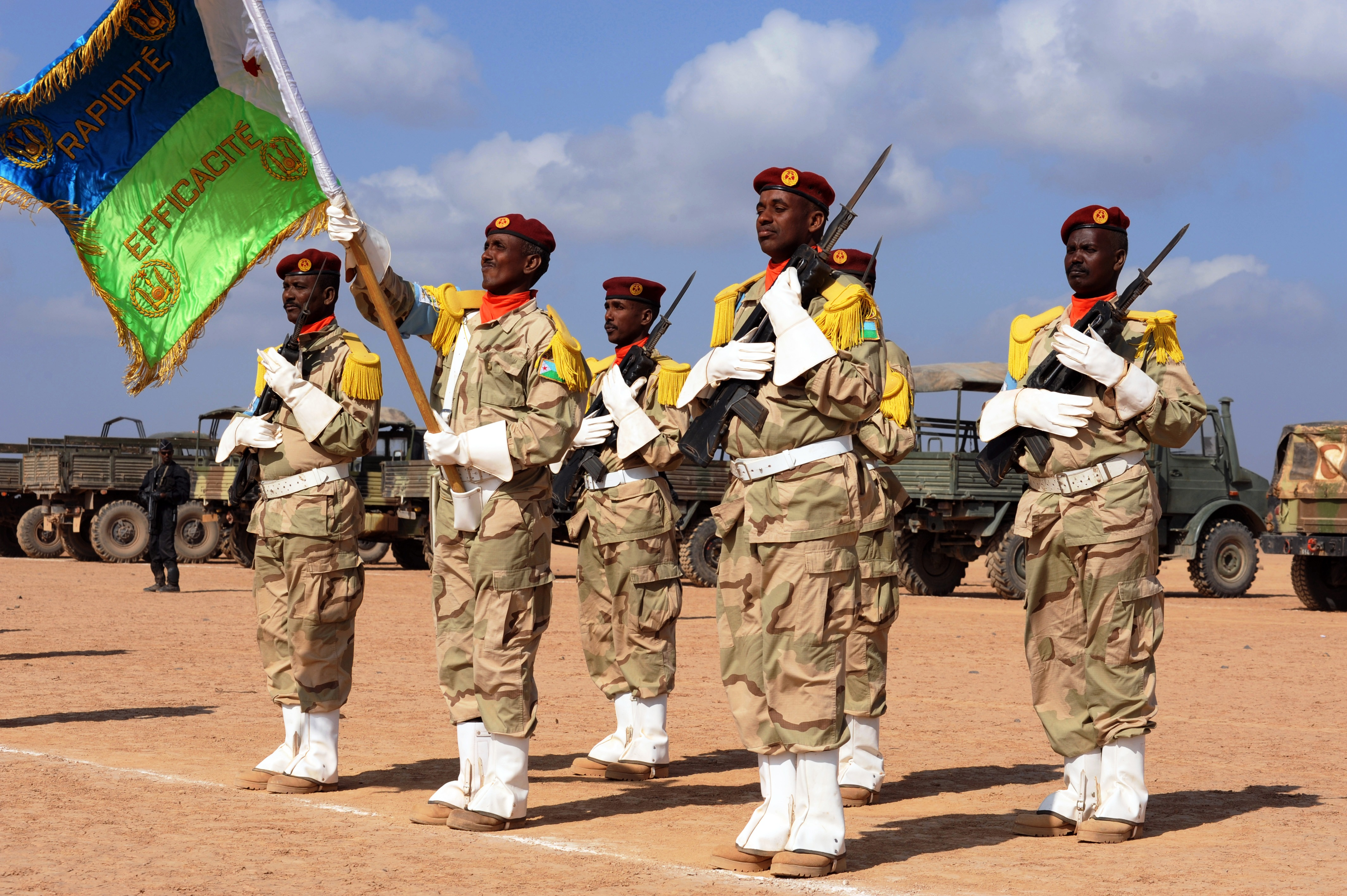
Djiboutian colours: French influence through legacy.

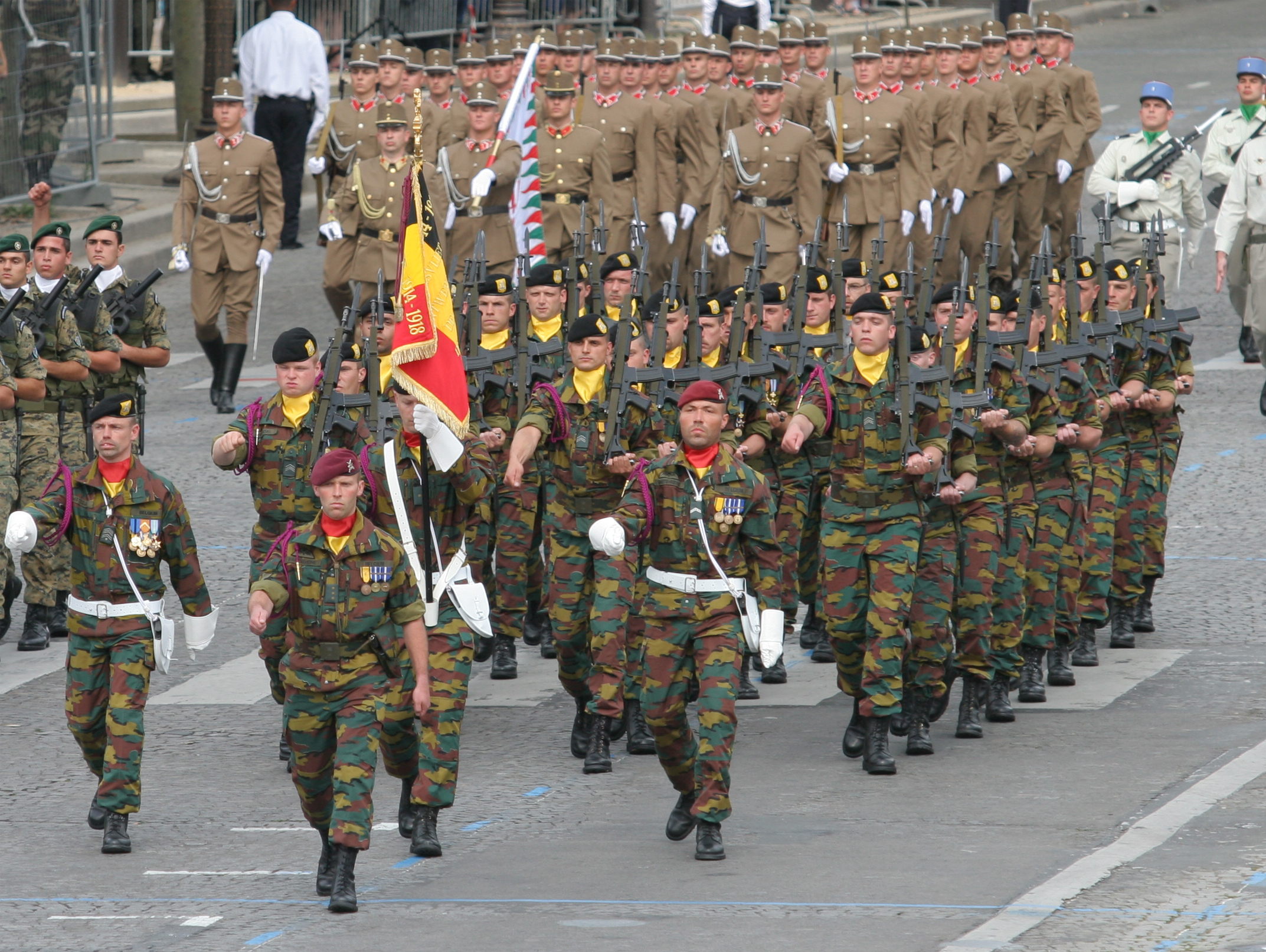
Belgian colours: French influence through common culture.

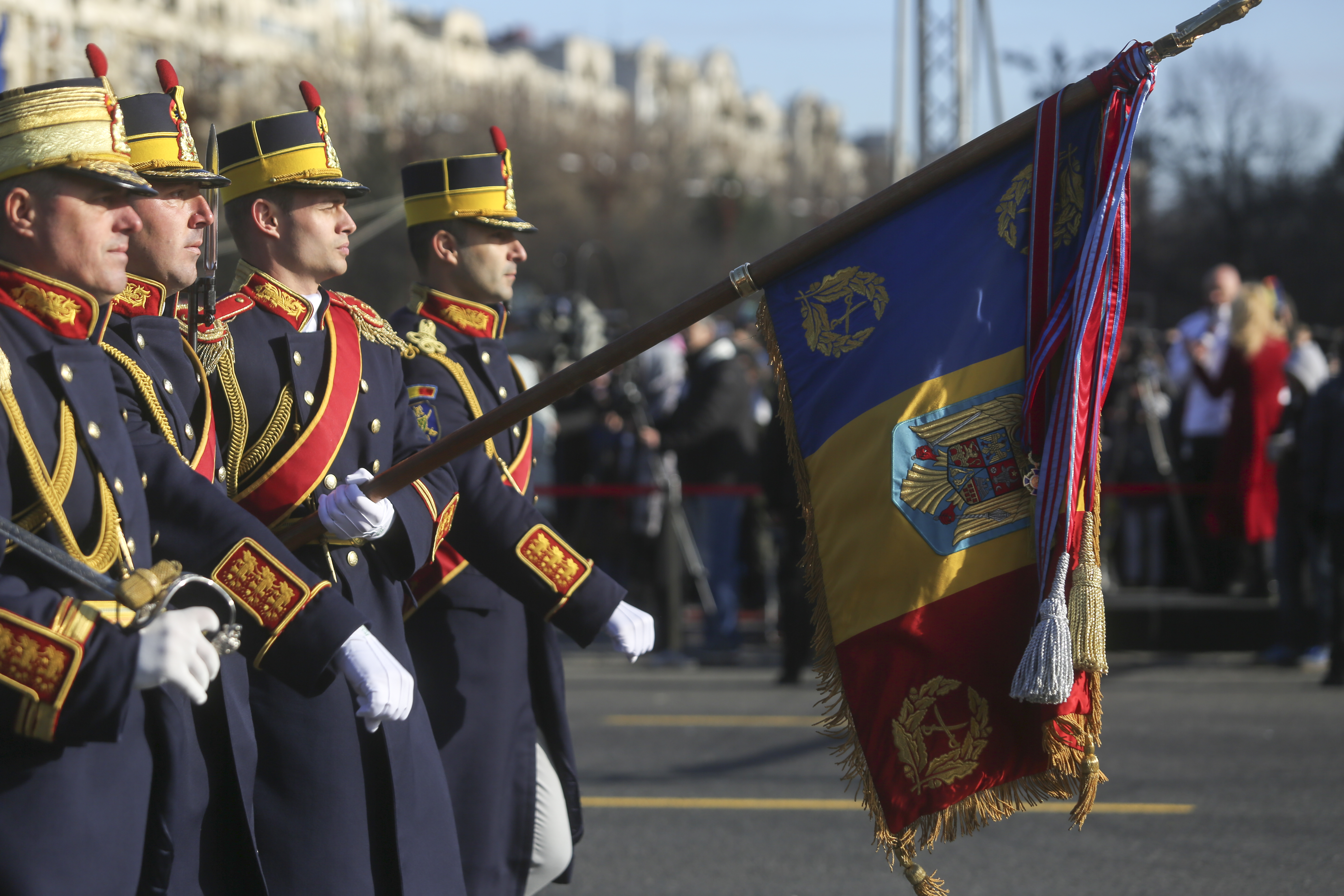
Romanian colours: French influence through prestige.

==== Germany ====
German Truppenfahne

Units of the Bundeswehr have only a single Colour. The Truppenfahne is a square version of the national flag with the Bundesadler (national shield) overall in the centre. The flag is surrounded by a black, red, and gold lacework border and edged on three sides by gold fringe. The finial is a gilt bronze openwork spearhead surrounding a black and silver Iron Cross. Below the finial, a streamer is attached with the unit badge at the top and its designation embroidered in gold at the end. These streamers are red for army (Heer) units, blue for the navy (Marine), and white for the air force (Luftwaffe). The streamer is the same length as the hoist of the flag.

The tradition was also observed by the National People's Army of East Germany, whose unit colours mirrored the national flag.

Until the Second World War German military units maintained colours of the Prussian pattern regardless of service branch, while the Waffen-SS followed the national flag pattern.

==== Greece ====
Hellenic Army War Flag

Traditionally, Army infantry and tank/cavalry regiments have a single colour/standard or war flag (Greek: Πολεμική Σημαία). This is blue, with a white cross and features St George and the Dragon in the centre. The flag has no distinguishing features for individual regiments, although battle honours are sometimes added to the flag; the regiment's identity is inscribed on the flagstaff. The pattern has been in use since the 1830s, with no changes between the periods of monarchy or republic. The Hellenic Army Academy has also been awarded a war flag, its cadets having participated in the Battle of Crete in 1941. Similar flags exist also for the Air Force, featuring the archangel Michael. Recently war flags were assigned to the Army NCO Academy and the Police Academy.

Unlike the Army, Police and Air Force, the Hellenic Navy uses as both the naval ensign and national colour the flag that later became the modern official national Flag of Greece. The Hellenic Coast Guard and the Hellenic Fire Service use the Navy pattern.

==== Holy See ====
Banner of the Swiss Guard with the coat-of arms of commander Christoph Graf, Pope Leo XIV and Pope Julius II.

The official colour of the Swiss Guard, the army of the Vatican City, consists of four-quarters. The Coat of Arms of the current pope is in the first quarter, while the arms of Pope Julius II are in the fourth quarter. In the second and third quarters are horizontal stripes of red, yellow and blue, the colours of the unit's uniforms. It has no gold fringe.

The flag also has the coat of arms of the commander within a wreath, on a background of the colour of his canton. The design of the flag changes with the election of a new pope and the appointment of a new commander.

==== Hungary ====
Unit colour of the Hungarian Defence Force

The 120 cm × 140 cm Unit colour of the Hungarian Defence Force is the current regulation colour of all Hungarian Defence Forces units since 15 March 1991. The flag is made of white fibres-satin. The height of the coat of arms with the crown is 57, and the width is 58 cm along with the crown. The coat of arms is made of silk with gold and silver embroidery. The edges of the flagship are surrounded by 11–11, and 9–9, 10 cm, red and green flames on the longer sides, extending 15 centimetres. The flames of the flames start and end on each side with a red colour, with the flaming tongues separated by a green circle in the four corners of the flag. The flagpole has a 5 mmm national-colour silk ribbon on its 3 free edges that do not fit the rod, with 10–10 centimetres national colour silk ribs on two free tips. The white part of the flagpole outside the party is twisted once on the pole, fixed with 3 equally spaced brass nails - 25-25-25 mm equally spaced. The flagpole is a 21-centimeter long, stylized leaf-shaped sandblasted brass, on both sides with a baroque, bronze Coat of arms of Hungary, without shield holders. The rod is 238 centimetres long, cylindrical, scarlet-lacquered, bottom-foldable in the lower third. Brass rings at the pole separation lines and a brass cap at the bottom end.

==== Italy ====
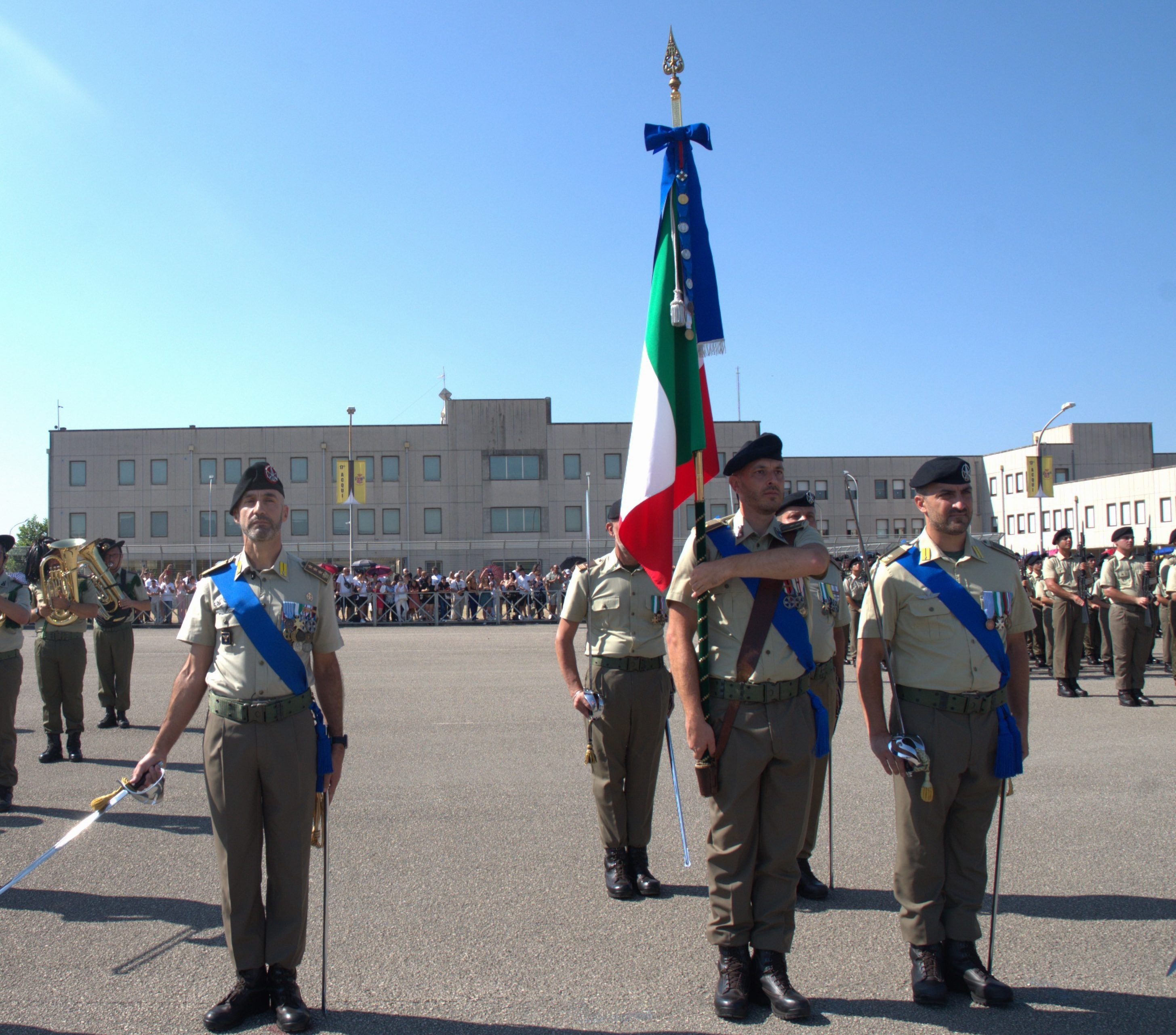
Regimental flag of the Italian Army's 17th Volunteer Training Regiment "Acqui" on parade in July 2024

The colour (bandiera di guerra) for army units (other than cavalry) is a square version of the national tricolour in silk, 99 cm × 99 cm. It is mounted on a pike 2.2 m long, made of wood covered with green velvet and decorated with ornate brass nails arranged in a spiral. The pike is topped by a 35 cm high finial consisting of an ornate gilt brass spearhead chased with a five-pointed star and the monogram RI (for Repubblica Italiana), which is in turn mounted atop a gilt brass ball on which is the name and date of establishment of the unit. The pike is adorned with two silver cords 67 cm long, each with a 10 cm long silver tassel and a blue silk cravat 8 cm × 66 cm with an 8 cm silver fringe at each end, to which the unit's decorations are pinned, the ribbons of the decorations overlapping so that the medals hang down the cravat. Italian Army cavalry units carry a stendardo (standard) of the same pattern as the bandiera di guerra, but which measures 60 cm × 60 cm.

==== Lithuania ====
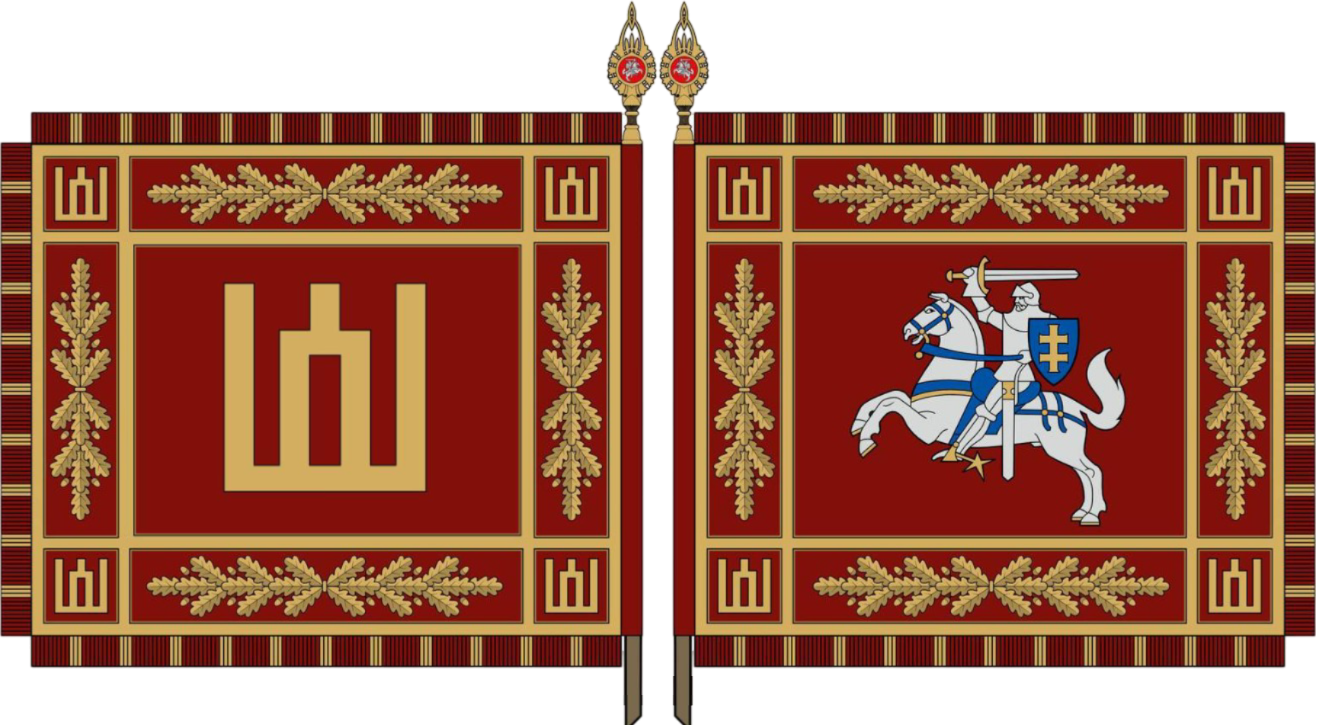
Flag of the Lithuanian Armed Forces

Lithuania's military colours under the Lithuanian Armed Forces tend to follow a mix of the Russian and British practice, as well as of US tradition, with the national flag being designated as a National Colour, but only flown by guards of honour in ceremonies. Unit colours of the Land Forces follow the Imperial Russian pattern, with the fringe in gold or bi-colour of red/green and bearing Vytis (obverse) and unit emblem (reverse) in the centre. The Naval Forces uses a ceremonial form of the naval ensign as an overall branch colour with gold fringe following British precedence.

==== Netherlands ====
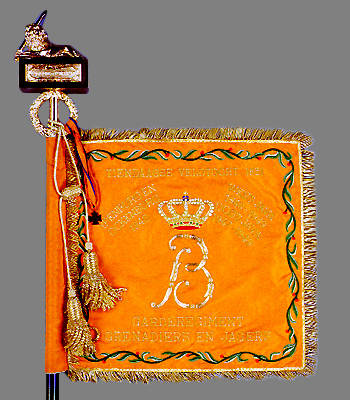
The regimental colour of the Garderegiment Grenadiers en Jagers

In the Dutch armed forces, the colour (or standard in case of the mounted (i.e. cavalry and field and horse artillery) regiments) is orange (except for the colour of the midshipman corps, which is red). All are gold fringed.

On the obverse is the royal cypher of the monarch that gave the regiment its (original) colour, with the unit's name underneath (including the year the regiment or corps was established), both in gold; around the four edges is a laurel branch. Battle honours are added in the corners of the obverse and sometimes also on the left and right of the royal cypher; if additional honours are awarded, they are placed on streamers that are attached to the pike until the presentation of a new colour. Battle honours refer to places (e.g. Waterloo or Rotterdam), areas (West-Java or Afghanistan) (seas included, for example Java-zee), or to a military campaign (Tiendaagse Veldtocht or Veldtocht van 1815); the year or years of engagement are always added, except on the colours of the Netherlands Marine Corps.

On the reverse is the arms of the Kingdom of the Netherlands without the mantle. The shield is blue and is strewn with small upright rectangles; the main device is a crowned rampant lion, holding a sword in its upper paw and a bundle of seven arrows in its lower paw. The lion and rectangles are gold, whilst the blade of the sword is silver. Supporting the shield on either side is a gold rampant lion, facing outwards towards the viewer. There is a gold crown above the shield; whilst below it is a blue scroll with the royal motto Je maintiendrai (French for 'I will maintain') in gold. The shield and lions are surrounded by a wreath of green palm and oak leaves tied together with an orange and blue ribbon, and there is another wavy gold laurel wreath around the four edges.

The Military Order of William or other decorations are attached to the pike when awarded. The pike has a finial of a lion on a plinth holding a sword and a bunch of seven arrows. Traditionally a colour is 87 cm × 87 cm (with a pike 2.50 m long). Guards regiments carry the same colour, with some differing details. The same applies to the colours carried by the Royal Military Academy and the Royal Military School. Standards measure 50 cm × 50 cm with a pike 2 m long.

Only Regiment van Heutsz has a full British-styled stand as a variant of the national flag used by the regiment in the Korean War is used as the Regimental Colour with the orange colour as the King's Colour (or Queen's).

==== Norway ====
Norwegian infantry units have a stand of colours – the first (King's Colour) is the national flag, while the second (Regimental Colour) is unique to each unit:

- Infantry: Norwegian line infantry units carry regimental colours, either of a solid colour or divided vertically into two or three stripes, with the Norwegian lion in the centre, the name of the unit, and battle honours embroidered on the field. The colours vary by regiment and derive either from historic associations with predecessor regiments or from the colours of the regiment's oldest known uniform.
- Guards: The Royal Norwegian Guards regiment has a regimental colour that is all white, again with the lion in the centre, and with the royal cypher of the reigning monarch in each corner.

==== Poland ====
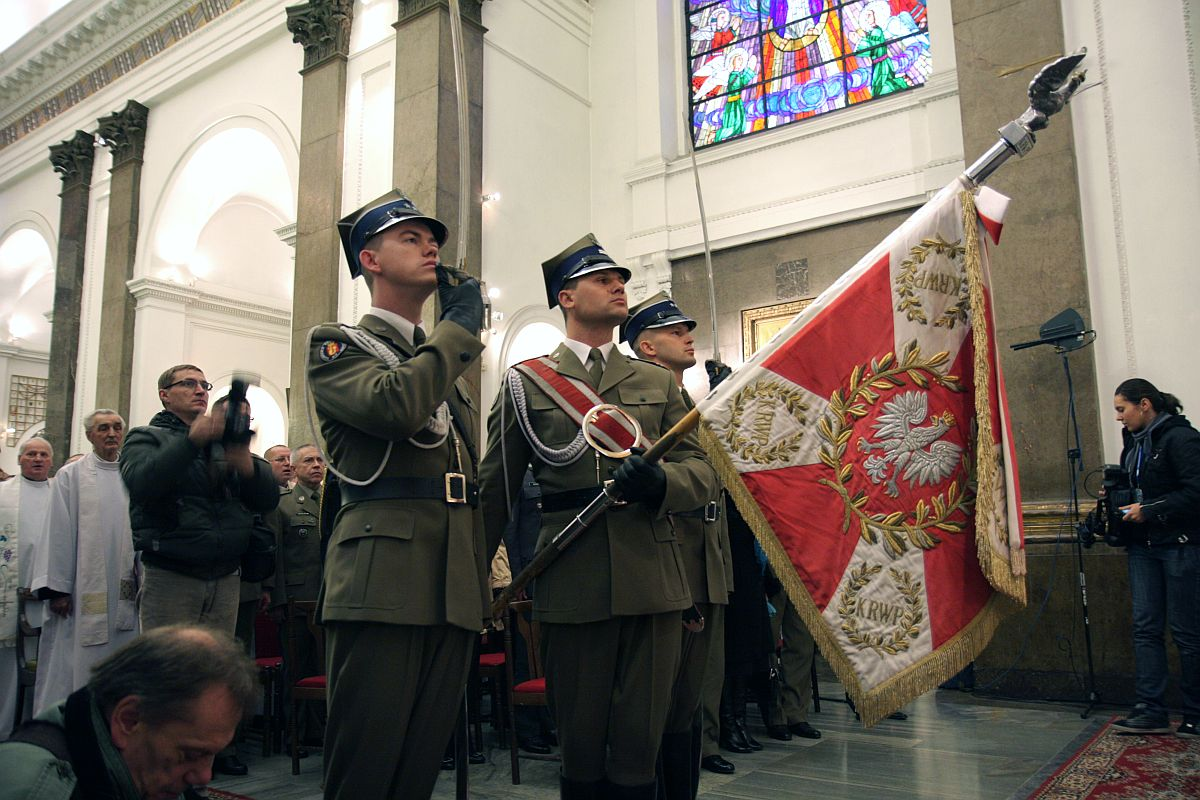
Military colours of the Representative Honor Guard Regiment of the Polish Armed Forces

The standard military colours of the Polish Armed Forces are in red and white with gold fringe, with the design tracing back to the Polish Second Republic, a standardized form based on earlier colours. The motto of the Armed Forces, "God, Honour, Fatherland" (Polish: Bóg, Honor, Ojczyzna) are at the reverse while the Polish military eagle (which differs per service) surrounded by a gold wreath is at the centre of the obverse. The unit's name is inscribed on the obverse. The eagle is also featured as the finial in all colours.

==== Portugal ====
National colours of Portugal

Each of the commands, units, forces and establishments of the Portuguese Armed Forces has a national colour, which is considered the parade version of the Flag of Portugal. The National Republican Guard, the Public Security Police and some fire departments also have national colours.

The traditional distinction between colours (Portuguese: bandeiras, literally "flags") - carried by foot units - and standards (estandartes) - carried by mounted units - was abolished in the 1960s, with all of them being uniformly reclassified as "national standards" (estandartes nacionais). At the same time, another type of standard was introduced, this being the heraldic standard, each of which reflects the particular heraldic symbology of the corresponding unit.

The official model for the military colours was established in 1911 and states that they should measure 120 cm in the hoist by 130 cm in the fly, the field being vertically divided in green and red, with the National coat of arms in the centre, surrounded by two golden olive branches tied by a white scroll containing the motto Esta é a Ditosa Pátria Minha Amada (This is my Beloved Blissful Fatherland). Despite the existence of this official model, the various branches of the Armed Forces adopted different models of colours over the years, with various designs and dimensions.

In March 2020, a uniform model of national colours was adopted for all the branches. This is based in the 1911 official model, but measuring 120 cm both in the hoist and in the fly. The name of the unit, its heraldic symbol and their battle honours are embroidered in a gravat attached to the base of the finial, the colour of the gravate varying accordingly with the branch of service. Naval units were allowed to keep the traditional Order of Christ Cross embroidered in the canton of the cloth of their national colours. The several commands, units, forces and establishments of the Armed Forces will have to replace their old national colours by the new model within 10 years.

The national colours of the National Republican Guard and of the Public Security Police follow the 1911 model and continue to keep the traditional practice of having the names of the units inside white scrolls which are inserted on the field of the flag itself.

==== Romania ====
According to the Romanian General Staff, "The military colours (drapel de luptă) are the symbol of military honour, bravery and glory. They evoke the past struggle of the Romanian people for national liberty and the traditions of unity, reminding each soldier of his sacred duty to serve the Fatherland with trust, and to defend at all costs the unity, sovereignty and independence of Romania".

The military colours are granted to military units by presidential decree, on the advice of the Minister of National Defence, the Minister of Internal Affairs or the director of the Romanian Intelligence Service. According to the Ministry of National Defence, the complete description of this military insignia is as follows:

Romanian Military colours. Air Force design

The military colours of Romania are made of double silk cloth and have dimensions of 100 × 66 cm (2:3 ratio). The canvas has the colours of the Romanian flag and its obverse is identical with the reverse. The national coat of arms, measuring 29 × 21.5 cm, is applied in the middle of the yellow stripe, 18 cm above its base. In each corner, 5 cm from the edge of the canvas, is sewed a wreath of oak leaves, which surrounds the weapon signs, all of golden thread:

- two crossed swords for land forces units
- a helicopter blade juxtaposed over a pair of wings in downward flight, a radar and a crossed rocket and telescope for the Air Force
- an anchor for the Naval Forces
- the letter J in a rhombus over two crossed swords for gendarmerie units
- the emblem of the Romanian Intelligence Service for its units

The three sides of the flag not attached to the pole are decorated with fringes of golden thread (5–7 cm long) and tassels of the same material (10–12 cm long) hang from the corners of the fly. The flag is attached to the pole by an antioxidant metal rod 70 cm long.

The pole, of brown wood, is 240 cm high and 3.5 cm in diameter. A brass cylinder is at the base, 4 cm long and closed on the bottom. The rod is attached to the pole by a brass ring, gilt on its lower part, and a 6 cm high cylindrical protective tube of the same material and gilt on its upper part. The ring (3.2 cm high) is inscribed with the name of the unit. Another brass cylinder is placed on the tip of the pole, 6 cm long and of brass. The eagle (similar to the Roman aquila), of gilt copper, sheet, 15 cm high and 11.5 cm wide, is placed over this. Looking rightward, the eagle's wings are pointed downward and it holds the thunderbolts of Jupiter in its talons. It is placed on a parallelepipedal support of the same metal (10 × 3.5 × 2 cm), which has a 3.4 cm high ornament on its lower part. The support is screwed onto the brass cylinder and has inscribed into the front the motto Onoare și Patrie ("Honour and Fatherland"). The name of the respective unit is engraved into the reverse.

Other features of the military colours are a tie for attaching decorations, six sashes for the armed escort of the colour guard and the colour ensign and a protective cover of impermeable fabric.

The military colours of navy vessels are identical to their ensign. The ensign is in turn identical to the national flag, being made of ordinary canvas in various dimensions, according to the ship's rank, size and place of hoisting. They are flown in their vessels in accordance with relevant regulations.

==== Russia and Soviet Union ====
Until Peter the Great assumed the office and throne of Tsar in 1685, various flag designs were used by land and naval units of Imperial Russia.

In the 18th century the Imperial Russian Army started to have colours of its own. Starting from the 1730s, Cross style flags in the colours of the various military units appeared in various units: large flags for the infantry and the other arms and small flags for the cavalry and horse artillery. These flags mirrored the Commonwealth military colours of today, with one colour set as the state colour and the rest as the regimental and battalion or squadron colours. Year 1797 regulations introduced new designs for the infantry—for regular units, the state colour being white with the state emblem and the company, battalion and/or regimental colours using the assigned colours of their units, for the Imperial Guard a different emblem was used, and the design was identical. New colours were issued in 1800, but only Guards units used them.

Regulations set in 1813 unified infantry unit colours into one. Guards units used the orange and black of the Order of Saint George with the facing colours and unit emblem at the centre.

All these years, the cavalry colours were different.

Naval flags, until 1861–62 (with a brief break in the late 1790s) whilst using the St. Andrew's cross in blue on white, mirrored the British Royal Navy.

Russian Armed Forces (top); Russian Army (middle); Russian Aerospace Force (bottom).

From 1942 onwards, each regiment in the armed forces of the Soviet Union (especially the Army and Air Force) had its own colour, which was produced to a standard design:

- Obverse: red field, a red star yellow bordered and the full name and number of a military unit/school below. Each unit has its own inscription.
- Reverse: red field, a gold hammer and sickle and the motto "For our Soviet Motherland!" (За нашу советскую родину!, Za nashu sovyetskuyu rodinu)

The colour was gold fringed.

The former designs had a red star on the reverse with the name of the Central Executive Committee and later, the Supreme Soviet of the USSR surrounding it, and the obverse had the unit inscription below the coat of arms of the Soviet Union, which had the Soviet Union state motto ("Workers of the world, unite!") and the red star with the hammer and sickle inside (both were on the flag of the Soviet Union) above it (the latter was near the hoist). Naval flags until 1935 sported different designs. (Distinguished units would be given a second colour, the Revolutionary Red Banner of Honour, by the all-Union CEC (before 1924 by the All-Russian Central Executive Committee).)

The Soviet Navy colours had the 1935 official design with them (it was later revised in 1950), with additions for units honoured with the Order of the Red Banner, but in 1964 the Supreme Commander's and Defence Minister's own naval colour and the colours of the Navy Commander-in-Chief (formerly the Minister for the Navy) and Chief of Naval Operations were issued with different designs used, with the addition of the Armed Forces General Staff's own naval colour. The first colour was red with the USSR state arms, the next two had the arms with blue stripes indicating office rank, and the final two were adaptations of the naval ensign (with a different ensign with the rank) plus the stripes. The 1935 design (that of a white field with a blue lower stripe and the red star plus the hammer and sickle above the blue stripe) replaced a much earlier, post-revolutionary naval colours design adopted in 1925. In 1944 a different flag was issued to the Navy for its land based units – the same design used by the Army with a different obverse having the unit name below the naval ensign.

Early flags even had the RKKA and RKKF insignia (the Army General Staff, represented by crossed blue rifles and later became the General Staff's naval colour until 1964, the Naval General Staff and the Army Naval Operations Staff, later the flag of the People's Comissariat for the Navy on its 1938 creation and was issued with two new colours for the Navy Commissar and Deputy Commissar) beside the hammer and sickle, even the flags of the People's Commissar for National Defence and that of the Navy General Staff and the various flags of naval officers which had the ensign on a canton surrounded by a red field, derived from the Navy Commissar's. The cruiser Aurora since 1968 has had a different version of the ensign, flanked by the Order of the Red Banner and of the Order of the October Revolution on the top sides of the star, as the Aurora was the only naval recipient of the latter order in 1967 while in 1918, the Order of the Red Banner was conferred to the ship.

===== Regimental colours of the Guards units =====
The colours of those regiments that were classed as "Guards" was slightly different as per 1942 regulations. These had the portrait of Lenin, the Za nashu motto and the abbreviation "USSR" (СССР, SSSR) on the obverse and the small star with hammer and sickle in its centre, unit's name and a motto on the reverse of the colour. The mottoes were different for every regiment (for example, those regiments made Guards in the Great Patriotic War bore the motto "Death to the German invaders", Смерть Немецким захватчикам, Smyert' Nyemyetskim zahvatchikam). In some Guards Armies and Corps, different designs on the obverse and reverse were used. Even the Lenin portrait was different in these colours. All of them were gold fringed.

The Navy's Guards units still had the 1935 design, with the addition of the Guards ribbon below, except for units which were honoured with the Order of the Red Banner and became Guard units later. The difference is in the red five-pointed star, in which Red Banner Guard unit flags had applied the Guards ribbon below aside from the Order of the Red Banner on the star for units that had the order bestowed on their colours earlier. Units which used the 1944 regimental colour design but adapted for the navy's guards units included air and marine units which still had the obverse of Army and Air Force guards units standards.

===== Colours of the present-day Russian Armed Forces =====
Since the birth of the Armed Forces of the Russian Federation in the aftermath of the dissolution of the Soviet Union, the old Soviet unit colours were retained. Starting in 1998, the traditional Imperial Russian Armed Forces flag designs were reinstated; however, the new designs began to appear in the early years of the 21st century in the Army and Air Force. But the Russian Navy's old naval colour (St. Andrew's cross in blue on a white field) began to be used again in 1992. It has several variations, and the old jack colour of the Soviet Navy (pre-1935) soon became its jack colour, with the red star with the hammer and sickle removed. The unit colours (especially those of the Navy honour guards) have the same design with the unit insignia at the centre of it while Guards units and bemerited and decorated units apply a different version of the colour.

The new Army and Air Force unit colours are square shaped, have a St. Andrew's cross in the colours of the Ribbon of Saint George, and with the unit insignia in the middle of the obverse and the national arms at the reverse, with the service branch emblem on the corners. These colours are the basis for similar ones used today in the various Russian uniformed services.

==== Spain ====
Standard Spanish Army Colour

- Standard colours: Units of the Spanish Armed Forces have a single colour based on the national flag. This has the coat of arms in the centre of the flag, surrounded by the regiment's name in black lettering. It is fringed in gold. Red and yellow tassels are attached to the finial which have the battle honours embroidered on them. The flag is in gold fringe. Formerly a white regimental colour known as the sencilla with a red Cross of Burgundy with unit insignia on each of the ends of was used by these units until the adoption of the present colours in 1843. Large colours are the standard of infantry formations, small standards for the cavalry and artillery.
- Coronelas: Up until the early 20th century, some Spanish regiments had a coronela, or King's Colour in addition to their Regimental Colour based on the national flag. Although officially the only colour is the standard one, some older regiments continue to carry a copy of their old coronela which are used on some occasions to maintain regimental traditions. However, the coronelas no longer have any official standing and are not used on official occasions. The design of such colours are white with the royal arms at the centre and the unit insignia and honours at the sides. These had no gold fringe.
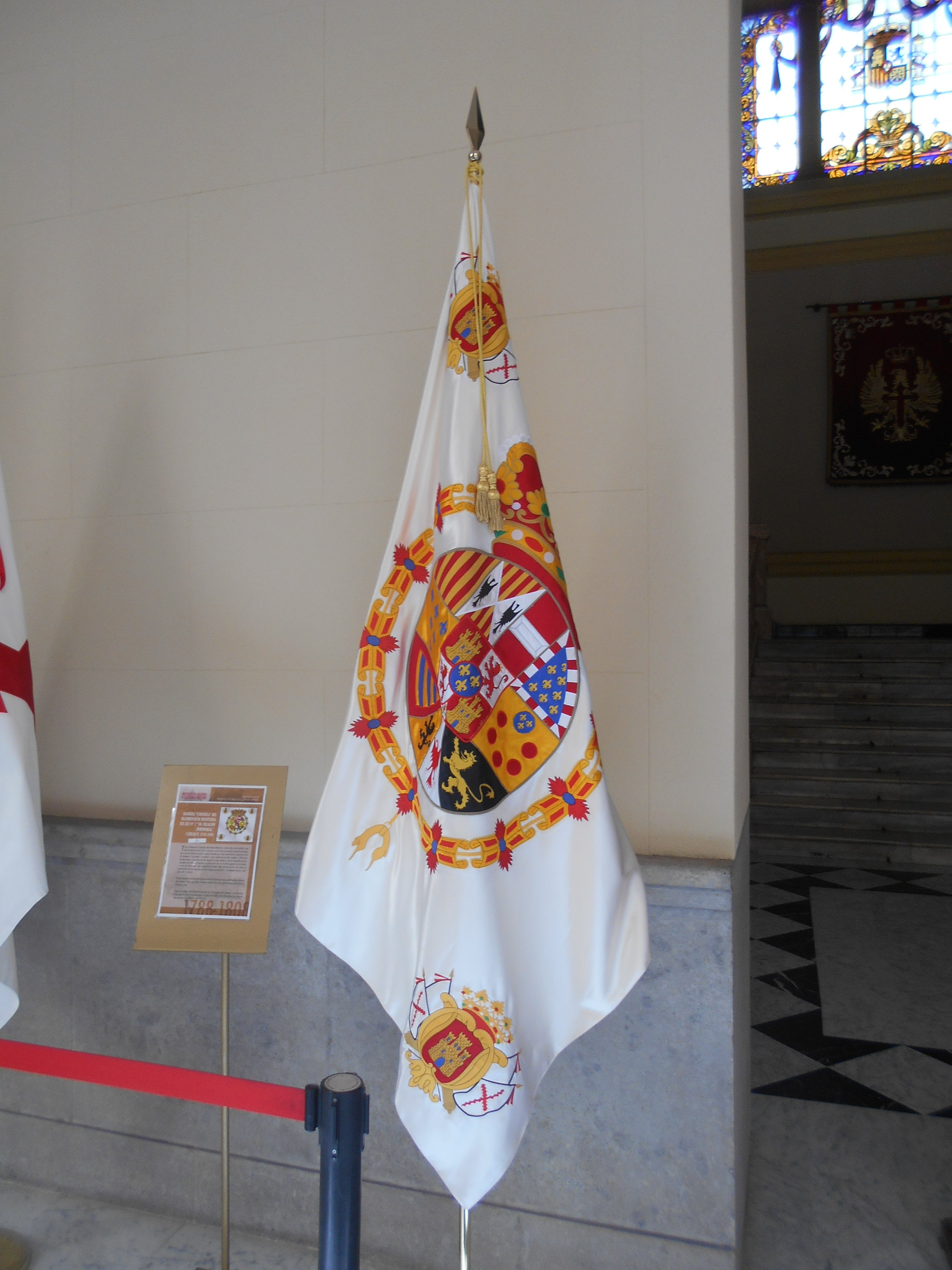
Recreated Coronela of the 1st Infantry Regiment from 1788 to 1808.
- Second order colours – regimental/wing guidons and banners: In Spain's Armed Forces, guidons and banners are second order colours, but are smaller (guidons are medium square shaped while banners are small square shaped). Guidons are used by battalions, squadrons and groups (even vessels) in the Armed Forces while the banners are used by companies, troops, flights and batteries. All have different and unique designs with some having the old Burgundy cross on them. These also have the unit insignia in the centre. Like the Regimental Colour, the finials of these colours have the attached unit battle honours and decorations.

==== Sweden ====
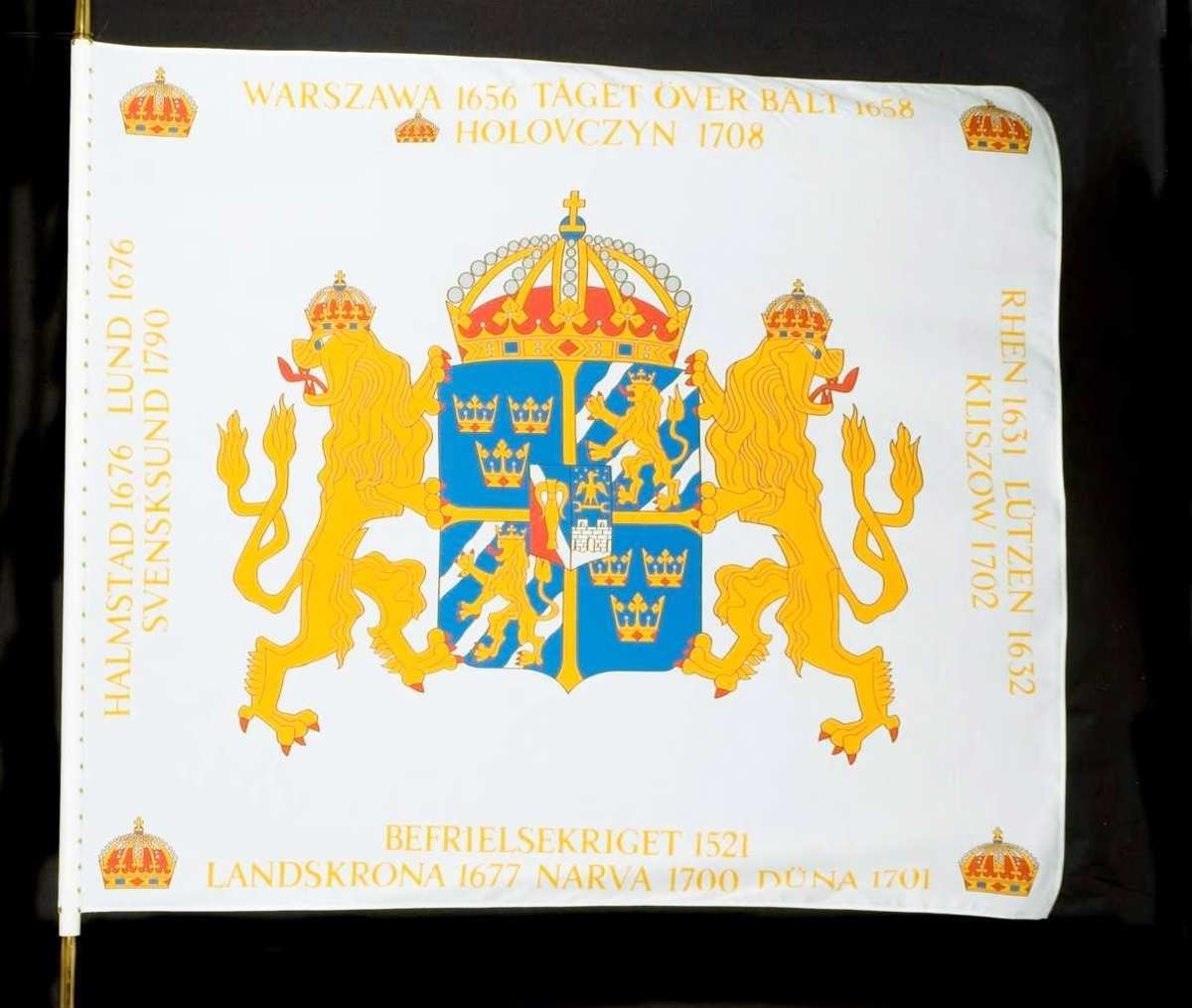
Guards colour of the Svea Life Guards (I 1).

The design of the colours of the Swedish Armed Forces of today dates back to several separate regulations from early 19th century up to the first united regulations of the three fighting services in 1972. The majority of the army colours are dated back to the summarized regulations of 1950. The colours of the Swedish Amphibious Corps (former Swedish Coastal Artillery) were decided in model 1944. The colours of the Swedish Air Force were modelled in 1938. Most older colours are embroidered by hand while younger ones can be both machine and handmade. When a military unit, as regards traditions, is amalgamated with another, both colours will be carried together. In principle this will go on as long as both colours are usable. When one of the two (or more) no longer can be repaired, the unit will be granted a new colour. This new colour will reflect the traditions of both units without altering the prescribed model.

Exceptions from this rule are:

- The Life Guards (LG) which maintains its privilege to present both the colour of the former Svea Life Guards (I 1) and the standard of the former Life Guard Dragoons (K 1)
- The South Scanian Regiment (P 7) which maintains its privilege to present both the colour of the South Scanian Regiment (P 7) and the standard of the former Scanian Dragoon Brigade (Skånska dragonbrigaden, MekB 8)
- The Artillery Regiment (A 9) which maintains its privilege to present both the standard of the Artillery Regiment (A 9) and the honorary standard of the former Wendes Artillery Regiment (A 3)
- The Uppland Regiment (S 1) which maintains its privilege to present both the colour of the former Royal Signal Regiment (S 1) and the colour of the former Royal Uppland Regiment (I 8)

A colour is normally granted to the following by the King, by the Prime Minister or the Commander of the Armed Forces:

- an army unit belonging to the Infantry Branch, the Armoured Troops, the Engineer Troops, the Signal Troops and the Service Troops
- the regiments of the Amphibious Corps
- the wings of the Swedish Air Force

==== Turkey ====
The Flag of Turkey is used by the Turkish Armed Forces as a National Colour, and thus has distinguishing features:

Flag of Turkish Army 39th Mechanized Infantry Brigade

- the golden TC (Turkish monogram for Republic of Turkey) on the top left corner, surrounded by golden rays
- the regimental name, abbreviated, below the crescent and star in white
- gold fringe surrounding the colour, cords and tassles

It is presented and uncased with a ceremony and moves under the command of the Colour Guard. This unit consists of 4 personnel: the ensign holding the flag, two armed colour guards and the Colour Officer. There are selection criteria for the colour guard. The ensign, flag guard and colour officer must be distinguished among their peers with their education and discipline. The colour officer must be ranking as a subaltern officer.

The General Directorate of Security of the Ministry of the Interior has two Colours, only in the offices of the General Director of Security and the Superintendent of the Police Academy. It has defined the colours as the symbols of honor of the Police in its own regulations. These have a white tassel, cords and fringe unlike the colours used in the Turkish Armed Forces.

All colours salute only the President and foreign Heads of State. As long as the colour is uncased and visible especially in military events, it is saluted by everyone standing and with a frontal salute.

Back Side of Standard of Ottoman Infantry Regiment

The Ottoman army often used verses from the Quran and Shahada (There is no god but God alone, and Muhammad is his messenger) on their colours, which were usually in scarlet. This tradition continued during the First World War. When Ottoman Turkey joined the war on the side of the Central Powers in 1914, it declared a jihad against the Entente States. The modern Ottoman Turkish army used the Ottoman state coat of arms on one side of their standard regimental flags/standards and the Shahada on the other side in gold lettering. Gold fringe was introduced as well to match those of other national armies. After the empire was abolished in 1922, this practice continued for a while in modern Turkey with the national republican arms replacing the Ottoman.

Flags of the Ottoman/Turkish Army
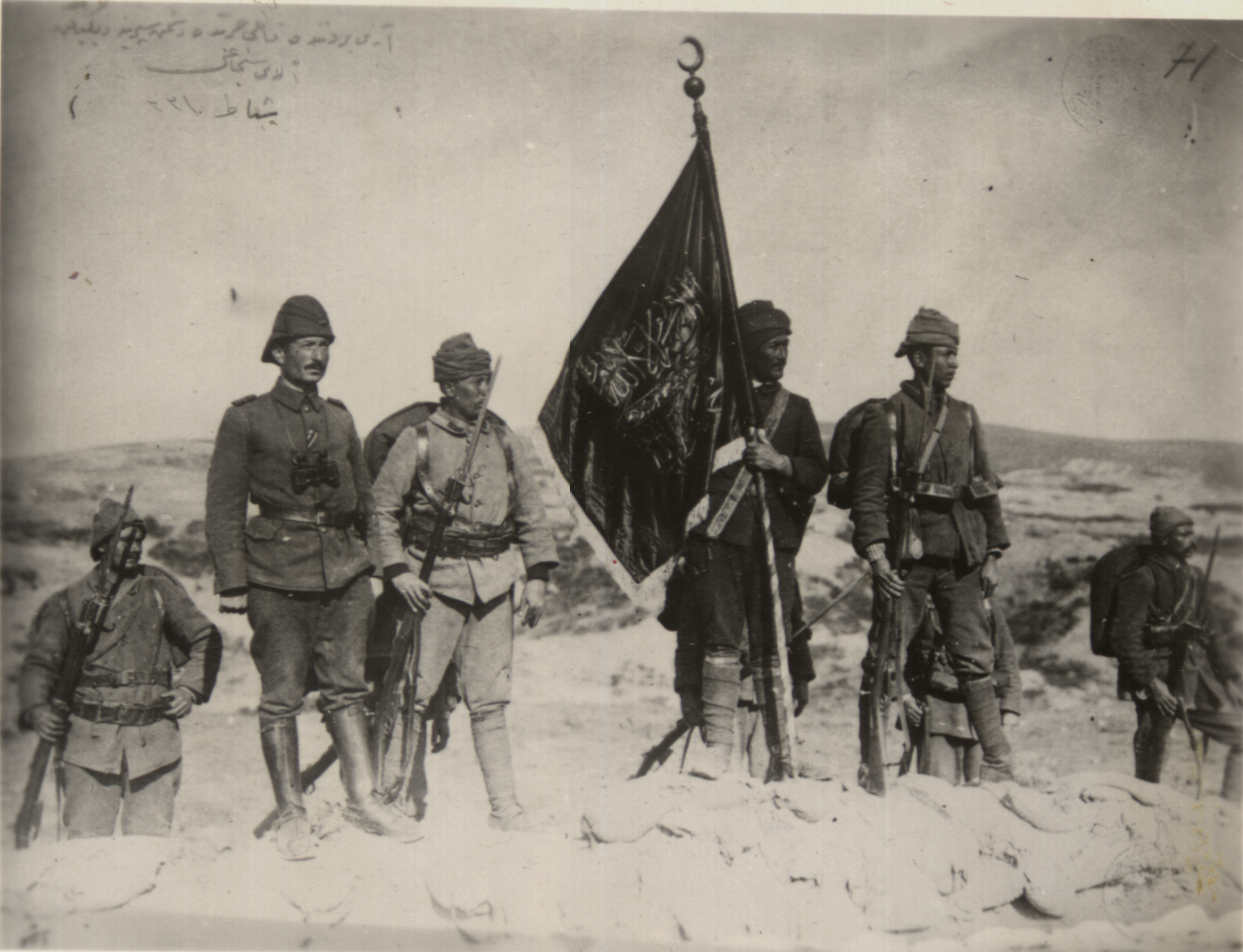
Ottoman Turkish Regimental Standard at Gallipoli,1915

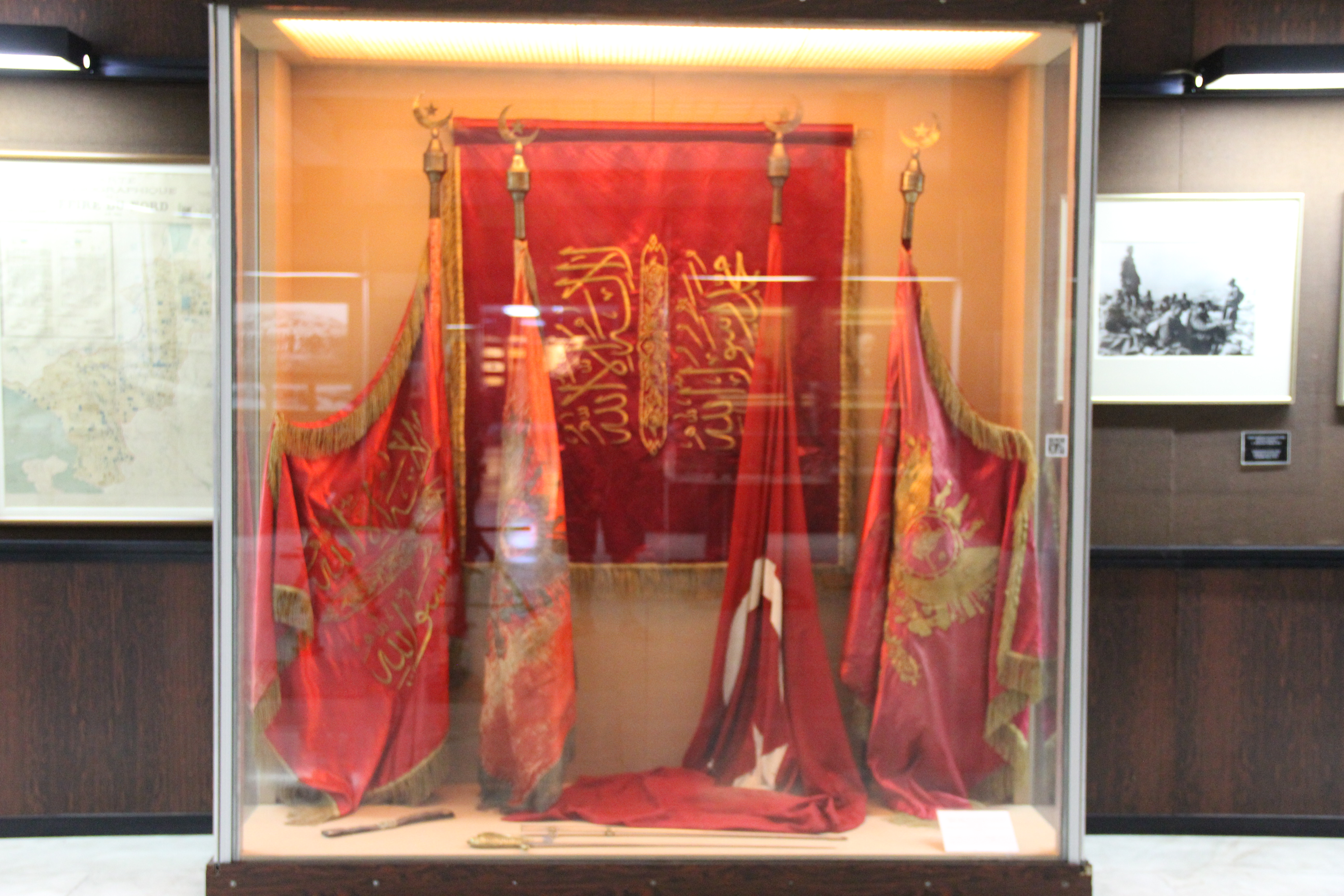
Ottoman Turkish Regimental Standards with Ottoman Turkish National Flag

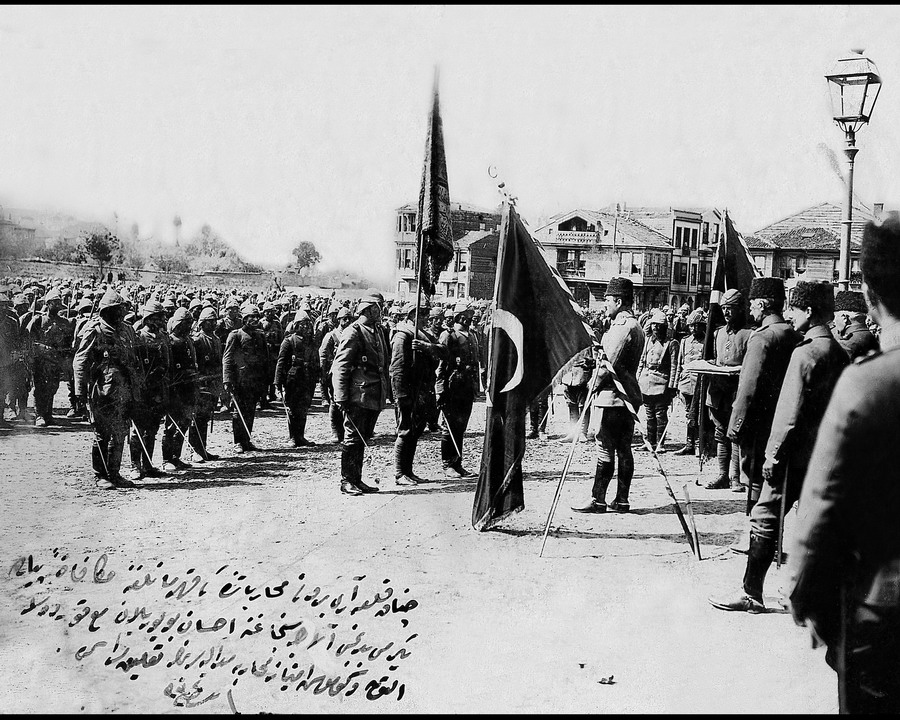
Ceremony to decorate the standard of the 27th Regiment with silver and gold Imtiyaz medals

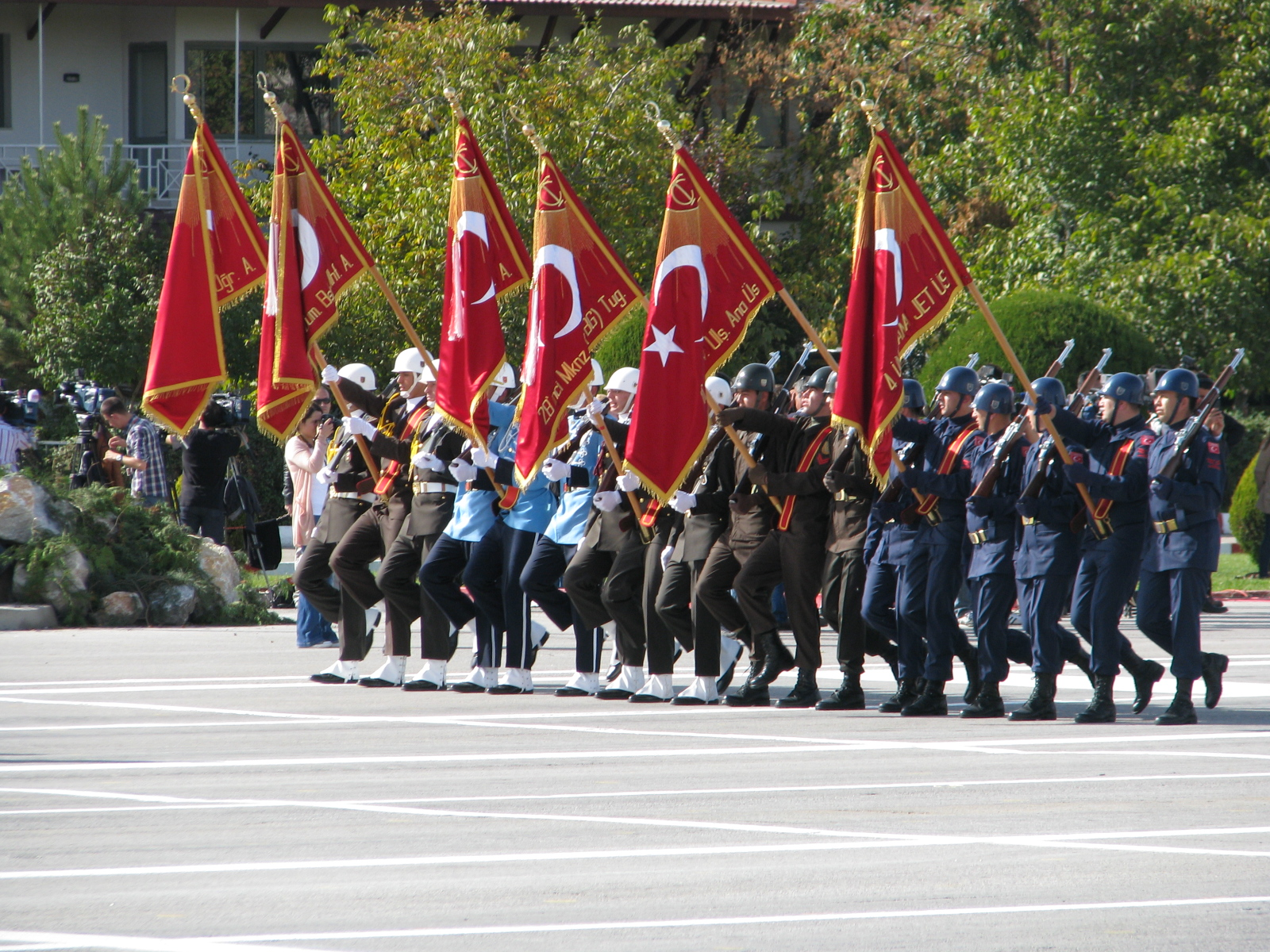
Standards of the Turkish Army at Military Parade

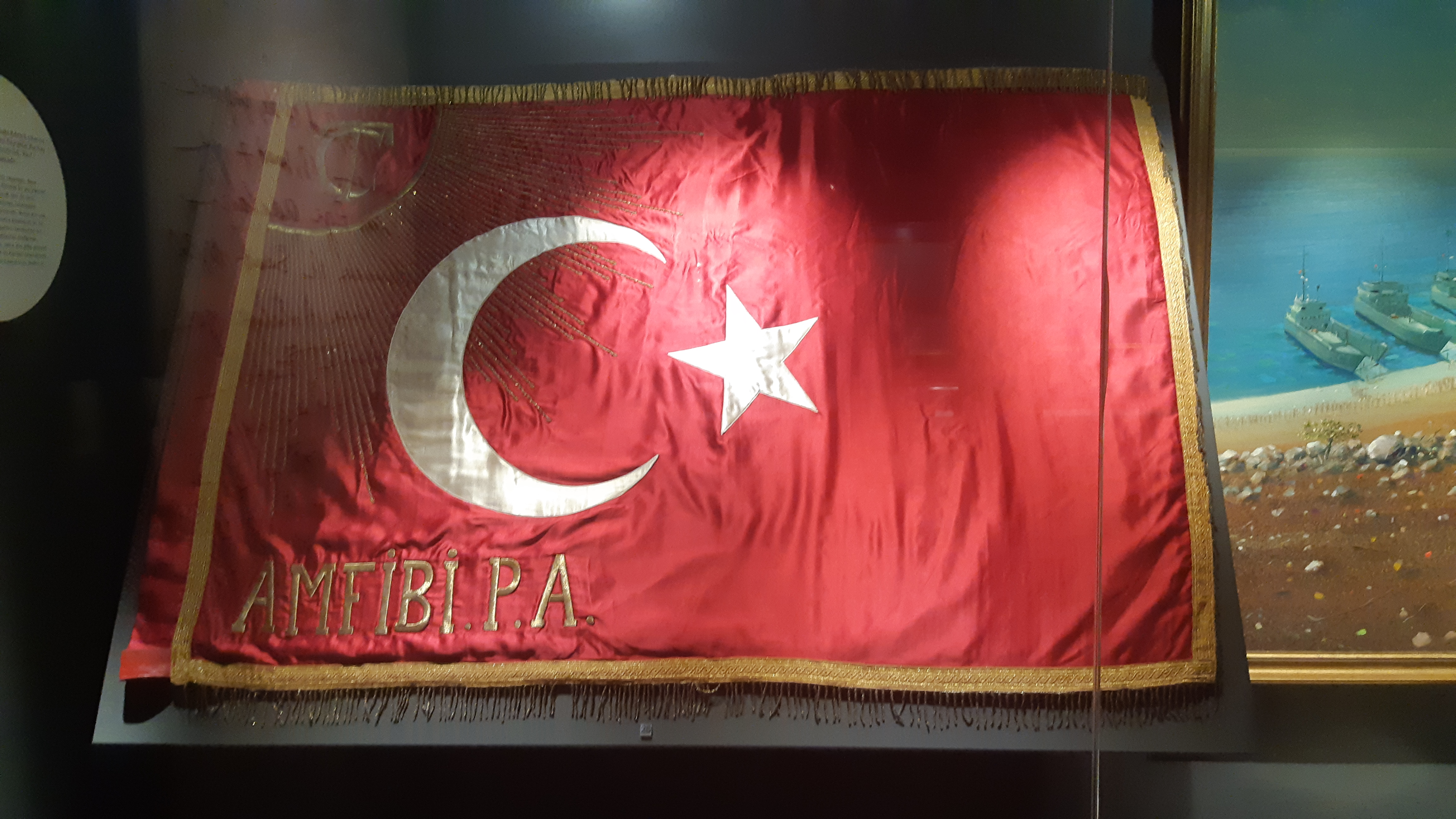
Turkish Army Marine Brigade Standard

==== Ukraine ====
Flag of Galicia-Volhynia

At the turn of the 13th and 14th centuries, quadrangular flags with wedge panels on the free end appeared. The most used colors were red, followed by white, blue, and occasionally yellow. The most widely used flag images were crosses, holy and princely symbols and ancestral tridents-bidents. The flag of the Galicia-Volynia principality was blue with a golden lion.

In 1410, Ruthenian troops took part in the Battle of Grunwald on the side of the Kingdom of Poland and the Grand Duchy of Lithuania against their old ally from the time of the Principality of Galicia-Volhynia, the Teutonic Order. The Polish chronicler Jan Dlugosz left a description of the banners of the troops from the ruthenian lands who appeared to fight the crusaders.

The Zaporozhian Army received their first flags from foreign monarchs from the 16th century: during the Moldavian campaigns of the Austro-Turkish war and the campaign of the Holy League.

Flag of the Zaporozhian sich

In 1646, for the campaign against the Turks, Wladyslav IV Vasa provided a flag: ironically, it was under this banner that the Cossacks won their first resounding victories over the Polish army during the Khmelnytskyj uprising — at Yellow Waters, Korsun, and Pyliavtsi.

According to the system, there were regimental, sotnia and kish banners. Among the flags of the day, rectangular and trapezoidal panels prevailed. The insignia of numerous units had a triangular shape of various shades of red. Instead of a single state flag, the highest heraldic symbol of the Hetmanate was the image of the Archangel Michael on a red background. Most of the flags that have survived to our time contain an equilateral Cossack cross and eight-pointed stars, sometimes combined with images of the crescent moon, a symbol of the Christian-Muslim civilizational confrontation, the latter, from 1572 (in honor of Lepanto), had a pan-European distribution as a symbol of victory in the confrontation with the Islamic threat. From the 18th century, primarily in the Poltava (1717) and Lubny (1758) regiments, two-color flags of yellow and blue became widespread.

In general, until the second half of the 18th century. there are relatively fragmentary data available, more detailed information from the time of the unification of flags during the time of Kyril Razumovsky: on March 8/18, 1755, he issued a form for the manufacture of flags according to a single model according to the project of Colonel Ivan Kulyabka of Lubny — one side was to contain the Coat of Arms of the Nation, and the other symbol of a military unit. Despite this, the colors and sizes of the flags were arbitrary. Similar standards existed until 1768 - the reign of Peter Rumyantsev, who began to introduce imperial symbols in the Cossack army.

Flag of the Cossack Hetmanate (17th-18th century)

The unification of the banners of the Hetmanate did not in any way affect the ensign of the Zaporozhian Army, the general banner — the Great Banner — still contained Archangel Michael on a red background, the flags of the kurin and palanquins were mostly crimson in color. The banner of sea campaigns with the image of St. Nicholas was white, besides it, after the Oleshkivsk sich period, there was also a titular red banner of imperial origin. Among the kurin banners, the red ones with the image of St. George.

The first Cossack colonizers of the Sloboda region formed the Slobid regiments, the banner of which also featured Christian and religious themes. In total, there were 36 flags in the five regiments, together with the sotnias. The reverse side of the sotnia flags contained the name of the regiment and the sotnia. In contrast to the banners of the rest of the Ukrainian Cossacks, the Slobid banners contained the image of the Mother of God, the patroness of the Cossacks, as the main motif. With the reorganization into regular hussars, the previous symbols of the units were abolished.

In 1792, the Zaporozhians were moved to the Kuban, where the Tmutarakan Principality was located, forming the Black Sea Cossack Army.

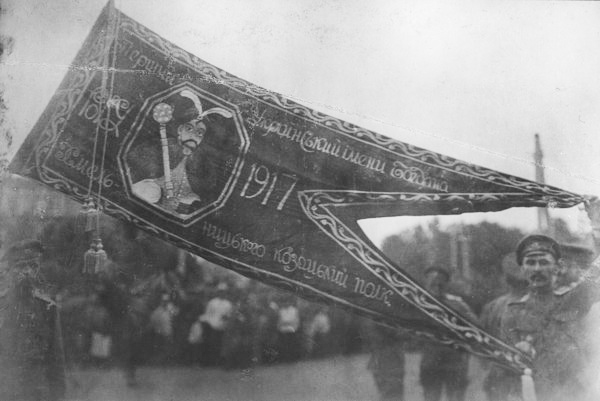

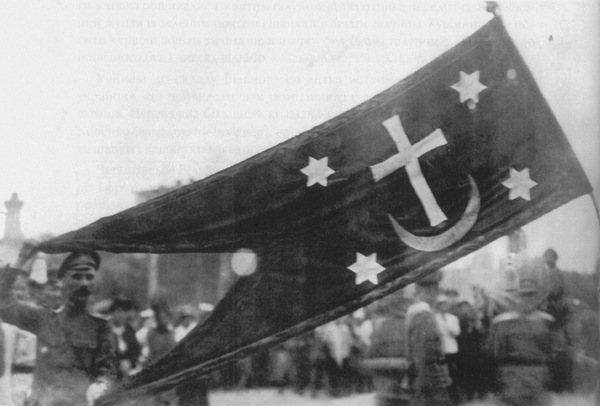
Flag of the Bohdan Khmelnytsky 1st Ukrainian Regiment, 1917

Following the collapse of the Russian Empire, the Tsentralna Rada came to power in Ukraine in spring of 1917, it was forced to promptly put together an army to defend the new republic against their enemies. Nearly all units of the newly created army were detached from the Imperial Russian Army. After the first all-Ukrainian military congress that took place on May 18–21, 1917 in Kyiv, the Ukrainian General Military Committee was created. The committee was placed in charge for creation and restructuring of the army.

The next congress, defying a ban placed by the Russian Provisional Government, took place on June 18–23, 1917 in Kyiv. The main requests of the congress were proclamation of the Ukrainian Democratic Republic, full Ukrainization of army and navy, and an immediate peace treaty.

On January 27, 1918, the Ukrainian Central Rada approved the project of the Ukrainian naval ensign, developed by the Ukrainian Maritime Council (it consisted of two stripes: blue at the top, yellow at the bottom; on the top - the golden sign of Prince Volodymyr - the Trident with a cross at the top), modeled after the British White Ensign.

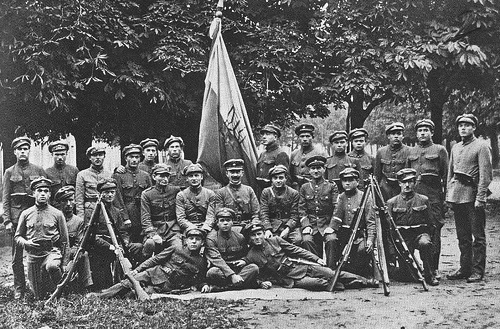
Ukrainian Galician Army posing with a blue-yellow flag

In 1919, blue-yellow unit colours based on the national flag were adopted for units of both the regular Army of the Ukrainian People's Republic and the Ukrainian Galician Army.

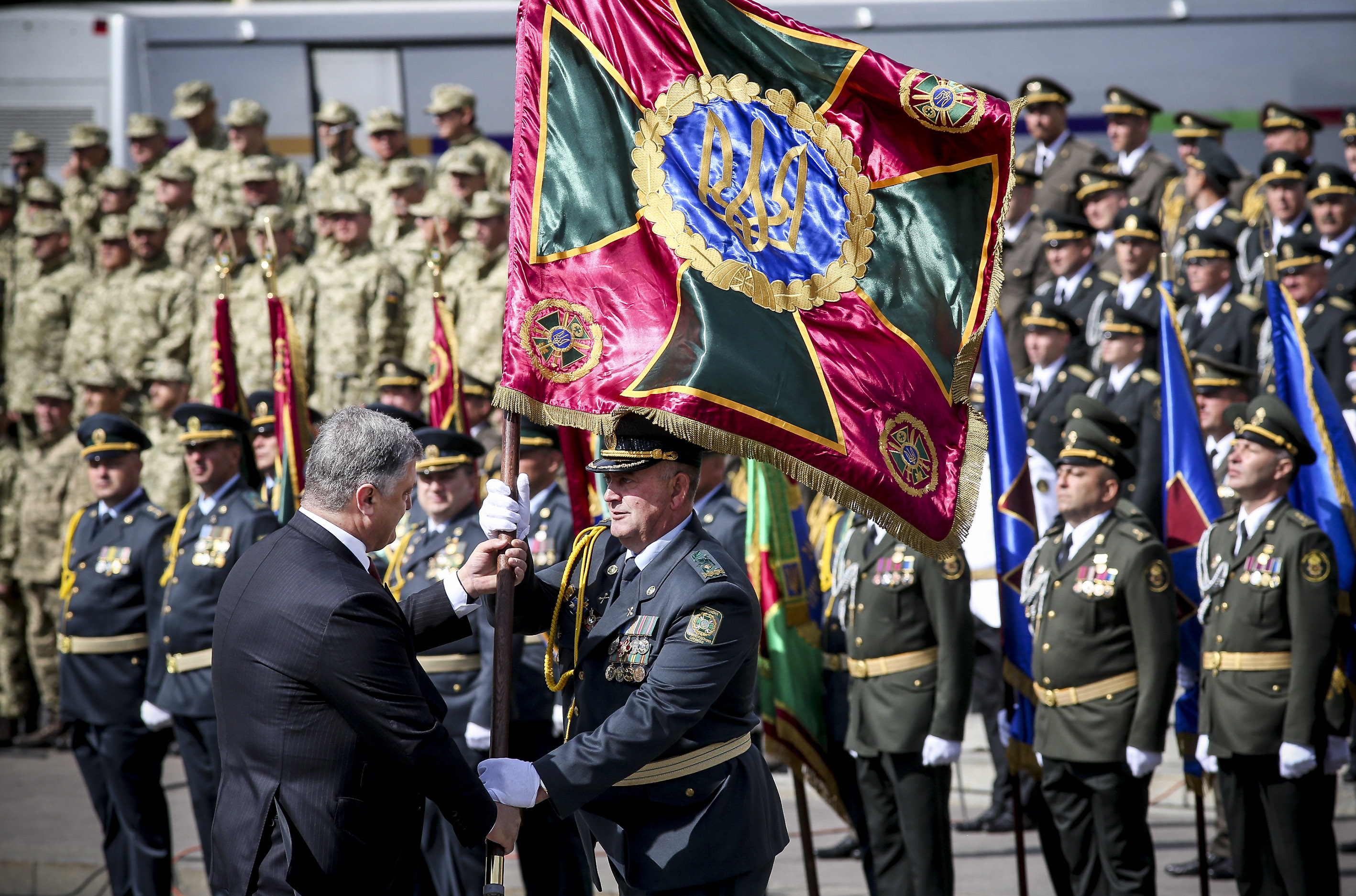
President Petro Poroshenko presents the colour to the State Border Guard Service of Ukraine at the 2017 Independence Day Parade, Kyiv

With restored independence the Armed Forces of Ukraine adopted a maroon design for its colours, which were gold fringed and contained the official heraldic arms of the armed forces.

Maroon and gold are the colours used in the current military colours used in the Armed Forces of Ukraine, with origins in the Imperial Russian Army's Cossacks and Ukrainian units. In the obverse the Coat of arms of Ukraine, surrounded by a gold wreath, is at the centre of an Orthodox Cross – both symbols form the emblem of the Armed Forces – with a St. Andrew's Cross under it with the same emblem in the sides, with the Armed Forces Motto (For Ukraine, for Its will) surrounding the emblem and crosses. The unit's name is in the reverse. The colour is gold fringed and is mounted on a pole with a trident finial modeled on the national arms. The same design is used in the National Guard of Ukraine but in blue and with the 2015 grenade badge. Active duty NG units sport dark blue colours with the Orthodox Cross, grenade and the coat of arms at the corners.

Only the 93rd Mechanized Brigade (Ground Forces), the Ukrainian Air Assault Forces and the Ukrainian Marine Corps have been granted additional colours so far in addition to the official maroon unit colours.

The State Border Guard Service of Ukraine shares a similar colour design to the Armed Forces but with the green colour added to distinguish its units.

==== Yugoslavia and post-Yugoslav nations ====
The first Yugoslav military colours came about when the Kingdom of Yugoslavia was established in 1918. These were the square versions of the Flag of the Kingdom of Yugoslavia with the state coat of arms and the motto of the Yugoslav Royal Army. The unit names were attached to a ribbon at the pole. The colours were inspired by the military colours of Serbia and of the Croat, Slovene and Bosnian military units of resistance against Austria-Hungary during the First World War.

With the birth of the communist Partisans in 1941 in time for the Second World War, their flags showed the same Pan-Slavic colours on them (arranged according to nationality) but this time a red star was added in the middle. The naval units had a different ensign used and these flags became the basis for the military colours of Democratic Federal Yugoslavia at the time of its 1943 proclamation.

By the time, these flags had the unit name on the pole pennants and were gold fringed. The Partisan General Staff had their own version of it.

Post-war colours (from 1947, when the nation became a Federal People's Republic) used various flag design with the Yugoslav People's Army motto in Serbo-Croatian (For the freedom and independence of the socialist fatherland) both in Cyrillic and Latin and differed per unit or service arm of the YPA, but was longer and were gold fringed. Just as before, the unit name stayed on the attached ribbon. Both the Flag of Yugoslavia and the flag of the League of Communists of Yugoslavia were used as National Colours in parades. Unique colours were issued to the Navy, to YPA reserve units and the Territorial Defence Forces of the republics.

Today all the nations of the former Yugoslavia have separate colour traditions per armed forces, but keep their unique appearance.

===== Serbia =====
The Serbian Armed Forces colour design is very much unique, while gold fringe can be seen in these colours. At the obverse is the national flag design, a tricolour with the national coat of arms in the center of the colour, while the emblem and facing colour of the unit represented (combat formation or support unit) is in the reverse.

===== Croatia =====
Since independence, Croatia adopted a more Western style of colours for its armed forces with the Flag of Croatia as the National Colour. All are not gold fringed and their longer length suggests American and British influence in the design and traditions.

=== North America ===
==== Cuba ====
Cuba's military colours under the Cuban Revolutionary Armed Forces tend to follow a mix of the Soviet and US practice, as the Cuban flag is treated as a National Colour. All have gold fringe.

- Regiments/Wings: bicolour vertical flag with a white field in the centre with the Coat of arms of Cuba and the service or branch colour at the sides
- Infantry Divisions of the Revolutionary Army, Territorial Troops Militias, Youth Labour Army and Camilio Cienfuegos Military Schools System: Red with coat of arms with title on gold or white surrounding
- Armoured Divisions: Black with coat of arms with title on white
- Air Force Brigades: Blue with coat of arms with title on white surrounding
- Antonio Maceo Military College and Jose Maceo Military College: Red and Black with coat of arms
- Naval Academy: White with two blue stripes

==== El Salvador ====
El Salvador's military colours under the Salvadoran Armed Forces heavily follow US models, as the Salvadoran flag, with gold fringe, is treated as a National Colour- but its design is based on the American Civil War example and Argentine and Mexican precedence: the name of the unit is on the bottom blue stripe of the colour in gold lettering.

==== Honduras ====
Honduran military colours under the Honduran Armed Forces heavily follow US models, as the Honduran flag is treated as a National Colour.

==== Mexico ====
The Mexican Armed Forces use the Flag of Mexico as the National Colour, with the unit inscription below the Coat of arms of Mexico and the official name of the country (Estados Unidos Mexicanos, "United Mexican States") above it. It is the standard design for infantry units and other general services. The same design is used as the National Standard of all Mexican Army cavalry and artillery units as well as artillery units of the Mexican Naval Infantry (under the Navy). Colours and standards are both gold fringed, and the lettering is also in gold.

As a uniformed federal force, the National Guard's units are entitled to a National Colour or Standard.

Mexican Navy units and the Heroic Military Academy are the only ones entitled to regimental colours. Navy schools carry a white gold fringed colour with the heraldic emblem of the school.

==== Nicaragua ====
Nicaragua's military colours under the Nicaraguan Armed Forces are heavily following US practice, as the Nicaraguan flag is treated as a National Colour. The unit colours are in red, with a gold outline of Nicaragua with the service, unit or branch insignia in the centre.

==== United States ====
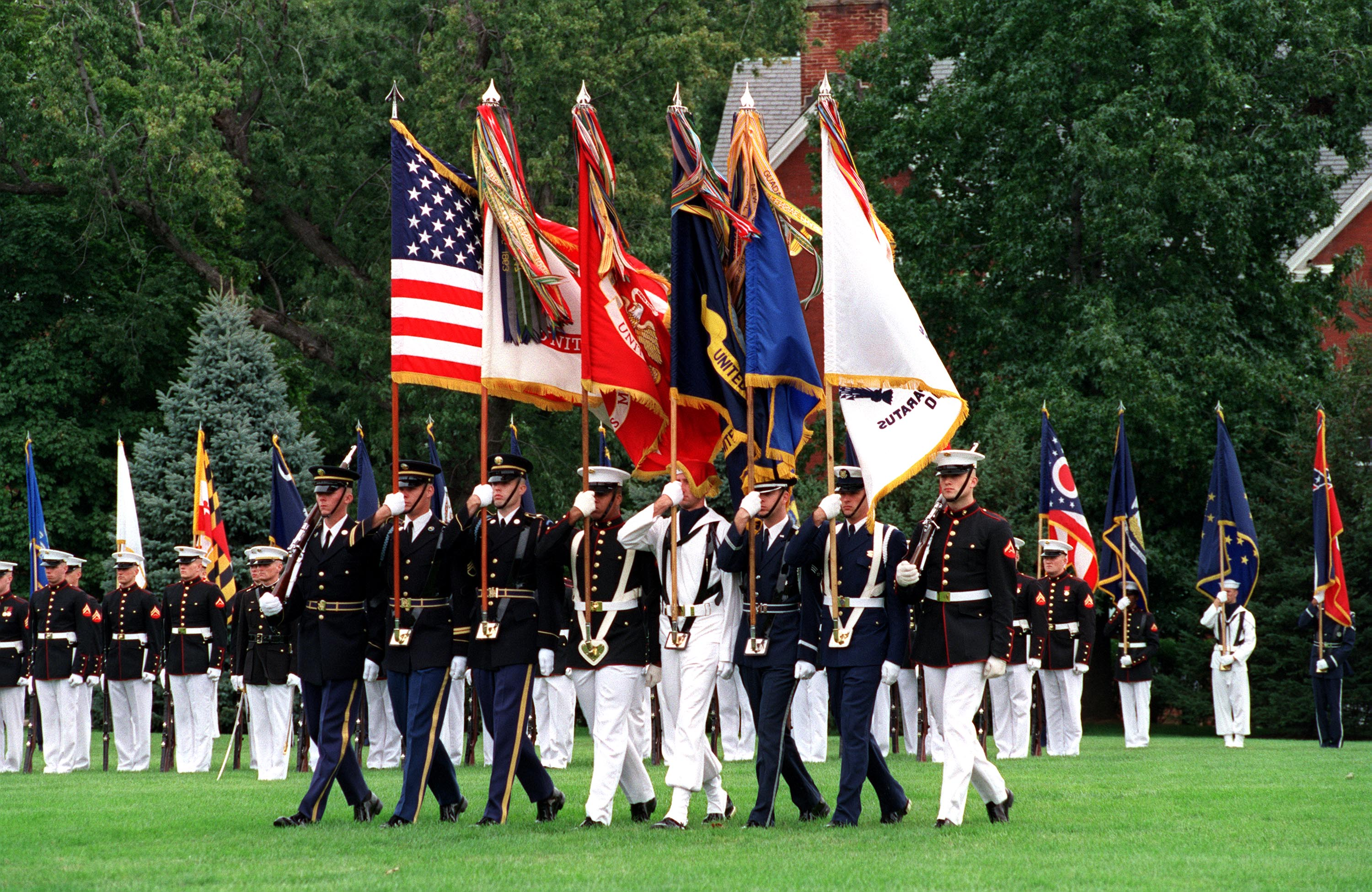
Joint colour guard showing the organizational colours of each branch (L-R): National, Army, Marine Corps, Navy, Air Force, and Coast Guard.

In the United States military, each branch has its own flag, an organizational colour, sometimes also called a ceremonial flag. Each of these is 4 ft 4 in (132 cm) × 5 ft 6 in (168 cm), some using 2 1/2 in (6.4 cm) gold fringe during specific instances. The ceremonial flag is paraded with a National Color of equal dimensions in a colour guard, with gold fringe as necessary. The National Color is never dipped in salute, but remains vertical at all times, while the organizational colours and any guidons are dipped as necessary. When the National Color is not cased, all persons salute the Colors. The finial is a nickel or chrome-plated spearhead, though the Navy uses different finials on occasion.

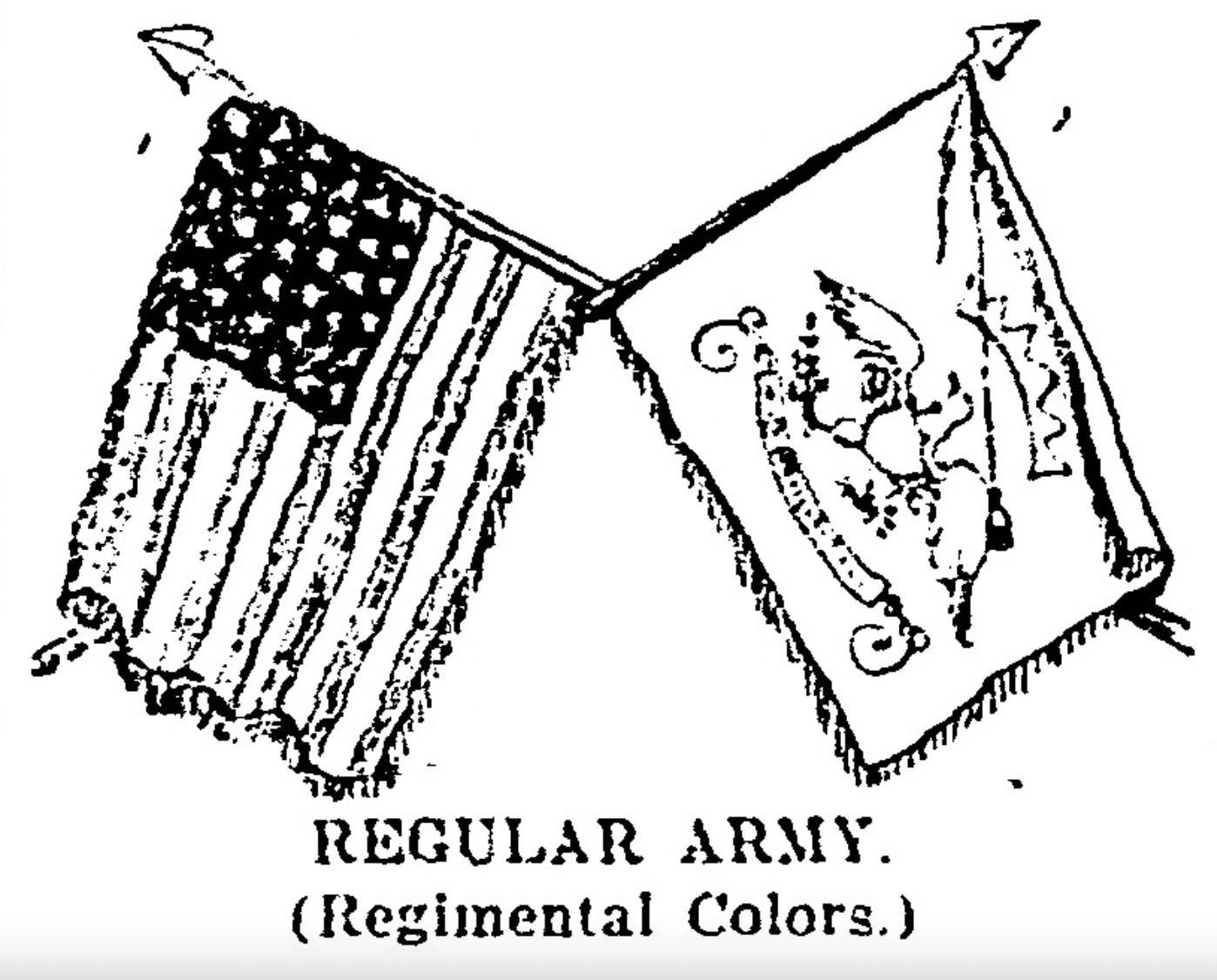
Regimental Colors from 1898

Each service attaches campaign/battle streamers, sometimes known as battle honours, for actions in which the service as a whole has taken part. These can either be war service streamers, which are in the colours of the appropriate campaign medal and have the name of the campaign embroidered; or unit citation streamers, which have the name of the action embroidered and signify that the unit's performance in a specific action has been worthy of special mention. Units are also permitted to wear streamers of overseas awards they may have been presented with. These streamers are in the colours of the appropriate medal ribbon. The streamers are 3 ft (91 cm) × 2 3/4 in (7.0 cm). The Army, for instance, currently has 178 service streamers, embroidering the name of each battle on each, as does the Air Force. The Marine Corps and Navy instead embroider award devices onto streamers to consolidate them, having 62 and 34, respectively.

Colors of the Armed Forces of the United States
United States Army

United States Marine Corps

United States Navy

United States Air Force

United States Space Force

United States Coast Guard

===== United States Air Force =====
U.S. Air Force (USAF) groups and above have the same National Color as the Army; the Organizational Color is ultramarine blue, with the group's coat of arms beneath the USAF crest, which is an eagle on a cloud background. The fringe is in gold. Wing and force colours have their heraldic emblem used instead of the eagle.

This is the same design for Air Force commands and educational institutions but with the eagle replaced by the emblem of the formation.

===== United States Army =====
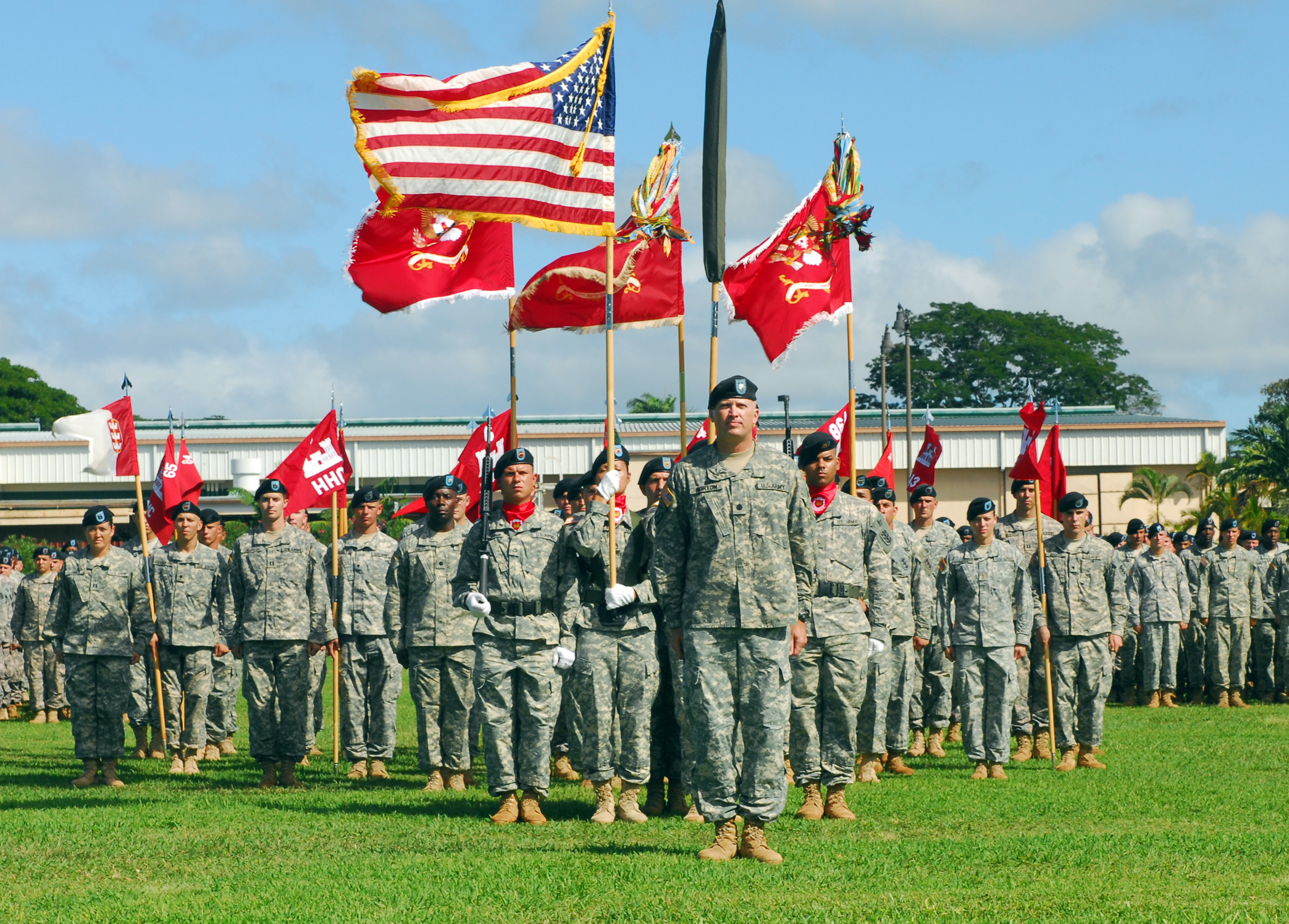
The 130th Engineer Brigade, its subordinate units and their colours.

In the Army, most regiments, battalions of regiments, and separate battalions also have a stand of colours. The first is the National Color, which is a 36 in × 48 in (91 cm × 122 cm) version of the national flag trimmed with a 2 1/2 in-wide (6.4 cm) gold fringe, and is the equivalent of the King's Colour in the British Army. The second is the Organizational Color, which is the equivalent of the regimental colour; this is the same dimensions as the National Color, but is of a single colour representing the branch of the service that the unit is from; each branch also has its own fringe colour, which the Organizational Color is trimmed with. In the centre of the colour, for regiments is the eagle from the Great Seal of the United States, but with the regimental coat of arms in the shield. The eagle has in its beak a scroll bearing the regimental motto, with the crest of the regiment's coat of arms above it and the regiment's name below. Attached to the Organizational Color are the campaign and unit citation streamers awarded to the individual unit – these are equivalent to the battle honours embroidered directly onto the colours of British and Commonwealth units. The Organizational Color was carried in lieu of a National Color until shortly before the American Civil War, when the Stars and Stripes became the National Color. Civil War era units sometimes carried alternative Organizational Colors based on their home state flags or of other designs.

Brigade, division and corps colours, also gold fringed, are in the facing colour of the service branch, for brigades the colour is of a bicolour design. These colours have the command heraldic arms at the centre.

===== United States Marine Corps =====
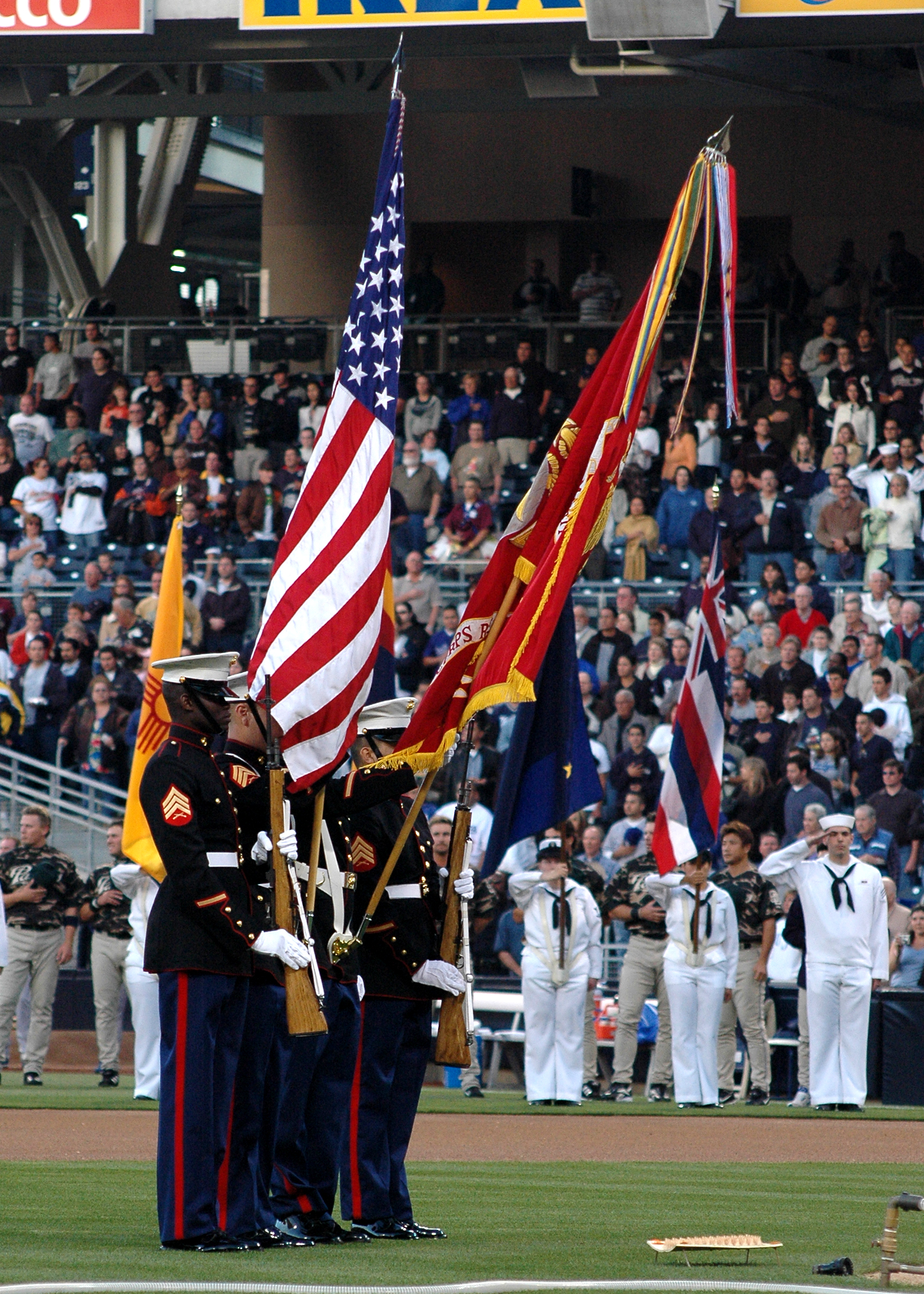
A Marine colour guard dips the Marine flag for "The Star-Spangled Banner".

U.S. Naval Infantry Battalion flag, de facto flag of the United States Navy until 1959

In the Marine Corps, each battalion-sized unit or larger maintains a set of colours. The organizational colour is identical to the Marine Corps battle colour, except that the scroll has the unit's name instead of "United States Marine Corps". It also bears the streamers authorized to the unit, or scarlet and gold tassels if none are authorized.

Fringe is never used on the national colors when carried by Marine Corps unit. Instead, a red, white, and blue tassel can be used to decorate.

===== United States Navy =====
Prior to Executive Order 10812 of 24 April 1959, the United States Navy used the U.S. Naval Infantry Battalion Flag as its unofficial colours. While the Navy uses a number of maritime flags, such as the Ensign and Jack of the United States, the Flag of the United States Navy is normally seen only at ceremonies and parades. The display of streamers and fringe is consistent with that of the Marine Corps.

===== United States Naval Construction Force =====
When Naval Construction Battalions (Seabees) were first formed in 1942 the Naval Infantry Battalion Flag was mandated by Naval Regulation as the colours of the Naval Construction Force. Each battalion-sized unit or larger maintains a set of colours. The organizational colours of each unit is identical, excepting that each will have the unit's name and number in white on the flag. The display of streamers authorized to the unit is consistent with that of the Marine Corps.

===== Other shore establishment units and commands of the Navy =====
Organizational colours of the US Navy's other shore establishment commands and units and all command formations are in navy blue with the arms of the unit or command, with appropriate displayed streamers attached if authorized.

=== South America ===
==== Argentina ====
Each unit of the Argentine Armed Forces, the Argentine National Gendarmerie, the Argentine Federal Police and the Argentine Naval Prefecture bears the national colours on flags, called the National War Flags, which are the national flag with the unit's name embroidered on it in gold lettering. The colours are carried by the unit's most junior officer, escorted by two armed NCOs, except in academies and schools, where it is carried by the top-ranked student of the senior course, and escorted by his or her second- and third-ranked classmates. If a decoration has been awarded to the unit, it is attached to the national colours' cravat. The national colours are never dipped in salute, except to salute another national colours which pass by or are being the subject of a special honour. Besides the national colours, each unit has its unique regimental colours, normally in the arm or service's colour background, with the unit's coat of arms on it. However, not all units have such a common background. For example, the Regiment of Patricians has the Cross of Burgundy as its official regimental colours because of its lineage dating back from 1806. Units which were made part of the Army of the Andes during Argentina's independence war also carry the Flag of the Army of the Andes as a 3rd Colour.

==== Brazil ====
Units of the Brazilian Armed Forces carry a stand of two Colours, differing per service.

The standard of the Brazilian Army measures 80 × 120 cm, white with the Army coat of arms in the centre, trimmed with gold fringe. The name of the service is inscribed in gold letters on a green scroll beneath the shield. Above the shield is a knight's helmet with red and sky blue mantling. The staff is topped by a nickel-plated lance-head finial, 32 cm high. Below the lance-head, there is a cravat (laço militar) divided lengthwise, sky blue and red, with a gold fringe at the end, tied in a bow and fastened with a cockade of blue with the Southern Cross in white stars, red, and blue. Ten red streamers with campaign honours inscribed in sky blue letters are also attached below the lance-head. The staff is 212 cm long, not including the lance-head, and 3.5 cm in diameter. It is covered in sky blue velvet with a red spiral strip. The colour belt is 10 cm in width, covered with sky blue velvet with red velvet stripes. The Brazilian Navy's flag uses dark blue colours; the Brazilian Air Force flag uses ultramarine blue.

Brazilian military units also carry the national flag as a National Colour. This is in the dimensions 90 × 128 cm. It is mounted on the same size staff and with the same finial as the Army standard, but the cravat is divided lengthwise yellow and green, with a gold fringe at the end, tied in a bow and fastened with a cockade of blue with the Cruzeiro do Sul in white stars, yellow, and green. The staff is covered in green velvet with a yellow spiral strip. The colour belt is 10 cm in width, covered with green velvet with yellow velvet stripes of width and number varying with the rank of the organization's commander.

Unit colours differ per service branch and speciality.

==== Chile ====
Units of the Chilean Army carry one main colour, known as the estandarte de combate (combat standard). This is the same as the national flag, but with an embroidered star and with the unit designation, honorific title, founding date and place, and, depending on the unit, other historic information and honours embroidered diagonally across the fly in gold. The flag is also trimmed with gold fringe. It is mounted on a staff with a gilt condor finial; below the finial is a cravat in the national colours with decorations attached. In addition to the military colour, particularly distinguished units, and long serving units may carry a second Colour known as a bandera coronela (colonel's colour). This is a red field with a large white five-pointed star. In the angles of the star are the names and dates of battle honours surrounded by laurel wreaths, all in gold, while in an arc above the star is the designation of the unit, also in gold. The flag is also surrounded by gold fringe. Since 2017, the 16th Infantry Regiment Talca became the first to sport a blue coloured bandera coronela in honour of its origins as a city guard battalion formed during the War of the Pacific.

The Chilean Air Force, the Chilean Navy, the Carabineros de Chile and the Chilean Gendarmerie all use the estandarte de combate as their main colour, and do not use the bandera coronela at all. The design is the same as in the Army's.

==== Colombia ====
The main state colours of the Military Forces of Colombia and the National Police of Colombia is the Flag of Colombia with the Coat of arms of Colombia in the centre inside a circle with a red border, used by all the services. These flags also carry medals and decorations attached to the flag. The MFC and the NPC also uses unit battle colours (brigade-level, regiment-level and battalion-level), that differ accordingly per service. All of them are gold fringed. Uniquely for Colombia, the battle colour tradition is mainly US-influenced. In addition, the service colour is used as a secondary color, also gold fringed, to denote service affiliation.

The Navy, given the British influence, uses the national flag as a State Colour for ships and commands, and few naval units have a full strand of colours.

==== Uruguay ====
Aside from the three state colours (the Flag of Uruguay, the Artigas flag and the Flag of the Treinta y Tres), the Uruguayan military also has regimental colours that differ per service and unit. The national colours have armed colour guards while the regimental colour has none at all. All are gold fringed.

==== Venezuela ====
In the National Bolivarian Armed Forces of Venezuela, aside from the Flag of Venezuela as the National Colour, there are also Organizational Colours for each of the 6 service branches and the Ministerial Colour of the Ministry of Defence and Unit Colours, which differ per service branch and arm. Every military unit from the Ministry of defence down to all individual units have a stand of colours like in the United Kingdom, but differ from the battalion to the service and the national level. The national flag, until the 1940s, served also as the unit state colour in the same manner as the National Colour of the United States Army and the State/Sovereign's Colour in the Commonwealth of Nations, and was based on the national flag but with the unit inscription replacing the stars in the centre in white lettering. The Venezuelan National Militia is the only service branch that uses a battle colour, similar to the flag of the Cuban July 26 Movement: the colour is red and black with the service name on it in white, and a separate colour is used for the service headquarters at the Montana Barracks in Caracas. Starting from July 2013 onward it was granted permission to use a 4th colour for its battalions: red with the eyes of the late President Hugo Chávez and the inscription Chavez Vive (Chavez Lives On) below, topped with a scarlet star.

Since 2014 the National Armed Forces uses two additional colours (the National Militia its 5th and 6th): that of the Supreme Commander's Colour, which is red bearing the portrait of the late President Chávez surrounded by a wreath and the Armed Forces Motto (Independence and Socialist Fatherland, we will live on and triumph!) below and the inscription Supreme Commander of the Bolivarian Revolution (Comandante Supremo de la Revolución Bolivariana) and the eight golden stars from the National Flag above it, plus the Memorial Colour of the Liberator and Father of the Nation (introduced in the summer of 2016), which is of the same colour facing but with the wreath containing the portrait of Simon Bolivar, the eight gold stars and his title above and the words Freedom, Sovereignty, Independence (Libertad, Soberania e Independencia) below the title, all in gold.

The colours used on the Unit Colours are as follows:

- Red: Ministry of Defence (formerly grey), Service units, Marine Corps, National Militia, Military Technical Academy, Presidential Honour Guard Brigade, Caracas HQ Battalion of the Ministry of Defence
- Dark blue and red: Venezuelan Army HQ and units directing to Army HQ, Division and Brigade Colours
- Yellow: Infantry, Jungle Infantry, Airborne Units
- Orange: Rangers
- Green: Army Engineers
- Dark blue: Venezuelan Army Special Forces
- Red and Black: Rapid Action (Infantry) Battalions
- Black: Armor
- Burgundy red: Artillery and Air Defence Artillery
- Grey: Logistics, National Armed Forces Communications and Electronics College
- Navy blue: Navy
- Ultramarine blue: Air Force (formerly light green)
- Maroon: National Guard
- Dark blue and white: Bolivarian Military University of Venezuela, Military Academy of the Bolivarian Army and Armed Forces Health Sciences Academy
- Light blue and white: Venezuelan Naval Academy
- White: Venezuelan Army military high schools

== Guidons and standards ==
=== Commonwealth of Nations ===
The standard is the colours-equivalent for the heavy cavalry (e.g., horse guards and dragoon guards). At 27 by 30 in (69 by 76 cm), on an 8 ft 6 in-long (259 cm) pole, it is much smaller than infantry colours, so that it can be carried by a soldier on horseback. The guidon is the equivalent for the light cavalry (e.g., dragoons, light dragoons, hussars and lancers). It is swallow-tailed, 27 by 41 in (69 by 104 cm), with an 8 ft 6 in-long pole.

The word guidon is a corruption of the French guyde homme – 'the guide man'. (Note: The medieval "guidon, a name derived from the Fr. Guyd-homme, was somewhat similar to the standard, but without the cross of St George, rounded at the end, less elongated and altogether less ornate. It was borne by a leader of horse, and according to a medieval writer 'must be two and a half yards or three yards long, and therein shall no armes be put, but only the man's crest, cognisance, and devyce.'" (Swinburne 1911, pp. 457, 458)) Originally each troop had its own, but this was quickly reduced to a single, regimental one. With the increased dispersion of troops required in the light cavalry role, their operational function had ceased by the 1830s and they were discontinued. The regiment's kettledrums, with the battle honours woven onto the drum banners (with the exception of 3rd The King's Own Hussars and its successors, where they are uncovered, with the battle honours engraved onto the kettledrums themselves) became the focal point of the regiment's loyalty. In 1952 King George VI reintroduced the guidons of the light cavalry for ceremonial purposes.

Both the standard and the guidon are usually of crimson trimmed in gold fringe and with the regiment's insignia in the centre. The regiment's battle honours are emblazoned on both the obverse and reverse, up to a maximum of 22 on each side.

=== Denmark ===
The standard of the Guard Hussar Regiment

Cavalry (armour) units carry a standard (Danish: estandart), of similar design to the infantry colour, but smaller and square, with the cross centred on the field. The royal cypher is in the upper hoist and the initials of the regiment in the lower hoist. The Guard Hussar Regiment's standard is unique, as it has two monograms – with King Frederick VI's monogram in top right corner.

=== France ===
In the French Army, mounted units carry étendards (standards). Mounted units include armoured corps and cavalry, artillery, transportation, army aviation, and supplies. The étendard is a 64 × 64 cm square flag similar to the drapeaux carried by the units of foot, with the same design: the regimental name at the obverse and the battle honours at the reserve.

=== Italy ===
In the Italian Army, cavalry units carry a stendardo (standard) of the same pattern as the bandiera di guerra, but which measures 60 cm × 60 cm.

=== Netherlands ===
The two hussar regiments of the Royal Netherlands Army carry a standaard (standard), of similar design to the infantry colour, but smaller (50 cm × 50 cm).

=== Portugal ===
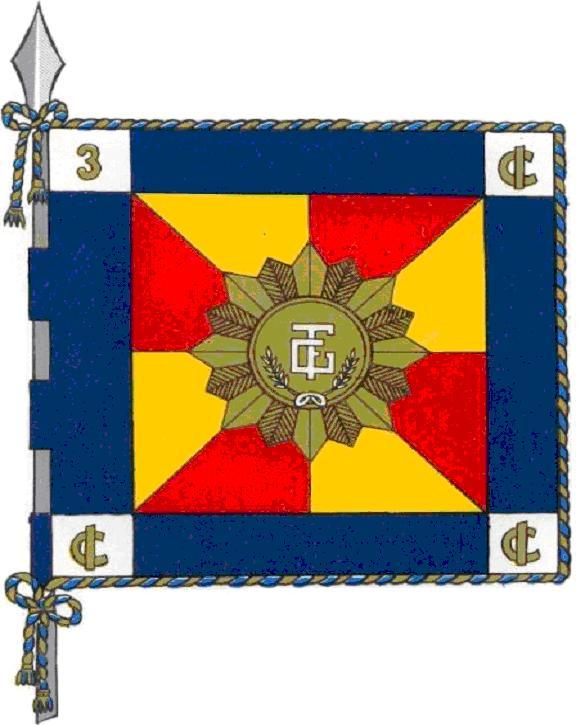
Guidon of a unit of the former Portuguese Fiscal Guard.

Until the 1960s, the Portuguese Military followed the traditions of its foot units having colours (Portuguese: bandeiras, literally "flags"), while mounted units had standards (estandartes), the latter being smaller versions of the colours. Standards were also carried by naval and aviation units. In the 1960s, the traditional separation between colours and standards was abolished, with all being reclassified as "national standards" (estandartes nacionais). At the same time, a new type of standard, the heraldic standard, was introduced. Presently, the military units, commands, forces and establishments have both a national standard and an heraldic standard. While the design of the national standards reflects the National Flag, the designs of the heraldic standards reflect the individual heraldic symbology of each of the units.

In the Portuguese military parlance, a guidon (guião) is a small square flag of a battalion sized unit. Guidons of a very simple design were introduced in the 19th century, as the tactical field signs of the foot units that didn't carry colours, namely the second battalions of the infantry regiments and the independent caçadores (light infantry) battalions. In the early 20th century, the tactical role of the guidons was discontinued. The guidons assumed then a ceremonial role, coming to have a more elaborate design which incorporated the symbology of their respective units. Guidelines for the design of guidons accordingly with heraldic rules were introduced in the 1950s, these becoming mandatory and standardized in the 1960s. The present guidon design - similar in all branches of the Military - consists in the quadrature of the coat of arms of the corresponding unit or of its parent unit, framed by a bordure. The colours of the bordure can be used to identify a sub-unit inside its parent unit.

Besides heraldic standards and guidons, the Portuguese military units also use heraldic pennants (flâmulas). These are small swallow-tailed or triangular flags used to identify company sized units.

Some of the Portuguese uniformed security forces and civil emergency organizations also make use of heraldic standards, guidons and pennants, usually modelled after the military ones.

=== United States ===
In the United States armed forces, guidons are much more prevalent, with units below battalion size being authorized to use them. In the US Army, these are swallow tailed flags that are 20 in × 27 in, and are in the colour of the branch of the service the unit is from, with the branch's insignia the most prominent device. Also on the guidon is included the unit's identifying letter, and the number(s) of its parent unit. War service and campaign streamers are not attached to these guidons, but unit citation streamers can be.

== Guns ==
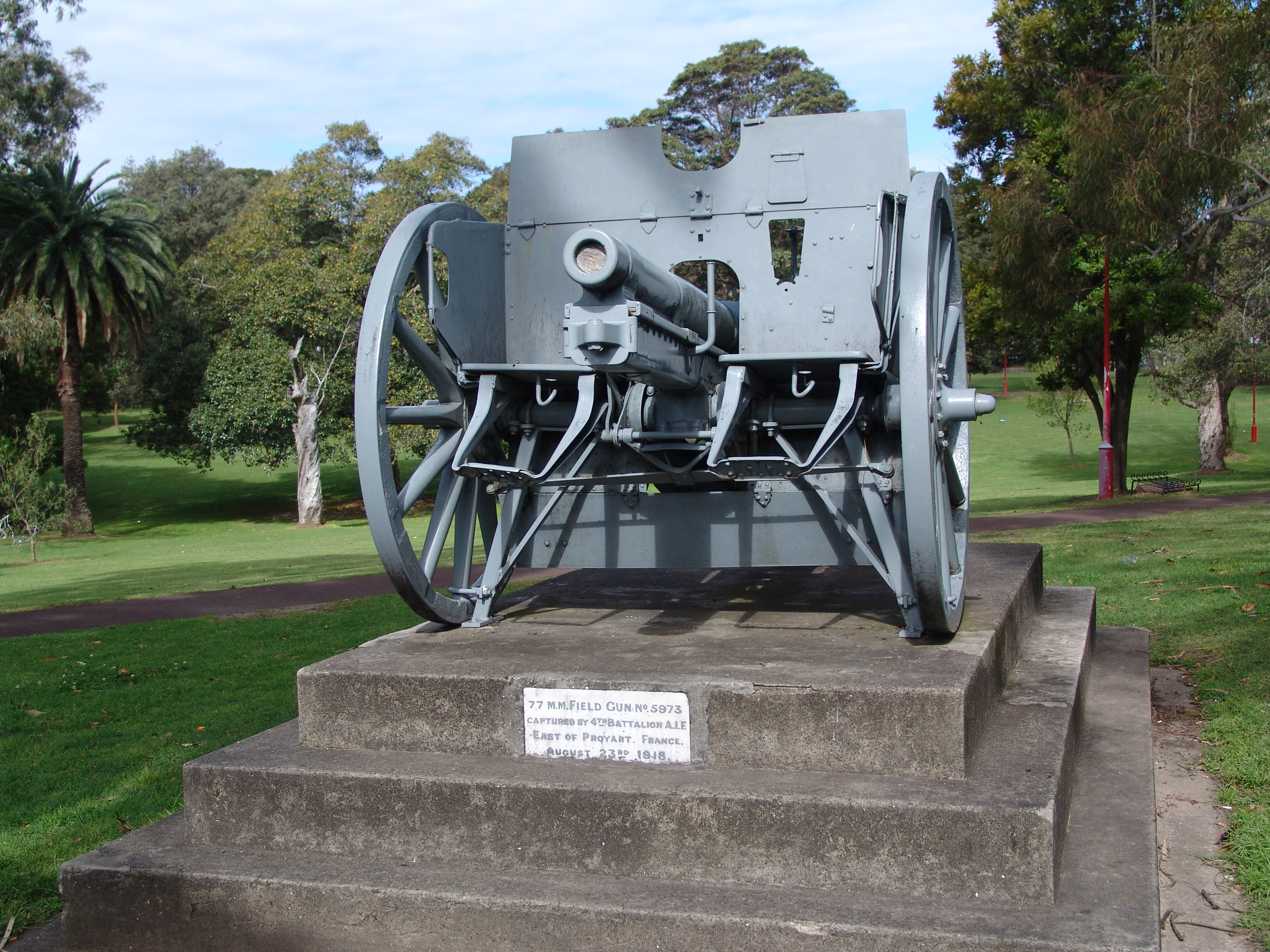
World War I German Field Gun displayed in North Sydney. The gun was allocated to the local council by the State War Trophy Committee in 1921.

In regiments of the (British) Royal Artillery, and artillery regiments of other Commonwealth countries, the guns are afforded the status of colours. This is due to the difficulty of artillery regiments being able to carry flags onto the battlefield, and the fact that the guns themselves were the rallying points for the soldiers manning them. As a consequence, whenever artillery regiments parade, the etiquette that would normally be applied to the colours is applied to the guns. During the Battle of Balaclava gunners abandoned their guns, in effect abandoning their colours, causing disgrace.

Because the guns have the status of colours, gunners of commonwealth countries will attempt to prevent their guns falling intact into enemy hands both for practical reasons (so that the guns can not be turned and used against their own side) and for the honour of the regiment. For example, the last action of gunners of the Royal Artillery during the fall of Singapore was to destroy their guns.

The Honourable Artillery Company, the oldest regiment in the British Army, and not part of the Royal Artillery, is the only artillery regiment to have both colours and guns, which are treated with equal respect.

In Singapore, however, since its independence the Singapore Army's artillery arm (the Singapore Artillery) uses colours instead of guns; this is also the case for the Malaysian Army, Pakistan Army, Royal Cambodian Army and the Royal Thai Army, whose artillery units use colours and not guns on parade. This has been the same case for the Indian Regiment of Artillery, which presents colours in dismounted parades, and the Sri Lanka Artillery, which has a strand of colours similar to the HAC.

== Etiquette ==
In some countries, the following etiquette is followed:

- The Regimental Colour (or Standard or Guidon) is always paraded whenever the regiment is on a formal parade. However, the Sovereign's (King's or Queen's)/Presidential Colour is only paraded on certain occasions.
- Compliments (for example saluting and presenting arms) are always paid to the (uncased) Colours.
- When the Colours are being paraded, they are carried either by a subaltern or warrant officer, dependent on the regiment. On parade, the Colours always have an armed escort, the Colour Party, who would normally be non-commissioned officers. In the infantry this role usually falls to Colour Sergeants.
- When the Colours are not being paraded, most regiments house them in their Officers' Mess. They are cased and secured every night.
- When a regiment is presented with new Colours, the old Colours, which will now never again be paraded, are laid up (i.e.: put on permanent display) in a place sacred to the Regiment (for example the Regimental Chapel).

== Ceremonies of colours ==
=== Royal Navy ===
The British Royal Navy and other navies of the Commonwealth of Nations call the flag-raising ceremony that happens every morning when a ship is in harbour colours. In British home waters, colours is conducted at 0800 (eight bells in the morning watch) from 15 February to 31 October inclusive, and at 0900 (two bells in the forenoon watch) during the winter.

When sunset is at or before 2100, flags are lowered at sunset at the ceremony of sunset. When sunset is after 2100, the evening flag lowering ceremony is called evening colours and carried out at 2100.

=== United States Navy ===
The United States Navy performs the same ceremonies, called "Morning Colors" and "Evening Colors", at 0800 and sunset each day. When "Colors" is played aboard Navy and Marine Corps bases, those outdoors must stop to render proper courtesies by saluting if in uniform or, if out of uniform, by standing at attention, until "Carry On" is sounded. Marines and sailors driving on base during this time are expected to stop their vehicles and stand at attention until the ceremony is over.

=== Yacht clubs ===
Many traditional yacht clubs worldwide also conduct morning and evening colour ceremonies. At 0800 each morning and at sunset during the club's active sailing season the ceremony is performed by the launchmen or harbourmaster.

- First, a bell is sounded as an alert for all members and guests present to stand at attention.
- A cannon is then fired and the national ensign hoisted (or lowered if sunset).
- At the conclusion of the ceremony the most senior officer present says: "As you were" and members and guests may carry on.

== In games ==
Capturing an enemy's flag was formerly a major goal in war, and it is still practised today, and so capturing the enemy flag also appears in several games:

- Capture the flag
- Stratego, a board game where the goal is to capture the enemy's flag
- Chess: In Estonian the queen is known as lipp ("standard"), while in Italian the bishop is called alfiere ("standard-bearer")

== See also ==
- Glossary of vexillology
- Historical colours, standards and guidons
- Presentation of Colours
- Trooping the Colour
- Vexillum
- War flag
- With flying colours
