= Flag of Spain =

Kingdom of Spain
- Other names: Bandera de España, La Rojigualda
- Use: National flag and ensign
- Proportion: 2:3
- Adopted: 28 May 1785; 241 years ago (original version, as naval and coastal fortifications' ensign); 5 October 1981; 45 years ago (current coat of arms, as established in Act 33/1981)
- Design: A horizontal triband flag of red, yellow (double width) and red.
- Designed by: Antonio Valdés y Bazán
- Use: Civil flag and ensign
- Proportion: 2:3
- Adopted: 1978
- Design: Two horizontal stripes of red (top and bottom) and yellow (middle). The yellow stripe is twice the height of each red stripe.

The national flag of Spain (Spanish: Bandera de España), (Note: In the other languages of Spain: Aragonese: Bandera d'Espanya; Asturian: Bandera d'España; Basque: Espainiako bandera; Catalan: Bandera d'Espanya; Galician: Bandeira de España; Occitan: Drapèu d'Espanha.) as it is defined in the Constitution of 1978, consists of three horizontal lines: red, yellow and red, the yellow stripe being twice the height of each red stripe. Traditionally, the middle stripe color was called by the archaic term gualda (weld, a natural dye); hence the flag's nickname la Rojigualda (the red–weld). The middle stripe bears the coat of arms of Spain, being mandatory in several cases.

The origin of the current flag of Spain is the naval ensign of 1785, Pabellón de la Marina de Guerra, by Decrée of Charles III of Spain, where it is also referred as national flag. It was chosen by Charles III among 12 different flags designed by Antonio Valdés y Bazán. The flag remained marine-focused for most of the next 50 years and flew over coastal fortresses, marine barracks and other naval properties. During the Peninsular War, the bicolor flag was used by marine regiments fighting inland, and began to be also used in Army camps and raised by many Spaniards as a symbol of resistance. In 1843, during the reign of Queen Isabella II of Spain, the flag was adopted by all the Armed Forces.

From 18th century to nowadays, the color scheme of the flag remained intact, with the exception of the Second Republic period (1931–1939); the only changes affected to the coat of arms.

== Spanish flag legal framework and specifications ==
- Spanish Constitution of 1978, establishing the national flag:

La bandera de España está formada por tres franjas horizontales, roja, amarilla y roja, siendo la amarilla de doble anchura que cada una de las rojas.

— Artículo 4 1 de la constitución española de 1978
Translation:

The flag of Spain consists of three horizontal stripes: red, yellow and red, the width of the yellow stripe being equal to the combined width of the two red stripes.

— Article 4.1 of the Spanish Constitution of 1978
- Act 39/1981, regulating the use of the flag.
- Royal Decree 441/1981, establishing the detailed technical specifications of the colors of the flag.
- Royal Decree 1511/1977, establishing the Regulations on flags, banners and emblems (Reglamento de Banderas y Estandartes, Guiones, Insignias y Distintivos)
- Royal Decree 1335/1927 (effective 1 January 1928), abolishing the 5-stripe Spanish merchant flag and establishing the plain triband – the national flag without the coat of arms – as the Spanish merchant flag.

=== Colors ===
The colors of the flag, as officially defined by the Spanish Royal Decree 441/1981 of 27 February in two CIE color spaces, are:

color	CIEHLC values			CIE-1931 (Illuminant C)			sRGB conversion (Note: Converted from the CIEHLC specification to sRGB)
	H	C	L	x	y	Y	(hexadecimal)
Flag Red (Rojo Bandera)	35°	70	37	0.614	0.320	9.5	#AD1519
Flag Gualda Yellow (Amarillo Gualda Bandera)	85°	95	80	0.486	0.469	56.7	#FABD00

The nearest Pantone shades are 7628 C (red) and 7406 C (yellow).

=== Design ===
The basic design of the current flag of Spain with the coat of arms is specified by rule 3 of the Royal Decree 1511/1977, which states the following:

- The coat of arms of Spain has a height equal to 2/5 of the hoist (height) and will figure on both sides of the flag.
- When the flag is of regular proportions, having a length equal to 3/2 of the width, the coat of arm's axis is placed at a distance from the hoist equal to 1/2 of the flag's height.
- If the flag's length is less than normal, the coat of arms is placed at the centre of the flag.

This type of triband design has become known as a Spanish fess.

== Flag protocol ==
The flag must only be flown horizontally. It can be flown from public buildings, private homes, businesses, ships, town squares, or during official ceremonies. While the flag should be flown from sunrise to sunset, government offices in Spain and abroad must fly the flag on a 24-hour basis; during the night, and in poor light, it must be properly lit. The flags must conform to the legal standards, and cannot be soiled or damaged in any way.

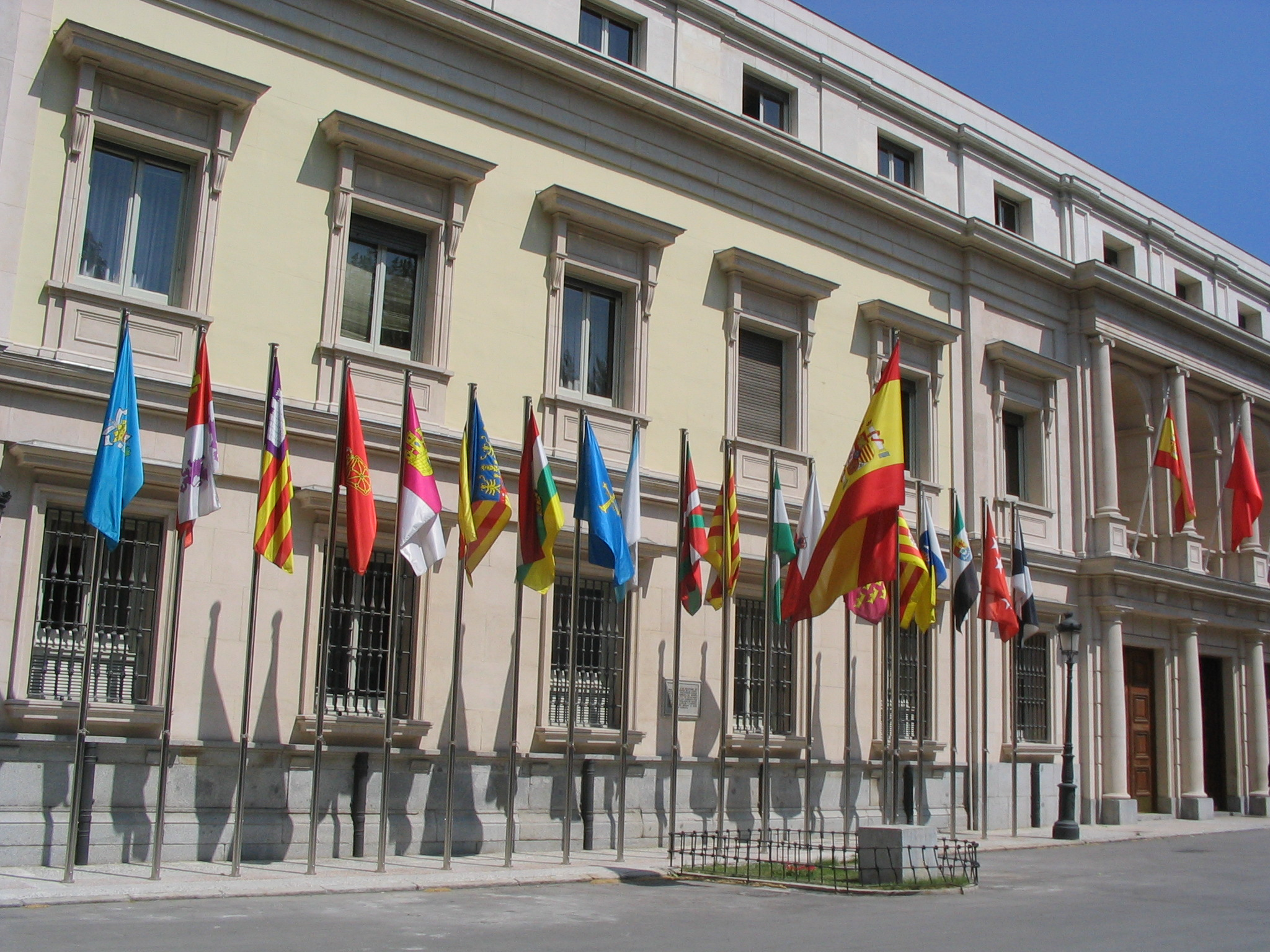
Flags in front of the Spanish Senate in Madrid

For mourning activities, the flag can be flown in either of the following ways. The first method, commonly known as half-masting, is performed when the flag is hoisted to the top of the flagpole, then lowered to the pole's one-third position. The other method is to attach a black ribbon to a flag that is permanently affixed to a staff. The ribbon itself is ten centimetres wide and it is attached to the mast so that the ends of the ribbon reach the bottom of the flag. During the funeral ceremony, the flag may be used to cover the coffins of government officials, soldiers and persons designated by an act of the President; these flags are later folded and presented to the next of kin before interment.

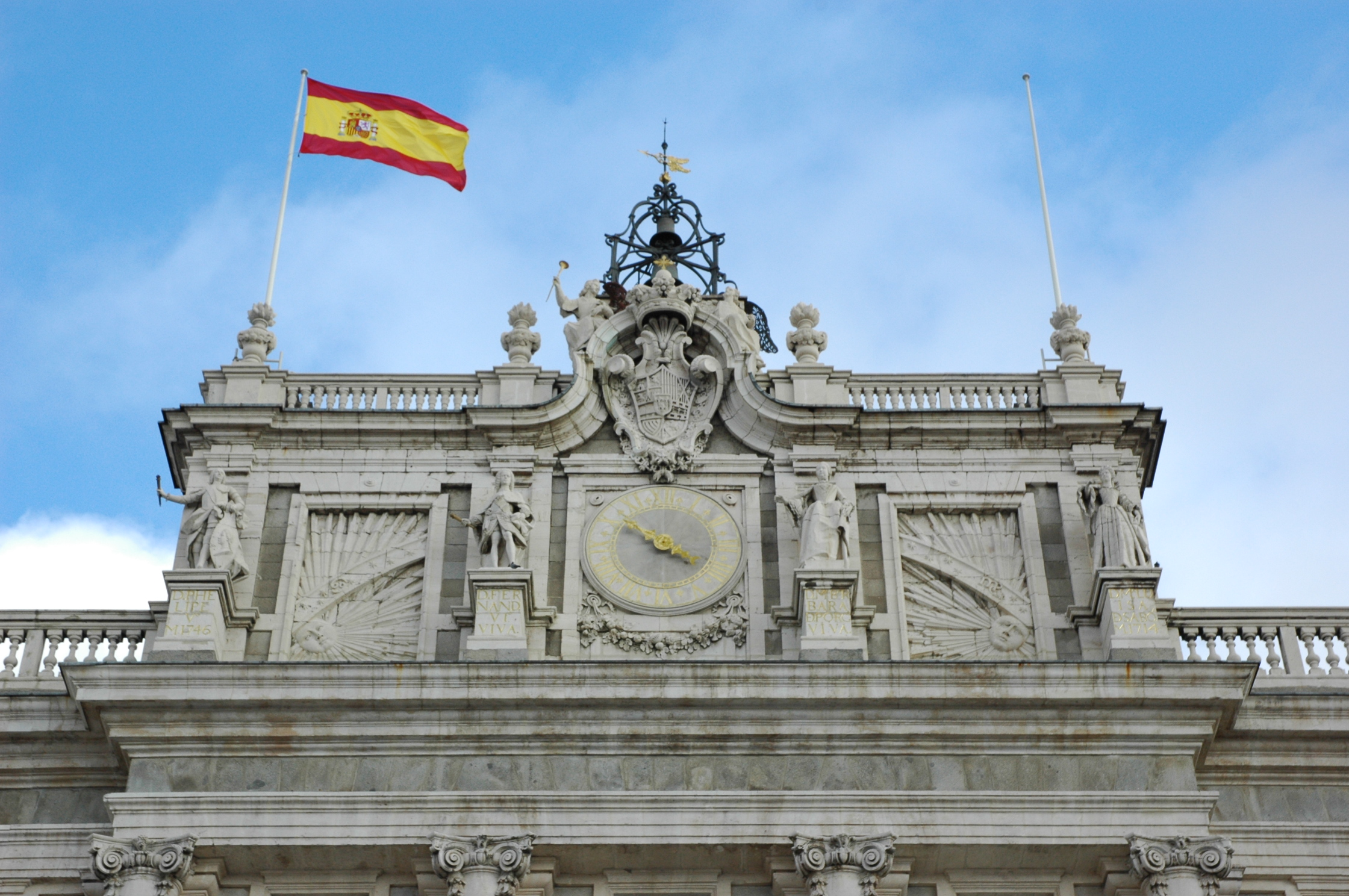
The flag of Spain on the south façade of the Royal Palace of Madrid

When flying the Spanish flag with other flags, the following is the order of precedence: the national flag, flags of foreign states, the flag of Europe, international NGOs, military and government standards, autonomous communities flags, city flags and any others. When foreign flags are used alongside the Spanish flag, the flags are sorted according to the countries' names alphabetically in the Spanish language. The only exception is when the congress or meeting held in Spain dictates a different language to be used for sorting. The flag of Europe has been hoisted since Spain became a member of the Union. While not mentioned by name in the law, the flag of NATO can also be used in Spain, since it belongs to that organization.

When unfurled in the presence of other flags, the national flag must not have smaller dimensions and must be situated in a prominent, honourable place, according to the relevant protocol.

== Other flags currently in use ==
High Civil Authorities' flag

Yacht ensign

Customs Service ensign

Spanish Navy jack

=== Civil authorities ===
Some high-ranking officials of the Spanish state are entitled to display a flag representative of their status: the Presidents of the Congress and of the Senate, and the President and members of the Council of Ministers.

=== Yacht ensign ===
The yacht ensign is the flag of Spain charged with the royal crown in blue in the centre of the yellow stripe. This flag was first established in 1875 by Royal Decree (real decreto), which provided that the central stripe would display the royal crown (corona real); this flag apparently continued to be used following the creation of the Spanish Republic in 1931, but the royal crown was changed to a blue mural crown or a blue coronet; the current version — depicting the royal crown in blue — was introduced following the restoration of the monarchy.

=== Naval jack ===
The Spanish naval jack is hoisted at the prow of all Navy ships when docked or anchored in foreign waters, from sunrise to sunset. In national waters it is hoisted on Sundays, festivities and in presence of a foreign warship as soon as it moors at the dock. The national flag is always hoisted at the stern, when sailing, and from sunrise to sunset, when docked. It is a square flag (ratio 1:1) composed of 4 quarters, matching those of the coat of arms. The current version of the jack was adopted in the early 1980s.

- First quarter, for Castile: Gules, a tower Or, masoned sable and ajouré azure;
- Second quarter, for León: Argent, a lion rampant gules (differing from the one on the national flag) crowned, langued and armed or;
- Third quarter, for Aragon: Or, four pallets gules;
- Fourth quarter, for Navarre: Gules, a cross, saltire and orle of chains linked together Or, a centre point vert.

=== Flags for Armed Forces ===
The flag used by the Spanish Armed Forces is the same one that is used as the state flag and national ensign. Military units, however, use a less oblong, more square version (full size dimensions 12.80 by 14.75 metres (42.0 ft × 48.4 ft)) charged with the name of the unit.

Army unit flag

Army flag under Francoist Spain made for castles and forts (1940–1945)

=== Royal Standards of Spain ===
Royal standard

Princess of Asturias's standard

Royal standard of King Emeritus

The King of Spain uses a flag known as the Royal Standard. The Royal Standard of Spain consists of a crimson square with the Coat of arms of the King in the centre. It is usually flown at the King's official residence, the Palacio de la Zarzuela, other Spanish royal sites, or displayed on his official car as small flags. It is regulated by clause 2 of Royal Decree 527/2014, 20 June, an amendment to Title II of Spanish Royal Decree 1511/1977 adopting Flags, Standards, Guidons, Insignia and Emblems Regulation.

The Royal Guidon (Guión), the monarch's military personal ensign, is described by Rule 1 of Royal Decree 527/2014, an amendment to Title II, Rule 1 of Spanish Royal Decree 1511/1977. It is nearly identical to the Royal Standard except that the Royal Guidon has a Gold fringe. It is made of silk taffeta. The size of the guidon is 80 cm × 80 cm (31 in × 31 in). It is the personal command ensign or positional flag of the monarch, and is carried near him.

The heir to the crown, the Princess of Asturias, has her own standard and guidon. The Standard of the Princess of Asturias is regulated by Royal Decree 284/2001 that modified the Title II of Spanish Royal Decree 1511/1977. The Standard of the Princess of Asturias consists of a light blue (the color of the flag of Asturias) square flag with the coat of arms of the Princess of Asturias in the center. The Guidon is identical to the Standard except that the Royal Guidon has a gold fringe. It is made of silk taffeta. The size of the guidon is 80 cm × 80 cm (31 in × 31 in). It has fallen into disuse because of the Princess's young age.

== History ==
Pennant of the Catholic Monarchs (until 1492)

Standard of the Crown of Castile

Standard of the Crown of Aragon

While the concept of a national flag did not exist in the Middle Ages, the symbol of Spain was the Royal Shield. It was frequently made up of other different flags, full of images and symbols that represented all the values that the troops or the King defended.

=== Standard of the Catholic monarchs ===
Banner of the Catholic Monarchs' infantry

In Spain the medieval kingdoms which merged in the sixteenth century had their own heraldic symbols and their navies used to display their own flags and standards on both the Mediterranean Sea and the Atlantic Ocean, where the Aragonese and Castilian Crowns had their respective areas of influence. The flag of the Crown of Aragon was a yellow flag with four red stripes (an element which is still common in the present flags of the territories that formed the Crown: Aragon, Catalonia, Valencia, the Balearic Islands and Roussillon in France). The Crown of Castile, since the final union between the kingdoms of Castile and León in 1230, used a quartered flag alternating the Castilian (Gules, a tower Or, masoned sable and ajouré azure) and Leonese (Argent, a lion rampant purpure crowned or, langued and armed gules) emblems. Aragonese and Castilian flags and coats of arms merged when the Catholic monarchs created the new symbols of their personal union of the crowns in 1475.

The banner of Castile and León was the first European symbol to arrive in the New World.

=== Cross of Burgundy ===
Cross of Burgundy flag

The Cross of Burgundy was introduced to Spain after the marriage of Joanna of Castile to Philip the Handsome, Duke of Burgundy in 1496. The flag was the primary symbol of Philip the Handsome. It introduced into Spanish vexillology a design that, although of foreign origin, would become the primary symbol of Spain. The flag was usually embroidered on white or yellow cloth. The Cross of Burgundy is also known as "The Vane of Burgundy" or La Cruz de San Andrés as it is derived from St. Andrew's Cross. Since the reign of Charles I of Spain (1516–1556), different Spanish armies have used flags with the Cross of Burgundy on different fields. It was also incorporated in the uniforms of Burgundian archers, and later in the uniforms of the rest of the army. It also appeared on Spanish regimental flags.

=== Habsburg Spain ===
When the House of Habsburg took the Spanish throne by mid-16th century each military company had its own flag in which appeared usually the arms of its commander over the Cross of Burgundy. In order to represent the King, they used to have another one, the "Coronela", during the reign of Charles I (Charles V as Holy Roman Emperor) that was made of yellow silk (the imperial color) with the embroidered imperial shield.

When Philip II came to power, he ordered that, in addition to the flags of each company, each Tercio should have another one in yellow with the Cross of Burgundy in red. The units of Cavalry took the same flags but of smaller size, called Banners.

However, at this time the concept of a national flag as understood nowadays did not exist, and so the true symbol of the nationality was represented by the Royal arms. The use of other flags besides the mentioned ones was frequent, with various images or symbols. Some examples are the flag of Santiago (Saint James the Great), the green one the Emperor took during the conquest of Tunisia or the crimson one used by Hernán Cortés in Mexico.

=== Philip V and the new Bourbon dynasty ===
Military flag of Philip V

Bourbonic ensign (1701–1760)

Bourbonic ensign (1760–1785)

The arms of Bourbon-Anjou were added in 1700 when Philip V became King of Spain. He introduced several changes on the royal arms. The king's new arms were designed by the French heraldists Charles-René d'Hozier and Pierre Clairambault in November 1700. Philip V also changed the philosophy and the design of the flags of Spain. He was the first to give Spain a unified symbol of its own when putting on white fabric the Cross of Burgundy and the Royal coat of arms. It still was not a national flag, but a first attempt, in line with similar attempts in other European nations.

The flags were organized in three groups:

- Standard or Royal flag: it continued being crimson, with the royal arms embroidered, the Golden Fleece and the collar of the Order of the Holy Spirit.
- Military flag: the color was reduced to white with the Cross of Burgundy and the Royal arms.
- Pavilion of the Navy: again white, with the Royal arms.

The white color, characteristic of the Bourbons, was the fabric used in the 18th century by the various Bourbon branches reigning in France, Naples, Tuscany, Parma, and Sicily, as well as in Spain. This fact compromised and made it difficult to distinguish the respective national flags of ships. For this reason, at some point (likely after some fateful mistake), a change in the flag of Spain's warships began to be considered. This is supported by the fact that in an article from His Majesty's Ordinances for the Military, Political, and Economic Government of his Naval Armada, from 1748, Ferdinand VI established that:

"Por ahora, usarán todos los navíos de la Armada la bandera ordinaria nacional blanca con el escudo de mis armas, hasta que yo tenga a bien disponer otra cosa. Y, entre tanto, no arbolarán otra sino en las ocasiones en que es permitido según estilo de mar."

For now, all ships in the Armada will use the ordinary national white flag with my coat of arms until I see fit to arrange otherwise. In the meantime, they won't fly any other flag except on occasions permitted by maritime custom.

In 1760, Charles III modified the shield of the Royal arms, suppressing the collar of the Holy Spirit, maintained the Golden Fleece and added two new quarters, corresponding to the House of Farnese (six blue lilies on gold) and Medici (five red discs and one blue disc with three lilies of gold, all on gold).

The military flag or Coronela of Spanish regiments was, during the Bourbon years, the Cross of Burgundy with different additions in each military unit depending on their territorial origin, commander, etc.

=== Origins of the present ensign: Charles III ===
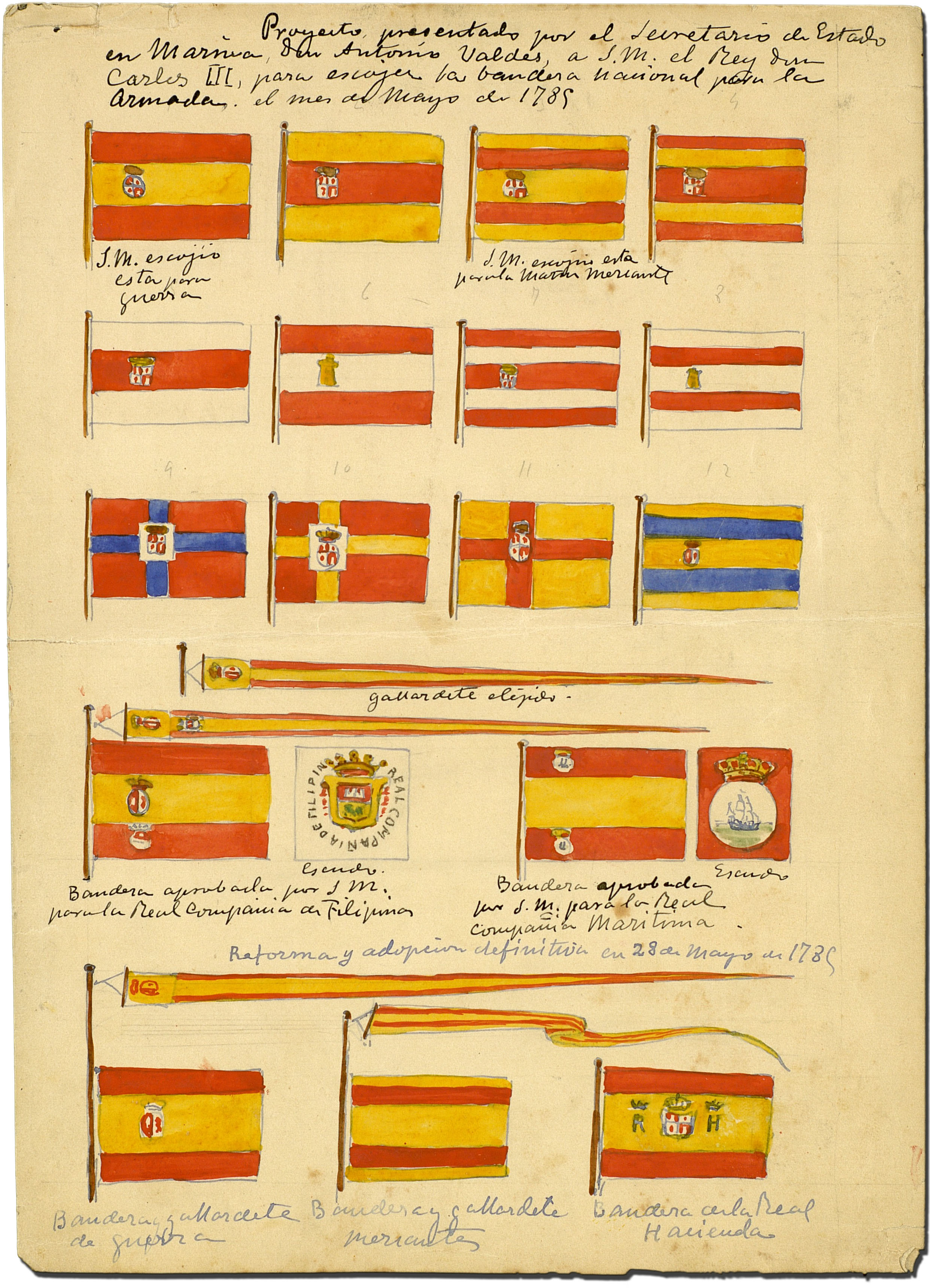
The original proposals made to Charles III in 1785

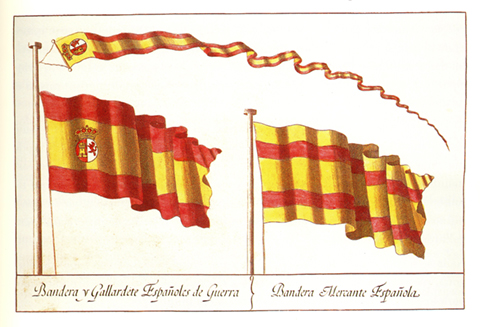
The flags chosen as war and merchant ensigns

Navy and coastal fortifications' flag (1785–1931). National flag (1785-1808/1813–1873/1874–1931)

National flag during the First Spanish Republic (1873–1874)

Merchant marine's flag (1785–1927)

King Charles III commissioned Antonio Valdés y Fernández Bazán, the Secretary of State and Universal Department of the Navy (Minister of the Navy), to design a new, easily identifiable flag for the Armada. That is, one that would not be confused with the sails, would stand out against the colors of the sky and sea, would be visible in unfavorable weather, and would not be mistaken for those of other nations. Valdés' cabinet developed a proposal with twelve different versions.

In the drawing containing the twelve versions, the flags are grouped into three rows of four flags each, presenting different combinations of colors and coat of arms formats. In the first row, the chosen colors for the variants use red and yellow. In the second row, the flags are identical to those in the first one, but substituting white for yellow. In the third row, cruciform versions of the flags predominate.

Finally, Charles III, through the Royal Decree of May 28, 1785, established a new national ensign:

Para evitar los inconvenientes, y perjuicios, que ha hecho ver la experiencia puede ocasionar la Bandera nacional, de que usa mi Armada naval, y demas Embarcaciones Españolas, equivocándose á largas distancias, ó con vientos calmosos con las de otras Naciones; he resuelto, que en adelante usen mis Buques de guerra de Bandera dividida á lo largo en tres listas, de las que la alta, y la baxa sean encarnadas, y del ancho cada una de la quarta parte del total, y la de en medio amarilla, colocándose en esta el Escudo de mis Reales Armas reducido á los dos quarteles de Castilla, y Leon con la Corona Real encima; y el Gallardete con las mismas tres listas, y el Escudo á lo largo, sobre quadrado amarillo en la parte superior: Y de las demas Embarcaciones usen, sin Escudo, los mismos colores, debiendo ser la lista de en medio amarilla, y del ancho de la tercera parte de la Bandera, y cada una de las restantes partes dividida en dos listas iguales encarnada, y amarilla alternativamente, todo con arreglo al adjunto diseño. No podrá usarse de otros pavellones en los Mares del Norte por lo respectivo á Europa hasta el paralelo de Tenerife en el Océano, y en el Mediterraneo desde primero del año de mil setecientos ochenta y seis: en la América Septentrional desde principio de Julio siguiente; y en los demas Mares desde primero del año de mil setecientos ochenta y siete. Tendréislo entendido para su cumplimiento.

To avoid the inconveniences and damages that experience has shown can be caused by the national flag used by my naval Armada and other Spanish vessels, which can be mistaken at long distances or in calm winds for those of other Nations; I have resolved that henceforth my warships shall use a flag divided lengthwise into three stripes, of which the top and bottom shall be crimson, each a quarter of the total width, and the middle one yellow, with the coat of arms of my Royal Arms reduced to the two quarters of Castile and Leon with the Royal Crown above placed upon it; and the pennant with the same three stripes, and the coat or arms lengthwise on a yellow square in the upper part: And other vessels shall use the same colors without the coat of arms, the middle stripe being yellow and one-third the width of the flag, and each of the remaining parts divided into two equal stripes, crimson and yellow alternately, all in accordance with the attached design. No other ensigns may be used in the Northern Seas with respect to Europe up to the parallel of Tenerife in the Ocean, and in the Mediterranean from the first day of the year one thousand seven hundred eighty-six: in North America from the beginning of the following July; and in the other Seas from the first day of the year one thousand seven hundred eighty-seven. You shall understand this for its compliance.

The design selected by the monarch corresponds to the versions of Valdés' proposal that use red and yellow colors; specifically, the one with three horizontal stripes, red, yellow, and red, respectively. However, it differs regarding the central stripe, which became double the width of the top and bottom stripes, so that the coat of arms could be larger. For the same purpose, the coat of arms was simplified to only the quarters of Castile and León and was placed offset towards the mast or hoist (not horizontally centered on the central stripe); this made it easier to identify and see it when the flag was not fully unfurled.

Beyond achieving better identification at sea and distancing itself from other Bourbon kingdoms by discarding the dynastic white color from the national flag, some authors believe that the flag's design, based on red and yellow colors, plus the coat of arms, also represents a fusion of the symbology of the kingdoms that originally formed Spain. This resulted in a common national symbol: colors derived from the Aragonese flag, a Castilian coat of arms, and the whole being Spanish.

In 1793, through the General Ordinances of the Naval Armada, it was ordered that the national ensign should fly in maritime plazas, their castles or others on the coasts, as well as in arsenals, shipyards, and barracks of the Armada.

=== 19th century ===
Already in the 19th century, the red and yellow flag also began to be used in Army camps and border fortifications, although the Army flags differed from those of the Navy in the representation of the coat of arms: quartered in the first case and split in the second.

From 1808 onwards, given the explosion of patriotic sentiment during the War of Independence, the red-weld was used by the people and for volunteer enlistment flags, and were made official as the colors of the Cortes de Cádiz and the National Militia.

In 1843, the decree of October 13, from the Second Government of Joaquín María López, set forth the necessity of suppressing the differences between the national ensign and those particular to army corps, ordering the unification of all flags and standards of the armed forces:

Las banderas y estandartes de todos los cuerpos e institutos que componen el Ejército, la Armada y la Milicia Nacional, usarán iguales en colores a la bandera de guerra española, y colocados éstos por el mismo orden que lo están en ella.

The flags and standards of all corps and institutions that make up the Army, Navy, and National Militia will use the same colors as the Spanish war flag, and these will be arranged in the same order as they are on it.

=== First Spanish Republic ===
The First Spanish Republic, established in 1873, did not alter the colors of the flag, but all royal symbols of the monarchy were removed from the coat of arms.

=== Early 20th century ===
In 1908, through the Royal Decree ordering the Spanish flag to fly on all public buildings on national holidays, extending to hangings and illuminations, it was established that it was compulsory for the flag to fly on all public buildings on national holidays. By Royal Decree of July 19, 1927, during the Dictatorship of Primo de Rivera, it was arranged that the merchant navy would use the same ensign as the war flag but without the shield, and the five-stripe civil ensign was suppressed.

=== Second Spanish Republic ===
Coat of arms of the Kingdom of Castile

State flag of the Second Spanish Republic

Civil flag of the Second Spanish Republic

On 14 April 1931, the Spanish monarchy was abolished and replaced by the Second Spanish Republic. The regime change was symbolized by a new tricolor flag, red, yellow and murrey (Spanish: morado), instead of the previous red and yellow bicolor, and changing the coat of arms to the design that appeared on the reverse of the five pesetas coins minted by the provisional government in 1869 and 1870, moved to the central position on the yellow stripe. The three stripes had the same width. In addition to symbolizing the radical change in the system of government, the inclusion of the third color sought to recognize Castile as a vital part of a new state. This was based on the assumption that the red and yellow colors represented the Crown of Aragon, and the belief that the flag of Castile had been murrey. Many authors consider erroneous that the flag of Castile was murrey, but crimson.

=== Spanish State ===
Flag of Spain under Franco (1936–1938)

Flag of Spain under Franco (1938–1945)

Flag of Spain under Franco (1945–1977)

The Spanish Civil War officially ended on 1 April 1939, when the last Spanish Republican outposts were overrun by the Nationalists. The Republican regime in Spain was destroyed and Francisco Franco became the Caudillo of the country and remained in power until his death on 20 November 1975.

On 29 August 1936, the National Defense Junta issued Decree No. 77 that declared: "The red and gold/yellow bicolor flag is re-established as the flag of Spain", which served as the first flag of Nationalist Spain. This flag was replaced in 1938 by a flag bearing the Eagle of Saint John added to the shield. The new arms were allegedly inspired in the coat of arms the Catholic Monarchs adopted after the taking of Granada (represented using a granada, word that also means 'pomegranate' in Spanish) from the Moors, but replacing the arms of the Kingdom of Sicily for those of Navarre, and adding the Pillars of Hercules on each flank of the coat of arms. In 1938 the columns were placed outside the wings.

On 26 July 1945, the commander's ensigns were suppressed by decree, and on 11 October a detailed regulation of flags was published, that fixed the model of the bi-color flag in use, with a new version of the Saint John eagle. The models established on that decree were in force until 1977.

During this period two more flags were usually displayed together with the national flag: the flag of Spanish Falange (three vertical strips, red, black, red, with the black stripe being wider than the red ones, and the yoke and arrows emblem in red placed on the centre of the black stripe) and the Carlist flag (the Saint Andrew saltire or Cross of Burgundy red on white) as representation of the National Movement.

=== Spanish transition ===
Flag of Spain from 1977 to 1981

From the death of Franco in 1975 until 1977, the national flag remained that of the 1945 regulation. On 21 January 1977 a new flag was approved, differing from the previous one in that the eagle's wings opened further (the "pasmada" eagle), the Pillars of Hercules were again placed within the wings, and the banderole with the motto UNA, GRANDE Y LIBRE (ONE, GREAT and FREE) written in a serif font was moved from the eagle's neck to above the eagle's head. Not many flags with this coat of arms were produced.

Article 42 section 12 of the Spanish Constitution of 1978, which was promulgated during the transition to democracy, stipulates that the flag "is formed by three horizontal stripes, red, yellow and red, the yellow being double the width of each of the red ones." The present-day coat of arms were adopted on 19 December 1981.

== Unofficial flags and uses ==
The unofficial nickname Red-Weld (Spanish: Rojigualda) is sometimes used to refer to the national flag of Spain. Over time, some unofficial flags have been used to represent Spain in different contexts and events, such as:

- At some point during the 1990s an unofficial version of the Spanish flag sporting an Osborne bull superimposed as some sort of "coat of arms" began appearing in football arenas. This usage has become increasingly popular and this flag is easily seen nowadays during sports events, football or others, which include a Spanish team or player, or the Spanish national team itself.
- The flag of the Second Republic, with the indigo strip, is often seen in rallies organized by those closely associated to the Second Spanish Republic. The flag is mostly used by left-leaning people to express dislike for the monarchy.
- A Spanish flag with a superimposed kicked football was used as the emblem of the 1982 FIFA World Cup.
- The yellow and red colors used on the "pecten" logo of Shell plc possibly relate to the colors of the flag of Spain, as Shell built early service stations in the state of California which had strong connections with Spain.
- The Spanish flag is used in the reverse of the Texas state seal as one of the six flags over Texas, as well as in the seal of the city of Mobile, Alabama.
- A new Iberian union is a political prospect proposed by Iberism thinkers in which Portugal and Spain would be united. There are several flag options most of them combining both countries' colors and coats of arms. One of earliest the most well known proposals was created by Sinibald de Mas i Sans and was probably inspired by the flag of the maritime province of Barcelona. The P&O maritime house flag has been a combination of Spanish and Portuguese royal colors since 1837.
Iberian Union flag proposal in 1854

Spanish flag with the Sacred Heart used by Carlism

== See also ==
- List of proposed Spanish flags
- List of Spanish flags
- Spanish fess
- Flag of Austria, similar design (white stripe instead of yellow)
