= Coat of arms of the King of Spain =

- Armiger: Felipe VI
- Adopted: 19 June 2014
- Crest: Spanish Royal Crown
- Shield: Quarterly: Castile, León, Aragon, and Navarre; enté en point: Granada; inescutcheon Bourbon (Anjou Branch)
- Order: Order of the Golden Fleece
- Earlier version: See below

The coat of arms of the King or (Queen) of the Kingdom of Spain is the heraldic symbol representing the Sovereign of the Kingdom of Spain. The current version of the sovereign's coat of arms was adopted in 2014 but is of much older origin. The arms marshal the arms of the former monarchs of Castile, León, Aragon, and Navarre.

Traditionally, coats of arms did not belong to a nation but to the monarch who would quarter his shield with territorial claims of his dynasty. Formerly, the Spanish monarch's arms were much more complex than they are today, featuring the arms of the various territories of this dynasty. A simpler version of these arms, known as the lesser arms, was also used; The lesser arms were another set of arms within the centre of the full arms. During the later part of the Bourbon dynasty, this was quarterly Castile and León.

In 1868, during the provisional government that followed the overthrow of Isabella II, Queen of Spain arms of national character was adopted; This 1868 arms created the present-day arrangement of elements in the shield. The "national arms" and "royal arms" coexisted after the restoration of the monarchy. In 1931, the "national arms" were revised into the royal arms, replacing the former lesser arms of the King (i.e. quarterly Castile and León). The monarchy was abolished later that year.

When Juan Carlos, grandson of Alfonso XIII (the last king of Spain), was chosen to be the successor of General Francisco Franco, the arms adopted for his use in 1971 as Prince of Spain was quarterly Castile, Leon, Aragon, and Navarre. The heraldic achievement also included the collar of the Order of the Golden Fleece, the Cross of Burgundy and the yoke and bundle of arrows formerly used by the Catholic Monarchs, the same arms he would use as King. Upon Felipe VI's ascension to the throne in 2014, the cross, yoke, and arrows were dropped from the royal arms.

== Blazon ==
The blazoning of the coat of arms of the King of Spain is set out in Royal Decree 527/2014, 20 June, an amendment to Title II of Spanish Royal Decree 1511/1977 adopting Flags, Standards, Guidons, Insignia and Emblems Regulation. The coat of arms was adopted when King Felipe VI was proclaimed as King of Spain.

The shield is divided into four-quarters, blazoned as follows:

- 1st, gules a castle or, triple-embattled and voided gate and windows, with three towers each triple-turreted, of the field, masoned sable and ajoure azure, which is for Castile;
- 2nd, argent a lion rampant purpure crowned or, langued and armed, of the second, which is for León;
- 3rd, or, four pallets gules, which is for Aragon;
- 4th, gules a cross, saltire and orle of chains linked together or, a centre point vert, which is for Navarre;

Argent enté en point, with a pomegranate proper seeded gules, supported, sculpted and leafed in two leaves vert, which is for Granada.

Inescutcheon azure bordure gules, three fleurs-de-lys or, which is for Bourbon-Anjou. This is not an inescutcheon of pretence, but one in use by monarchs and states, in this case the Spanish Royal Family to show their descent from the French House of Bourbon through the Anjou line.

All surrounded by the collar of the Golden Fleece and crowned with a crown of the same metal and precious stones, with eight rosettes, five visible, and eight pearls interspersed, closed at the top by eight diadems also adorned with pearls and surmounted by a cross on a globe, which is the royal crown of Spain.

In 1969, General Francisco Franco appointed Juan Carlos I as his "successor to the Headship of the Spanish state with the title of King" but gave him the new title of Prince of Spain instead of the traditional title of Prince of Asturias. From 1971 to 1975, Juan Carlos as Prince of Spain used a coat of arms which was virtually identical to the one later adopted when he became King in 1975. Earlier coat of arms differed only that it featured the royal crown of a Crown Prince of Spain, the King's royal crown has eight half-arches of which five are visible, while the Prince's one has only four half-arches of which three are visible. Joined to the shield was the red saltire of Burgundy and, to the dexter and sinister of the base point, the yoke gules in its natural position with ribbons, of the field, and the sheaf of five arrows gules with the arrowheads inverted and ribbons, of the field, which used to be the symbol of the Catholic Monarchs of Spain.

The cross of Burgundy, the yoke and arrows had not been used by any Spanish monarch since the Catholic Monarchs and were added to symbolize the Movimiento Nacional.

Since June 2014, Juan Carlos's son, Felipe VI, has been using the same arms but without the cross of Burgundy, yoke and arrows. King Juan Carlos's arms include a red lion instead of the purple one displayed on the current version

== Variants ==
Variants of the coat of arms of the King of Spain
Variant as Grand Master of the Order of Charles III; Surrounded by the collar of this order	Variant as Grand Master of the Order of Isabella the Catholic; Surrounded by the collar of this order	Variant as Grand Master of the Order of Saint Ferdinand Surrounded by the grand master's collar of this order	Variant as Grand Master of the Order of Saint Hermenegild; Surrounded by the grand master's collar of this order

== Ornamented versions of the historical royal coats of arms ==
Royal Arms	Monarch	Supporters	Other ornaments	Motto
House of Trastámara (1475–1506)
	The Catholic Monarchs (1474–1492)	Two lions (adopted by John II of Castile); The Eagle of St John	The former royal crown	
	The Catholic Monarchs (1492–1504)	Two lions; The Eagle of St John (as displayed at the Church of St Paul in Valladolid)	The crown of the Catholic Monarchs; A yoke; A sheaf of five arrows	Tanto monta (Spanish: They amount to the same)
	Ferdinand II of Aragon (1504–1516) (After the death of queen Isabella)	Two griffins (as displayed at the Aljafería Palace in Zaragoza)	The former royal crown of Aragon	
	Joanna of Castile (1504–1506)	The Eagle of St John; Two lions (as displayed at the facade of the Church of Saint Mary the Royal in Aranda de Duero, Burgos Province)	The former royal crown; A yoke; A sheaf of five arrows	
	Philip I of Castile (1504–1506) (with Joanna)	The Eagle of St John and one lion (as displayed on his seal)	The royal crest of Castile; The former royal crown; A helmet; Gold and ermine mantling; The Order of the Golden Fleece	Qui voudra (Old French: Whoever will accept)
House of Habsburg (1506–1700)
	Charles I King of Castile (1506–1516); Spanish Monarch (1516–1520)	The Eagle of St John and one lion (as displayed on his seal)	The royal crest of Castile; The former royal crown; A helmet; Gold and ermine mantling; The Order of the Golden Fleece	Plus oultre Later Plus ultra (French/Latin: Further beyond)
	Charles I (1520–1530)	The Eagle of St John and one lion	The royal crest of Castile; The former royal crown; A helmet; Gold and ermine mantling; The Order of the Golden Fleece	Plus ultra
	Charles I Charles V as Holy Roman Emperor (1530–1556)	The Double-headed eagle (in some variants showed within his arms)	The imperial crest; The imperial crown; A helmet; Gold and ermine mantling; The Order of the Golden Fleece	Plus ultra
	Philip II (1554–1558); Also King Jure Uxoris of England with Mary I	The Eagle of St John (Duplicate) (as displayed in Windsor Castle as Knight of the Garter)	The royal crest of Castile; A cap of maintenance (England); Gold and ermine mantling; The Order of the Garter	Honi soit qui mal y pense (Old French: Shame be to him who thinks evil of it)
1558–1580 / 1668–1700 1580–1668	Philip II (1580–1598); Philip III (1598–1621); Philip IV (1621–1665); Charles II (1665–1668)	One lion and one griffin	The royal crest of Aragon; The royal crest of Castile; The royal crest of Portugal; The former royals crowns of Aragon, Castile and Portugal; Three helmets; Gold and ermine mantling; The Order of the Golden Fleece	
House of Bourbon (1700–1808 / 1813–1868 / 1874–1931 / 1975–present)
	Philip V (First reign) (1700–1724); Louis (1724); Philip V (Second reign) (1724–1746); Ferdinand VI (1746–1759); Charles III (1759–1761)	Two angels (as well as a lance with two royal standards); The Pillars of Hercules	The sun; The royal crest of Castile; The former royal crown; The royal mantle; The modern royal crown (with eight half-arches); A helmet; Gold and ermine mantling; The Order of the Golden Fleece; The Order of the Holy Spirit	A solis ortu usque ad occasum (Latin: From the rising up of the sun unto the going down of the same) Psalm 112:3; Plus ultra; Santiago
	Charles III (1761–1788); Charles IV (1788–1808); Ferdinand VII (1808); Ferdinand VII (Restored) (1808–1833); Isabella II (1833–1868); Alfonso XII (1874–1885); Alfonso XIII (1886–1931)	Two angels (as well as a lance with two royal standards); The Pillars of Hercules	The sun; The royal crest of Castile; The former royal crown; The royal mantle; The modern royal crown (with eight half-arches); A helmet; Gold and ermine mantling; The Order of the Golden Fleece; The Order of Charles III	A solis ortu usque ad occasum; Plus ultra; Santiago
	Juan Carlos I (1975)	The Cross of Burgundy	The modern royal crown (with eight half-arches); The Order of the Golden Fleece; A yoke; A sheaf of five arrows	
French occupation (1808–1813)
	Joseph Bonaparte (1808–1813)	Two sceptres	The modern royal crown (with eight half-arches); The royal mantle; The Order of the Golden Fleece; The Legion of Honour	
House of Savoy (1870–1873)
	Amadeus (1870–1873)		The modern royal crown (with eight half-arches); The royal mantle; The Order of the Golden Fleece	

== Royal family ==
Arms of Members of the Royal Family, their spouses & children.

Armorial achievement	Bearer
	Personal Arms of Letizia, Queen of Spain
	Personal Arms of Sofia, Queen of Spain
	Arms of Leonor, Princess of Asturias
	Personal Arms of Infanta Elena, Duchess of Lugo
	Personal Arms of Infanta Cristina
	Personal Arms of Infanta Margarita, Duchess of Soria and Hernani
	Personal Arms of Princess Anne, Dowager Duchess of Calabria
	Personal Arms of Don Felipe de Marichalar y Borbón
	Personal Arms of Dona Victoria de Marichalar y Borbón
	Personal Arms of Don Juan Urdangarin y Borbón
	Personal Arms of Don Pablo Nicolás Urdangarin y Borbón
	Personal Arms of Don Miguel Urdangarin y Borbón
	Personal Arms of Dona Irene Urdangarin y Borbón
	Personal Arms of Carlos Zurita, Duke of Soria
	Personal Arms of Don Alfonso Carlos Zurita y Borbón
	Personal Arms of Dona María Zurita y Borbón
	Personal Arms of Don Pedro de Borbón-Dos Sicilias y Orleans
	Personal Arms of Dona Inés de Borbón-Dos Sicilias y Bourbon-Parma

== See also ==
- Coat of arms of Charles V, Holy Roman Emperor
- Armorial of Spanish monarchs in Italy
- Coat of arms of the Prince of Asturias
- Coat of arms of the Prince of Spain
- Royal Standard of Spain
