= Coat of arms of the Prince of Spain =

- Armiger: Juan Carlos de Borbón
- Adopted: 22 April 1971
- Crest: Crown of the Prince of Spain
- Shield: Quarterly: Castile, León, Aragon, and Navarre; enté en point: Granada; inescutcheon Bourbon (Anjou Branch)
- Supporters: Cross of Burgundy
- Order: Order of the Golden Fleece
- Other elements: Base point, the yoke with ribbons and the sheaf of five arrows.

The Coat of arms of the Prince of Spain was set out in the Spanish Decree 814 of 22 April 1971, by which the Rules for Flags, Standards, Guidons, Banners, and Badges were adopted.

== Blazon ==
The shield was divided into four quarters, blazoned as follows:

- 1st, gules a castle or, triple-embattled and voided gate and windows, with three towers each triple-turreted, of the field, masoned sable and ajoure azure, which was for Castile;
- 2nd, argent a lion rampant purpure crowned or, langued and armed, of the second, which was for León;
- 3rd, or, four pallets gules, which was for Aragon;
- 4th, gules a cross, saltire and orle of chains linked together or, a centre point vert, which was for Navarre;

Argent enté en point, with a pomegranate proper seeded gules, supported, sculpted and leafed in two leaves vert, which was for Granada.

Inescutcheon azure bordure gules, three fleurs-de-lys or, which was for Bourbon-Anjou.

Joined to the shield, the red saltire of Burgundy and, to the dexter and sinister of the base point, the yoke gules in its natural position with ribbons, of the field, and the sheaf of five arrows gules with the arrowheads inverted and ribbons, of the field, which used to be the symbol of the Catholic Monarchs of Spain.

All surrounded by the chain of the Golden Fleece and crowned with a crown of the same metal and precious stones, with eight rosettes, five visible, and eight pearls interspersed, closed at the top by four diadems also adorned with pearls and surmounted by a cross on a globe, which is the crown of the prince.

== See also ==
- Coat of arms of the King of Spain
- Coat of arms of the Prince of Asturias
