= Prince of Spain =

Title bestowed on Juan Carlos de Borbón

- Príncipe de España
- Coat of arms

- Standard

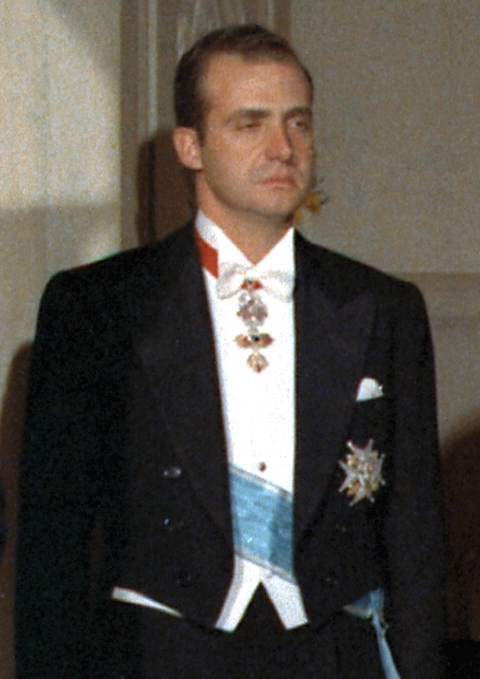
- Juan Carlos de Borbón
- Style: His Royal Highness
- Residence: Palace of Zarzuela
- Appointer: Francisco Franco
- Term length: No fixed term
- Precursor: Prince of Asturias
- Formation: 22 July 1969
- First holder: Juan Carlos de Borbón
- Final holder: Juan Carlos de Borbón
- Abolished: 22 November 1975
- Succession: Prince of Asturias

Prince of Spain (Spanish: Príncipe de España) was the title created by law on 22 July 1969 for Prince Juan Carlos de Borbón, the designated successor of Generalísimo Francisco Franco. Juan Carlos held the title until 22 November 1975, when he became King of Spain following the death of Franco. The title given to the heir-apparent or heir-presumptive to the Spanish throne has since been Prince or Princess of Asturias.

The title was given the associated style of His Royal Highness and the military honours of the Brigadier General of the Army. The design of the coat of arms and the royal standard was regulated by decree on 22 April 1971 for the personal use of the Prince of Spain, not to be confused with an earlier hereditary confirmation by Joseph Bonaparte on his children and grandchildren.

== See also ==
- Law of Succession to the Headship of the State
