= Treaty of Bayonne (1388) =

The Treaty of Bayonne in 1388 ended a conflict over the succession to the crown of Castile. The treaty was signed on 26 October 1388 in Bayonne between King John I of Castile and John of Gaunt, Duke of Lancaster, claimant to the throne of Castile in the right of his wife (jure uxoris).

== Conflict over the succession to the crown of Castile ==
The conflict over the Castilian succession had first arisen over the claims of two half-brothers. These were on the one hand Henry of Trastamara, an illegitimate son of Alfonso XI of Castile from his relationship with his mistress Eleanor de Guzmán, and on the other Peter I (nicknamed The Cruel), a son of Alfonso XI from his marriage to Maria of Portugal.

In 1356, this conflict turned into a civil war. The half-brothers fought for the throne until 1369 when Henry of Trastamara murdered Peter and assumed the crown as Henry II. Henry II wanted to secure his throne for his son and successor John I (1358-1390). However, he was once again threatened by two other rivals who claimed the throne. These were Ferdinand I of Portugal (1345-1383), a great-grandchild of Sancho IV of Castile (through the female line), and John of Gaunt, Duke of Lancaster, married to a daughter of Peter I, Constance.

The treaty of 1388 settled the issue of succession with a marriage between the two opposing candidates for the crown: Henry (a son of John I of Castile and Eleanor of Aragon) and Catherine (a daughter of John of Gaunt and Constance of Castile). The prince and princess were awarded the title of Prince of Asturias, a title that is used from that time on for the heirs to the crown of Castile and afterwards that of Spain. John of Gaunt renounced his claim to the throne in exchange for a compensation of 600,000 gold francs and an annuity of 40,000 gold francs. The treaty also stipulated the release of the children of Peter the Cruel who had been imprisoned.

== Effects on the European relations ==
Europe was exhausted in 1388, tired of the Hundred Years' War and Black Death, and the warring factions were inclined to come to terms. The English had little interest in a Spain allied to France. The French had signed a treaty with Castile on June 12 to assemble a naval expedition against England. On the other hand, France had already negotiated with John of Gaunt in the spring to relinquish its claims to the throne of Castile.

In 1389, the Truce of Leulinghem was concluded between England, France, Castile, Scotland, Burgundy and Portugal. It initiated a period of relative calm in the Hundred Years' War, which lasted until about 1415.
