= Las Labores =

Spanish municipality

Coordinates: 39°16′N 3°31′W

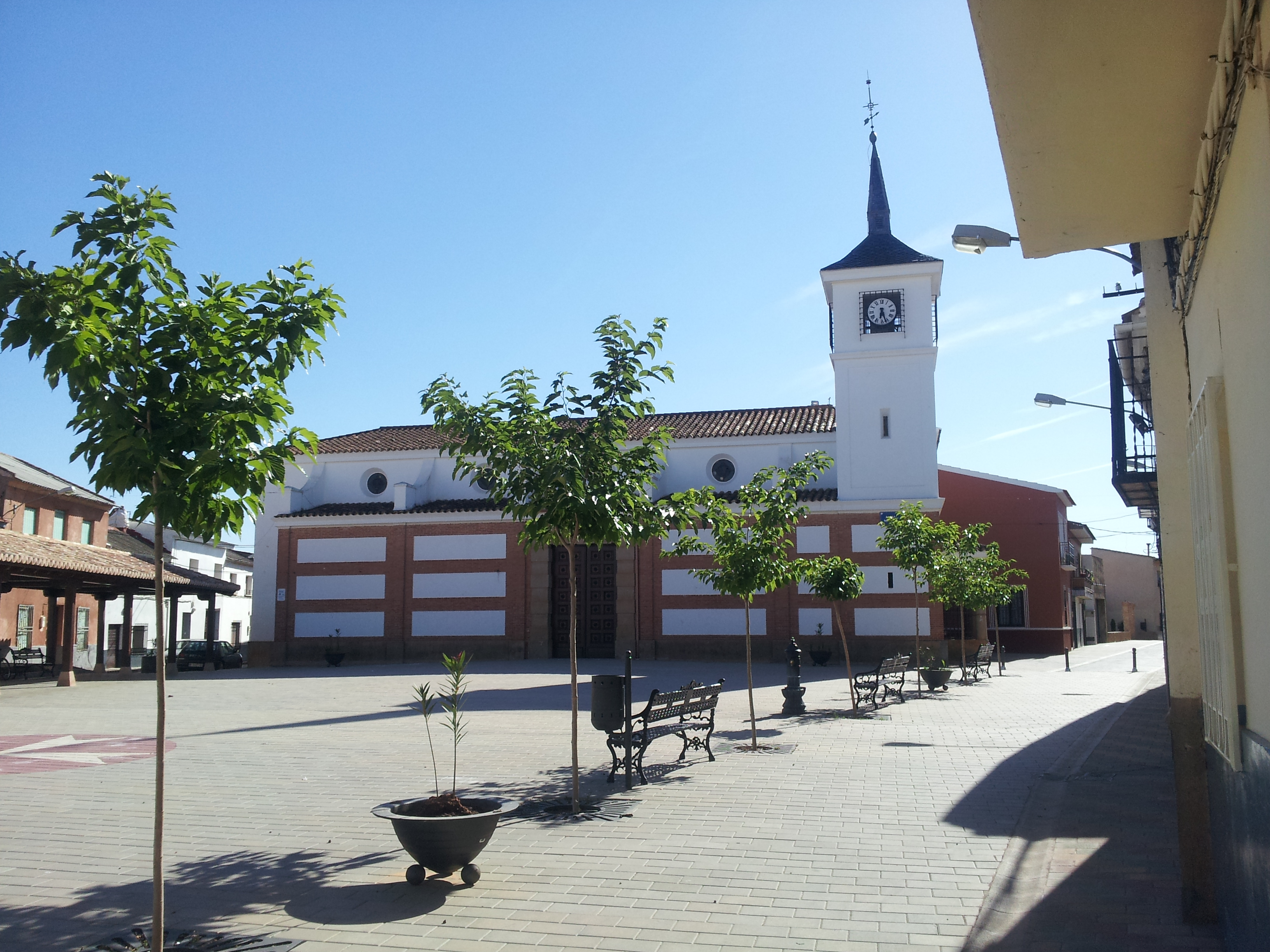
Main Square and Las Labores Church

Flag of Las Labores

Coat of arms of Las Labores

Las Labores is a municipality in Ciudad Real, Castile-La Mancha, Spain. It has a population of 678.

== Location ==
The town of Las Labores is located in the northeast of the province of Ciudad Real. The municipality, which consists of approximately 34 square kilometers, is bordered on the north by Herencia, on the east by Puerto Lápice, on the south by Arenas de San Juan and on the west by Villarrubia de los Ojos .

== History ==
Until the 17th century it was called The Other Houses, since it was born as a hamlet dependent on the town of Arenas de San Juan, but due to the greater health of their land, being further from the beginnings of the Daimiel tables (which avoided contact with stagnant waters), the population that worked these lands began to settle definitively and on January 22, 1843 reached independence. Its formation took place to the having in this place houses of work inhabited by inhabitants of Herencia.

== Economy ==
The economy of Las Labores is based on agriculture and livestock.

The most important crop is that of the vine, to obtain wine, there are two Agrarian Cooperatives dedicated to the creation of wine "Virgen del Sagrario" and "San Isidro Labrador".

The second crop in importance is the olive grove, to obtain olive oil, there is a Cooperative called "San Carlos Borromeo", although they existed in the past, there is currently no private oil mill in the town. Currently the Cooperative sells its oil under the name "Laboreño".

There are several farms, mostly dedicated to raising chickens, as well as pigs, goats and sheep.

In the municipality of Las Labores there is also a factory of spirits products: Pernot Ricard España.
