= Coat of arms of Charles V, Holy Roman Emperor =

Charles V Coat of arms

- Armiger: Charles V
- Adopted: 1519
- Crest: Imperial Crown of the Holy Roman Empire
- Torse: Cross of Burgundy
- Shield: His maternal inheritance quartering his paternal inheritance
- Supporters: Imperial Eagle and the Pillars of Hercules
- Motto: Plus Oultre (Latin translation: Plus Ultra)
- Order: Order of the Golden Fleece

Charles V, Holy Roman Emperor was the heir of several of Europe's leading royal houses. In 1506, he inherited the Burgundian Netherlands, which came from his paternal grandmother, Mary of Burgundy. In 1516, Charles became the king of Spain, inheriting the kingdoms first united by his maternal grandparents, Isabella I of Castile and Ferdinand II of Aragon (the Catholic Monarchs). Finally, on the death of his paternal grandfather in 1519, Maximilian I, Holy Roman Emperor, he inherited the Habsburg lands in central Europe and was elected Holy Roman Emperor.

== Blazon ==
=== Shield ===
Coat of Arms as Heir

Coat of Arms as Prince of Spains, Archduke and Duke of Burgundy

His "Greater Coat of Arms", the most expansive and formal representation of the lands and titles he inherited, is blazoned as follows (here placed in paragraphs for clarity):

- Quarterly:
  - I and IV:
    - Grand-quarterly i and iv:
      - Great-grand-quarterly 1 and 4: Gules, a castle triple-towered or masoned sable and ajouré azure (Castile);
      - 2 and 3: Argent, a lion rampant purpure crowned or langued and armed gules (Leon);
    - ii: per pale:
      - Dexter: per fess:
        - in chief: Or, four pallets gules (Aragon);
        - in base: Gules, a cross saltire and orle of chains linked together or and a centre point vert (Navarre);
      - Sinister: per pale:
        - Dexter: Argent, a cross potent and four crosslets or (Jerusalem);
        - Sinister: Barry of eight gules and argent (Hungary);
    - iii: per pale:
      - Dexter: per fess:
        - in chief: Or, four pallets gules (Aragon);
        - in base: Gules, a cross saltire and orle of chains linked together or and a centre point vert (Navarre);
      - Sinister: per saltire:
        - 1 and 4: Or, four pallets gules (Aragon);
        - 2 and 3: Argent, an eagle displayed sable (Sicily);
  - II and III: Quarterly:
    - i: Gules, a fess argent (Austria (Habsburg (modern) / Babenberg)),
    - ii: Azure semy-de-lis or, a bordure compony argent and gules (Burgundy (modern));
    - iii: Bendy of six or and azure, a bordure gules (Burgundy (ancient));
    - iv: Sable, a lion rampant or langued and armed gules (Brabant);
    - Overall at the fess point of the quarter an inescutcheon: Or, a lion rampant sable armed and langued gules (Flanders); impaling: Argent, an eagle displayed gules armed beaked and langued or (Tyrol);
- Enté en point: Argent, a pomegranate proper seeded gules supported sculpted and slipped vert (Granada).

=== Other elements ===
- Supporters: An eagle with two heads displayed sable imperially crowned proper in front of a saltire ragulée gules the whole between two columns argent issuing from the sea proper in base the one to dexter crowned imperially proper the one to sinister crowned with the Royal Crown of Spain proper;
- Motto: PLUS ULTRA (or PLUS OULTRE) wraps around the columns.

== Personal arms ==
Coat of arms of Charles V of Habsburg as King of the Romans.

Escutcheon, Greater Coat of Arms

Personal Coat of arms

The first and fourth quarters represents holdings derived from the Spanish crowns: that is, the quartered arms of Castile and Leon themselves quartered with the quartered arms of Aragon and Sicily. After 1520 the Aragon/Sicily quartering also incorporated the arms of Jerusalem, Naples, and Navarre.

The second and third quarters represents holdings derived from Charles's Austrian and Burgundian inheritance: these quarters shows further quartering of Austria, Duchy of Burgundy, House of Valois-Burgundy, and the Duchy of Brabant, with the escutcheon in the middle showing Flanders on the left and Tyrol on the right.

The Granada pomegranate is represented at the bottom between the two.

== Features ==
First and Fourth Quarters
First and Fourth Grand-quarters
Second Grand-quarter

Arms	Meaning	Details
	Kingdom of Castile	1st and 4th great-grand-quarters Gules, a three towered castle Or, masoned sable and ajouré azure
	Kingdom of León	2nd and 3rd great-grand-quarters Argent, a lion rampant purpure(sometimes blazoned gules) crowned Or, langued and armed gules
Third Grand-quarter
	Crown of Aragon	Dexter chief Or, four pallets gules
	Kingdom of Navarre	Dexter base Gules, a cross, saltire and orle of chains linked together Or, a centre point vert
	Kingdom of Sicily	Sinister side Party per Saltire, Or four pallets gules and Argent an eagle displayed sable (Manfred of Sicily)

Arms	Meaning	Details
	Crown of Aragon	Dexter chief Or, four pallets gules
	Kingdom of Navarre	Dexter base Gules, a cross, saltire and orle of chains linked together Or, a centre point vert
	Kingdoms of Jerusalem and Hungary	Sinister side Party per pale Argent, a cross potent and four crosslets Or (Kingdom of Jerusalem) and Barry of eight Gules and Argent (Kingdom of Hungary), the whole representing the arms of the Kingdom of Naples, as show in the arms of his grandfather Ferdinand II of Aragon as King of Naples.

Second and Third Quarters

Arms	Meaning	Details
	Austria (Habsburg (modern) / Babenberg)	1st grand-quarter Gules a fess Argent
	Second Capetian house of Burgundy (Burgundy "modern")	2nd grand-quarter azure semy de lis or, a bordure compony gules and argent
	Duchy of Burgundy (Burgundy "ancient")	3rd grand-quarter bendy of six or and azure a bordure gules

Arms	Meaning	Details
	Duchy of Brabant	4th grand-quarter Sable, a lion rampant Or, langued and armed gules
Escutcheon
	County of Flanders	Dexter; Or, a lion rampant of Sable, langued and armed gules
	County of Tyrol	Sinister; Argent an eagle displayed gules, armed, beaked, and langued Or

Enté en point

Arms	Meaning	Details
	Kingdom of Granada	enté en point Argent, a pomegranate proper seeded gules, supported, sculpted and leafed in two leaves vert.

External ornaments

Arms	Meaning	Details
	Double-headed eagle (Reichsadler of the Holy Roman Empire)	Imperial Eagle; Double-headed eagle displayed Sable
	Cross of Burgundy (Duchy of Burgundy)	Mantling blazoned Argent, a saltire ragulée gules.

Arms	Meaning	Details
	Pillars of Hercules	Supporters an ancient name given to the Strait of Gibraltar. The personal motto of the Monarch was Plus oultre, in French, translated as plus ultra in Latin especially for the Spanish areas, and means 'further beyond'. A German version, Noch Weiterer, was rarely used.
	Imperial crown of the Holy Roman Empire	Crown; Charles's crown as Charles V, Holy Roman Emperor
	Golden Fleece	Collar; Order of chivalry founded in 1430 by Duke Philip III of Burgundy to celebrate his marriage to the Portuguese princess Isabel of Aviz.

== The Burgundian Inheritance and the Order of the Golden Fleece ==
In 1477, the territory of the Duchy of Burgundy had been conquered and annexed by France. In the same year, Mary "the Rich", the last Burgundian duke's only child, had married Charles' grandfather Maximilian, giving the Habsburgs control of the remainder of the Burgundian Inheritance: although the territory of the Duchy of Burgundy itself remained in the hands of France, the Habsburgs remained in control of the title of Duke of Burgundy and the other parts of the Burgundian inheritance, notably the Low Countries and the Free County of Burgundy in the Holy Roman Empire. They often used the term Burgundy to refer to it until the late 18th century, when the Austrian Netherlands were lost to the French Republic. Although Charles V had inherited the grand mastership of numerous orders, the only order which he habitually wore and awarded was that of the Burgundian Order of the Golden Fleece.

== Gallery ==
Coat of Arms of Charles when he was Duke of Burgundy and King of Navarre, Castile and Aragon (Version with motto and supporters)	Alternative design for the Greater Coat of Arms (1530-1556)
Or shield version	Variant used as Monarch of Naples
