= Coat of arms of the Prince of Asturias =

- Armiger: Leonor, Princess of Asturias
- Adopted: 30 October 2015
- Crest: Crown of the Princess of Asturias
- Shield: Quarterly: Castile, León, Aragon, and Navarre; enté en point, Granada; inescutcheon Bourbon (Anjou Branch); the whole differenced by a label azure.
- Order: Order of the Golden Fleece
- Earlier version: See below

The blazon of the coat of arms of the Princess of Asturias is given by a Royal Decree 979 on 30 October 2015 which was an amendment of the Royal Decree 1511 dated Madrid 21 January 1977, which also created her guidon (military personal ensign) and her standard.

== Official blazon ==
The shield is divided into four quarters, blazoned as follows:

- 1st, Gules a castle three-towered Or, masoned Sable ajoure, (door and windows) Azure, for Castile;
- 2nd, Argent a lion rampant Purpure, armed Gules and crowned Or, for León;
- 3rd, Or four pallets Gules, for Aragon;
- 4th, Gules a cross, saltire and orle of chains all linked Or, an emerald Proper, for Navarre;
- Enté en point, Argent a pomegranate Proper seeded Gules, supported, sculpted and leafed in two leaves Vert, for Granada;
- Inescutcheon, Azure with three fleurs-de-lys Or, bordured Gules, for Bourbon.

The whole is differenced by a label of three points Azure, the difference used by heirs apparent to the Spanish House of Habsburg.

The shield is surmounted by a closed crown, which is a circle of gold, inset with precious stones of their colours, composed of eight rosettes of acanthus leaves, of which five are visible, interspersed by pearls in their colour, issuing from which are four pearl diadems, of which three are visible, which converge in a blue orb, with gold semi-meridian and equator, surmounted by a gold cross, the crown lined with red and surrounded by the collar of the Golden Fleece.

== History ==
Historical Arms of Princes and Princesses of Asturias
Arms	Dates	Details
	1388–1468	The arms used in the 13th and 14th century by the Prince of Asturias, and the others heirs apparent to the Castilian Throne before the title was adopted, were the undifferenced Royal Arms. However, the Infantes used differenced arms.
	1468–1474	Princess Isabella (Isabella I as Queen of Castile) used the undifferenced Castilian Royal Arms and added the Saint John the Evangelist's Eagle, an eagle "displayed" as single supporter. In 1473 the Princess Isabella's seal bearing her arms without crest and the St John the Evangelist's Eagle.
	1478–1497	On the tomb of John, Prince of Asturias and Girona in St Thomas's Royal Monastery, sculpted by Domenico Fancelli, is shown the undifferenced Catholic Monarchs's coat of arms without crest supported by the St John the Evangelist's Eagle and two putti frequently used as sculptural decoration but not prominently heraldic supporters in Spanish royal heraldry.
1506–1516		When the House of Habsburg inherited the Crowns of Castile and Aragon marks of Cadency – a label of three points – were added to the heirs apparent's arms, as was usual in the heraldry of many European monarchies. Prince Charles (Charles I as King of Spain and Charles V as Holy Roman Emperor) used his father's arms – A quartered shield, depicting Austria, new Burgundy, old Burgundy, Brabant and Flanders on an escutcheon – with a label argent. These arms were not used as Prince of Asturias because Prince Charles did not add the arms of Castile and Aragon.
	1528–1556	Prince Philip (Philip II as King of Spain and Philip I of Portugal) used his father's arms differenced with a label argent or azure. The Prince Philip's arms are shown on many Prince's armours. Now these armours have been kept at the Royal Armoury in the Royal Palace of Madrid. Sometimes, Philip also used the undifferenced arms of his father.
	1560–1568	In 1568 Prince Carlos, the eldest son of Philip II, died and an Ambrosio Morales's report for the Prince's sepulchre said his arms were the Royal Arms but with "a label azure with its three short points". Prince Carlos also used the royal arms differenced with a label argent.
	1584–1598	Prince Philip (Philip III as King of Spain and Philip II of Portugal) sometimes used a new label argent variant wavy azure.
	1608–1665	The eldest son of Philip III, Prince Philip (Philip IV as King of Spain and Philip III of Portugal), used the Royal Arms with label argent or azure. Philip's son, Prince Balthasar Charles also bore the same differences.
	1707–1761; 1761–1931	The shields of the House of Bourbon's heirs apparent hardly ever depicted differences. Chronicler King of Arms Juan José Vilar y Psayla (1830–1894) said the arms of the Prince of Asturias were differentiated by a crown of four-half-arches, the Spanish monarch's crown has eight-half-arches since the reign of Philip V (1700–1746).
1971-1975; 1977-2001 (De facto without use)		Further information: Coat of arms of the Prince of Spain
	2001–2014	The coat of arms used by the future King Felipe VI as Prince of Asturias had the royal arms of Spain differenced by a label of three points Azure, this recovered difference has been used by heirs apparent to the Spanish House of Habsburg. Prince Felipe's coat of arms was adopted by the Royal Decree 284 dated Madrid 16 March 2001, which also created his Guidon and Standard.

== See also ==
- Coat of arms of the King of Spain
- Coat of arms of the Prince of Spain
- Coat of arms of Spain
- Royal Standard of Spain
- Coat of arms of the Prince of Wales

== Notes ==
- On sepulchres of Habsburg Princes of Asturias who didn't ascend to the throne their coats of arms are the undifferenced Lesser Royal Arms (Quarterly, 1 and 4 Castile, 2 and 3 León), with a crown closed with four-half-arches in crest. The Pantheon of the Princes of the Royal Seat of El Escorial was completed in 1888, in the nineteenth century the heir to the Spanish throne used Royal Arms differentiated by a crown of four-half-arches.
