= Cross of Burgundy =

Historical banner and battle flag

Cross of Burgundy

The Cross of Burgundy (French: Croix de Bourgogne; Spanish: Cruz de Borgoña/Aspa de Borgoña; German: Burgunderkreuz; Italian: Croce di Borgogna; Dutch: Bourgondisch kruis; Portuguese: Cruz de Borgonha) is a saw-toothed (raguly) form of the Cross of Saint Andrew, the patron saint of Burgundy, and a historical banner and battle flag used by holders of the title of Duke of Burgundy and their subjects.

It was first used in the 15th century by the Valois Dukes of Burgundy, who ruled a large part of nowadays eastern France and the Low Countries as an effectively independent state. At the extinction of the Valois ducal line in 1477, the Burgundian Low Countries were inherited by the Habsburgs, who retained the title of Dukes of Burgundy and adopted the flag as one of the many symbols of their dynasty. After the Burgundian Habsburgs ascended to the throne of Spain in 1506, their officials introduced this ensign in the Spanish Empire throughout the Castilian and Aragonese territories in Europe and in the Americas. As a reflection of the historical reach of the Burgundian, Habsburg, and Spanish empires and territories, the emblem can be found in several countries in Europe and in the Americas, used on regimental colours, badges, shoulder patches, and company guidons.

More recent usage of the Cross of Burgundy include its use by the Carlists, a faction of traditional monarchists who were opposed to the ascension of Isabella II in 1833. Carlists and their Requeté militias would be a major group among the Spanish Nationalists under the rule of Francisco Franco. After the fall of Franco, Carlism shifted to a left-winged nationalist group.

The Cross of Burgundy was also used by the Walloon Legion French-speaking Belgian volunteers fighting for Nazi Germany affiliated with the Rexism.

== History ==
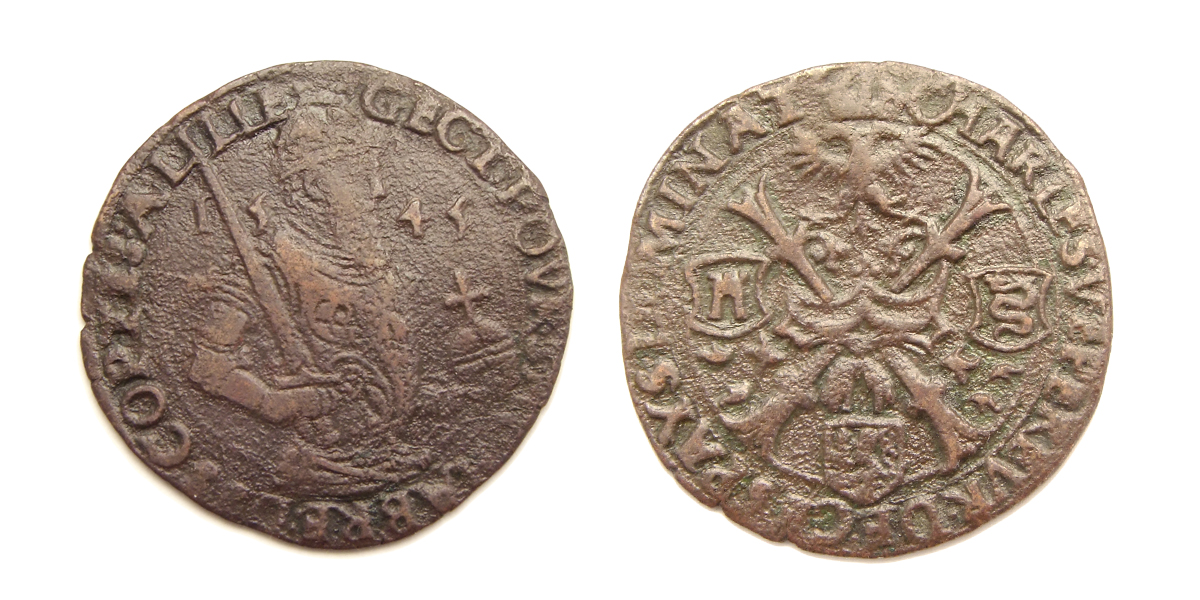
Jeton of the Chamber of Accounts in Lille, 1545. Struck under Emperor Charles V, showing a Burgundian steel superimposed on Burgundian Cross.

=== Burgundy ===
The banner strictly speaking dates to the early 15th century when the supporters of the Duke of Burgundy adopted the badge to show allegiance in the Armagnac–Burgundian Civil War. It represents the cross on which Andrew the Apostle was crucified. The design is a red saltire resembling two crossed, roughly-pruned, branches on a white field. In heraldic language, it may be blazoned argent, a saltire ragulée (or raguly) gules.

Military flag of the Burgundian State during the reign of Charles the Bold

Pedro de Ayala, writing in the 1490s, claims a previous Duke of Burgundy first adopted this emblem to honour his Scottish soldiers. This must be a reference to the Scottish soldiers recruited by John the Fearless in the first years of the fifteenth century, led by the Earl of Mar and Earl of Douglas. However, earlier chronicle claims and archaeological finds of heraldic badges from Paris indicate widespread adoption dates from 1411 in the context of factional warfare in the city. It was more likely to have been adopted because St. Andrew was the patron saint of the dukes of Burgundy.

=== Habsburgs and Spain ===
Coat of arms of Juan Carlos I, King of Spain (1975–2014), with the Cross of Burgundy as a supporter.

The year 1506 is the earliest use in Spain as it made an appearance on the standards carried by Philip the Handsome's Burgundian life guards. Philip was Duke of Burgundy since 1482. After marrying Joanna of Castile, Philip became the first Habsburg King of Spain and used the Cross of Burgundy as an emblem. It was the symbol of the house of his mother, Mary of Burgundy.

From 1519 to 1556, during the reign of Philip and Joanna's son, Emperor Charles V, who was King Charles I of Spain since 1516 and Duke Charles II of Burgundy since 1506, various armies within his empire used the flag with the Cross of Burgundy over different fields. It was one of the many Habsburg symbols and the right to use it was inherited by Philip II of Spain together with the Burgundian territories. The official field was still white. The Spanish Habsburgs and their successors of the House of Bourbon continued to use the Cross of Burgundy in various forms, including as a supporter to the Royal Coat of Arms. From the time of the Bourbon king Philip V (1700–1746), the Spanish naval ensign was white and bore a royal coat of arms in the centre. The Burgundian flag was reportedly still flown as a jack ensign, that is, as a secondary flag, until Charles III introduced his new red-yellow-red naval ensign in 1785. It also remained in use in Spain's overseas empire.

The flag eventually came to be adopted by the Carlists, a traditionalist-legitimist movement which fought three wars of succession against Isabella II of Spain. They claimed the throne of Spain for Carlos, who would have been the legal heir under the Salic Law, which had been controversially abolished by Ferdinand VII. In the First Carlist War (1833–1840), however, the Burgundian banner was used as a banner of the Regent Queen's standing Army rather than that of the Carlist. After 1843 the red Burgundian saltire was repeatedly used the new red-yellow army flag under a four-quartered Castilian and Leonese coat of arms on the central yellow fess. During the 20th-century Spanish Civil War the Cross of Burgundy was used as a badge by the Carlists under the leadership of Manuel Fal Condé, who fought on the side of the Nationalists led by Francisco Franco.

== Examples of use of the emblem ==
Burgundian Cross of Burgundy, with crown, firesteel, and Golden Fleece

Users mostly have some direct or indirect relation to the historical Burgundy, though such connection can be very vague and lost in the mists of time. Owing to the impact of the Spanish Empire as a global powerhouse across the world, numerous flags and coats of arms of bodies, in various colours and in combination with other symbols can be found in old Spanish domains. Most of them have a direct link with the Spanish Empire, where this symbol had a global impact.

=== In Spain ===
- A Biscayan merchant ensign (inclusive of the so-called Consulate of Bilbao) (c. 1511–1830)
- A pre-1785 general Spanish merchant and privateering flag
- The Spanish Carlist Flag, from the Spanish Civil War (1936–1939) up to the present
- The third co-official Flag of Spain during the Francoist regime (1937–1977)
- The third co-official flag used by several neo-Nazi, neo-fascist, white supremacist and ultranationalist groups in Spain alongside 1871–1918/1935–45 German Reichskriegsflagge and Confederate "rebel flag"
- In Spain some local flags and coats of arms display the cross of Burgundy in Navarre (Tafalla, etc.), Aragón (Huesca and Lidón), Andalusia (Bujalance), Castile-La Mancha (Las Labores) and Catalonia (Creixell).
- A Basque Nationalist flag (for instance that of the Basque Alpinists in 1921–1978: Green Cross of Burgundy on white edged with red border)
- The Cross of Burgundy was used as a supporter in the coat of arms of the Spanish monarchy during the reign of Juan Carlos I.
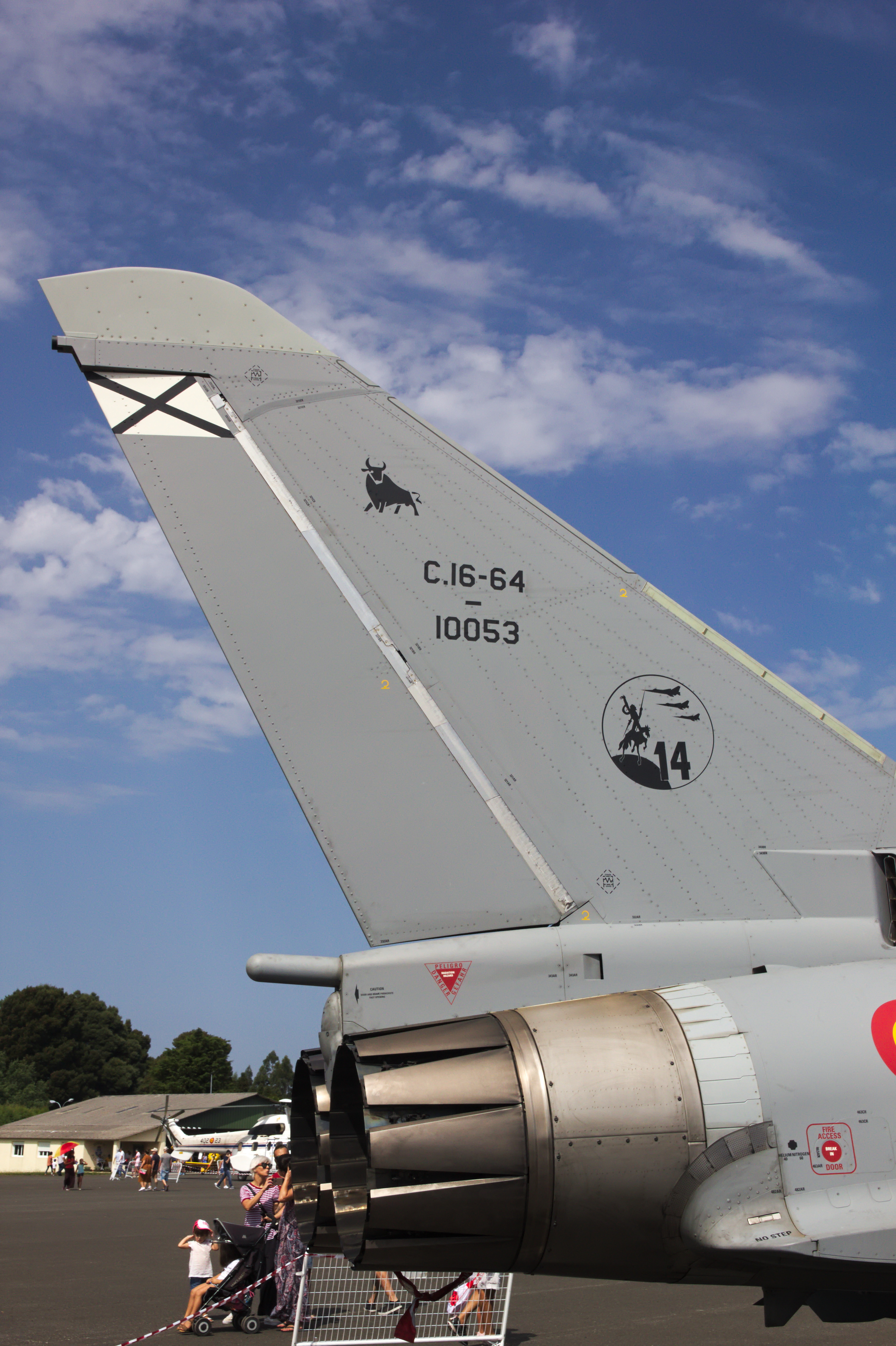
  The Cross of Burgundy used as the fin flash of a Spanish Air Force Eurofighter Typhoon.
- The current fin flash on all the aircraft from the Spanish Armed Forces except the ones in the Navy, is a simplified, monochromed version of the Cross of Burgundy lacking the saw teeth.
- The Cross of Burgundy is present in many of the symbols of the units of the Spanish Army, being the coat of arms of the 6th Paratroopers Brigade "Almogávares" one example among many others.
- The flag of the Maestranza de Caballería de Castilla

=== In France ===
- A French army colour
  - Of the two line infantry regiments raised in the Franche-Comté of Burgundy: "Bourgogne" and "Royal-Comtois", both units raised in the late 17th century, together with the Household cavalry companies "Gendarmes Bourguignons" and "Chevaux Légers Bourguignons" and the Dijon, Autun, Vesoul and Salins provincial militia regiments
  - In the 1870 Franco-Prussian War, the militia "gardes mobiles" from Dijon wore a red Burgundian saltire on their left cuff or shoulder)
- Continuing Burgundian and "Comtois" regionalism in France is keen on the Cross of Burgundy
- The coat of arms of the French commune of Villers-Buzon bears a sort of yellow or white Burgundian saltire on a wider red saltire
- The new (2015) region of Bourgogne-Franche-Comté does not use the Cross of Burgundy in its flag

=== In Belgium and the Austrian Netherlands ===
- The Austrian Netherlands' ensign in 1781–1786 was a black double-headed eagle on a red Burgundian saltire over a background of red over white over yellow
- As a Rexist Walloon Belgian Ultra-Right-wing flag and badge since 1940, including the Walloon Legion in German service on the Russian front, a unit eventually transferred to the Waffen-SS in 1943 (a red Cross of Burgundy, either on white or black)
- As the merchant ensign and badge of the Ostend Company (Austrian Netherlands) in 1717–1731
- The local flag and coat of arms of Philippeville (Belgium) bears a yellow Burgundian saltire on blue.
- The current Belgian naval ensign, which dates from 1950, may well be an homage to the cross of Burgundy

=== In the Netherlands ===
- The Military William Order, the foremost Dutch military decoration since 1815, bears a white Maltese cross and a green Burgundian saltire
- A similar style flag was used by the Seventeen Provinces of the Netherlands in the 15th and 16th centuries.
- The flag of the Dutch municipality of Eijsden bears a red Burgundian saltire since 1966 (same for the municipal coat of arms or crest), also as a heritage of Burgundy.

=== In North, Central and South America ===
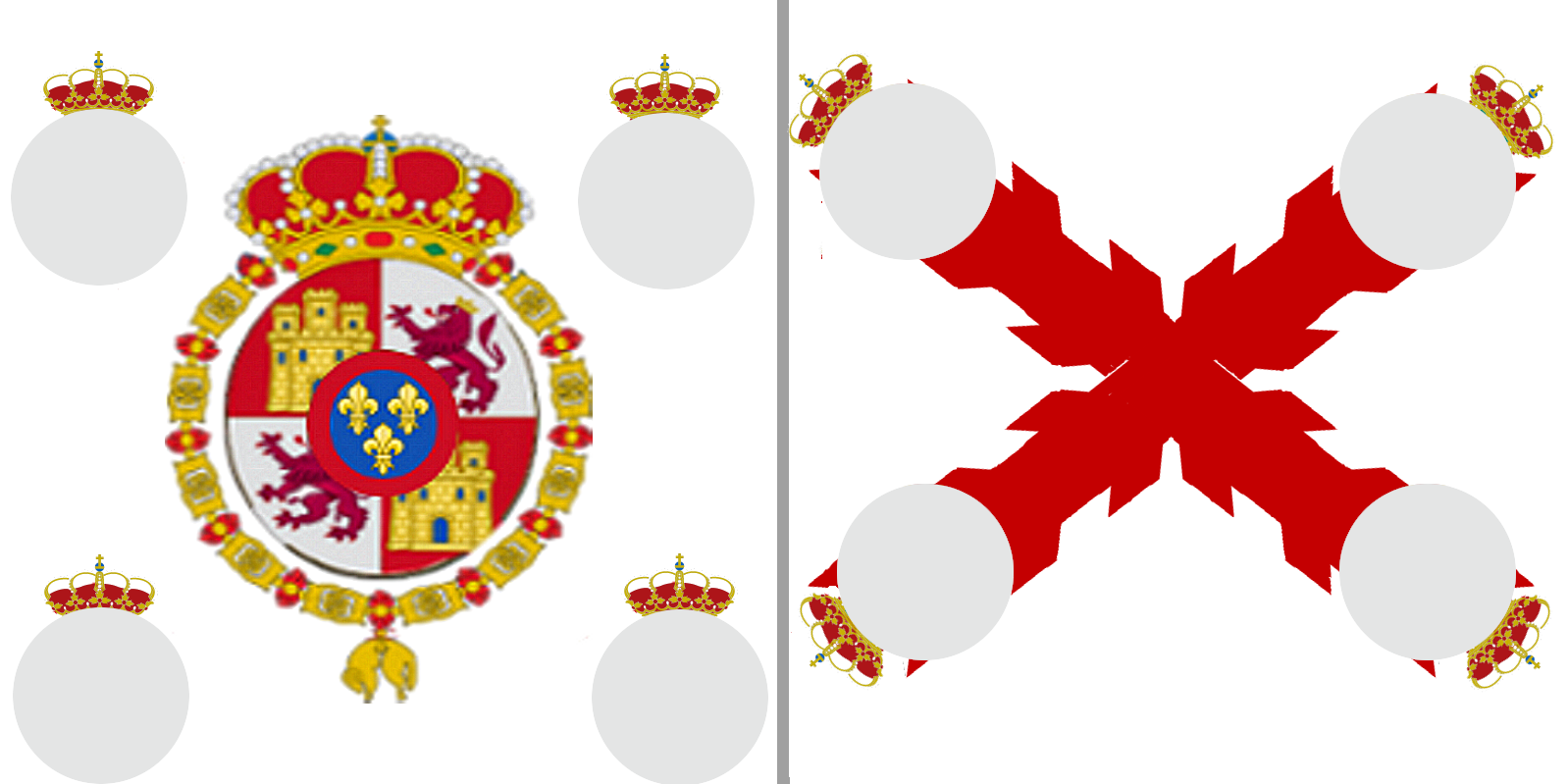
Banner of the foot regiments of the Spanish army: "Coronela" (King's Colour) with the Royal Crest of Spain (carried by the first battalion), and "Ordenanza" or "Sencilla" (Battalion's Colour) with the Burgundian cross (carried by the second and third battalions); with four little coats-of-arms of the place for which it is named. If the battalions were merged by any reason, the Coronela and Sencilla flags could be joined in a sole flag with the Royal Crest over the saltire. The flags with the Royal Crest of Ferdinand VII were used by the Spaniards in the Peninsular War and in the Spanish American wars of independence.

During the Spanish colonisation of the Americas the Cross of Burgundy served as the flag of the Viceroyalties of the New World (Bandera de Ultramar') and as a recurrent symbol in the flags of the Spanish armed forces and the Spanish Navy. Nations that were once part of the Spanish Empire consider "las aspas de Borgoña" to be a historical flag, particularly appropriate for museum exhibits and the remains of the massive harbour-defense fortifications built in the 17th–18th centuries. At both San Juan National Historic Site in Puerto Rico, and at Castillo de San Marcos National Monument in St. Augustine, Florida, the Cross of Burgundy is daily flown over the historic forts, built by Spain to defend their lines of communication between the territories of their New World empire. The flying of this flag reminds people today of the impact Spain and its military had on world history for over 400 years. It was also used by Spanish military forces.

- In present-day Bolivia the Cross of Burgundy (defaced with a golden crown in the center) is the official flag of the department of Chuquisaca. Some units of the Bolivian Armed Forces also adopted the Cross of Burgundy on their flags.
- The Flag of Valdivia, which is composed of a red saltire on a white field is thought to have originated from the Spanish Cross of Burgundy, as the city of Valdivia in southern Chile was a very important stronghold of the Spanish Empire.
- The Cross of Burgundy appears on the coats of arms of the Chilean cities of Talca and Osorno.
- The Cross of Burgundy was used by right-wing nationalist, Hispanista, Monarchist and anti-Republican groups in Peru following the election of left-wing candidate Pedro Castillo

=== In the United States ===
- The flags of Alabama and Florida each include a red saltire representing the cross of St. Andrew, deriving from the Cross of Burgundy used during Spanish colonial periods.

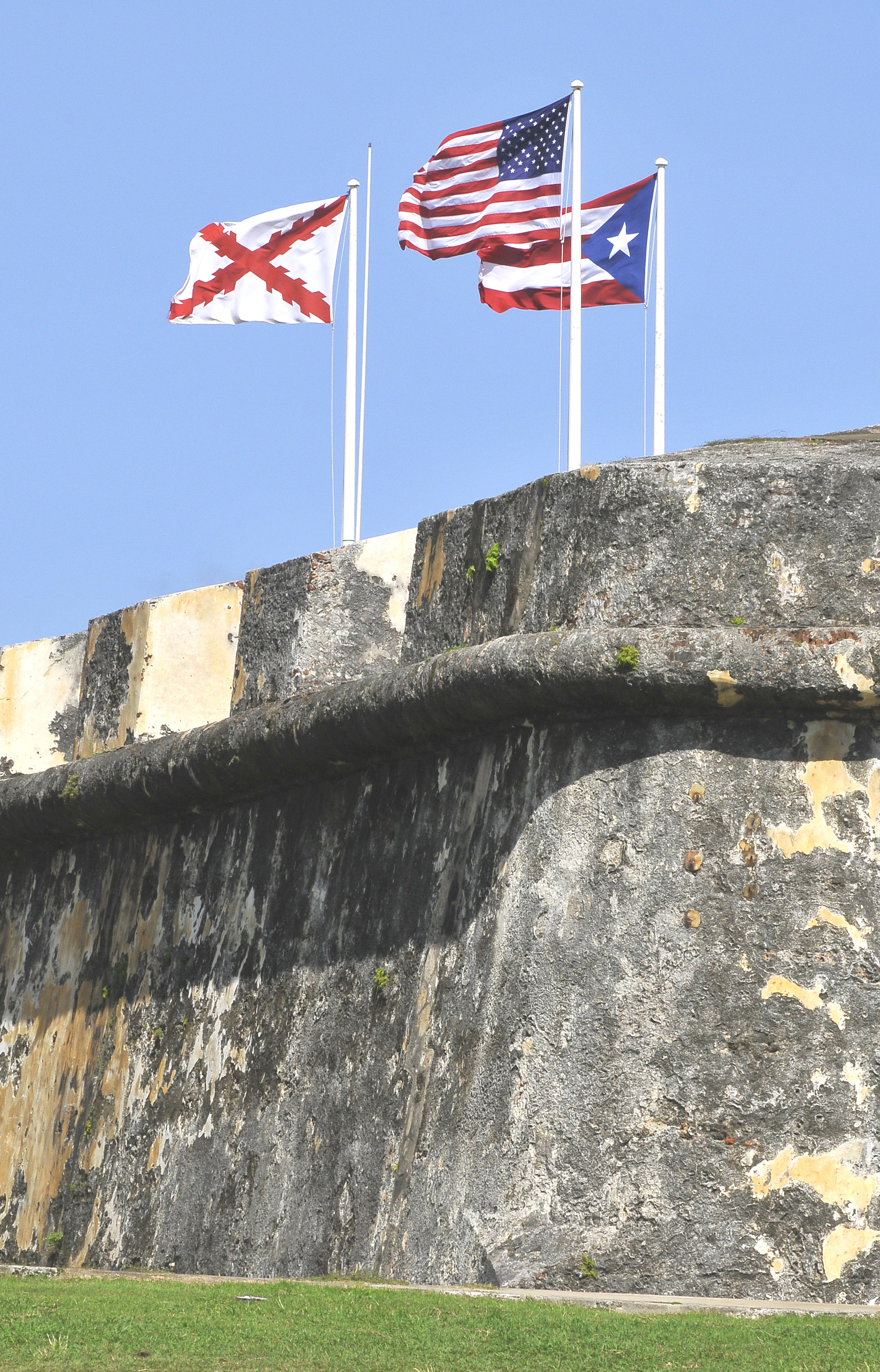
Cross of Burgundy alongside La Monoestrellada of Puerto Rico and the Stars and Stripes of the United States on Castillo San Felipe del Morro

- The Cross of Burgundy is still flown at former Spanish fortifications such as Fort San Cristóbal and Fort San Felipe del Morro in San Juan, Puerto Rico, as well as the Castillo de San Marcos and Fort Matanzas in St. Augustine, Florida.

== Gallery ==
Flag of the Quito Revolution, a rebellion against Spanish authorities in Ecuador, where a flag with a reversed Cross of Burgundy was raised.

Coronela flag of the Spanish Tercios Morados Viejos Tercios division (old murrey or purpure)

Banner of the Burgundian Cross of Burgundy with firesteel and Golden Fleece.

Cross of Burgundy in red over a white flag was a flag of Carlism and Requetés during Francoist Spain. (note: see the coat of arms of the king)

Flag and royal standard of New Spain.

The flag of Florida, which may be based on the Cross of Burgundy

Royal Coat of arms of Spain; Common Version of the Standard Colours (1700–1761)	Royal Coat of arms of Spain; Common Version of the Standard Colours (1761–1843)

Coat of arms of Spain – Version of the Standard Colours (1843–1868, 1874–1931); Variant with the lesser royal arms quarters	Coat of arms of Spain – Version of the Standard Colours (1871/1873); Reign of King Amadeo	Coat of arms of Spain – Version of the Standard Colours (1874–1931); Variant with the national quarters	Coat of arms of Spain; Royal Standard and the Royal Guard Colours (1974–2014); Reign of King Juan Carlos I

== See also ==
- History of Spain
- Burgundy (disambiguation)
- Reichskriegsflagge
- Saint Patrick's Flag
- Vexillology
