= Royal standard of Spain =

Official flag of Spanish monarchs

The Royal Standard of Spain

The Royal Standard (Spain) (Estandarte Real or Estandarte del Rey) is the official flag of the King of Spain. It comprises a crimson square, traditional colour of both Castilian and Spanish monarchs, with the coat of arms of the King in the center. It is raised over the official royal residence in Madrid, the Palacio de la Zarzuela and other Spanish royal sites, when the monarch is in residence and displayed on his official car as small flag. The current flag was adopted when Felipe VI acceded the throne as King of Spain on 19 June 2014. The Royal Standard is regulated by Rule 2 of Royal Decree 527/2014, 20 June, an amendment to Title II of Spanish Royal Decree 1511/1977 adopting Flags, Standards, Guidons, Insignia and Emblems Regulation.

== The Royal Guidon ==
Royal guidon since 2014

The Royal Guidon (Guión), the military personal ensign, was also adopted on 19 June 2014. It is described by Rule 1 of Royal Decree 527/2014, an amendment to Title II, Rule 1 of Spanish Royal Decree 1511/1977.

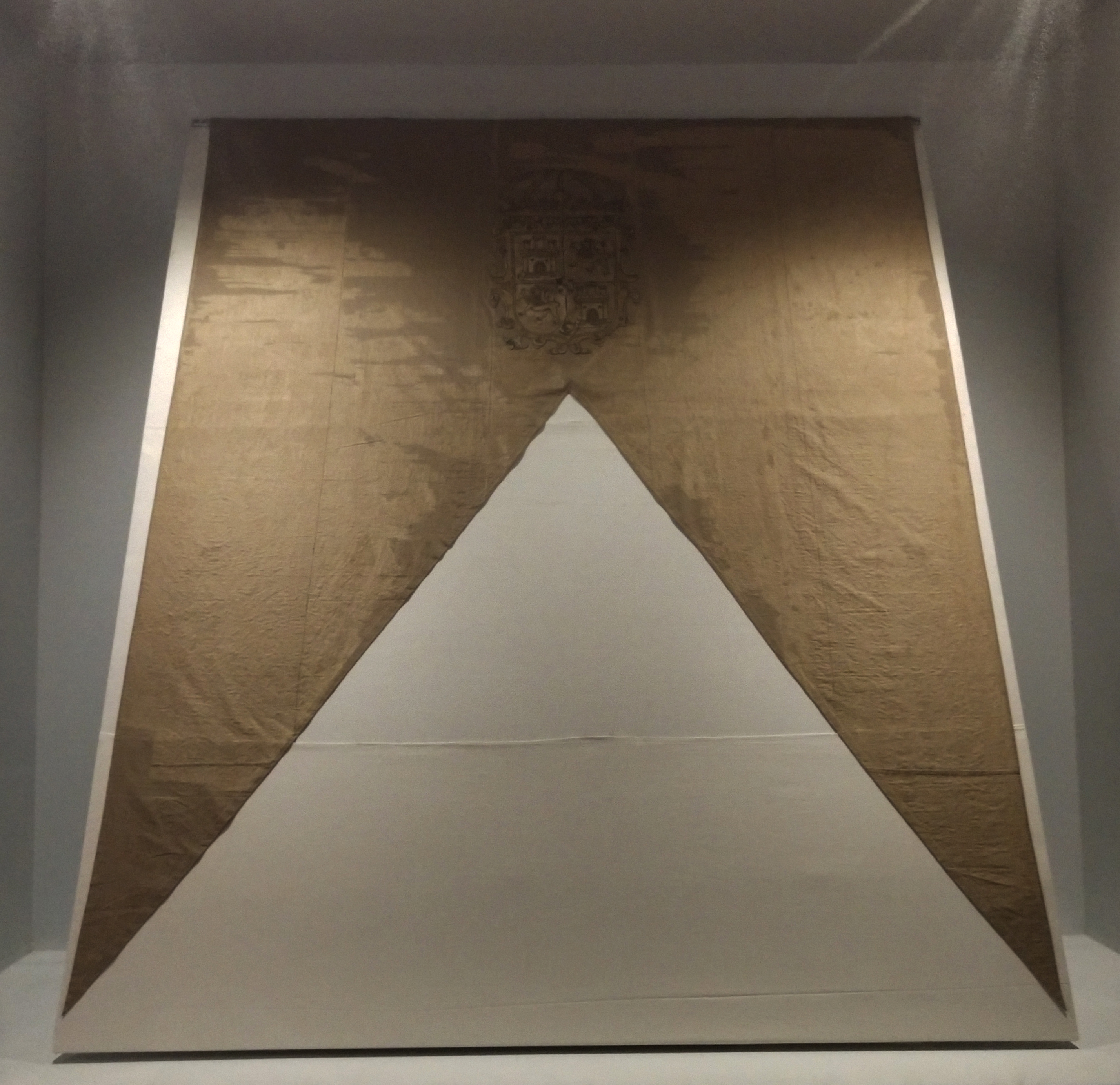
A historical royal standard used in the viceroyalty of New Spain.

It is similar to the Royal Standard except the Royal Guidon has a gold surround. It is made of silk's taffeta and measures 80 x 80 cm in size. It is the personal command sign or positional flag of the monarch and traditionally was carried with him. The proportions of the coat of arms are smaller than on the standard.

== Historical standards, guidons and banners of arms of Spanish monarchs ==
The heraldic standard, also known as the pendón real, has been, as in other European monarchies, the personal flag of the Spanish monarchs and has been used in events of greater solemnity. It was formed by the elements of the monarch's shield without the exterior adornments and has not recovered since its disappearance in 1931.

The royal standard is the personal banner of the monarch. The guidon, of military use, was formed from the reign of Philip II by the same elements of the standard but incorporating the Cross of Burgundy, a fringe and a cordoncillo. During the period of the House of Austria, the Cross of Burgundy did not appear frequently in the royal standard. The Catholic Monarchs and Charles I (as monarchs of Castile) used the guidon of the Castilian monarchs, the Banda de Castilla which was a square flag of crimson color in which there was a band between two dragons. The Catholic Monarchs included in the Band of Castile the yoke and arrows which were replaced with the Columns of Hercules during the reign of Charles I. Fernando the Catholic also used the guidon that corresponded to him as monarch of Aragon. The Catholic Monarchs also frequently used, since 1492, a banner that consisted of a white cloth with their coat of arms.

=== Evolution ===
- The Banner is the ceremonial ensign of the monarch and the royal standard or royal flag is his ensign for public use.
- From Philip II's reign the Royal Guidon was the same as the royal standard or royal flag with a cross of Burgundy and gold surround.

The Banners of Arms
Banner of Arms	Dates	Details
	1475–1506	The banner of arms of the Catholic Monarchs, Isabella I of Castile and Ferdinand II of Aragon, whose marriage unified Spain, were on a crimson background: Quarterly, 1 and 4. quarterly Castile-León, 2 and 3. per pale Aragon and Aragon-Sicily. After the 1492 Conquest of Granada, the kingdom was represented in the Royal Arms by the addition enté en point of Granada's arms. The heraldic banner has long been used by the Catholic Monarchs as their military ensign.
	1518–1556	In 1504, Archduke Philip the Handsome (King of Castile and Leon by marriage with Joanna) immediately staked his claim to her inheritance by quartering his own arms with those of the Catholic Monarchs, the Spanish quarters were given precedence over his. Hence the arrangement became, quarterly: 1. and 4. grand quarters, quarterly: A. and D. quarterly Castile-León, B. and C. per pale Aragon-Sicily, the grand quarter enté en point for Granada; 2. and 3. grand quarters, quarterly Austria, Burgundy ancient, Burgundy modern, Brabant, with an escutcheon per pale Flanders and Tyrol. In 1518 their son Charles I of Spain (Charles V as Holy Roman Emperor) adopted a banner of arms that comprised these arms on a crimson background. The arms were crowned with the old royal crown (an open crown). After his election as Holy Roman Emperor in 1519 Charles used more often the imperial banner: A shield with his own arms surmounting a black double-headed eagle on a golden background.
	1580–1668	During the reign of King Phillip II the arms of the Spanish Monarchy become fixed for the remainder of the House of Austria. Originally Philip II used the simplified arms as devised for his father, namely per fess with the Spanish quarters in chief and the Austrian quarters in base. After the dynastic union with Portugal in 1580, the arms of the Monarchy became per fess, in chief per pale, A. quarterly Castile and Leon, B. per pale Aragon and Aragon-Sicily, the whole enté en point Granada and with an escutcheon of Portugal on the honor point; in base quarterly Austria, Burgundy ancient, Burgundy modern and Brabant, with an escutcheon (in the nombril point) per pale Flanders and Tyrol.
	1668–1700	Even though Portugal and its possessions were lost in 1640, the Spanish kings retained the use of the Portuguese arms as arms of pretence until 1668.
	1700–1761	The arms of Bourbon-Anjou were added in 1700 when Phillip V became king of Spain. He introduced changes in the royal arms of Spain. The king's new arms were designed by the French heraldist Clairambault in November 1700, and were as follows: Per fess: 1. per pale, quarterly Castile and Aragon, enté en point Granada, and per pale, Aragon and Aragon-Sicily; 2. Quarterly, Austria, Burgundy ancient, Burgundy modern and Brabant; enté en point, per pale Flanders and Tyrol. Overall an escutcheon Anjou.
	1761–1868; 1875–1931	In 1761 Charles III modified the arms as follows: Quarterly of six (in three rows of two each): 1. per pale Aragon and Aragon-Sicily; 2. per pale Austria and Burgundy modern; 3. Farnese 4. Medici; 5. Burgundy ancient; 6. Brabant; enté en point per pale Flanders and Tyrol. Overall an escutcheon quarterly of Castile and León enté en point of Granada, overall Anjou. The royal arms were removed by the revolution of 1868. When the Bourbons were restored with Alfonso XII, a decree (8 January 1875) recovered the coat of arms (and the banner of arms) as it stood until 29 September 1868 as personal arms. In 1930 Alfonso XIII, substituted the Aragon quarter with Jerusalem. The Spanish Monarch hasn't used a Banner of Arms since 14 April 1931, when the Second Spanish Republic was proclaimed.

Royal Standard or Royal Flag
Standard	Dates	Details
	1475–1492	The common royal banner of the Catholic Monarchs, used until 1492, was an oblong white flag with the arms of Isabella I of Castile and Ferdinand II of Aragon in the center with an open royal crown and without supporters.
	1475–1492	The Royal Standard or Royal Flag of the Catholic Monarchs was a white flag with the arms of Isabella I of Castile and Ferdinand II of Aragon in the center with an open royal crown. The Catholic Monarchs's arms were borne by the eagle of Saint John, sable. The Bundle of arrows of Ferdinand II of Aragon and the Yoke of Isabella of Castile where shown as external ornaments.
	1492–1506	From 1492 the conquest of Granada was symbolized by the addition enté en point, a Pomegranate, of a quarter for Granada.
	1556–1580; 1668–1700	The Spanish Monarchs of the House of Habsburg used a crimson flag with the royal arms, crowned with a royal crown with three visible arches and the Order of the Golden Fleece.
	1580–1668	After the dynastic union with Portugal in 1580 an escutcheon of Portugal was added on the honor point in the royal arms.
	1700–1761	Philip V introduced in the Royal Standard the changes of the royal arms of Spain with a royal crown with five visible arches.
	1761–1834	In 1761 Charles III modified the royal arms, added the Farnese and Medici arms.
	1838–1868; 1875–1931	In 1838 the colour of the Royal Standard was modified (crimson to Purpure).
	1975–2014 (As King of Spain) 2014- (As King Emeritus)	Juan Carlos I used a dark blue background instead of the traditional crimson. The proportions of the coat of arms were reduced. Joined to the shield was the red saltire of Burgundy and, to the dexter and sinister of the base point, the yoke gules in its natural position with ribbons, of the field, and the sheaf of five arrows gules with the arrowheads inverted and ribbons, of the field, which used to be the symbol of the Catholic Monarchs.

== The Standard and the Guidon of the Princess or Prince of Asturias ==
The Standard of the Princess of Asturias

The Standard of the Princess of Asturias (Estandarte de la Princesa de Asturias) is regulated by Royal Decree 979/2015, an amendment to Title II of Spanish Royal Decree 1511/1977.

The Princess's Standard comprises a light blue (the colour of the Flag of Asturias) square flag displaying the coat of arms of the Prince of Asturias in the center. The Guidon, her military ensign, has a gold surround.

== Other Standards ==
Personal Standard of Letizia, Queen of Spain (Not officialized)
Personal Standard of Sofia, Queen of Spain (Not officialized)
Personal Standard of Infanta Sofía (Not officialized)
Personal Standard of Infanta Elena, Duchess of Lugo (Not officialized)
Personal Standard of Infanta Cristina (Not officialized)
Personal Standard of Infanta Margarita, Duchess of Soria and Hernani (Not officialized)

== Spanish Royal Banners in Windsor ==
Juan Carlos I (1988)

Felipe VI (2018)

A banner of arms is a square or oblong heraldic flag that is larger than a pennon. It bears the entire coat of arms of the owner, composed precisely as upon a shield but in a square or rectangular shape. Banners of knights of the Order of the Garter are displayed during their lifetime at St George's Chapel in Windsor. From Victorian times, Garter banners have been approximately 5 feet by 5 feet and have a fringe. Reigning European monarchs are admitted to the Order as "Strangers". Juan Carlos I and his successor Felipe VI are concurrently Stranger Knights of the Garter. The Spanish monarch's banner (like the arms) is divided into four quarters: the 1st for Castile, 2nd for León, 3rd for Aragon and 4th for Navarre; enté en point, with a pomegranate for Granada and an inescutcheon with the arms of the regnant House of Bourbon-Anjou. The fringe is golden, as for other foreign monarchs and British Royal Family members.

The castle of Castile, with three windows and narrow, and the Navarrese chains are carefully detailed in both banners, according to the designs displayed in the amendment to Title II of Royal Decree 527/2014 (for King Felipe VI) and the original contents of Title II of Spanish Royal Decree 1511/1977 (for King Juan Carlos).

The tinctures of the pomegranate are changed in the banner of King Juan Carlos, Gules seeded Or, and it is carefully designed and coloured in his successor's one, proper (light) seeded Gules. The colour of the lion is so darkly in the case of King Juan Carlos and precise in Felipe VI's heraldic flag. Other Spanish members of the Garter were Alfonso V of Aragon (1450-†1458), Ferdinand the Catholic, Charles I (1508-†1558), Philip II (1554-†1598), Ferdinand VII (1814–†1833), Alfonso XII (1881–†1885) and Alfonso XIII (1902–†1941).

== Former Standards ==
Personal Standards of former members of the Royal House, and standards previously used by current members of the royal house.

Personal Standard of Infante Carlos, Duke of Calabria

Personal Standard of Infanta Alicia, Duchess Dowager of Calabria

Personal Standard of Infanta Pilar, Duchess of Badajoz

Personal Standard of Letizia, Princess of Asturias
2004-2014
(Not officialized)
Personal Standard of Sofia, Queen of Spain
1975-2025
(Not officialized)

== See also ==
- Coat of arms of the King of Spain
- Coat of arms of the Prince of Asturias
- Heraldic flag
- Spanish monarchy
