= Prince of Asturias =

Heir to the Castilian and then Spanish throne

Princess of Asturias
- Princesa de Asturias
- Coat of arms of the Princess of Asturias

- Standard of the princess

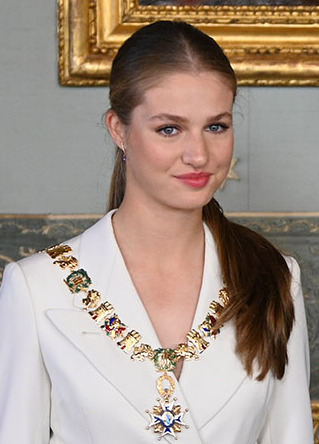
- Incumbent; Leonor since 19 June 2014
- Style: Her Royal Highness; Doña
- Residence: The Prince's Pavilion at the Zarzuela Palace
- Appointer: The King of Spain
- Inaugural holder: Henry III of Castile
- Formation: 17 September 1388
- Website: www.casareal.es

Prince or Princess of Asturias (Spanish: Príncipe/Princesa de Asturias) is the main substantive title used by the heir apparent, or heir presumptive to the Spanish Crown.

According to the Spanish Constitution of 1978:

Article 57.2: The Crown Prince, from the time of his birth or the event conferring this position upon him, shall hold the title of Prince of Asturias and the other titles traditionally held by the heir to the Crown of Spain.

The title originated in 1388, when King John I of Castile granted the dignity – which included jurisdiction over the territory of Asturias – to his first-born son Henry. In an attempt to end the dynastic struggle between the heirs of Kings Peter I and Henry II of Castile, the principality was chosen as the highest jurisdictional lordship the King could grant that had not yet been granted to anyone. The custom of granting unique titles to royal heirs had already been in use in the Crown of Aragon (Prince of Girona) and the kingdoms of England (Prince of Wales), and France (Dauphin of Viennois). The title, therefore, had two purposes: to serve as a generic title to name the heir apparent or heir presumptive, and as a specific title to apply to the prince who was first in the line of succession when the King transmitted to him the territory of the principality, with its government and its income.

After the formation of the dynastic union between the Kingdoms of Castile and Aragon under the Catholic Monarchs, the title was favoured by the Spanish King, who by custom applied it in the same way, i.e. to his heir apparent. For generations the kingdom's crown prince accumulated the titles "Prince of Asturias, Girona, Spain and the New World", modifying those of the earlier regnant Habsburgs: "Prince of these Kingdoms, Prince of the Spains and the New World" (Príncipe de estos Reynos, príncipe de las Españas y del Nuevo Mundo).

When the Bourbons acceded to the Spanish throne in 1705, the title was retained following the decisive help of Castile to the house in the War of the Spanish Succession. At the beginning of the 19th century, the Spanish Constitution of 1812 (European year of revolutions) with consent of its counterparties ascribed the title to the heir of the Crown. The Constitutions within the following decades temporarily removed the synonymy between the title and position as heir to the Crown; before being reinstated and recited in the second half of the 19th century, first half of the 20th century, and on the restoration of the monarchy (under parliamentary predominance) in 1978.

== History ==
The jurisdictional lordships, forms of government – not of ownership or possession, which were consolidated in the 14th and 15th centuries – were subrogations of the royal power for the administration of towns, usually those with geographical or structural difficulties that generated income. From King Alfonso XI the rulers created these lordships to give to their allies a proper way to maintain their position and to be able to govern and administer areas that were otherwise difficult to take care of with the traditional channels of the monarchy. From its origins, there have been buying and selling operations.

=== Origins: Counties of Noreña and Gijón ===
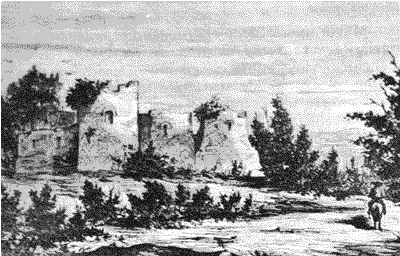
Noreña Castle, 19th-century engraving

The origins of the Principality of Asturias can be traced to the counties of Noreña and Gijón – located in the ancient Asturias de Oviedo – territories with seignorial jurisdiction that belonged to Rodrigo Álvarez, who was called "of the Asturias". These lordships were unique: they were territories that in remote times formed the Kingdom of Asturias, the one identified with the origins of the monarchy.

When Rodrigo died without an heir in 1333, he bequeathed his domains to Henry, Count of Trastámara and illegitimate half-brother of King Peter I, during whose reign a "true civil war" – in the words of Luis Suárez Fernández – took place in Asturias de Oviedo because a group of knights settled in small dominions believed that the consolidation of the "states" that were being occupied by the Count of Trastámara (in a civil war against the King), would affect their power. Henry, once King, ceded the counties to his illegitimate son Alfonso Enríquez. During the reign of his half brother King John I, the Count of Noreña and Gijón revolted against him several times; for this reason, the King decided to confiscate the counties and incorporate them to the Crown, promising in a document dated 18 July 1383 that they would always remain part of the royal demesne.

=== Creation of the Principality ===
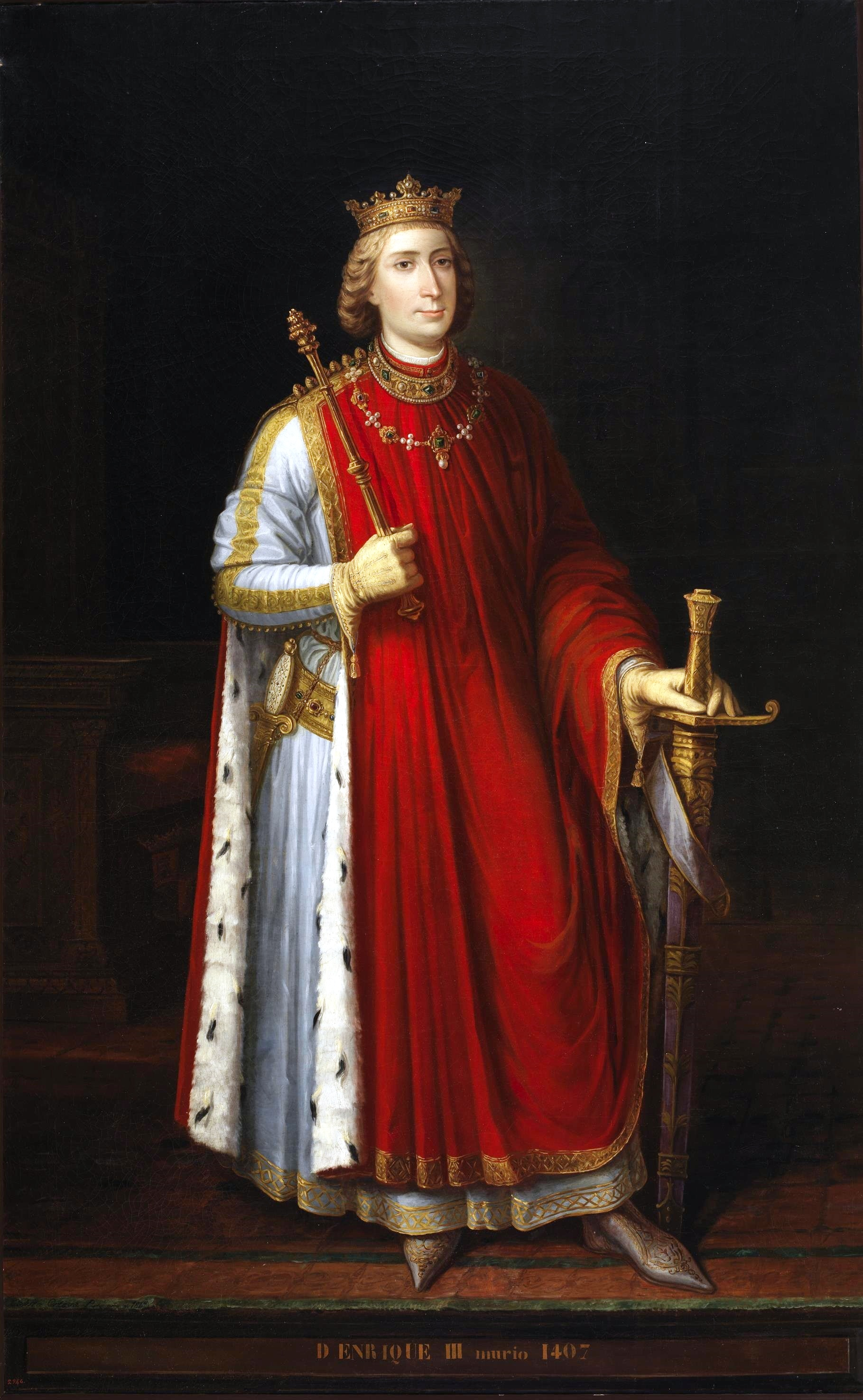
Imaginative portrait of King Henry III of Castile, by Calixto Ortega, 1848. He was the first Prince of Asturias, proclaimed in 1388.

After the assassination of King Peter I in 1369, there began a series of disputes and long rivalries between John, Duke of Lancaster (who claimed the Castilian throne as the husband of Constance, eldest surviving daughter of King Peter I and his mistress María de Padilla but recognized as legitimate and in line of succession by the Cortes of 1362), and the two successive Trastámara claimants, Henry II and his son John I. After two decades of conflicts of varying intensity, the parties arrived at a compromise through means of the marriage between Prince Henry (son and heir of King John I) and Catherine of Lancaster (only surviving child of John and Constance).

Otrosi pusieron é ordenaron los dichos Rey Don Juan é Duque de Alencastre en sus tratos, que el dicho Infante Don Enrique oviese título de se llamar Príncipe de Asturias, é la dicha Doña Catalina Princesa : é fué ordenado que á dia cierto fuese venida la dicha Doña Catalina en Castilla.

On 8 July 1388 the Treaty of Bayonne was signed between John of Lancaster and King John I of Castile, establishing the final dynastic reconciliation after the assassination of King Peter I. By this treaty, the Duke of Lancaster and his wife Constance renounced all their rights over the Castilian throne on behalf of the marriage of their daughter Catherine to the first-born son of King Juan I of Castile, the future Henry III, who was granted as heir the dignity of Prince of Asturias. The title was granted with a ceremony.

The premature death of John I and the minority of Henry III prevented the institutional and juridical conformation of the principality while Alfonso Enríquez rebelled again after obtaining his freedom by royal decree. Besieged by the King's troops, he submitted to the arbitration of King Charles VI of France, who imposed on the count the return of the territories he held in Asturias. The territory was subdued, and his royal status was confirmed.

In the early days of its creation, the title of Prince of Asturias was not just a simple honorific title, as it included control of the territory of Asturias. The Prince ruled it in representation of the King and was able to appoint judges, mayors, etc. King John II by decree dated in Tordesillas on 3 March 1444 declared the conversion of the principality into a jurisdictional lordship, linking the cities, towns, and places of Asturias de Oviedo with their rents and jurisdictions to the Majorat of the heirs of the Crown; however, this document was in some case disobeyed and ignored by the Asturian towns as it went against their traditional fueros. On 31 May of that same year the future Henry IV tried to make the Majorat effective and remember Oviedo and the twenty-one principal Asturian villages that rightfully belonged to his lordship even though he had not "executed or used [the principality] because of my minority and the great debates and scandals that have taken place in these kingdoms".

With the legal conformation, the duality principality–lordship was recovered and would last under the jurisdiction of the Prince until the time of Catholic Monarchs, who limited the scope of the title, making it merely honorary; this decision was upheld by the members of the House of Habsburg and the House of Bourbon until the present day.

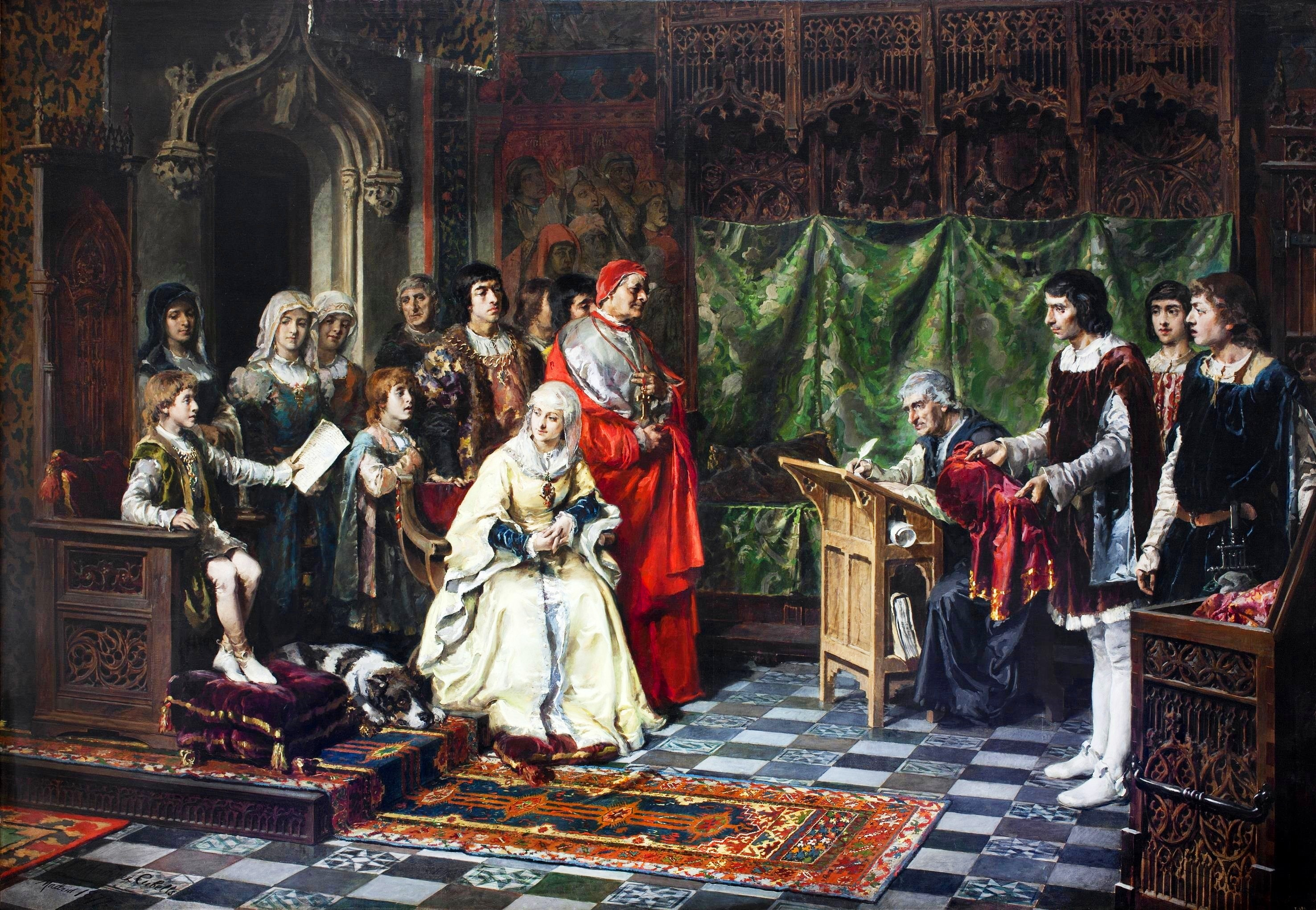
Education of Prince John, by Salvador Martínez Cubells 1877. John was the only son of the Catholic Monarchs and heir of all their domains during his lifetime.

Although all the heirs of the Crown of Castile have traditionally been considered Princes of Asturias, not all had a formal act by which the jurisdictional lordship was granted; strictly speaking, the only Princes of Asturias were Henry, during 1388–1390, Enrique, during 1444–1453, Isabella during 1468–1474, and John, briefly during 1496–1497. In the periods in which no prince was proclaimed, the Principality did not disappear but was directly governed by the monarch, to whose treasury were sent the jurisdictional rents.

With the Catholic Monarchs, there began a policy of reintegration of the royal patrimony that gave rise to a long fight with the principality, lasting from 1483 to 1490, with the signing of an agreement by which the House of Quiñones handed over to the Crown the districts of Cangas, Tineo, Llanes, and Ribadesella in exchange for five million maravedis and the Leonese Babias. In 1496 there was an attempt to revive the principality by Royal Letter dated 20 May, in which the monarchs, "wishing to observe the ancient custom" of their Kingdoms – an allusion to Aragon – gave to Prince John the rents and jurisdictions of the Asturian places that had previously reverted to the Crown, reserving to them the majority of the judges and the condition of not alienating his patrimony.

=== Decadence under the Habsburgs ===
With Prince John the title was added to a list of titles used by the Hispanic monarchy, the heir adding the titles of Prince of Asturias, Girona (1496), Spain, and the New World. The imperialist aspirations are observed in the new title of the heir of the Catholic Monarchs: "Prince of these Kingdoms, Prince of the Spains and the New World" (Príncipe de estos Reynos, Príncipe de las Españas y del Nuevo Mundo). The title lives from that moment a time of partial decadence with the establishment of the House of Habsburg on the Spanish throne; for example, Philip II was educated to take on the functions of Regent during the absences of his father, not like a Prince of Asturias. The 16th and 17th centuries were characterized by various conflicts between the King and the principality because of the titles and dignities granted and referring to the territory. Only during the reign of Philip IV was a proper ceremony introduced for the Prince's oath as heir.

=== Absolutism under the Bourbons ===
With the arrival of the House of Bourbon to the Spanish throne after the War of the Spanish Succession begins a new period for the Principality of Asturias, whose population looked upon the new dynasty with hope. The new royal house promoted an identification of the Principality with the Spanish heir following the aid given by the Crown of Castile during the war, and the Principality of Asturias, which until then had been held by the heir of Castile, tended to be considered properly Spanish. (Note: Like the Castilian Public law happens to be the Spanish one by the Nueva Planta decrees, after extending to Aragon, who supported Archduke Charles during the War of Succession.)

=== 19th century Constitutions ===
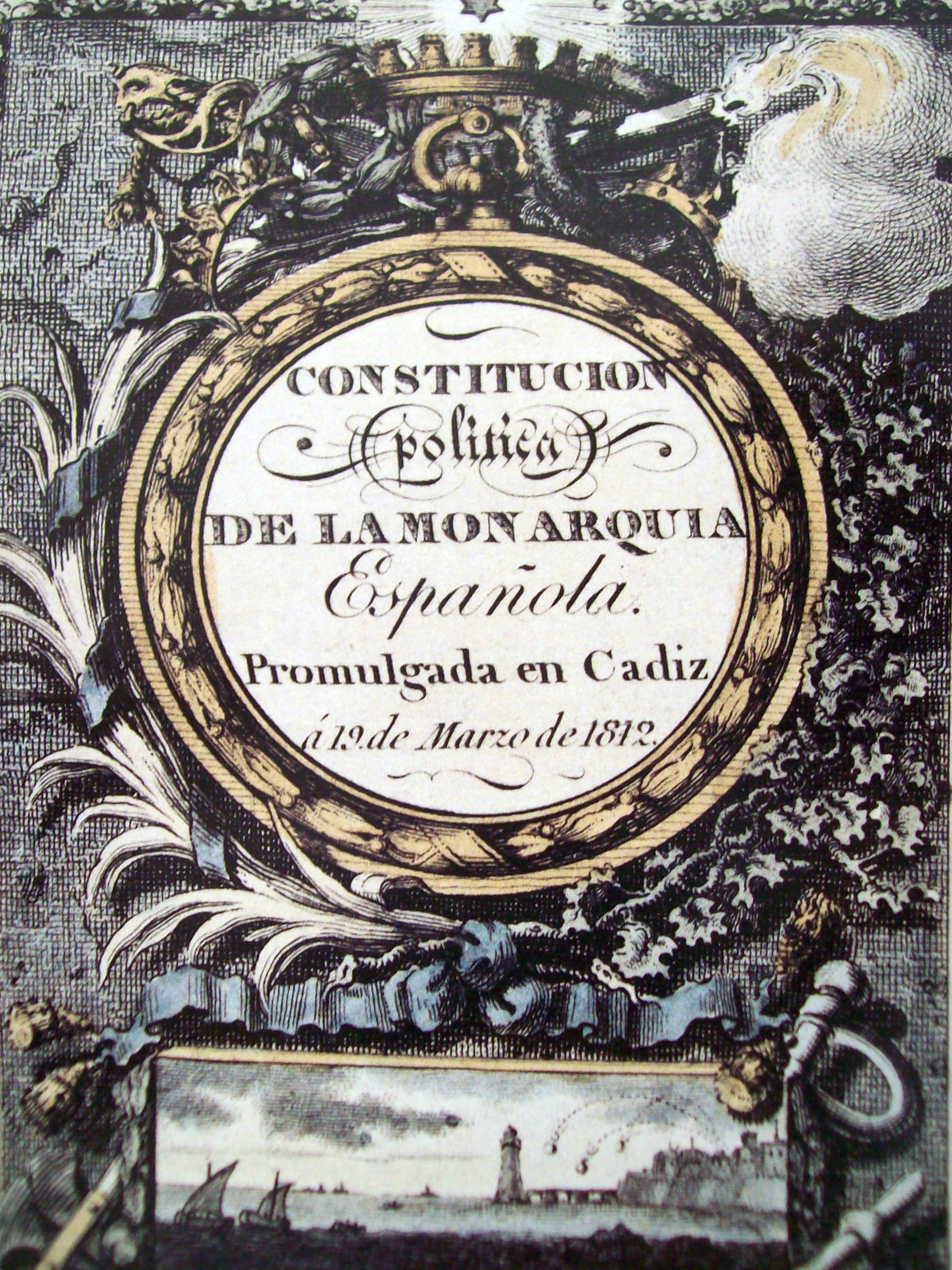
Cover of the first edition of the Political Constitution of the Spanish monarchy. Cádiz, 19 March 1812

Another period for the title began at the beginning of the 19th century with the arrival of the constitutional regime. For Agustín Argüelles, an Asturian deputy in the Cortes of Cádiz, the draft of the Constitution of 1812 preserved more by "custom than by utility or precision" the title of Prince of Asturias to the heir of the Crown. The commission responsible for the writing of the new constitution, equating the Crown Prince with the Prince of Asturias, proposed that the Cortes should recognize him immediately after announcing his birth and that upon reaching the age of 14, the prince should swear before the Cortes the defence of the Catholic faith, the preservation of the Constitution, and obedience to the King. During discussions, some deputies proposed that the Prince should be renamed of the Spains and not of Asturias, while others wanted him to use the dignity only after his oath and not from his birth. Besides Argüelles, the Asturians Pedro Inguanzo Rivero and Alonso Cañedo Vigil, each with opposing ideologies, defended, respectively, a title of honor or a title that was purely nominal, without royal rights but consecrated by history. The project remained unchanged and was finally approved. (Note: The references to the Prince in the Constitution of 1812 are showed in the Chapter IV, title IV of the document: Art. 201. The first-born child of the King will be titled Prince of Asturias. [...]; Art. 206. The Prince of Asturias cannot leave the Kingdom without the consent of the Cortes, and if he leaves without it, he will remain for the same fact excluded from the succession to the Crown. [...]; Art. 208. The Prince of Asturias, Infantes and Infantas and their children and descendants who are subjects of the King, cannot contract marriage without [the king's] consent and that of the Cortes, under penalty of being excluded from the succession to the Crown. [...]; Art. 210. The Prince of Asturias will be recognized by the Cortes with the formalities that will prevent the regulation of the internal Government of them.; Art. 211. This recognition will be made in the first courts held after his birth.; Art. 212. The Prince of Asturias, upon reaching the age of 14, will take the following oath before the Cortes: "N. (name), Prince of Asturias, I swear by God and by the Holy Gospels, that I will defend and preserve the Catholic, Apostolic, Roman religion, without allowing any other in the Kingdom; That I will keep the Political Constitution of the Spanish Monarchy, and that I will be faithful and obedient to the King. So help me God.")

The synonymy of the title "Prince of Asturias" with the heir of the throne was eliminated in the constitutions of 1837 and 1845, instead referring to the "immediate heir to the crown" (Article 20 of the Constitution of 1837) and "immediate successor to the Crown", " immediate successor, "and" first-born son of the King " (articles 39, 47, and 61 of the Constitution of 1845).

The royal decree of 30 May 1850 attributes to the "immediate successors to the Crown", according to the Constitution of the Monarchy, without distinction of men or women," the continued use of "Prince of Asturias". Queen Isabella II gave birth to a daughter, Isabella, on 20 December 1851 and as a result of this decree, the newborn received the title of "Princess of Asturias". Isabella would lose this title with the birth of her brother, the future Alfonso XII, in 1857.

The Constitution of 1869 kept the traditional denomination of Prince of Asturias due to the influence of the Asturian politician José Posada Herrera. Alfonso XII ascended the throne in 1874 following the end of the brief First Spanish Republic and as the infanta Isabella was the immediate heir to the Crown after her brother Alfonso, she once again became "Princess of Asturias" by royal order of 25 March 1875, applying the doctrine of 1850 by granting the title of Princess without distinguishing between male or female successor. The subsequent Constitution of 1876 omitted the title again from its provisions, similar to the constitutions of 1837 and 1845.

Alfonso's wife, Maria Christina of Austria, was expecting a child with many hoping for a male heir. A new decree dated 1 August 1880, established the ceremony for the presentation of the "Prince or Infanta" as Maria Christina was close to giving birth; the decision to formally establish the title was immediately appealed by a commission of the Provincial Delegation of Oviedo, which asked for the return of the title based on the validity of the decree of 1850. The decree establishing the ceremony for the presentation of the child was published in the Gazette of Madrid of 1 September 1880, in which the heir was referred to as Prince of Asturias.

The royal decree of 22 August 1880 tried to clarify all the confusion and established the titles and honors of the Prince and Infantes. It was preceded by a statement of reasons in which the head of government Antonio Cánovas del Castillo, who was also a historian, sought to establish the true profile of the institution, arguing that there was an "unnecessary and inaccurate" confusion between the right of succession and the title of Prince of Asturias, that the Castilian investiture of the Principality of Asturias should not be confused with the succession to the Spanish Crown, that the single denomination of "Prince" or "Prince of these Kingdoms" be reserved, and that the legislators of Cádiz had exceeded their functions, sowing confusion in the constitutional articles. The decree established that the title had not been a creation of the Cortes, but of the King's will, and restored the "secular uses", maintaining the title of Prince for the first-born sons of the monarch, using the denomination of Asturias. The decree stated that any other immediate successor, male or female, had to be granted the title.

Maria Christina gave birth to a girl on 11 September 1880, to much disappointment, and the infant was initially treated only as an infanta. Cánovas, who wanted the crown to pass to a male, ignored the baby. After considerable criticism, the new liberal government of Práxedes Mateo Sagasta was limited to restoring the principles of the decree of 1850, granting the title of Princess of Asturias to Infanta María de las Mercedes in a royal decree dated 10 March 1881.

=== Current democracy ===
With the restoration of the monarchy in 1975, the Royal Decree of 21 January 1977, supported by the Provincial Delegation of Oviedo, ordered that the son of King Juan Carlos I, Prince Felipe, bear the title of Prince of Asturias, in addition to those titles traditionally appertaining to the heir of the throne. The process culminated in the promulgation of the Constitution of 1978, whose article 57 says that the Crown Prince will be Prince of Asturias and can use the other titles linked to his person, symbolically embodying the Spanish dynastic union.

== Titles and functions ==
The Prince of Asturias, as crown prince, is the first in the line of succession to the Spanish throne, receives the treatment of Royal Highness by Royal Decree 1368/1987 and holds the titles inherent to that position, recognized in the article 57.1 of the Constitution, and which symbolize the Spanish dynastic union. In addition to the principal of Prince of Asturias (as heir of the Crown of Castile), the heir also has the following titles:

- Prince of Girona, Duke of Montblanc, Count of Cervera, and Lord of Balaguer as the heir of the Crown of Aragon, with origins in 1351, 1387, 1353, and 1418, respectively.
- Prince of Viana, as the heir of Kingdom of Navarre, with origin in 1424.

He or she also presides over the Princess of Asturias and Princess de Girona Foundations, named Prince of Asturias and Prince of Girona when the heir is male.

Upon reaching the age of majority, she or he must take an oath before the Cortes Generales to faithfully carry out her duties, to keep and enforce the Constitution and laws, and to respect the rights of citizens and autonomous communities, as well as show fidelity to the King, according to Article 61 of the constitution. This procedure was introduced in 1978 since, before the promulgation of this constitution, the Princes of Asturias had to receive the oath of allegiance from the Cortes. The current titular of the Principality is Leonor, who took that dignity on 19 June 2014, when her father, King Felipe VI, ascended to the throne following the abdication of her grandfather Juan Carlos I.

== List ==
Following is a list of the princes of Asturias from the creation of the title in 1388, as dignity of the heir of the Crown of Castile, until today, when it has been incorporated to the set of titles historically linked to the crown prince of Spain as the main one of them:

Image	Prince/Princess (Lifespan)	Heir to		From	Until	
Image	Prince/Princess (Lifespan)	Monarch's name	Monarch's relation	From	Year	Cause
	Henry (1379–1406)	John I	Father	1388	1390	Ascended the throne as Henry III
	Maria (1401–1458)	Henry III	Father	1402	1405	Displaced by the birth of brother
	John (1405–1454)	Henry III	Father	1405	1406	Ascended the throne as John II
	Catherine (1422–1424)	John II	Father	1423	1424	Died
	Eleanor (1423–1425) (Note: Sometimes omitted from the lists of Princes. She was sworn in as Princess of Asturias in the Cortes of Burgos of 1424 only by the procurators of twelve cities. Some authors deny validity of this oath, since the King did not sanction the proclamation, as he waited for the birth of her brother Enrique on 5 January 1425, who was sworn as heir and Prince by the Cortes in April of the same year.)	John II	Father	1424	1425	Displaced by the birth of brother
	Henry (1425–1474)	John II	Father	1425	1454	Ascended the throne as Henry IV
	Joanna (1462–1530)	Henry IV	Father	1462 (Note: Sworn in the Cortes of Madrid on 9 May.)	1464	Disinherited in favour of half-uncle
	Alfonso (1453–1468)	Henry IV	Half-brother	1464 (Note: In the district of Cabezón-Cigales, Henry IV promulgated the Royal Decree of 4 September recognizing his brother Alfonso as successor, however no Cortes were summoned to carry out the oath of the heir. Alfonso, as Prince, ordered Diego Fernández de Quiñones, Count of Luna, to seize the Principality and administer it in his name.)	1465	Proclaimed King in the Farce of Ávila (Note: On 5 June 1465, in the Farce of Ávila, the Nobility League proclaimed Prince Alfonso as King.) (Note: Once proclaimed King, during the civil war that confronted to him to his half-brother Henry IV, Alfonso managed to take possession of the Principality like part of the royal patrimony and be recognized there as monarch. Alfonso died by unknown causes in 1468, leaving Henry IV as sole and undisputed sovereign. The bibliographical references to Alfonso in the period of 1465–1468 called him Prince Alfonso or Infante Alfonso.)
	Isabella (1451–1504)	Henry IV	Half-brother	1468 (Note: By the Treaty of the Bulls of Guisando of 19 September 1468, Henry IV officially recognized his half-sister Isabella as Princess of Asturias. She ordered the Count of Luna to exercise the administration of the Principality in her name. However, in the following Cortes, in Ocaña, the traditional swearing-in did not take place.)	1470	Disinherited in favour of half-niece (Note: At the Ceremony of the Val de Lozoya of 25 October 1470, Henry IV annulled the Treaty of the Bulls of Guisando and proclaimed his daughter Joanna as Princess of Asturias. Nevertheless, Isabella maintained the control of the Principality through the Count of Luna.)
	Joanna (1462–1530)	Henry IV	Father	1470	1474	Crown assumed by Isabella I (Note: After the death of Henry IV on 11 December 1474 began the War of the Castilian Succession between Isabella (who proclaimed herself Queen on 13 December) and Joanna (who did the same on 30 May 1475). The dynastic fight was finally settled on 4 September 1479 with the Treaty of Alcáçovas, leaving Isabella as legitimate Queen of Castile.)
	Isabella (1470–1498)	Isabella I	Mother	1476	1480	Displaced by the birth of brother
	John (1478–1497)	Isabella I	Mother	1480	1497	Died
	Isabella (1470–1498)	Isabella I	Mother	1498	1498	Died
	Miguel (1498–1500)	Isabella I	Grandmother	1499	1500	Died
	Joanna (1479–1555)	Isabella I	Mother	1502	1504	Ascended the throne as Joanna
	Charles (1500–1558)	Joanna	Mother	1504	1516	Ascended the throne as Charles I
	Philip (1527–1598)	Charles I and Joanna	Father and grandmother	1528	1556	Ascended the throne as Philip II
	Carlos (1545–1568)	Philip II	Father	1560	1568	Died
	Ferdinand (1571–1578)	Philip II	Father	1573	1578	Died
	Diego (1575–1582)	Philip II	Father	1580	1582	Died
	Philip (1578–1621)	Philip II	Father	1584	1598	Ascended the throne as Philip III
	Philip (1605–1665)	Philip III	Father	1608	1621	Ascended the throne as Philip IV
	Balthasar Charles (1629–1646)	Philip IV	Father	1632	1646	Died
	Philip Prosper (1657–1661)	Philip IV	Father	1658	1661	Died
	Charles (1661–1700)	Philip IV	Father	1661	1665	Ascended the throne as Charles II
	Louis (1707–1724)	Philip V	Father	1709	1724	Ascended the throne as Louis I
	Ferdinand (1713–1759)	Philip V	Father	1724	1746	Ascended the throne as Ferdinand VI
	Charles (1747–1819)	Charles III	Father	1760	1788	Ascended the throne as Charles IV
	Ferdinand (1784–1833)	Charles IV	Father	1789	1808	Ascended the throne as Ferdinand VII
	Isabella (1830–1904)	Ferdinand VII	Father	1830 (1833) (Note: Proclaimed Princess of Asturias by Royal Decree dated 13 October 1830, and sworn in as heiress on 20 June 1833.)	1833	Ascended the throne as Isabella II
	Isabella (1851–1931)	Isabella II	Mother	1851	1857	Displaced by the birth of brother
	Alfonso (1857–1885)	Isabella II	Mother	1857	1868	Mother's deposition
	Emmanuel Philibert (1869–1931)	Amadeo	Father	1871	1873	Father's abdication
	Isabella (1851–1931)	Alfonso XII	Brother	1875	1880	Displaced by the birth of niece
	Mercedes (1880–1904)	Alfonso XII	Father	1880	1885	Father died, brother born posthumously and became King at birth
	Mercedes (1880–1904)	Alfonso XIII	Brother	1886	1904	Died
	Alfonso (1907–1938)	Alfonso XIII	Father	1907	1931 (1933) (Note: With the proclamation of the Second Spanish Republic in 1931, royal and nobiliary titles were abolished. On 11 June 1933, Prince Alfonso renounced his dynastic rights to contract a morganatic marriage. The new heir and titular Prince of Asturias should have been Infante Jaime, but the fact that he was deaf-mute led him to be pressured to relinquish his rights, which he did on 23 June. The title of Prince of Asturias in pretense then passed to the third of the sons of King Alfonso XIII, Infante Juan.)	Proclamation of the Second Spanish Republic
	Juan (1913–1993)	Alfonso XIII	Father	1933	1941	Received the dynastic rights from King Alfonso XIII (Note: On 15 January 1941, a few weeks before his death on 28 February, the exiled King Alfonso XIII abdicated in favour of his son and heir, Prince Juan, who became in the new King-in-exile. However, he preferred to use the title Count of Barcelona, a subsidiary title of the Spanish monarch. His first son, Prince Juan Carlos would then be recognized as the new Prince of Asturias. He renounced his claim to the throne in favour of his son on 14 May 1977.)
	Juan Carlos (born 1938)	Juan	Father	1941	1975	Holder of the title in pretense; (Note: Titular Prince of Asturias by designation of his father.); Prince of Spain since 1969. Ascended the throne as Juan Carlos I
	Felipe (born 1968)	Juan Carlos I	Father	1977	2014	Ascended the throne as Felipe VI
	Leonor (born 2005)	Felipe VI	Father	2014	Present	Incumbent

== See also ==
- Asturias
- Asturias, Cebu, Philippines
- Prince of Spain
- Princess of Asturias (by marriage)
- Monarchy of Spain
- Prince of Asturias Awards
- Príncipe de Asturias Peak
- Spanish aircraft carrier Príncipe de Asturias
- List of titles and honours of the Spanish Crown

== Bibliography ==
- Anguera Nolla, Pere (January 2008). La visión de Castilla desde Cataluña. Algunas opiniones (in Spanish). Salamanca: University of Salamanca. pp. 85–104. ISBN 978-84-7800-315-0.
- Coronas González, Santos M. (2001). Príncipe y Principado de Asturias: historia dinástica y territorial de un título (PDF) (in Spanish). Salamanca: Anuario de historia del derecho español. pp. 49–74. ISBN 978-84-7800-315-0.
- Ferrando Badía, Juan (1990). Dictamen sobre el título "Príncipe de Gerona" (PDF) (in Spanish). Salamanca: Consejo Valenciano de Cultura español.
- Suárez Fernández, Luis (2000). "Primera etapa en la institución del Principado de Asturias". Boletín de la Real Academia de la Historia (in Spanish). Salamanca. ISSN 0034-0626.
- Apezarena, José; Castilla, Carmen (1993). Así es el príncipe: vida del futuro rey de España (in Spanish). Ediciones Rialp. p. 174. ISBN 9788432130090.
- Manrique, Cayetano (1862). Historia de la legislacion y recitaciones del derecho civil de España (in Spanish). Imprenta Nacional. p. 8.
- Sampedro Escolar, José Luis (2014). La numeración de los Príncipes de Asturias (PDF) (in Spanish). Real Academia Matritense de Heráldica y Genealogía. Archived from the original (PDF) on 24 September 2015.
- Robles do Campo, Carlos (2009). "Los Infantes de España tras la derogación de la Ley Sálica (1833)". Anales de la Real Academia Matritense de Heráldica y Genealogía (in Spanish). Real Academia Matritense de Heráldica y Genealogía. ISSN 1133-1240., n° XII.
- Suárez Fernández, Luis (2003). Principado de Asturias: un proceso de señorialización regional (in Spanish). Real Academia de la Historia. ISBN 9788495983329.
