= Heraldic flag =

Flag containing coat of arms or heraldic badge

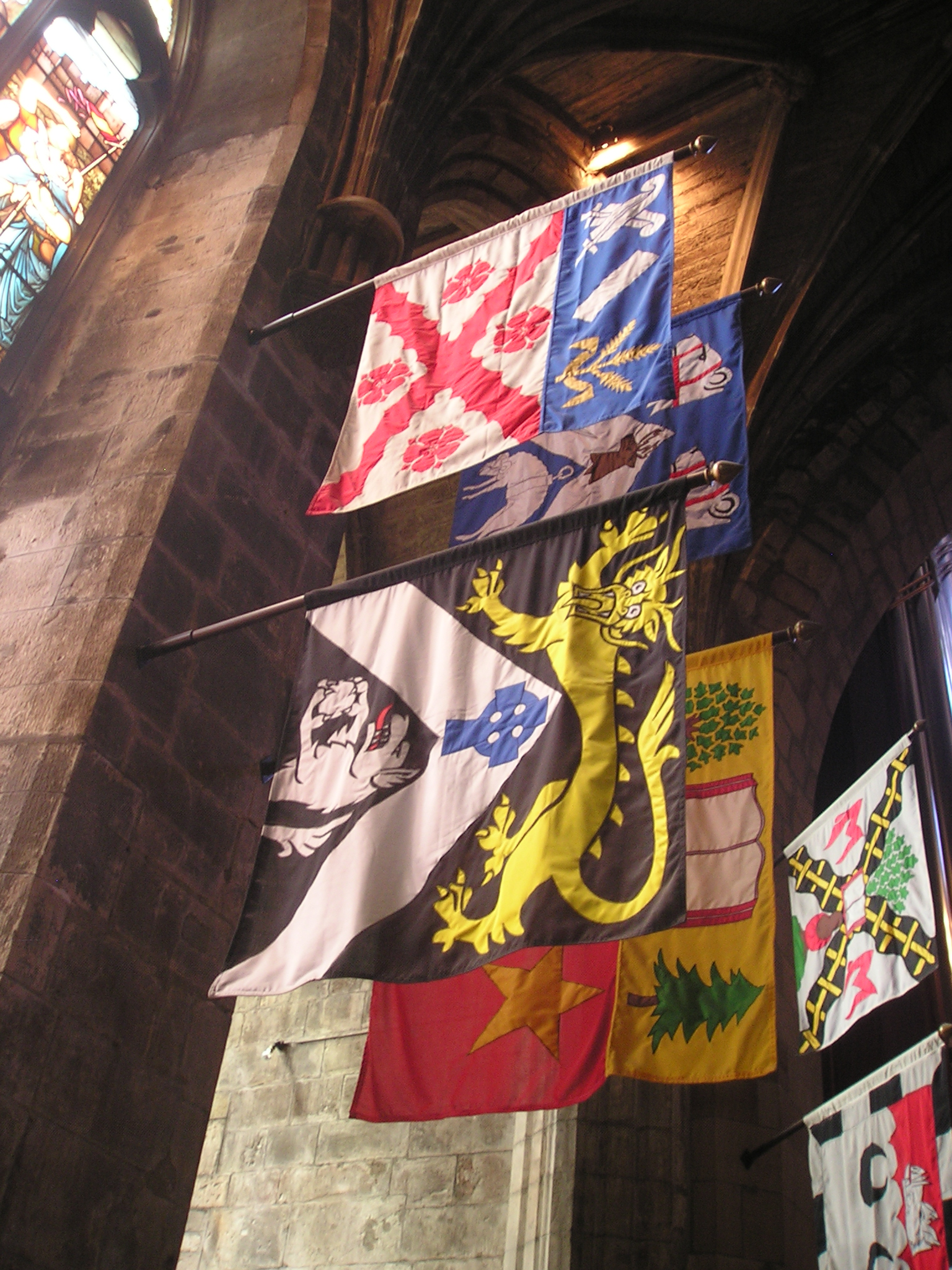
Banners of Knights of the Thistle displayed in St. Giles' Cathedral

In heraldry and vexillology, a heraldic flag is a flag containing coats of arms, heraldic badges, or other devices used for personal identification.

Heraldic flags include banners, standards, pennons and their variants, gonfalons, guidons, and pinsels. Specifications governing heraldic flags vary from country to country, and have varied over time.

== Types ==
=== Pennon ===
The pennon or pennant is a small elongated flag, either pointed or swallow-tailed (when swallow-tailed it may be described as a banderole). It was charged with the heraldic badge or some other armorial ensign of the owner, and displayed on his own lance, as a personal ensign. The pennoncelle was a modification of the pennon.

In contemporary Scots usage, the pennon is 120 cm (four feet) in length. It tapers either to a point or to a rounded end as the owner chooses. It is assigned by the Lord Lyon King of Arms to any armiger who wishes to apply for it.

=== Banner ===
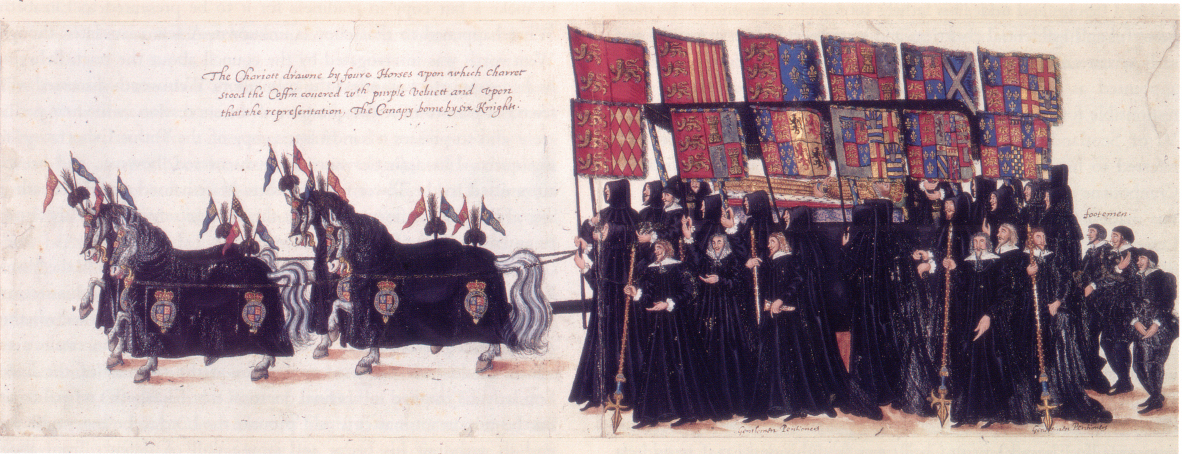
Heraldic banners at the funeral of Elizabeth I. The queen's casket is escorted by mourners bearing the banners of her ancestors' arms marshalled with the arms of their wives.

The banner of arms, also simply called banner, is square or oblong and larger than the pennon, bearing the entire coat of arms of the owner, composed precisely as upon a shield but in a square or rectangular shape.

In the olden time, when a Knight had distinguished himself by conspicuous gallantry, it was the custom to mark his meritorious conduct by prompt advancement on the very field of battle. In such a case, the point or points of the good Knight's Pennon were rent off, and thus the ... small Flag was reduced to the square form of the Banner, by which thenceforth he was to be distinguished

— Charles Boutell, The Handbook to English Heraldry

The banners of members of Orders of Chivalry are typically displayed in the Order's chapel. Banners of Knights of the Order of the Thistle are hung in the 1911 chapel of the Order in St Giles High Kirk in Edinburgh. Banners of Knights of the Order of the Garter are displayed in St George's Chapel at Windsor Castle. From Victorian times Garter banners have been approximately 1.5 m × 1.5 m (5 ft × 5 ft).

Banners became available to all English armigers as a result of a report by Garter to the Earl Marshal dated 29 January 1906. The report stated that the size of a banner for Esquires and Gentlemen should be considered in the future. Until that date, they were available to all noblemen and knights banneret. In 2011, Garter Woodcock said that the banner for an Esquire or Gentleman should be the same size as a Marquess's and those of a lower rank down to Knight, that is, 90 cm × 90 cm (3 ft × 3 ft).

In Scotland, the size of personal banners, excluding any fringes, are specified by the Lord Lyon.

Scottish banners
| Rank | − Shape | − Size |
| The Sovereign | − square | − 1.50 metres |
| Dukes | − square | − 1.25 metres |
| Marquesses and Earls | − square | − 1.10 metres |
| Viscounts and Barons | − square | − 1.00 metres |
| Baronets and feudal Barons | − square | − 0.90 metres |
| Other armigers | − oblong | − 0.85 metres high x 0.70 metres wide |

=== Heraldic standard ===
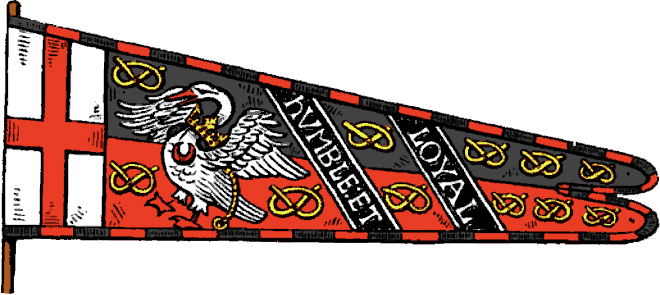
Standard of Sir Henry de Stafford, about 1475, features the Stafford knot and Bohun swan heraldic badges differenced with a crescent gules for cadency. The standard bears the Cross of Saint George for England. Black and red (sable and gules) were Sir Henry's livery colours.

Standard of the Leonese Monarchs during the Middle Ages (until the 13th century). It is one of the oldest heraldic flags, and the documentation for the colours dates from c. 1150.

An example of a standard suitable for a Scottish baronet (who is, in this case, also the chief of Clan MacDonald of Sleat)

The heraldic standard appeared around the middle of the fourteenth century, and it was in general use by personages of high rank during the two following centuries. The standard appears to have been adopted for the special purpose of displaying badges. "The badge was worn on his livery by a servant as retainer, and consequently the standard by which he mustered in camp was of the livery colours, and bore the badge, with both of which the retainer was familiar."

Heraldic flags that are used by individuals, like a monarch or president, as a means of identification are often called 'standards' (e.g. royal standard). These flags, usually banners, are not standards in a strict heraldic sense but have come to be known as such. The heraldic standard is not rectangular – it tapers, usually from 120 to 60 cm (4 to 2 ft), and the fly edge is rounded (lanceolate). In England, any armiger who has been granted a badge is entitled to fly a standard.

The medieval English standard was larger than the other flags, and its size varied with the owner's rank. The Cross of Saint George usually appeared next to the staff, and the rest of the field was generally divided per fess (horizontally) into two colours, in most cases the livery colours of the owner. "With some principal figure or device occupying a prominent position, various badges are displayed over the whole field, a motto, which is placed bend-wise, having divided the standard into compartments. The edges are fringed throughout, and the extremity is sometimes swallow-tailed, and sometimes rounded." The Royal standards of England were used by the kings of England as a headquarters symbol for their armies. Modern usage of the heraldic standard includes the flag of the Master Gunner, St James's Park and the flag of the Port of London Authority (used by the chairman and the Vice Chairman).

The Oriflamme was the battle standard of the King of France during the Middle Ages.

In Scotland, a standard requires a separate grant by the Lord Lyon. Such a grant is made only if certain conditions are met.

The length of the standard depends upon one's noble rank.

Scottish standards
| Rank | − Length |
| The Sovereign | − 7.0 m (previously specified as 8 yards) |
| Dukes | − 6.5 m (previously specified as 7 yards) |
| Marquesses | − 6.0 m (previously specified as 6.5 yards) |
| Earls | − 5.5 m (previously specified as 6 yards) |
| Viscounts | − 5.0 m (previously specified as 5.5 yards) |
| Barons | − 4.5 m (previously specified as 5 yards) |
| Baronets | − 4.0 m (previously specified as 4.5 yards) |
| Knights and Feudal Barons | − 3.5 m (previously specified as 4 yards) |

=== Banderole ===
A banderole (Fr. for a "little banner"), has both a literal descriptive meaning for its use by knights and ships, and is also heraldic device for representing bishops.

Royal Banner of the King of Denmark in the 14th century, based on the Royal Arms of Denmark

=== Gonfalone ===
A gonfalone or gonfalon is a vertically hung banner emblazoned with a coat of arms. Gonfalons have wide use in civic, religious, and academic heraldry. The term originated in Florence, Italy, where communities, or neighborhoods, traditionally displayed gonfaloni in public ceremonies.

=== Guidon ===
The Scots guidon is similar in shape to the standard and pennon. At 2.40 m (previously specified as 8 feet) long, it is smaller than the standard and twice the size of the pennon. Guidons are assigned by the Lord Lyon to those individuals who qualify for a grant of supporters to their Arms and to other individuals who have a following such as individuals who occupy a position of leadership or a long-term official position commanding the loyalty of more than a handful of people. The Guidon tapers to a round, unsplit end at the fly.

A guidon can also refer to a cavalry troop's banner, such as that which survived the Custer massacre.

=== Pinsel ===
The Scottish pinsel is triangular in shape, 60 cm (previously specified as 2 feet) high at the hoist and 135 cm (previously specified as 4.5 feet) in width tapering to a point. This is the flag denoting a person to whom a Clan Chief has delegated authority for a particular occasion, such as a clan gathering when the Chief is absent. This flag is allotted only to Chiefs or very special Chieftain-Barons for practical use, and only upon the specific authority of the Lord Lyon King of Arms.

== See also ==
- Banners of the members of the Garter
- Royal standard of Cambodia
- Royal standards of Canada
  - Flag of the governor general of Canada
  - Flags of the lieutenant governors of Canada
- Royal Standard of Norway
- Royal Standard of Spain
- Royal Standard of the United Kingdom
- Royal standards of England
  - Royal Banner of England
  - Royal Banner of Scotland
- Oriflamme
- Personal Command Sign of the Swedish Monarch
- Royal Standard of Thailand
- King's Flag for Australia
  - Flag of the governor-general of Australia
  - Flags of the governors of the Australian states
- Queen's Personal New Zealand Flag
  - Flag of the governor-general of New Zealand
- Japanese heraldic banners:
  - Fūrinkazan
  - Hata-jirushi
  - Nobori
  - Sashimono
  - Uma-jirushi
