= Jirushi =

A jirushi is a Japanese term for a banner or insignia. More specifically, it can refer to:

- Hata-jirushi, war banners
- Uma-jirushi, commander banners
