= Standard-bearer =

Person who carries a flag

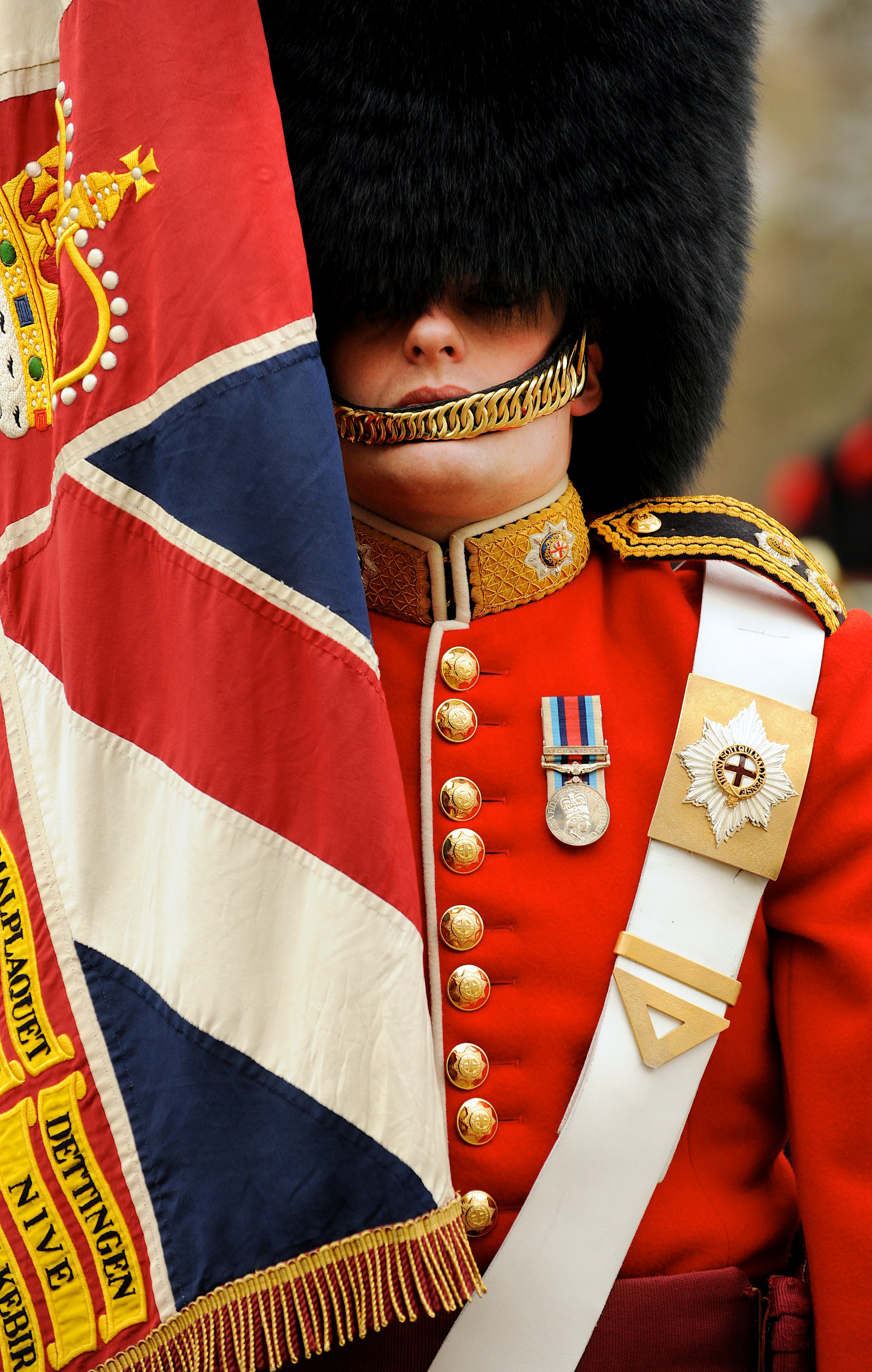
A lieutenant of the Coldstream Guards bears the Regimental Colours during an inspection of No. 7 Company, prior to the start of the ceremonial season.

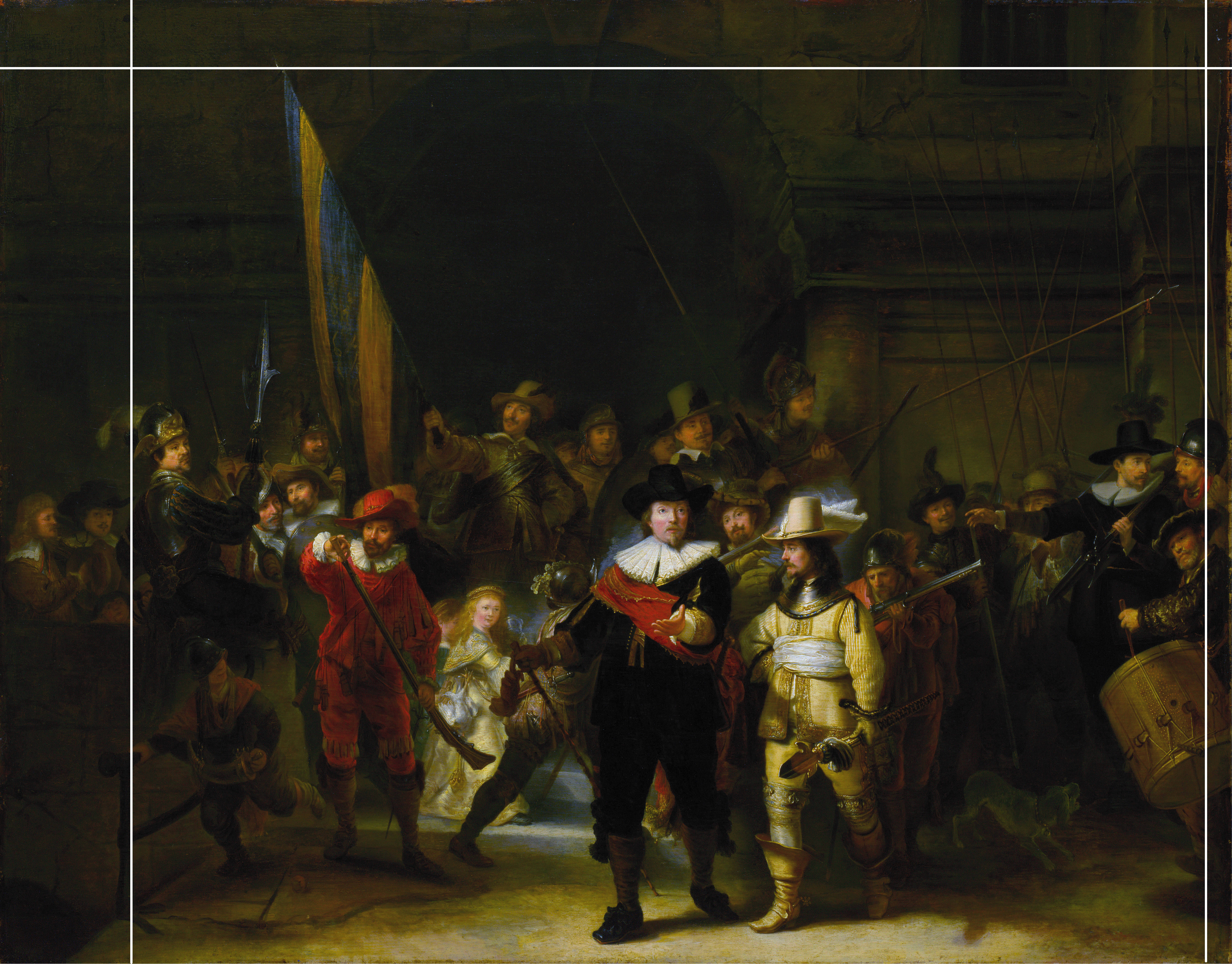
17th-century copy by Gerrit Lundens of The Shooting Company of Frans Banning Cocq and Willem van Ruytenburch aka The Night Watch with lines added indicating the areas cut down from the original painting in 1715

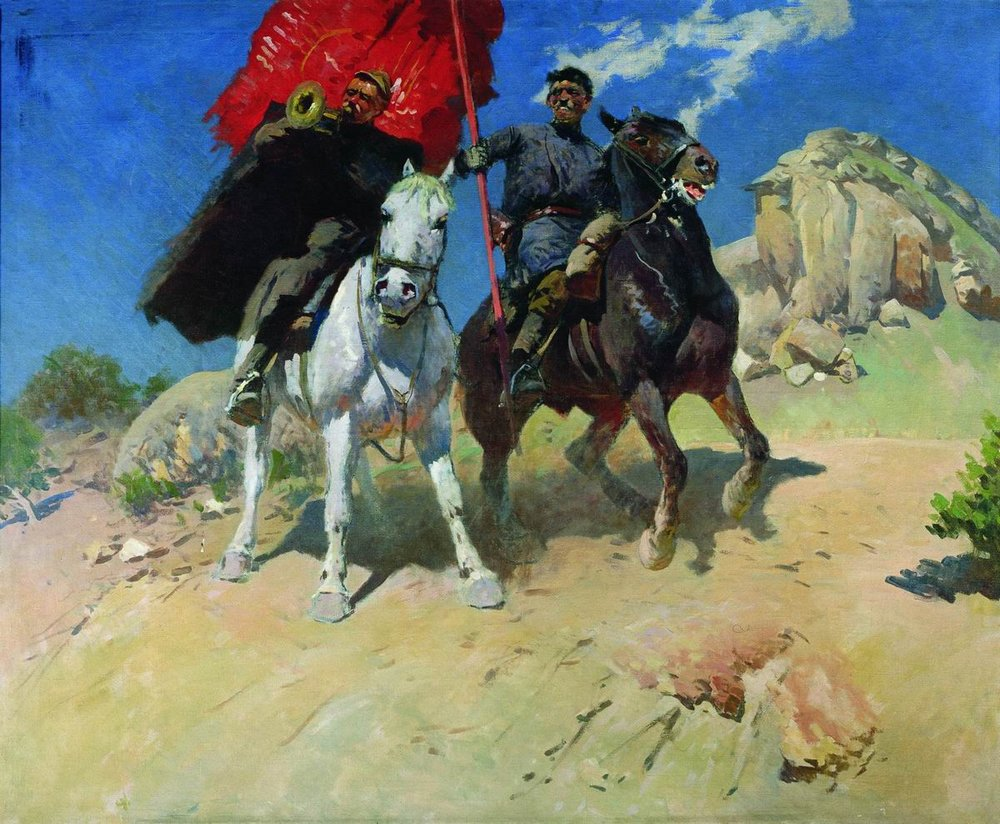
Mitrofan Grekov (1934), Trumpeter and standard-bearer in the Russian Civil War.

A standard-bearer, also known as a colour-bearer, flag-bearer or banner-carrier, is a person who bears an emblem known as a standard or military colours, i.e. either a type of flag or an inflexible but mobile image, which is used (and often honoured) as a formal, visual symbol of a state, prince, military unit, etc. This can either be an occasional duty, often seen as an honour (especially on parade), or a permanent charge (also on the battlefield); the second type has even led in certain cases to this task being reflected in official rank titles such as Chorąży, Ensign, Cornet, Fähnrich and Alferes/Alférez.

== Role ==
In the context of the Olympic Games, a flagbearer is the athlete who carries the flag of their country during the opening and closing ceremonies.

While at present a purely ceremonial function, as far back as Roman warfare and medieval warfare bearing the standard had an important role on the battlefield. The standard-bearer acted as an indicator of where the position of a military unit was, with the bright, colourful standard or flag acting as a strong visual beacon to surrounding soldiers. Soldiers were typically ordered to follow and stay close to the standard or flag in order to maintain unit cohesion, and for a single commander to easily position his troops by only positioning his standard-bearer, typically with the aid of musical cues or loud verbal commands. It was an honorable position carrying a considerable risk, as a standard-bearer would be a major target for the opposing side's troops seeking to capture the standard or pull it down.

In the Roman military the person carrying the standard was called Signifer. In addition to carrying the signum, the signifer also assumed responsibility for the financial administration of the unit and functioned as the legionaries' banker. The Signifer was also a Duplicarius, paid twice the basic wage.

In the city militias of the Dutch Republic, the standard-bearer was often the youngest single man, who was shown in group portraits wearing rich clothing in addition to carrying the flag. Chosen ensigns were good candidates for painters to woo with their portrait skills.

Gonfaloniere of Justice (Gonfaloniere di Giustizia) (literally: "Standard Bearer of Justice" was a post in the government of medieval and early Renaissance Florence.

== See also ==
- Colour guard
- Historical colours, standards and guidons
- Regulation Colours
