= War flag =

Variant of a national flag for use by a country's military forces when on land

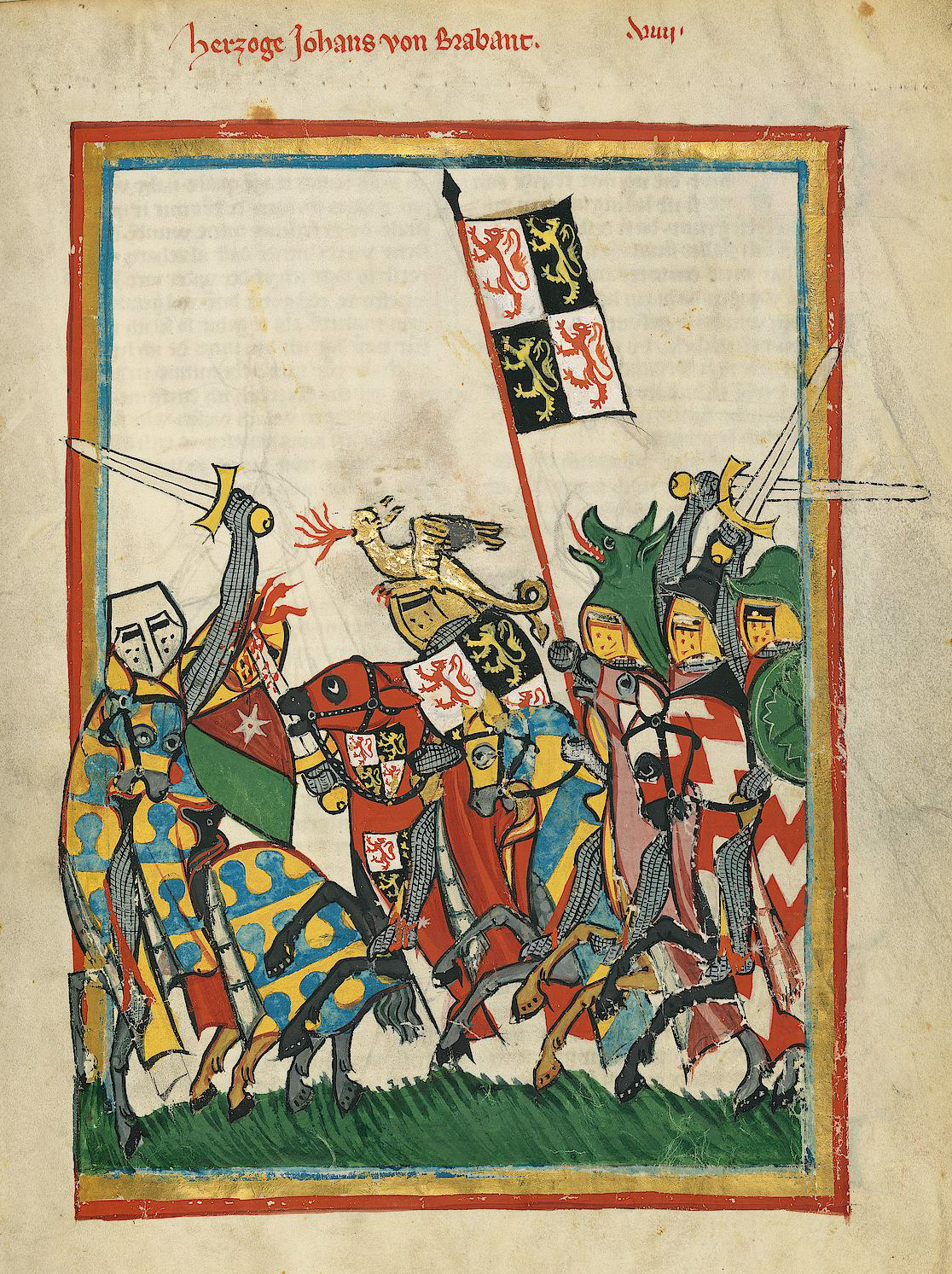
A knight (Jan I van Brabant) flying a heraldic flag in battle, in addition to the heraldic device displayed on his shield (Codex Manesse, c. 1304)

A war ensign, also known as a military flag, battle flag, or standard, is a variant of a national flag for use by a country's military forces when on land. The nautical equivalent is a naval ensign. Under the strictest sense of the term, few countries currently have distinct war flags, most using a flag design that is also the state flag or general national flag for this purpose.

== History ==
Sound trumpets! Let our bloody colours wave! And either victory, or else a grave.

— Edward, Prince of Wales, in Henry VI, Part 3, Act II, Scene II

Field signs were used in early warfare at least since the Bronze Age. The word standard itself is from an Old Frankish term for a field sign (not necessarily a flag).

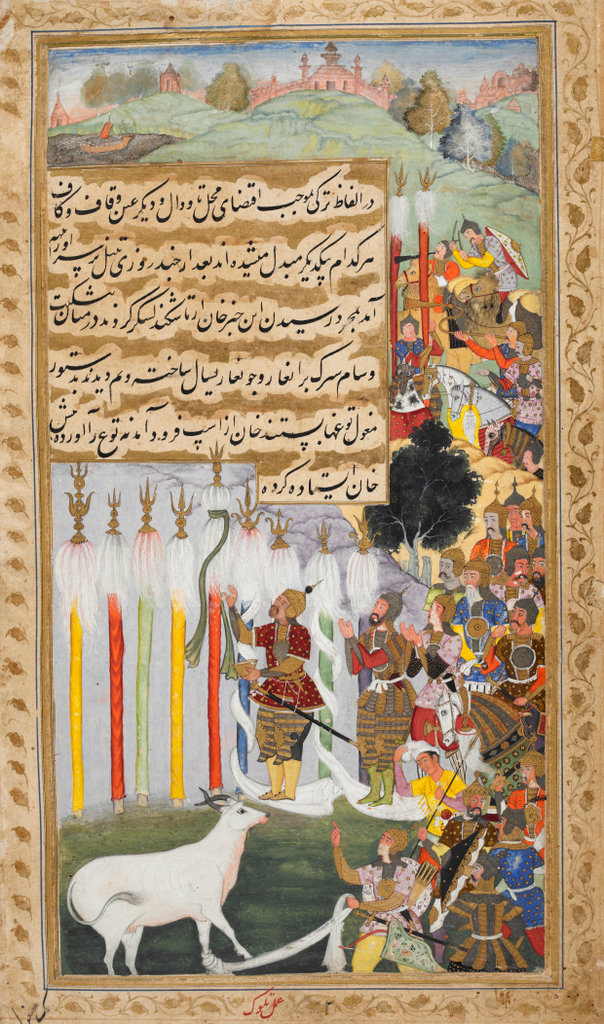
Babur and his Mughal Army saluting the Nine Standards of Timur.

The use of flags as field signs apparently emerges in Asia, during the Iron Age, possibly in either China or India. in Achaemenid Persia, each army division had its own standard, and "all officers had banners over their tents". Early field signs that include, but are not limited to a flag, are also called vexilloid or "flag-like", for example the Roman Eagle standard or the dragon standard of the Sarmatians. The Roman Vexillum itself is also "flag-like" in the sense that it was suspended from a horizontal crossbar as opposed to a simple flagpole.

Use of simple flags as military ensigns becomes common during the medieval period, developing in parallel with heraldry as a complement to the heraldic device shown on shields. The maritime flag also develops in the medieval period. The medieval Japanese Sashimono carried by foot-soldiers are a parallel development.

Some medieval free cities or communes did not have coats of arms, and used war flags that were not derived from a coat of arms. Thus, the city of Lucerne used a blue-white flag as a field sign from the mid 13th century, without deriving it from a heraldic shield design.

== Current war flags ==
=== Used by armed forces only ===
War flag of Brunei

Canadian Armed Forces ensign

War flag of the People's Liberation Army of China

War flag of the Republic of China Armed Forces

War flag of Georgia

Flag of the Iranian Army

War flag of Italy

Flag of the Japan Ground Self-Defense Force

War flag of the Korean People's Army Ground Force of North Korea

Flag of the Armed Forces of Moldova

Flag of the Armed Forces of Myanmar

Flag of the Armed Forces of Pakistan

War flag of Peru

War flag (regimental color) of Portugal

Banner of the Armed Forces of the Russian Federation

War flag of the Royal Staff of Saudi Arabian Armed Forces

Flag of the Armed Forces of Serbia

Flag of the Armed Forces of Ukraine

Flag of the Vietnam People's Army

=== Army (land) use only ===
Bangladesh Army

British Army non-ceremonial flag

Bulgaria

Flag of the People's Liberation Army Ground Force

War flag of the Republic of China Army

War flag of Colombia

Georgia Land Forces

War flag (regimental color) of the Hellenic Army

War flag of Hungary

Indian Army

Iranian Army Ground Forces

Malaysian Army flag

Myanmar Army flag

Pakistan Army

Polish Land Forces

Russian Ground Forces

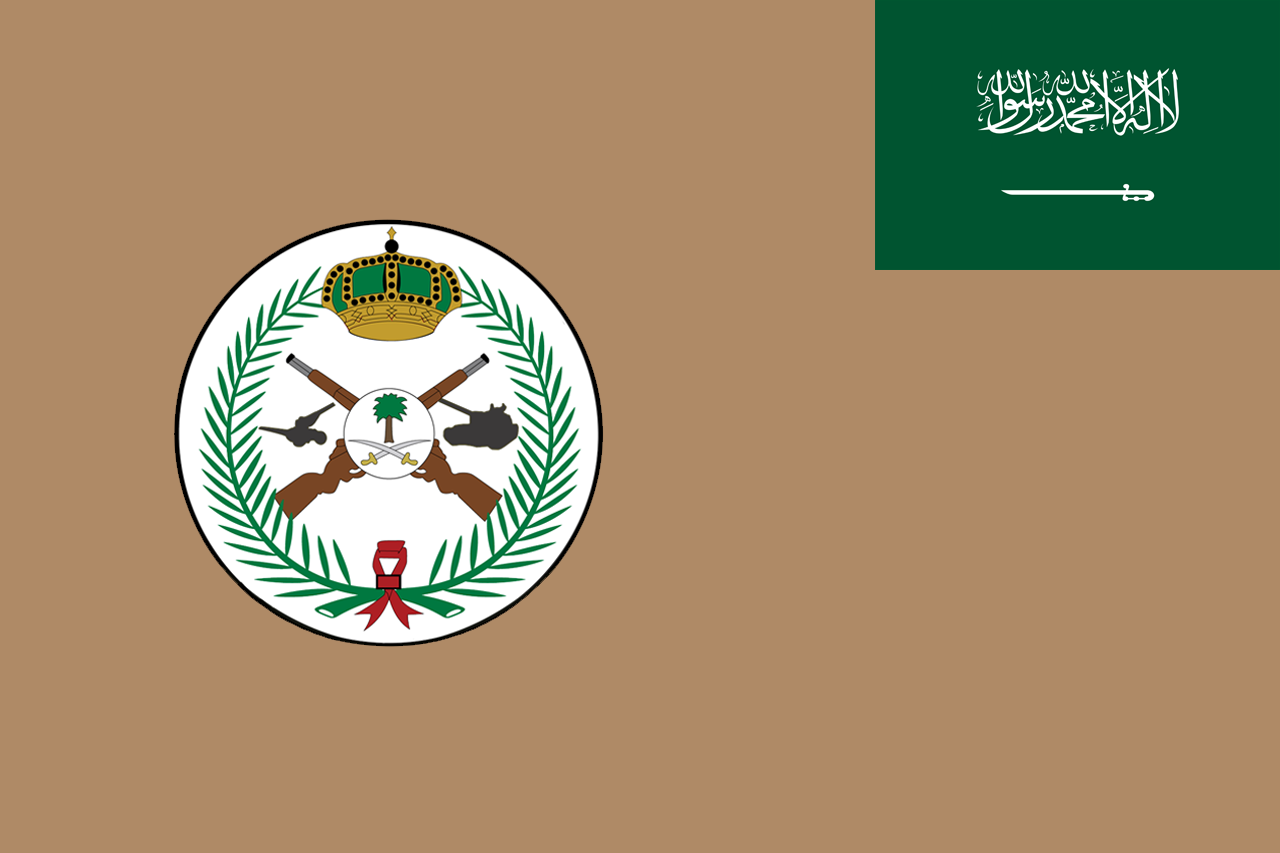
Saudi Arabian Army

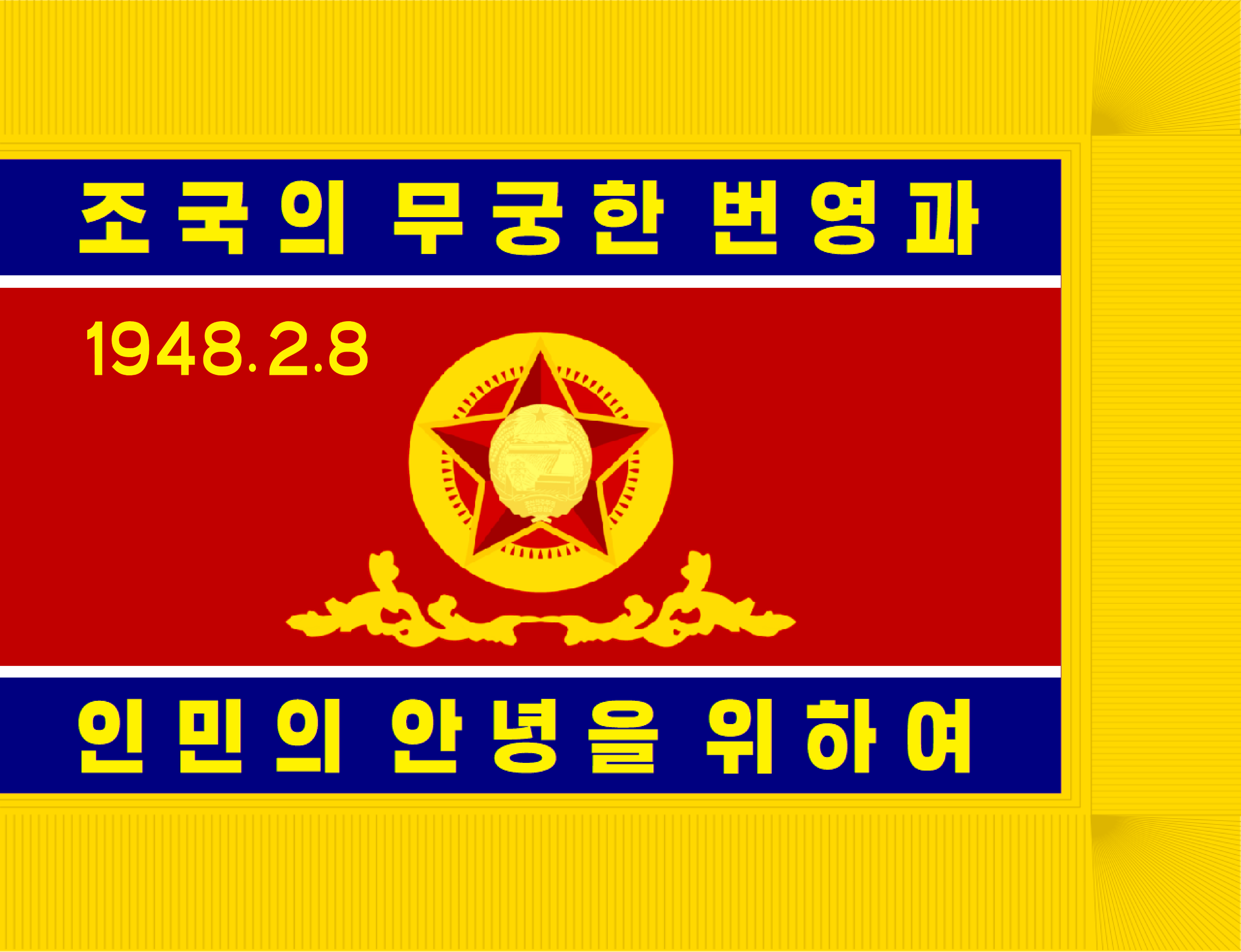
Korean People's Army Ground Force

Republic of Korea Army

Royal Thai Army

Ukrainian Ground Forces

United States Army's field flag

Flag of the Vietnam People's Army

=== War flags that are also naval ensigns ===
State, war flag, and state ensign of Austria

State, war flag, and state ensign of Denmark

State, war flag, and state ensign of El Salvador

War ensign of Finland

State, war flag, and state ensign of Germany

State and state/naval ensign of Iceland

Naval Ensign of Japan

State/war flag and state/naval ensign of Norway

Flag of the Philippines at war

Flag of Saudi Arabian naval bases

War ensign of Sweden

Naval ensign used by the Royal Thai Navy

State, war flag, and naval ensign of Venezuela

== Former war flags ==
War flag of the Knights Templar during the Crusades

Flag of Bangladesh during Bangladesh Liberation War

The original Eureka Flag specimen, rebel warflag at the 1854 Battle of Eureka Stockade

Battle flag of the Confederate States (1861–1865)

Cross of Burgundy Flag, Spain (1506–1843)

War flag of the Imperial Japanese Army (1868–1945)

War flag of the People's Republic of Congo (1970–1991)

The "Gadsden flag", used by some Continental forces during the American Revolutionary War (1775–1783)

Battle flag of the United Irishmen, used at the Battle of Arklow

War flag of East Germany (1960–1990)

War flag of the German Wehrmacht (1938–1945)

War flag of the Chetniks (1903–1946)

War flag and ensign of Iran (1925–1979), between 1910 and 1925 the Kiani Crown was used instead of Pahlavi Crown

War flag of the Italian Social Republic (1943–1945)

War flag of Prussia (1816)

War flag of the German Empire (1903–1919)

War flag of the Roman Republic of 1849

Flag of the Red Army and Soviet Armed Forces (Unofficial)

Royal Siamese Army in Haw wars (1885–1890)

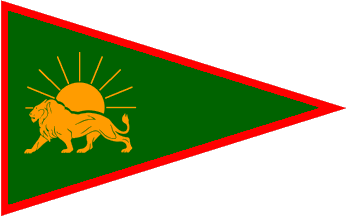
War flag of Mughals (1526–1857)

United States Cavalry guidon.

War flag of the Royal Italian Army

War ensign of the Slovak Republic (client state of Nazi Germany 1939–1945)

War flag of the Independent State of Croatia (client state of Nazi Germany 1941–1945)

War flag of the Royal Hungarian Army (1939–1945)

Royal Yugoslav Army

Royal Yugoslav Navy

Yugoslav Ground Forces

Yugoslav Navy

Federal Republic of Yugoslavia Navy

War flag of Zaire

Vietnam People's Army battle flag and victory banner during the First Indochina War

Republic of Vietnam Military Forces war flag

Military flag of the Liberation Army of South Vietnam

War flag used by the Boxer Movement during the Boxer Rebellion

Flag and War flag of the Vermont Republic, also known as the Flag of the Green Mountain Boys

War flag used by the Hiroshima Domain in the Boshin War

Naval ensign of George Washington's squadron of six schooners also known as the Pine Tree Flag

== See also ==
- Colours, standards and guidons
- Hata-jirushi
- Sashimono
- Uma-jirushi
