= Flag of the People's Liberation Army =

Flag used by China's military

Chinese People's Liberation Army
- Use: War flag and naval jack
- Proportion: 4:5
- Adopted: 15 June 1949
- Design: A Chinese red field with a yellow star at the canton, and the Chinese numerals for "8" and "1", the date of the PLA's establishment on August 1, 1927.

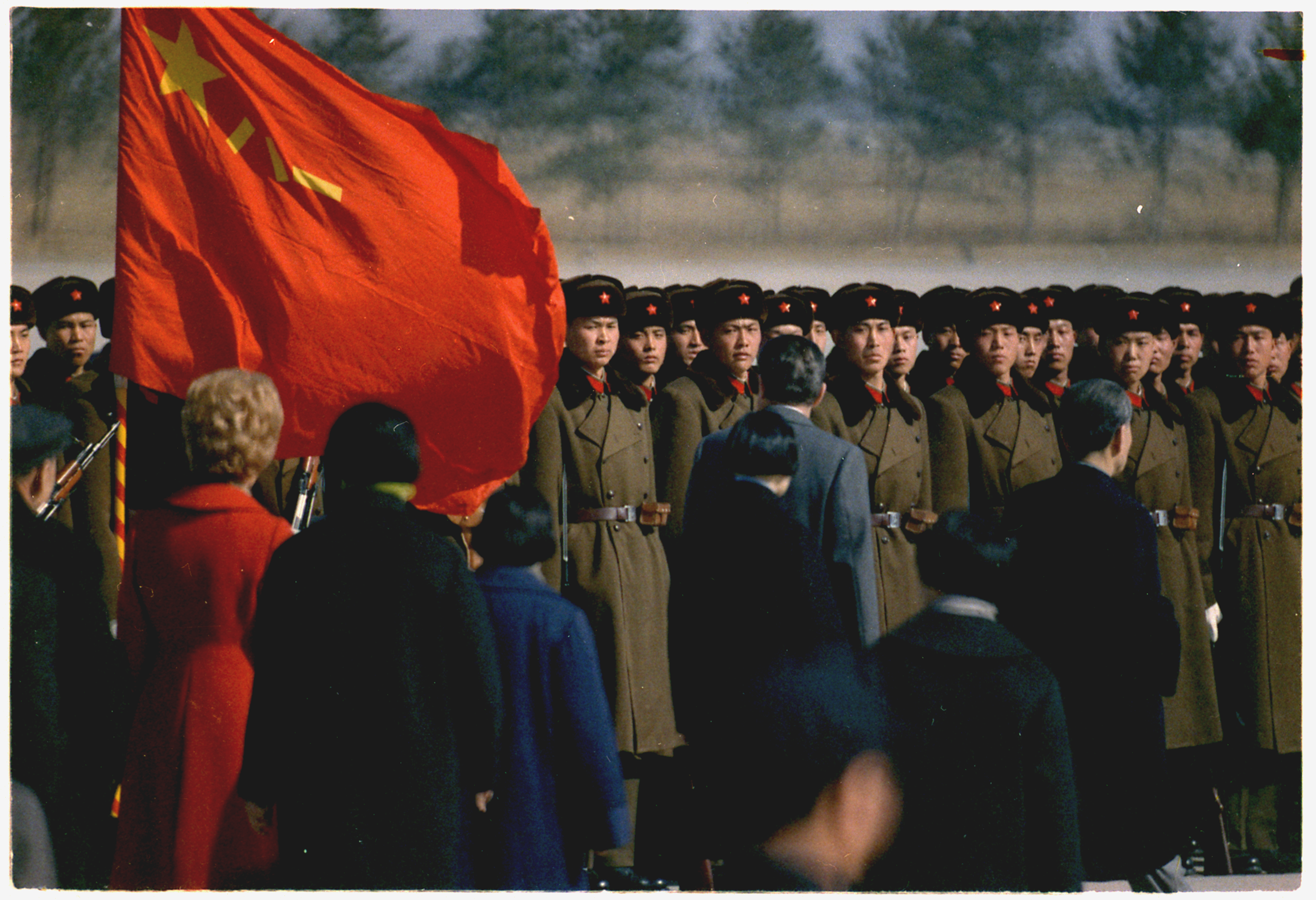
PLA flag during Nixon's visit to China

The flag of the Chinese People's Liberation Army is the war flag of the People's Liberation Army; the layout of the flag has a golden star at the top left corner and two Chinese characters "八一" to the right of the star, placed on a red field. The characters "八一" (literally "eight one") are a reference to the events of August 1, 1927 (8th month, 1st day, also known as 8月1日); when the PLA was created by the Chinese Communist Party at the start of their rebellion in Nanchang against the Nationalist government.

== History ==
Based on a decree issued from Mao Zedong, the main flag of the PLA was created on 15 June 1949.

== Design ==
The flag has a ratio of 5 by 4, which has a white sleeve measuring 1/16 of the flag's length. For ceremonies, a PLA flag with golden fringe is placed on a pole with gold and red spiral stripes and topped with a golden finial and red tassel. Each branch of the PLA, the Ground Forces, Navy, Air Force, Rocket Force, also have their own individual flags. In a 1992 order, the flags of the three branches were defined: the top 5/8 of the flags is the same as the PLA flag; the bottom 3/8 are occupied by the colors of the branches. The flag of the Ground Forces has a forest green bar at the bottom, the naval ensign has stripes of blue and white at the bottom, the Air Force uses a sky blue bar at the bottom, the Rocket Force uses a yellow bar at the bottom. The forest green represents the earth, the blue and white stripes represent the seas, the sky blue represents the air, the yellow represents the flare of missile launching.

On 10 January 2018, the People's Armed Police received a new flag following the design of the branch flags with three olive stripes at the bottom. The three olive stripes represent the People's Armed Police responsible for the three main tasks and force composition of maintaining national political security and social stability, maritime rights protection and law enforcement, and defense operations.

On 1 August 2025, the branch flags for the four PLA Arms were revealed, which include the flags for the Aerospace Force, Cyberspace Force, Information Support Force, and Joint Logistics Support Force.

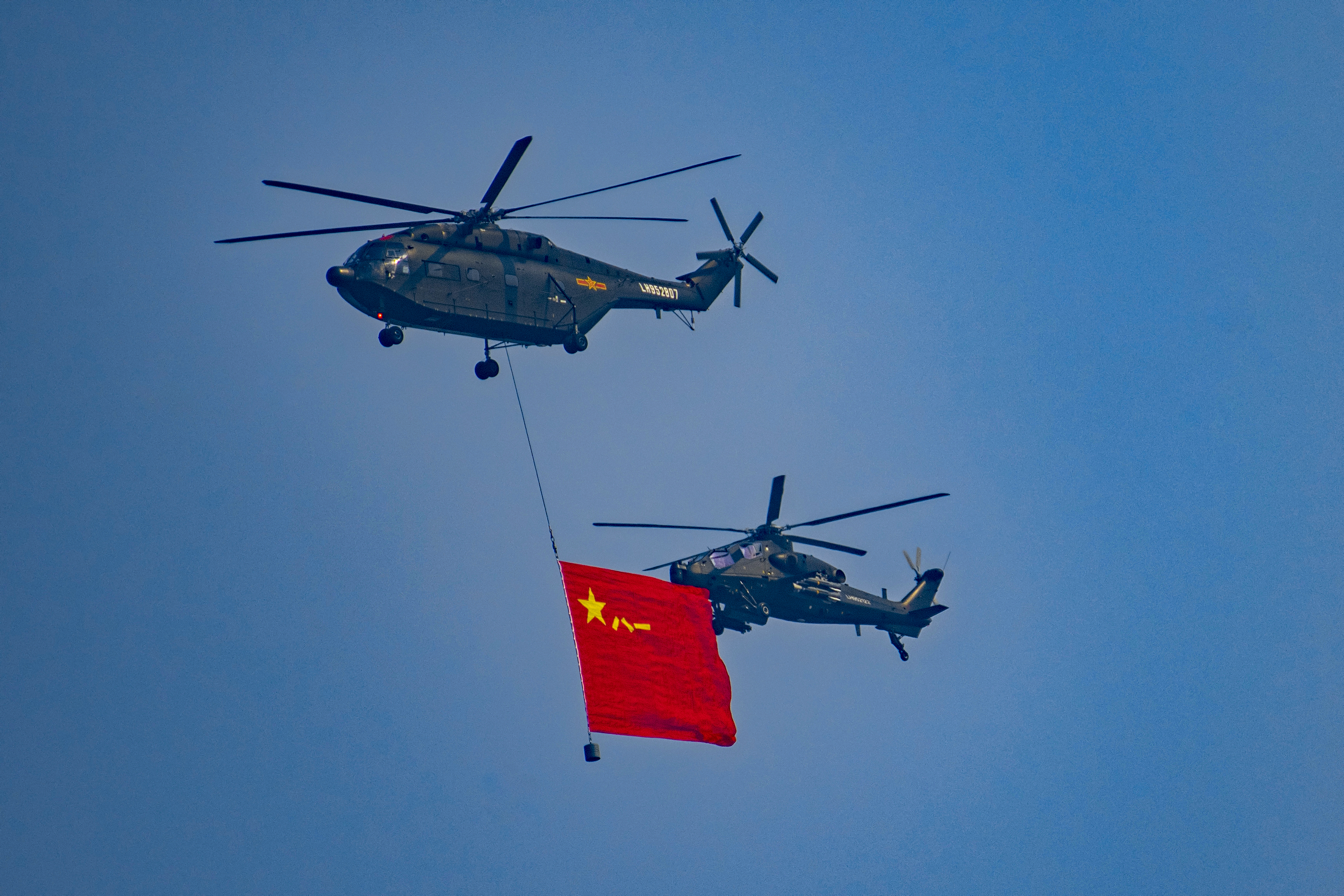
The flag during the 70th anniversary of the PRC

== Flags of the armed forces ==
=== People's Liberation Army ===
Flag of the People's Liberation Army
Services

Flag of the People's Liberation Army Ground Force

Flag of the People's Liberation Army Navy

Flag of the People's Liberation Army Air Force

Flag of the People's Liberation Army Rocket Force
Arms

Flag of the People's Liberation Army Aerospace Force

Flag of the People's Liberation Army Cyberspace Force

Flag of the People's Liberation Army Information Support Force

Flag of the People's Liberation Army Joint Logistics Support Force

=== People's Armed Police ===
Flag of the People's Armed Police Force
