= Tug (banner) =

Ensign with horse tails

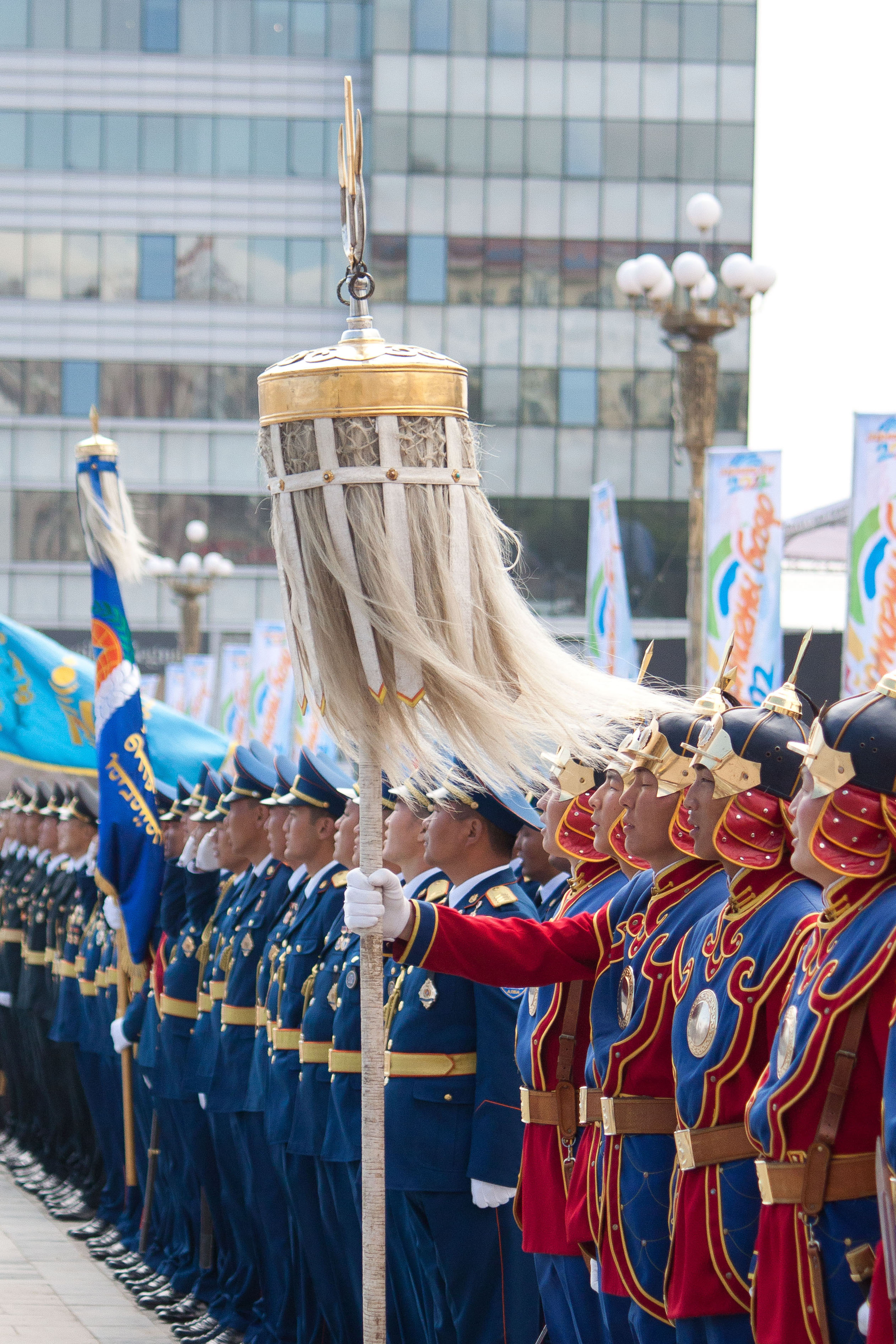
A white banner flown in Sükhbaatar Square, Ulaanbaatar

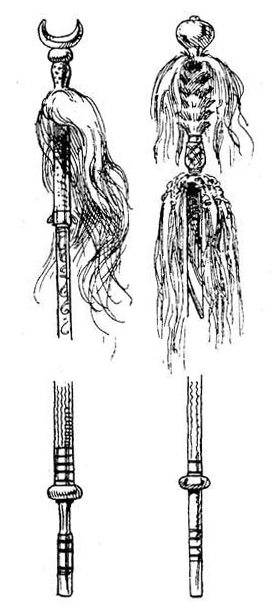
Ottoman Hungarian tughs (tugs) captured by Ferdinand II, Archduke of Austria in 1556

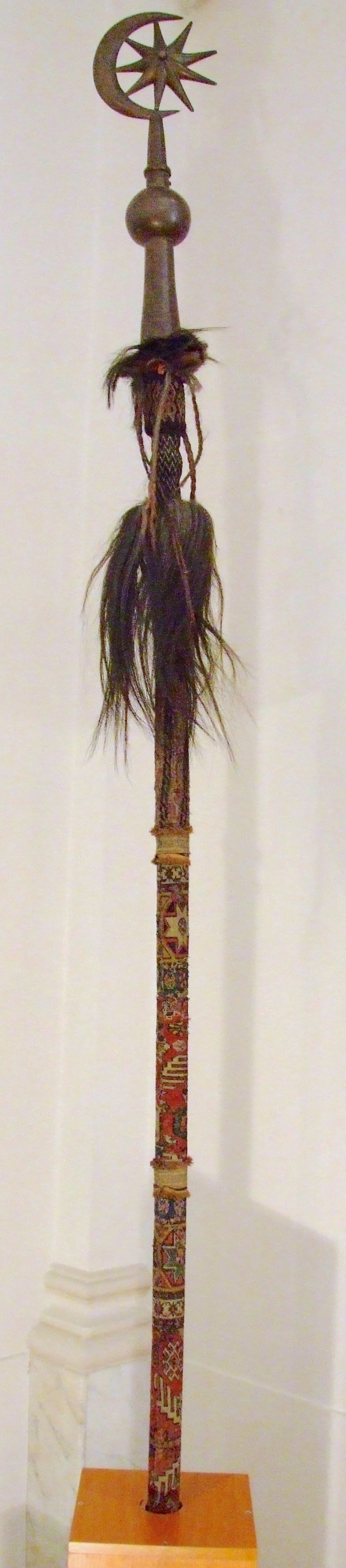
A 19th century Ottoman tugh

A tug (Mongolian: туг [tʰʊɡ], Turkish: tuğ, Ottoman Turkish: طوغ ṭuġ or توغ tuġ) or sulde (Mongolian: сүлд, Tibetan: བ་དན) is a pole with circularly arranged horsetail hairs of varying colors arranged at the top. It was historically flown during the period of the Mongol Empire and also by the Turkic tribal confederations such as the Duolu (Tuğluğ Confederation), and later used in derived Turco-Mongol khanates. It was also used by the Ottoman Empire, a state which was founded by Oghuz Turks. Among the Ottomans, the tug, as a sign of power and rank of pashas, was in use before the introduction of combat troops. Based on the number of tugs attached, a pasha was called "two-tug" and "three-tug." In the 17th century, it was also adopted by East Slav paramilitaries, the Cossacks and haydamaka, under the name bunchuk (Ukrainian: бунчук, Polish: buńczuk), which is the reflection of the original Common Turkic word bōnčuk. It is still used by some units of the Polish military.

== History ==
=== Early history ===
According to Gerard Clauson, the Turkic word tu:ğ, for traditional Turkic standards made from horse-tails or bunches of horse-hair, was borrowed from Middle Chinese *dok 纛 "banner, standard" (whose ancestor is Old Chinese *du:g (ZS) ~ dˤuk and one of whose many descendants is standard Chinese dú). In contrast, according to linguist Sevan Nişanyan, the author of the first etymological dictionary of Turkish, it is more likely in terms of cultural history that the Chinese word tu or dú is borrowed from Turkic or Mongolic. Annemarie von Gabain (1955) (apud Maenchen-Helfen, 1973) was inclined to derive Chinese 纛 *duok from Turkic *tuɣ; however, Otto J. Maenchen-Helfen thought that the loan direction had been apparently from Chinese into Turkic, as 纛 (GS 1016) was the same as 翿 dào < d'âu < d'ôg, "staff with feathers" (GS 1090z) 斿 (variant of 旒) liú ~ yóu < iâu < diôg "pendants of a banner" (GS 1080a) 游 liú ~ yóu < "pennon" (GS 1080f), which had been attested in the Classic of Poetry and Zuo Zhuan, centuries before the first appearance of the Xiongnu. Chinese observers stated that the medieval Göktürks displayed a tuğ decorated with a wolf's head at their camp's gate in order not to forget their origin from a she-wolf ancestress. A Western Turkic tribal confederation, the Duolu, was possibly named after tuğ, if Old Turkic Tuğluğ (𐱃𐰆𐰍𐰞𐰍), which was "mentioned in the Chinese annals under various names: Duolu MChnL tuet-lǐuk[...], Dulu 都陸 MChnL tuǝ-liwk, Duolu 咄禄 MChnL tuet-luk", means "have flags (banners), have standards".

It was also used by Mongolic tribes too. The white-haired banner is used as a peacetime symbol, while the black banner was for wartime. Usage of the horse tail is symbolic because horses were central to the Mongols' livelihood. This is similar to the use of horse tail hairs for the morin khuur. The original white banner disappeared early in history, but the black one survived as the repository of Genghis Khan's soul. The Mongols continued to honor the banner, and Zanabazar (1635–1723) built a monastery with the special mission of flying and protecting the black banner in the 17th century. Around 1937, the black banner disappeared amidst the great purges of the nationalists, monks and intellectuals, and the destruction of monasteries.

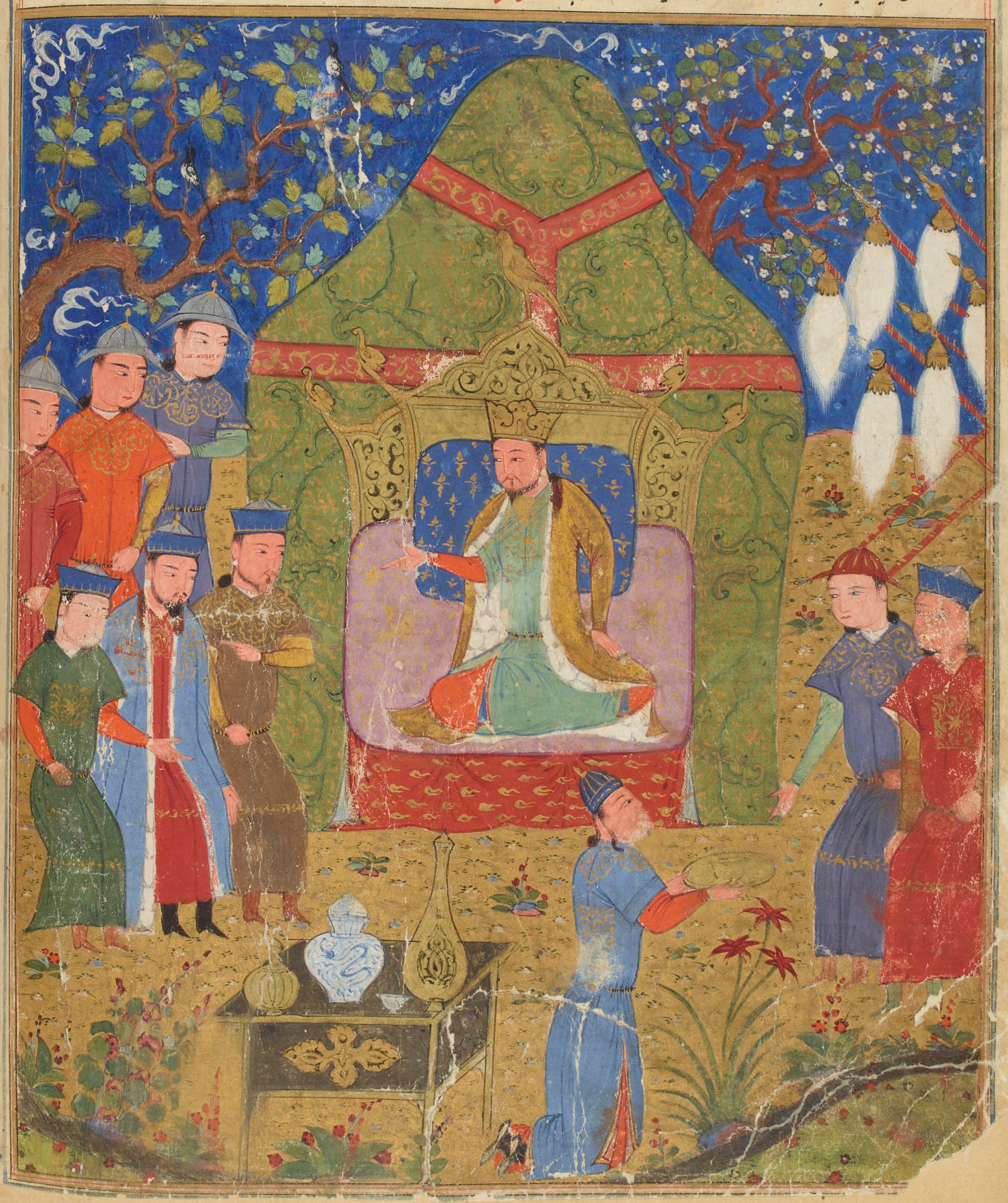
Genghis Khan proclaimed Khagan of all Mongols. White banners can be seen on the right. 15th-century ms. of Rashid al-Din's "History of the World" (BNF Supplément persan 1113, fol. 44v)

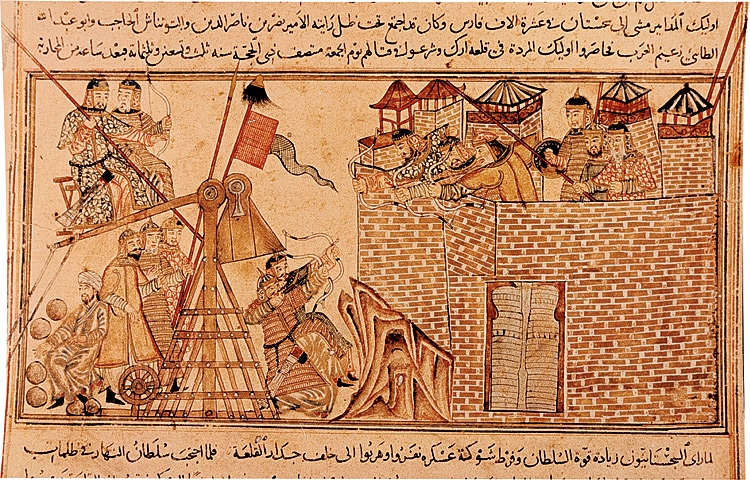
The Mongols besieging a city in the Middle East. The black banner can be seen behind the trebuchet, early 14th-century miniature from a ms. of Rashid al-Din's "History of the World" (Edinburgh University Library)

=== Modern era ===
==== The Nine White banners ====
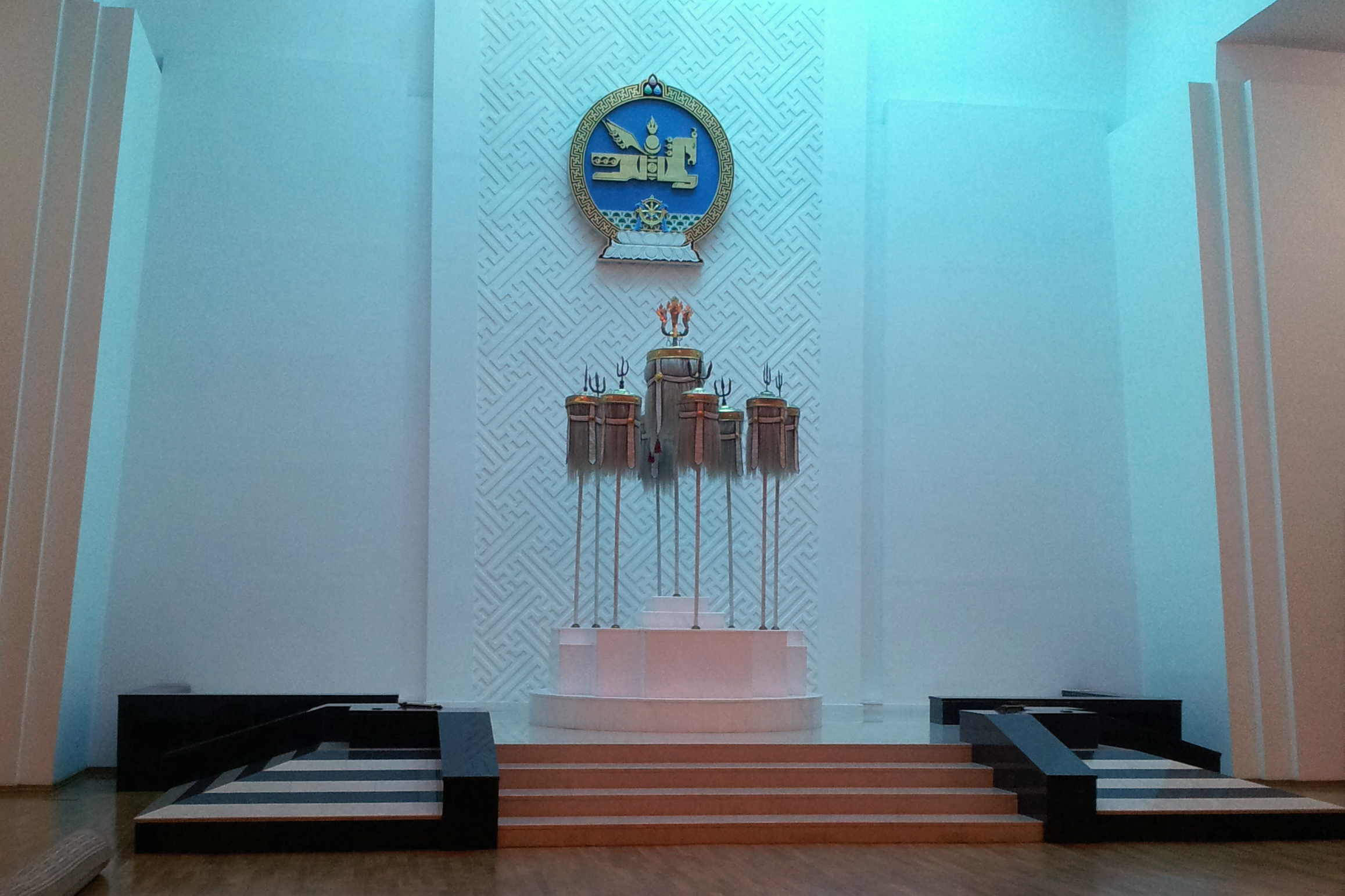
Nine White Banners inside the Government Palace

The Nine White banners came into renewed significance in Mongolia after democracy was adopted in the early 1990s as a symbol of the traditional Mongolian state, replacing the previous communist red flags.

The state banner flown by the Mongols, the Есөн хөлт цагаан туг, (Yesön Khölt tsagaan tug, 'Nine Base White Banners)', is composed of nine flag poles decorated with white horse tail hairs hanging from a round surface with the Mongolian symbol of the 3 pronged flame, which appears on the Soyombo (Representing the past, present, and future), on the top. The Nine White Banners was a peacetime emblem used exclusively by the Khans in front of their yurt. The central banner is larger in size than the rest and is placed in the center of the other eight. The modern Mongolian nine white banners are kept in the Government Palace in Ulaanbaatar. On National Pride Day, a traditional ceremony for the Nine White Banners is held.

==== Black banners ====
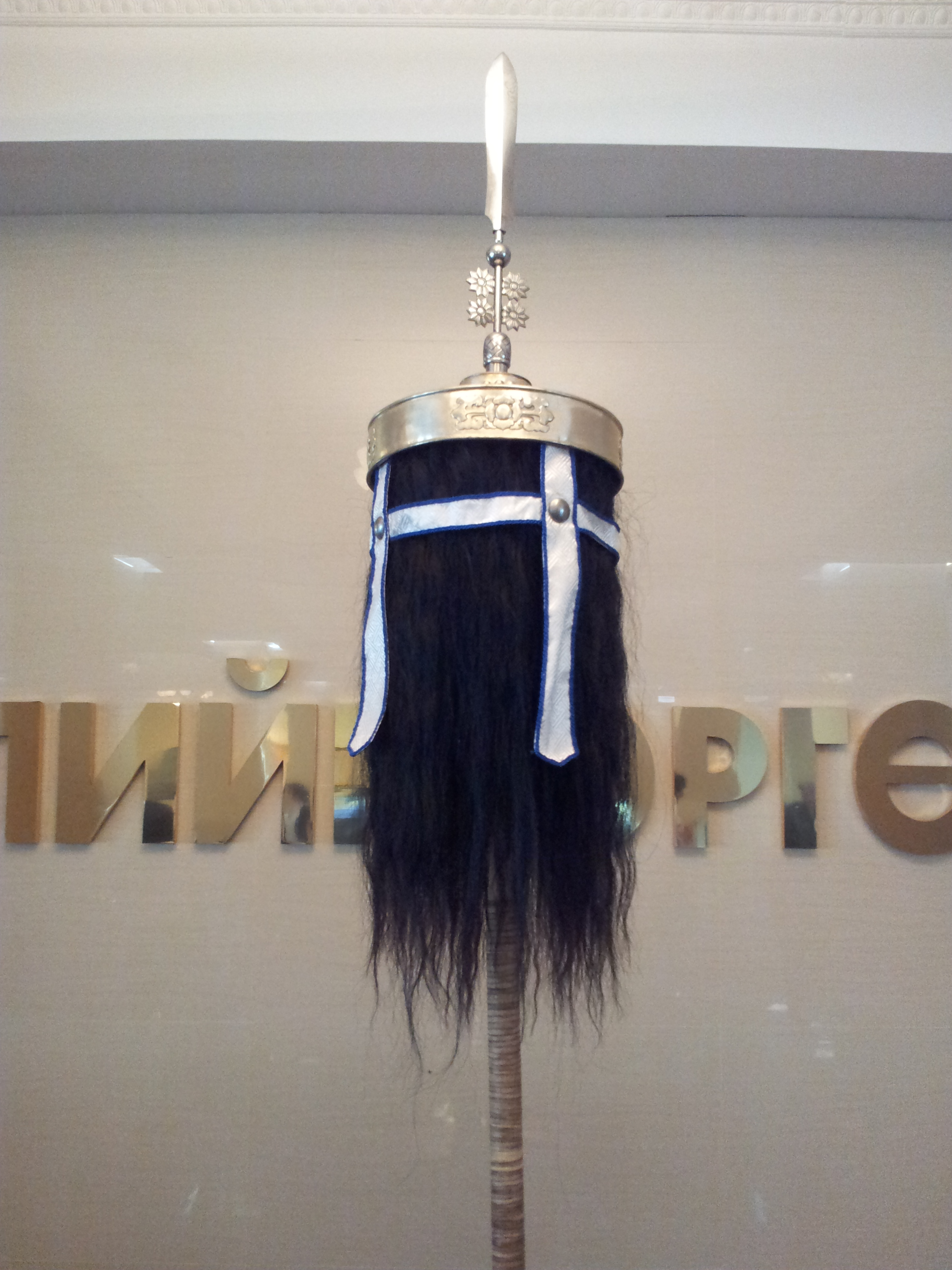
Black Banner inside the Government Palace

The Dörvön khölt khar sulde (Дөрвөн хөлт хар сүлд) or the lit. 'Four Base Black Banners' was used in wartime. It is made of black horse tail hairs and flown in the same fashion. According to the illustrated Japanese chronicle Mōko Shūrai Ekotoba, the banner of the Mongolian Yuan fleet that invaded Japan was black. The modern Mongolian black banners are kept in the Ministry of Defense.

==== Tugs in the Mongolian military ====
Within the Mongolian Armed Forces, the black tug is used as the finial in military colours' flagpoles, while the white tug is used by the Mongolian State Honor Guard and is the finial in the colours of the civil security services.

== See also ==
- Flag of Mongolia
- Historical colours, standards and guidons
- Banners of Inner Mongolia
- Dulo
- Tugh, another name for Shi'ite mourning banners
