= Nobori =

Japanese banner

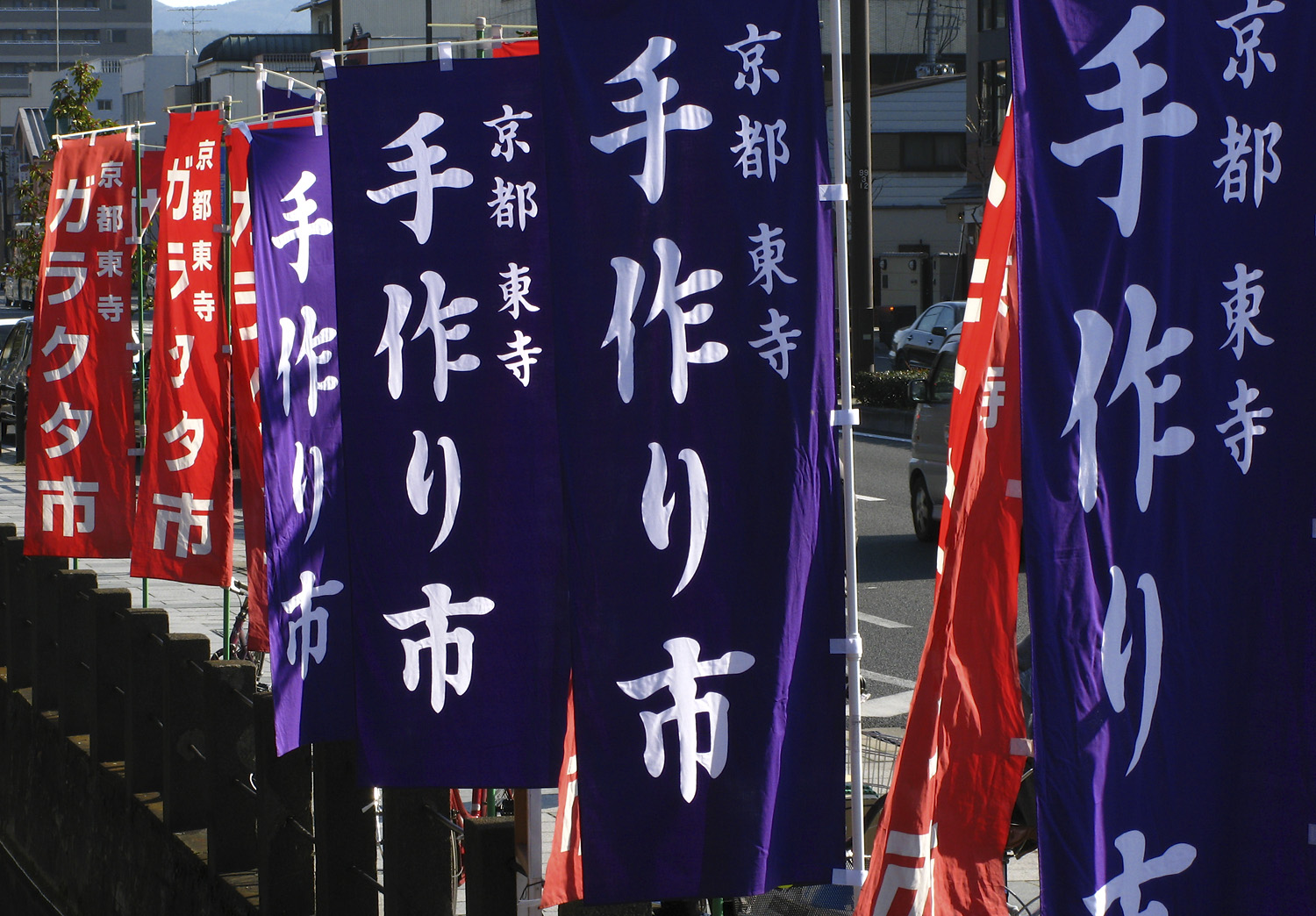
These colorful nobori outside Tō-ji announce a bazaar being held within the grounds of the temple.

Nobori (幟) is a type of Japanese banner. They are long, narrow canvas flags, attached length-wise to a pole. A cross-rod holds the fabric straight out to prevent it from furling around the rod; this way, the field is always visible and identifiable.

== History of use ==
The nobori were significant on the battlefields of feudal Japan. Nobori of the time were used to denote units within an army; they became much more common in the Sengoku period and were used alongside the earlier hata-jirushi. Though usually used to represent different divisions within an army, nobori were sometimes made identical, so as to produce an impressive and intimidating display of warrior flags.

Today, nobori are a common sight in Japan. Often, they are used for making announcements and advertising sales, products, or the name of a business; and can frequently be found outside retail stores, restaurants, and other businesses. Political parties also use nobori to identify themselves during election campaigns. In festivals and sports events, nobori are used in a similar fashion to the way banners and signs are used in Western sporting events. Shinto shrines or Buddhist temples may line walkways, fences or walls with nobori, frequently bearing the names of donors or deceased parishioners. In recent years, nobori influenced flags are gaining popularity around the world.

== Gallery ==
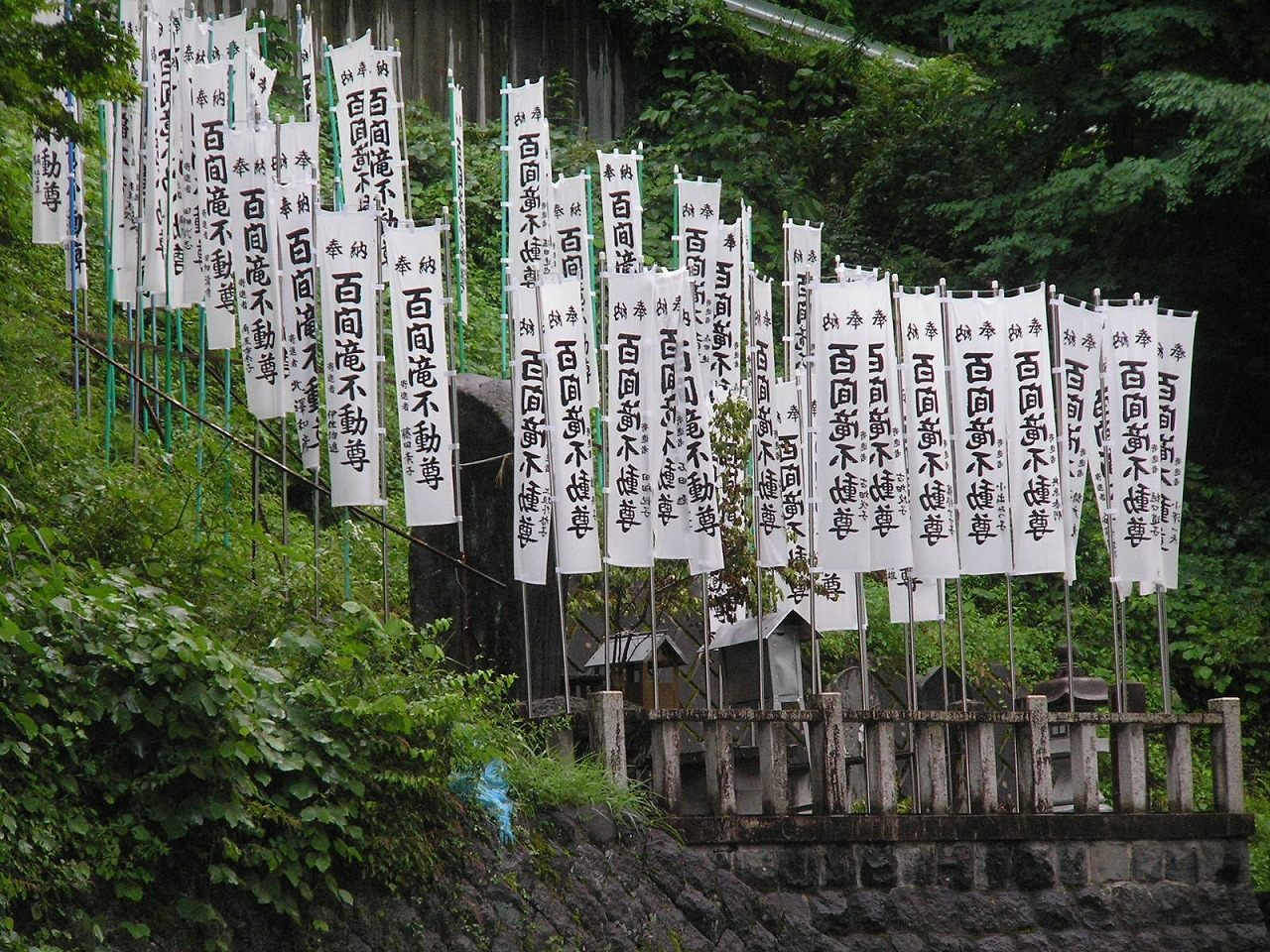
Nobori at a Shinto shrine

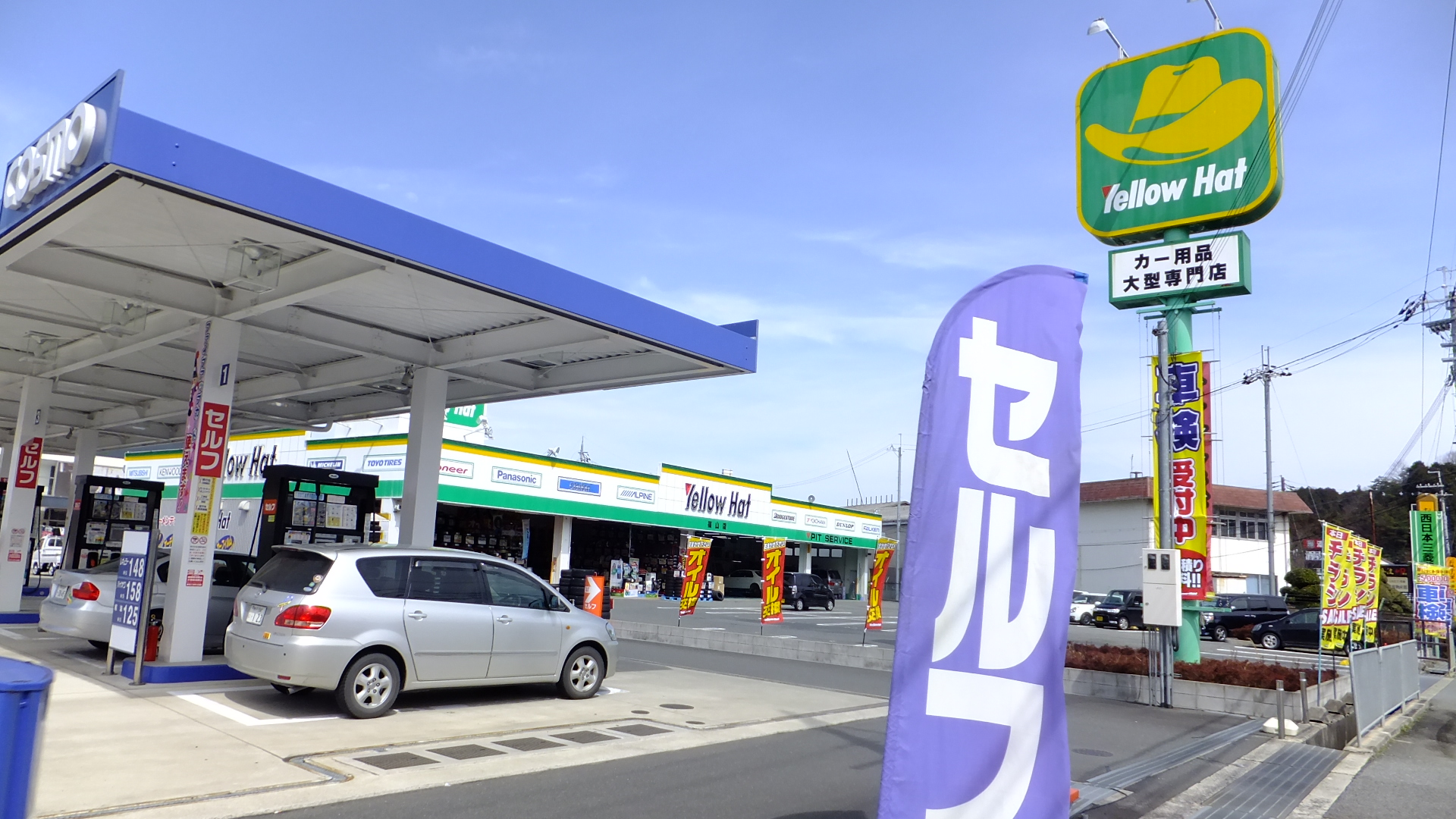
A curved nobori used to advertise a Cosmo petrol station

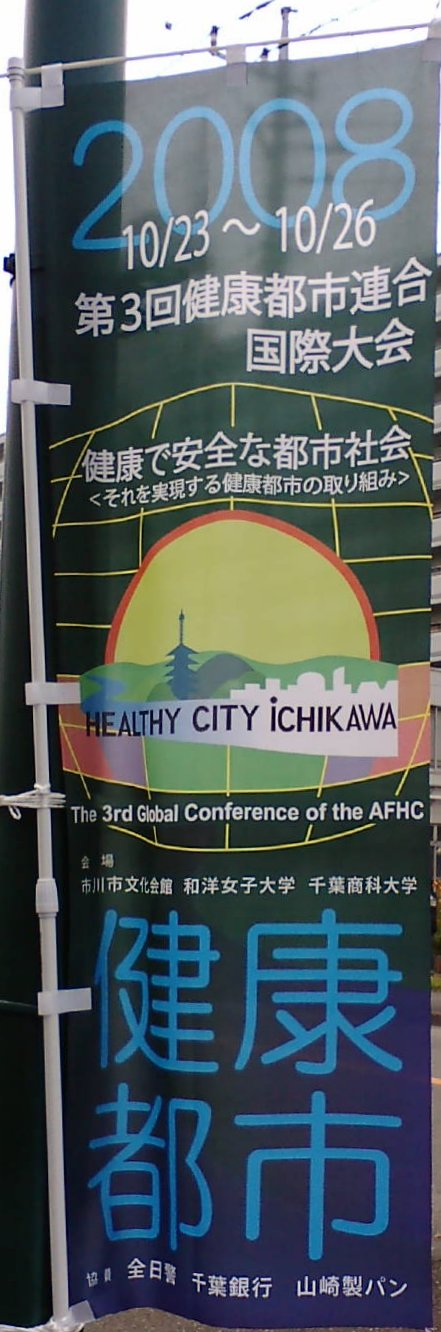
Advertisement of an AFHC conference

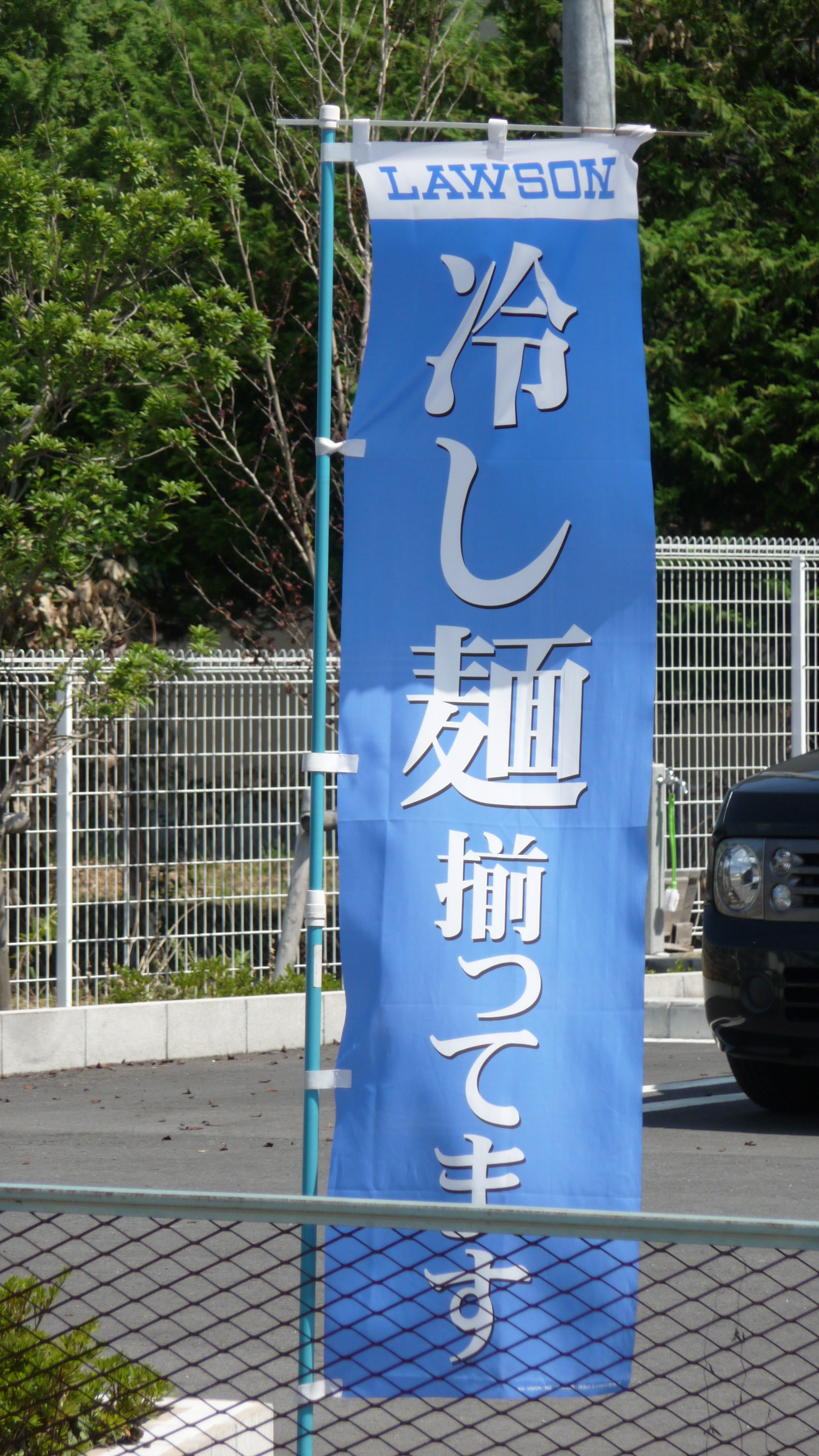
A nobori advertising chilled noodles sold at a Lawson convenience store

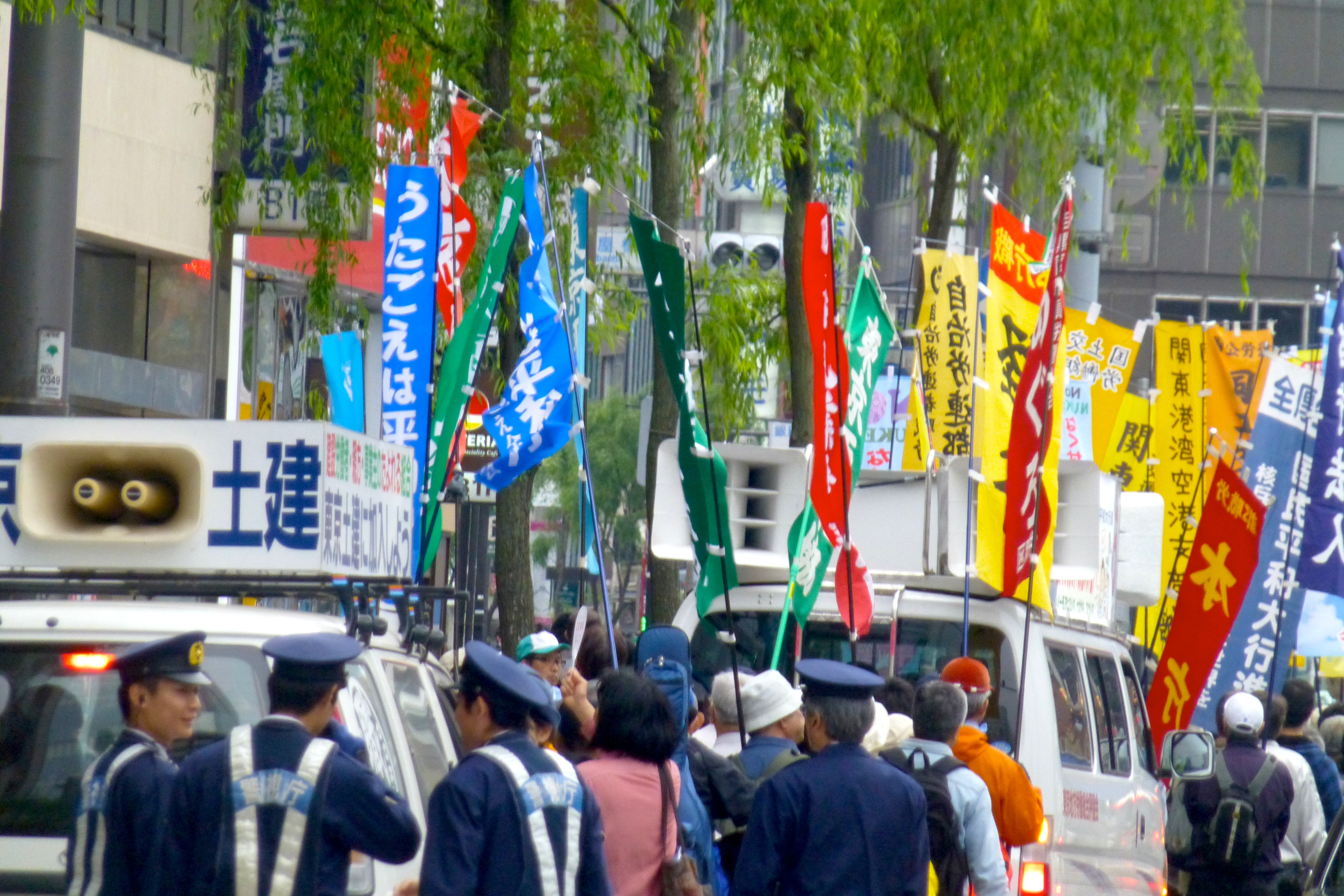
Nobori held by a group of pro-Article 9 demonstrators near Ginza

== See also ==
- Koinobori – fish-shaped streamers flown on Kodomo no hi (Children's Day)
- Sashimono – small banners worn on the back of ashigaru foot soldiers and samurai
- Uma-jirushi – large heraldic banners of daimyōs or commanders
- Umbul-umbul – slightly similar Indonesian vertical banner, common in Java and Bali.
