= Uma-jirushi =

Flag used to identify important military leaders

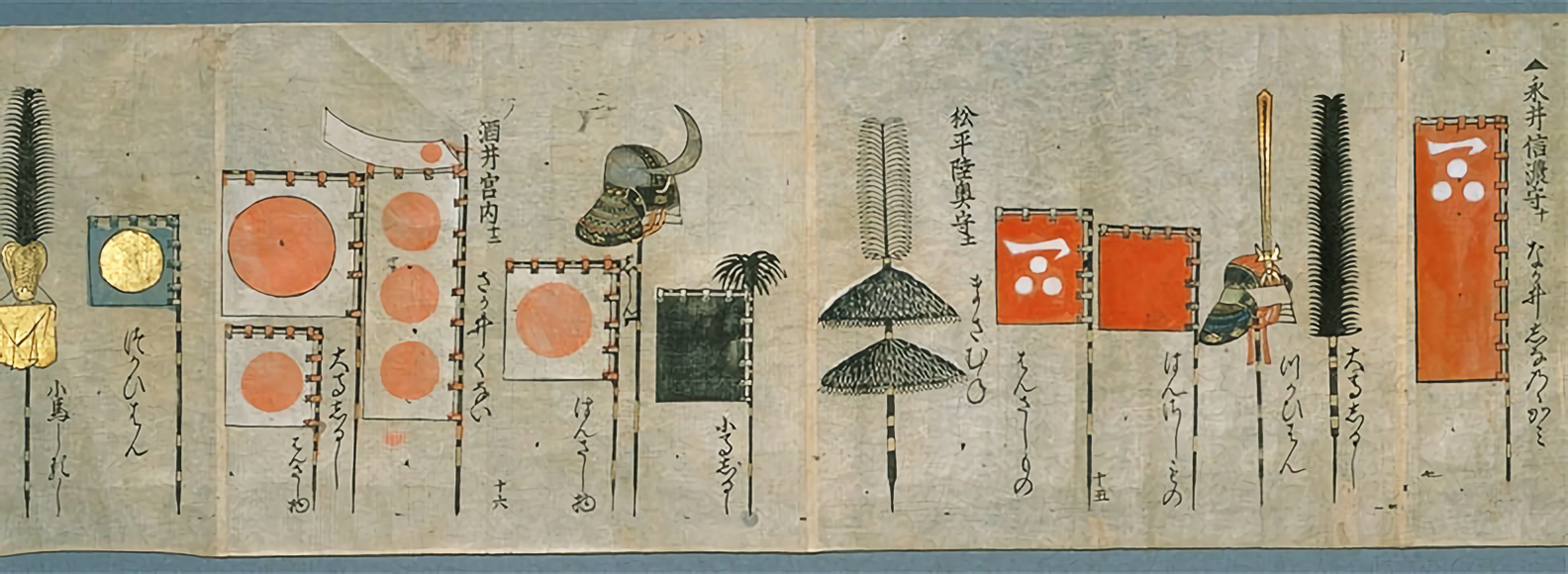
A variety of Uma-Jirushi designs, taken from the 17th century book O Uma Jirushi. For other pages from this book see the collection of Japanese heraldry images or collection of Uma-Jirushi images.

Uma-jirushi (馬印; horse insignia) were massive flags used in feudal Japan to identify a daimyō or equally important military commander on the field of battle. They came into prominence during the Sengoku period. While many were simply large flags, not very different from sashimono or hata-jirushi, most were three-dimensional figures, more like kites, and in the shape of bells, gongs, umbrellas, or streamers.

While these standards took many forms, they all fall into two broad categories: the ō-uma-jirushi and the ko-uma-jirushi, the great standard and the lesser standard respectively. Poorer daimyo had just one, the lesser standard, while wealthier daimyo had both. In 1645, the Tokugawa shogunate formalized this, allowing daimyo with an income above 1300 koku to have a ko-uma-jirushi, and daimyo earning more than 6000 koku to have an ō-uma-jirushi as well.

The ō-uma-jirushi was the nucleus of action on the battlefield, and while it aided the organization and morale of friendly troops, it also attracted the attention of enemy warriors. The carrier of the uma-jirushi, therefore, was arguably the most dangerous position to be in on the field. The ō-uma-jirushi was sometimes held in a leather bucket attached to the carrier's belt; the especially large ones would often be securely strapped into a carrying frame on the warrior's back. The carrier was provided with ropes to steady the standard in the wind, or while running.

In the mid-1600s, a monk called Kyūan completed a text called O Uma Jirushi, a comprehensive illustrated survey of the heraldry of his time. This text describes the heraldry of most, if not all, of the major samurai families of the battles of the Sengoku period. The text still survives today, and remains one of the chief sources of heraldic information available today on this period in Japan.

== Photo gallery ==
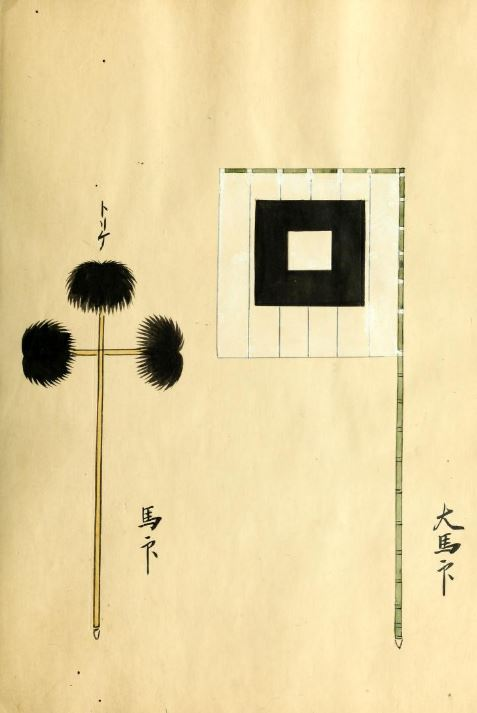
Arima Toyouji Large Battle Standards: black square on white base (right), triple black feather balls (left)

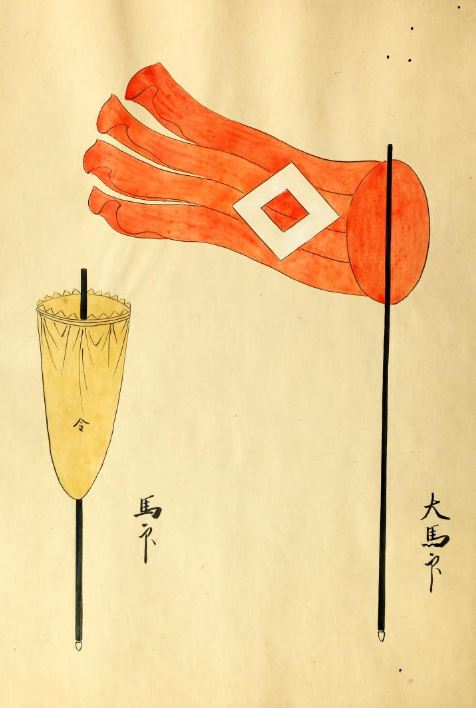
Hori Naoyori Battle Standards: white diamond on vermilion windsock (right), gold pouch (left)

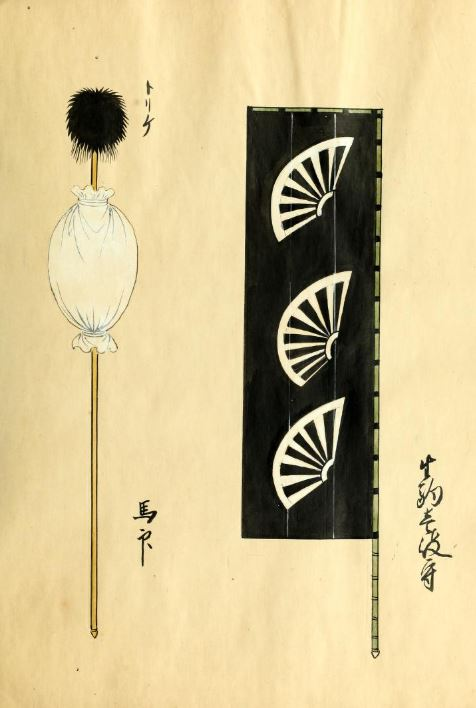
Ikoma Takatoshi Banner (right) of triple white half-wheel crests on black ground; Ikoma Takatoshi Battle Standard (left) of white bag with black feather ornament

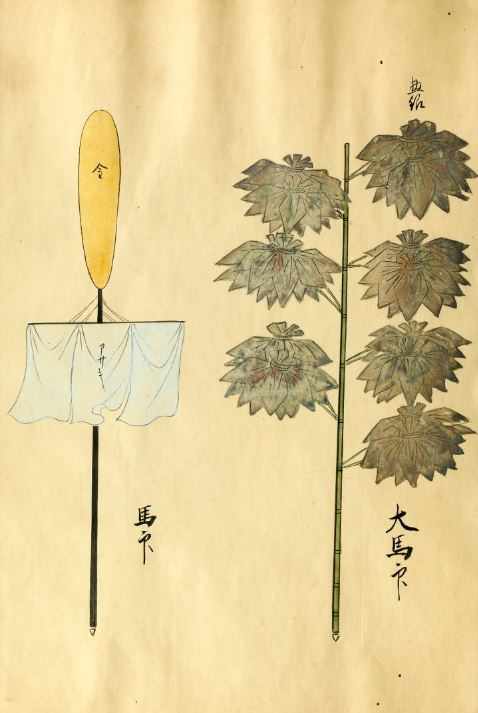
Matsudaira Mitsunaga Large Battle Standards: gold plaited paper on bamboo broom design (right), gold club over light blue curtain (left)

== See also ==
- Historical colours, standards and guidons
- Military colours, standards and guidons
- War flag
