= Hata-jirushi =

Japanese war banners

Date Masamune's Hatajirushi.(Black flag, and Black feather on top ) text: "小馬志るし"(ko-uma jirushi)

Hata-jirushi (旗印) were the most common of war banners used on the medieval Japanese battlefield. The term can be translated to literally mean symbol flag, marker banner, or the like. Unlike the later nobori, which were stiffened, these banners were simple streamers attached to a shaft by a horizontal cross-piece. Later, some hata-jirushi were hemmed on the sides to create a sleeve for a pole on the side and top, or had pieces of fabric attaching their side and top to poles to make the banners visible from the front. There are two variants of the hata-jirushi: One end of the cross-piece was attached to the shaft or the cross-piece was suspended from the shaft, similar to the vexillum.

Hata-jirushi served much the same purpose as the nobori, which replaced them, identifying and distinguishing regiments or sections of an army.

== Gallery ==
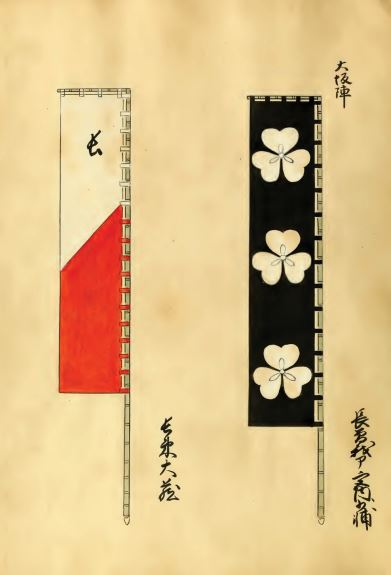
Chōsokabe Morichika hata-jirushi; Natsuka Masaie (1562?–1600) hata-jirushi

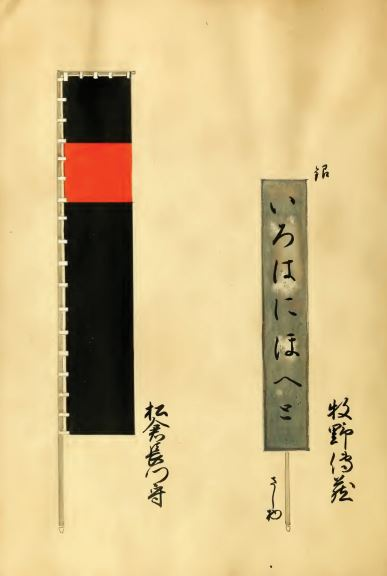
Makino Narizumi Personal Standard; Matsukura Katsuie (1597–1638) hata-jirushi

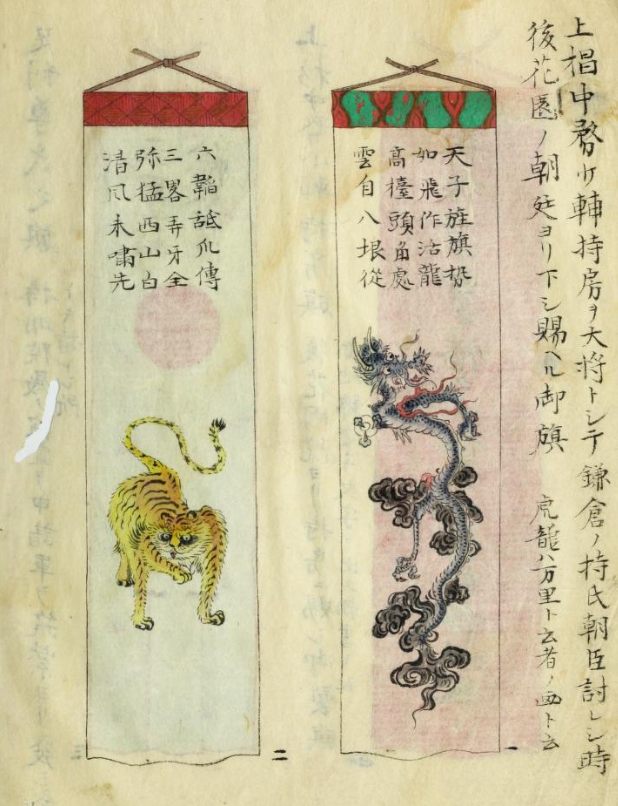
Uesugi Mochifusa, two banners, dragon and tiger. Traditional style hata-jirushi.

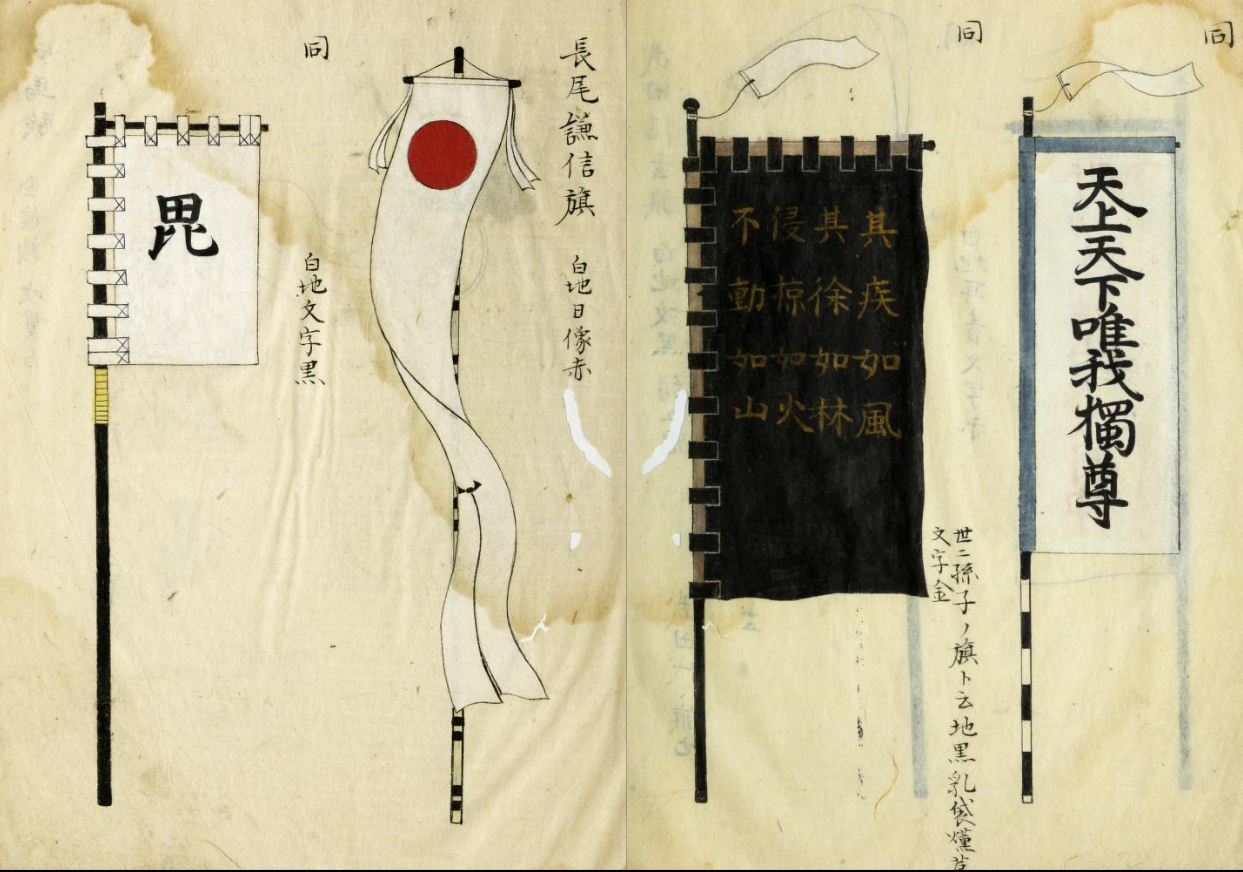
Right to left: Takeda Shingen, hata-jirushi, Hata-jirushi, black ground with gold lettering, Nagao (Uesugi) Kenshin, hata-jirushi, red sun on white ground with white ear pendants, hata-jirushi, white ground with black character "bi" signifying Bishamonten, a warrior deity. Note the different styles of hata-jirushi.

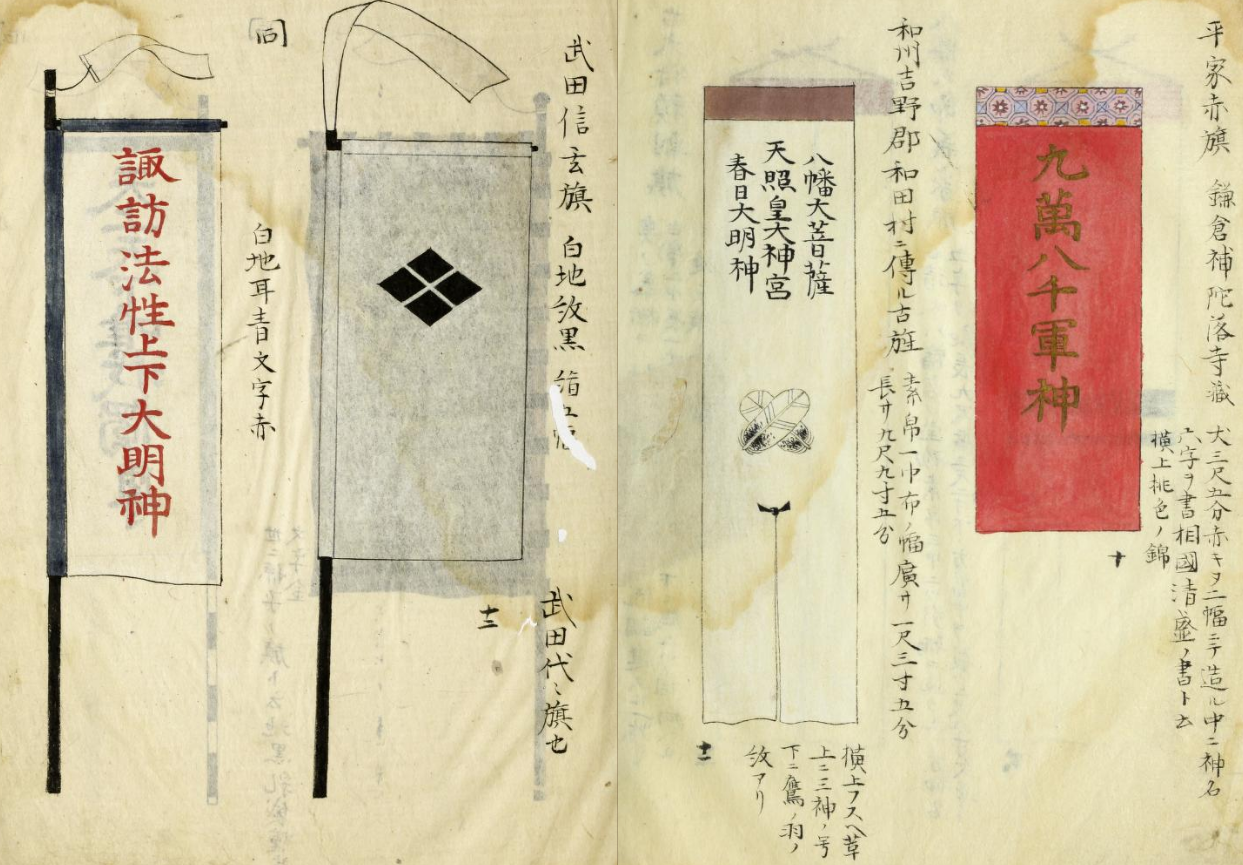
From right to left: Red banner of the Taira clan, Old banner found in Wada village of Yoshino county Yamata province, Takeda Shingen hata-jirushi, white ground with black four-diamond crest and white pendant used for generations by the Takeda family, Hata-jirushi, white ground with blue border, white pendant, and red lettering.

Fūrinkazan banner

== See also ==
- Historical colours, standards and guidons
- Military colours, standards and guidons
- War flag
