= Sashimono =

Banner worn by medieval Japanese soldiers for identification during battle

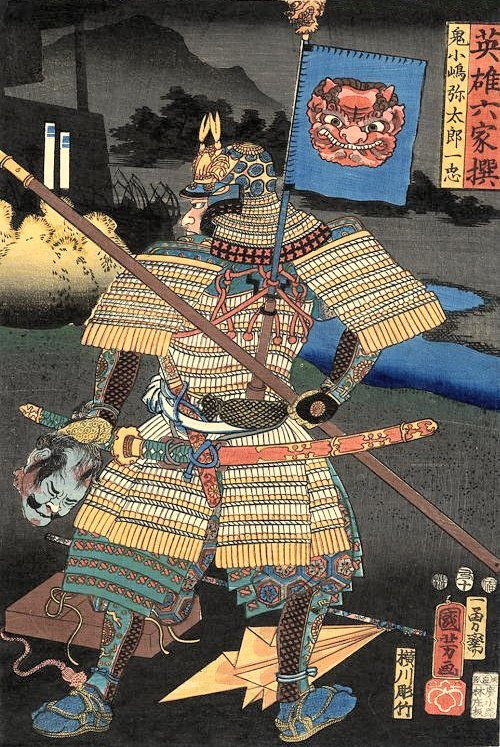
Kojima Yatarō wearing a sashimono

Sashimono (指物, 差物, 挿物, meaning "thing that denotes" or "thing that is inserted") were small banners historically worn by soldiers in feudal Japan, for identification during battles.

== Description ==
Sashimono poles were attached to the backs of the dō "cuirass" by special fittings. Sashimono were worn both by foot soldiers, including the common soldiers known as ashigaru, as well as by the elite samurai and members of the shogunate, and in special holders on the horses of some cavalry. The banners, resembling small flags and bearing clan symbols, were most prominent during the Sengoku period, a long period of civil war in Japan from the middle 15th to early 17th century.

== Variety ==
Given the great variety in Japanese armour, sashimono were used to provide a kind of "uniform" to armies. Sashimono typically came in either square or short rectangular forms, although many variations existed. A variation that is often bigger and coloured is the uma-jirushi, which were large, personalized, sashimono-like flags worn by commanders. Similar to this were the very large and narrow nobori banners, which commonly took two or three men to hold erect and were used to control the direction of fighting during large battles. (Uma-jirushi and nobori are still used today at sports events, as Japanese versions of the banners common among Western sports audiences.)

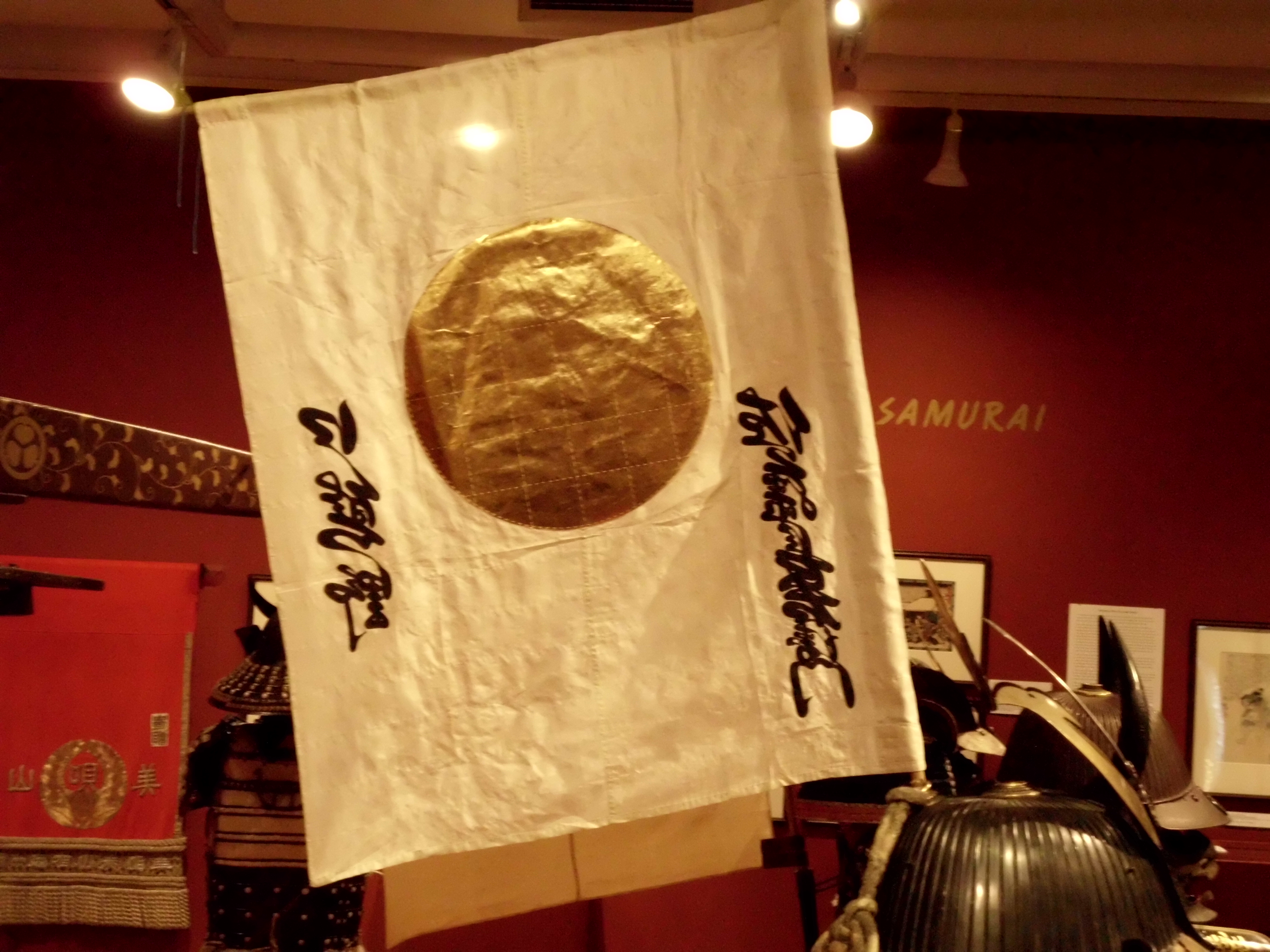
An Edo period samurai sashimono

The banner hung from an L-shaped frame, which was attached to the chest armour dō or dou by a socket machi-uke or uketsubo near the waistline and hinged at shoulder level with a ring gattari or sashimono-gane. While this arrangement was perhaps one of the most common, there were other variations. Silk and leather were the most common materials used.

== Design ==
The designs on sashimono were usually very simple geometric shapes, sometimes accompanied by Japanese characters providing the name of the leader or clan, the clan's mon, or a clan's slogan. Often, the background colour of the flag indicated which army unit the wearer belonged to, while different divisions in these armies emblazoned their own design or logo on it. However, the presence of the daimyō's mon was used more commonly than the design or logo of the unit, as battles could often get quite large and complicated; being able to recognize friend from foe at a glance is of the utmost importance in battle. Sometimes elite samurai, who were sufficiently famed or respected, had their own personal design or name featured on their sashimono as opposed to that of their division. These stylized designs contrast with the elaborate heraldic devices displayed by some European armies of the same period.

== See also ==
- Akira Kurosawa—Japanese film director who made a number of films set in this era, notable for their historically accurate costume design
- Heraldry
- Military colours
- Surcoat
