= Historical colours, standards and guidons =

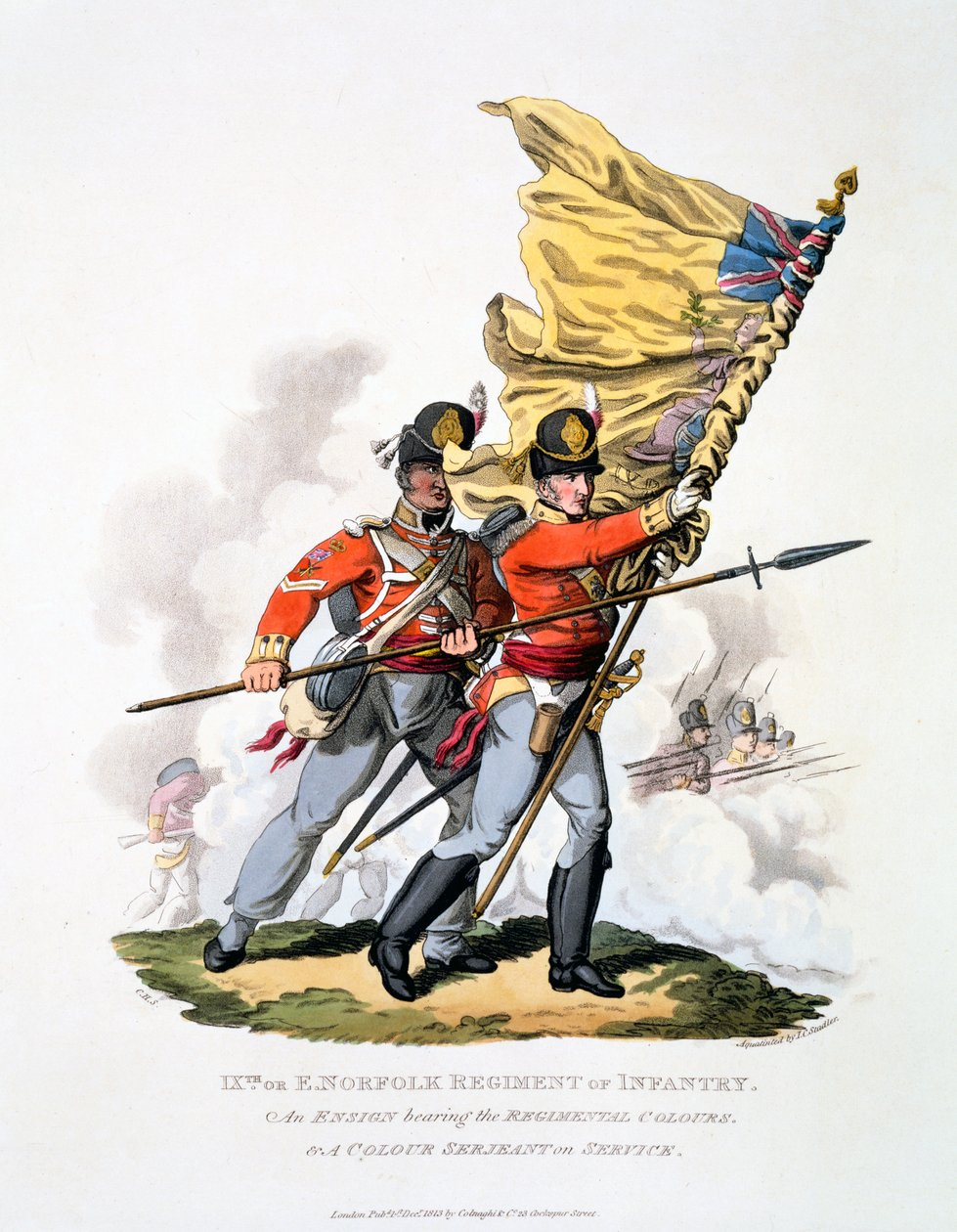
In the age of linear tactics, the unit colour was an important rallying point for the troop.

The following is a list of historical military colours, standards and guidons in different countries that do not exist today.

== France ==
=== Middle Ages ===
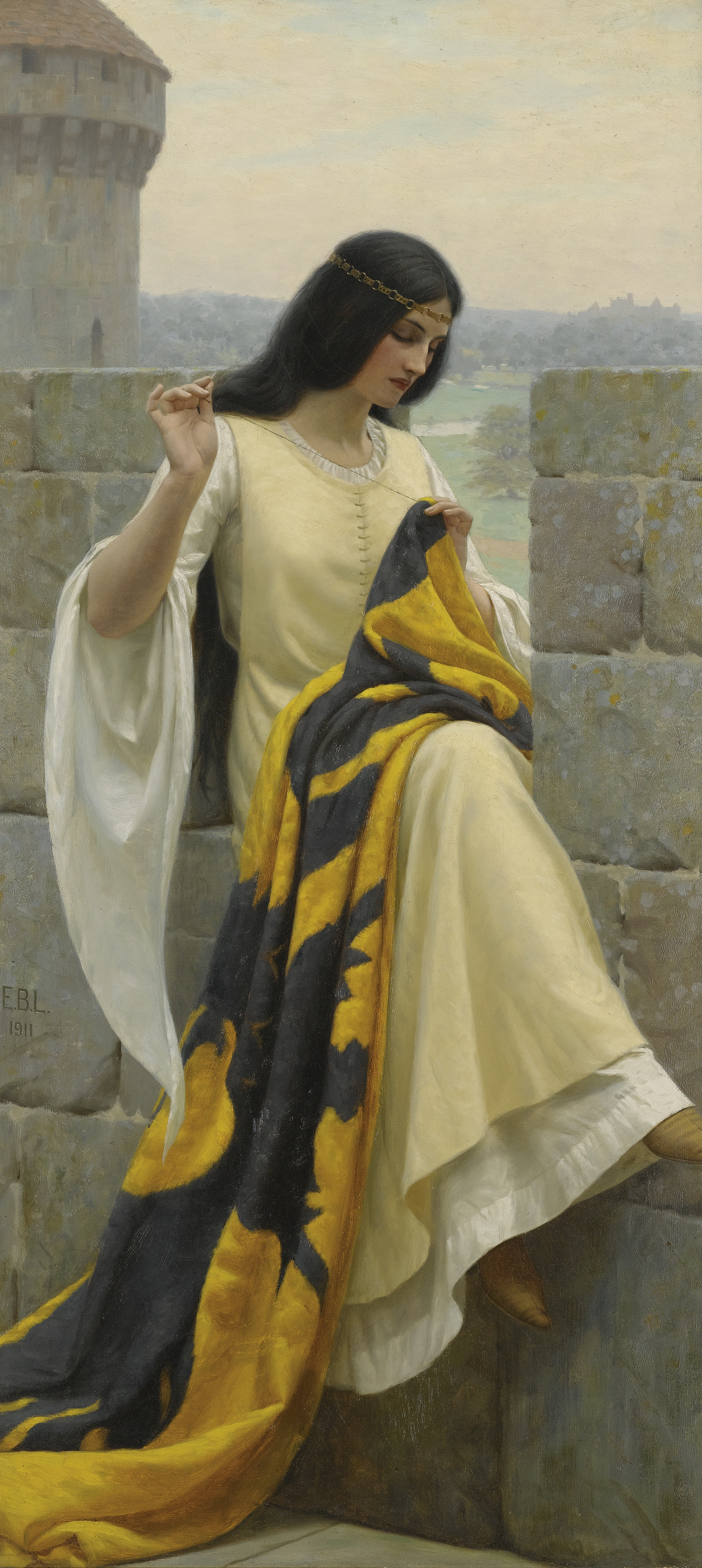
Stitching the Standard - oil on canvas (1911)

During the Middle Ages, units did not have specific colours attached to them; rather, they often wore the heraldry of their lord. The armies of France often used the fleur-de-lis, a symbol of the Capetian dynasty. The King of France also had an official battle standard, the Oriflamme: a special flag, red with gold, and the motto "Montjoie Saint-Denis". When the Oriflamme was taken into battle, it signified that there would be no quarter given to the enemy. English soldiers during the same time period sometimes wore Saint George's Cross as a symbol of identification.

=== Ancien Régime (15th-18th centuries) ===
The French colours of the Ancien Régime got the same design: a white cross, the Cross of France (vertical cross, but sometimes it was a St Andrew's cross, like the "Royal Deux Ponts" Régiment's flag). The rest of the standard was depending on the regiment. Often, the Cross of France divided the flag in four equal quarters. The quarters could have the same colour (specially for the Marine troops's flags). Sometimes, there were two colours: the top-left and the bottom-right quarters of one colour, the top-right and the bottom-left of another. In the most part of the time, lys flowers were on the Cross of France, with an inscription or a motto. The regiment often got the name of their province: Picardie (the oldest regiment of Europe), Normandie, Piemont, Provence... but were also called with special names, like "Régiment de la Reine" (Queen's regiment), which had a dark green and black quartered flag, with the cross of France. Each regiment had its flag. The colonel, at the head of the regiment, had a special flag: it also had the white Cross of France, but the four quarters were white too (white was the colour of the French monarchy). The actual flag of Quebec has exactly the design of the French colours of this time. The same pattern was used by regiments made up of foreign nationals who served with the Royal Army infantry.

=== Revolutionary Army ===
In 1794, the French Army was reorganised following the Revolution. Regiments were renamed demi-brigades, with three battalions in each. The 1st Battalion of each was raised from the volunteers, while the 3rd Battalion were conscripts. These two received identical colours. The 2nd Battalion meanwhile was formed from a regiment of the old Royal Army, and received a different colour from the 1st Battalion. The colours of all of the 2nd Battalions were identical to each other (except for the demi-brigade's number), while the 1st Battalions all received different colours.

=== Imperial Grand Army ===
In the Imperial Army under Napoleon I, regiments received new colours, which were called aigles (eagles), from the eagle that was mounted atop the pole. The designs differed per speciality.

==== Infantry ====
Up to 1812, the colours of infantry regiments resembled the colours of the Revolutionary Army, specifically the 1st Demi-Brigade of infantry, with a white diamond and the corners filled in (from clockwise top left) red-blue-red-blue. The name of the regiment was written in gold on the obverse, and the words Valeur et Discipline, together with the battalion number, on the reverse. The regiment's number was written in gold in the four corners. In 1812, a new pattern of colours was authorised; this used the French Tricolour, fringed in gold, and with various regimental and imperial devices forming a frame around the gold writing. The obverse bore the name of the regiment, while the reverse saw listed its battle honours. However, only those actions in which the Emperor himself had participated were permitted to be displayed, so some regiments had nothing on the reverse of their colours. Only the 1st Battalion of each regiment was issued with this Colour; subsequent battalions were issued with plain, coloured marker flags (a practice that began in 1809); although the regulations issued specifically prohibited the addition of any inscriptions or insignia, many battalions did so to allow them to stand out.

- Battalion Flag Colours after 1812
  - 1st Battalion - Regimental Colour
  - 2nd Battalion - White Flag
  - 3rd Battalion - Red Flag
  - 4th Battalion - Blue Flag
  - 5th Battalion - Green Flag
  - 6th Battalion - Yellow Flag
- The regiments of the Imperial Guard were subjected to a similar pattern after 1812, with the 1st Battalion of the senior regiments carrying the regiment's Colour, and subsequent battalions carrying plain red flags with either grenades (for grenadier regiments) or hunting horns (for chasseur regiments) in the centre and at the corners. The Middle and Young Guards infantry carried battalion marker flags as well.

==== Cavalry, artillery, military trains and engineers ====
From 1804 to 1812, the cavalry and artillery of the Imperial Army used similar designs for the unit standards. The line heavy cavalry regiments (cuirassiers and carabiniers) and all hussar formations, as well as the foot artillery companies, carried standards with similar inscriptions as the infantry while the line cavalry regiments of dragoons and the lancers and Chasseurs-à-Cheval, as well as the horse artillery, all had swallowtailed guidons. In 1812 the designs were unified, with both now having unit standards of the same design as the infantry with the battle honours. The regiments of engineers, as well as the pontoon units attached to the artillery, also carried infantry-style colours. The artillery and logistics trains, till 1812, carried swallowtailed guidons due to their mounted role.

In 1810, the standards and guidions of Imperial Guard cavalry formations raised before 1809 carried grenades or hunting horns in their colours depending on their role.

- French Colours prior to the Revolution
- French Colours from the Revolution onwards

== Germany ==
=== Kingdom of Prussia ===
Shortly after king Frederick the Great ascended the throne of Prussia in 1740, he began to issue colours of a new pattern to the infantry regiments of the Prussian Army. Under the new regulations, each regiment received two flags per battalion. The first battalion carried the King's Colour (leibfahne) and one Regimental Colour (regimentsfahne), while the second battalion carried two regimentsfahnen. The Leibfahne had a white field and the Regimentsfahne had a field in the distinguishing colour of the regiment. In the center of both colours was a circular tablet bearing the crowned Prussian eagle under a scroll inscribed Pro Gloria et Patria (For Glory and Fatherland), all within a wreath surmounted by the royal crown. The corners were decorated with crowned royal cyphers (FR for Fredericus Rex) The colours of the wreath, crown and cyphers could be either gold or silver. Unusually, Prussian infantry colours were longer at the hoist than on the fly, measuring 140 by 120 centimetres. Cords and tassels were silver and black. The colours were made of silk, with insignia painted on. The colours of the regular infantry regiments remained virtually unchanged from 1742 until 1806, when catastrophic defeat at the hands of Napoleon all but destroyed the once-proud Prussian Army. When new flags were issued to the reconstituted army beginning in 1811-12, their design was based on the original pattern, but with a number of modifications.

In cavalry formations, the same pattern prevailed, with the 1st Squadron or Battalion of cavalry (Cuirassier and Hussar since 1744) regiments carrying the King's Standard (Leibstandarte) and a Squadron Standard (Eskadronsstandarte). Dragoon regiments had swallowtailed standards (Leibfahne and Eskadronsfahne) in unit colours. The Garde du Corps had a Roman styled vellixum standard carried solely by the 1st squadron, while the other squadrons carried lances with the eagle finial.

=== Third Reich ===
The first model of the LSSAH Standard, all SS divisions have the same Roman vexillum style pole as the SA.

  - Army: The pattern of the colours for the German Army of the Third Reich was instituted in 1936. It encompasses a square white flag with a black Iron Cross extending nearly to the edges; the cross has a silver border followed by a thinner black edge and a white fimbriation; in each corner is a black swastika. At the center of the flag is a white disk surrounded by a silver wreath and containing a black ("Army type") eagle grasping a black swastika. The colour of the background varied depending on the branch of the service. Cavalry and artillery had the same pattern, but as a swallow tailed standarte (standard) rather than an ordinary fahne. Later, similar designs debuted for mechanized formations.
  - Luftwaffe: The ground troops of the Luftwaffe were given different colours to those of the army. It was either red (for anti-aircraft troops), yellow (for flying units) or green (for field troops), with a black lined white diagonal cross. On the obverse in the centre was an Iron Cross on top of a silver wreath. In each corner was a black swastika, with the whole flag trimmed in silver. The reverse was identical except for a silver (Luftwaffe type) eagle replacing the Iron Cross.
  - Navy: The colours of the Kriegsmarine were similar in design to those of the Luftwaffe. The flag itself was blue, with a black swastika replacing the eagle. The wreath was gold instead of black, as were the diagonal lines. In the corners were gold anchors (top left, bottom right) and Iron Crosses (top right, bottom left). On the other side was an Iron Cross in the centre, with gold eagles replacing the two Iron Crosses in the corners. The flag was fringed in gold. Similar colours were used by all ground formations of the service, including the naval infantry and artillery.
  - Waffen SS: The colours awarded to the Waffen SS infantry were completely different from those of the rest of the armed forces. It was essentially the national flag, fringed with gold, with the battalion and regiment numbers in the top left hand corner. Cavalry and motorized formations carried a swallowtailed variant. SS divisions, like the 1st SS Panzer Division Leibstandarte SS Adolf Hitler, based their banners from the earlier models, notably the SA "GERMANY AWAKE" (German: DEUTSCHLAND ERWACHE) banner; later the LSSAH replaced the early banner with a variant of Hitler's Personal Standard. All of the SS divisional banner poles are of the Roman vexillum style, as evident of the Moscow Victory Parade of 1945 flag throwing at Lenin's Mausoleum by the NKVD.

== Mongolia ==
In Mongolia, the Tug is generally regarded as a type of historical military symbol that is the equivalent to a military colour. It is a circular pole with attached horse or yak tail hairs arranged at the top. It was introduced and was flown during the period of the Mongol Empire, and was later adopted by Turco-Mongol, Turkic khanates and the Ottoman Empire.

== Portugal ==
=== Constitutional Monarchy ===
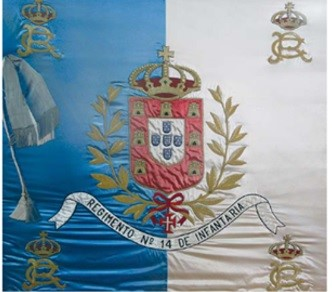
Historical colour of the 14th Infantry Regiment of the Portuguese Army

During the period of the Constitucional Monarchy (1834-1910), each of the regiments and other independent units of the Portuguese Army had a regimental colour, which was the variant of the then Flag of Portugal, the field being vertically divided in blue and white, with the Royal coat of arms in the centre, surrounded by two golden olive branches tied by a red ribbon carrying the Order of Christ Cross, and the royal cypher at each corner. Under the arms there was a white ribbon containing the number of the unit in the obverse of the colour and the regimental title in the verse. The colour was square with 130 cm each side.

The flags of the mounted units were similar, but were named "standards" and were smaller, with 80 cm each side.

== Russia ==
=== Russian Empire ===
Colours in the Imperial Russian Army were introduced in the 18th century. Large regimental flags were reserved for infantry units while small, easy to carry flags were used in the cavalry and horse artillery. Regulations in 1797 were introduced to give the military a guideline when awarding colours. New designs for regular infantry units were made, with the state color consisting of white with the state emblem and the assigned colors of the company/battalion/regiment using a different emblem.

In 1812 the former tradition, a Russian adaptation of the British practice, was replaced with the use of the regimental colour or standard as the sole colour for all units.

=== Soviet Union ===
Each unit in the armed forces of the Soviet Union had its own Regimental Colour, which was produced to a standard design from the 1930s onward:

- Obverse - red field, a red star yellow bordered and the full name and number of a military unit below. Each unit has its own inscription.
- Reverse - red field, a gold hammer and sickle and the motto "For our Soviet Motherland!" (За нашу советскую родину!, Za nashu sovyetskuyu rodinu)

All the Colours were red with gold fringe and square in form.

The former designs (issued from 1925) had a red star on the reverse with the name of the Central Executive Committee and later, the Supreme Soviet of the USSR surrounding it, and the obverse had the unit inscription below the State Emblem of the Soviet Union, which had the Soviet Union state motto ("Workers of the world, unite!") and the red star with the hammer and sickle inside (both were on the flag of the Soviet Union) above it (the latter was near the hoist). (Distinguished units would be given a second colour, the Revolutionary Red Banner of Honour, by the all-Union CEC (before 1924 by the All-Russian Central Executive Committee).)

The Naval Flags used by the Soviet Navy are white with a bottom blue stripe and were based on the naval ensign. Above it are the USSR's national symbols, the hammer and the sickle, beside the red star. If a naval unit is a recipient of the Order of the Red Banner, the medal of the order replaced the star.

==== Guards Regiments ====
The Colours of those regiments that were classed as 'Guards' was slightly different. These had the portrait of Lenin, the Za nashu motto and the abbreviation "USSR" (СССР) on the obverse and the small star with hammer and sickle in its centre, unit's name and a motto on the reverse. The mottoes were different for different regiments (for example, those regiments made Guards in the Great Patriotic War bore the motto 'Death to the German Invaders!'). Naval Guards units had a Guards ribbon included in the Naval ensign whenever a ship becomes a Guards ship.

- Soviet Army colours (In Russian)

== Spain ==
=== Kingdom of Spain ===
An army regulation of July 1810 stated that line infantry regiments of the Spanish army would bear two colours. The first battalion would carry the coronela (King's Colour), which was white and bore the Royal Coat of Arms in the centre, sometimes on top of a burgundy Cross, surrounded by various regimental devices, while the second battalion (and independent battalions of light infantry) would carry the sencilla (Regimental Colour), which would have a burgundy cross with the provincial coat of arms at the four corners, and the name of the regiment in the top half. In 1843, the regulations introduced a new pattern for regimental colours, with the sencilla replaced by the batallona. This was a flag that adopted the national colours of red-yellow-red horizontal stripes, with a simplified royal coat of arms in the centre atop a small burgundy cross and the name of the regiment encircling it.

=== Spain under Franco ===
Following the victory of General Franco in the Spanish Civil War, the Spanish army adopted the policy of using only a single colour, the batallona, with the new coat of arms in its centre replacing the Royal arms, and the name of the regiment encircling it.

== See also ==
- Military colours, standards and guidons
- Regulation Colours
