= AMJ =

AMJ may refer to:

- Ahmadiyya Muslim Jama'at or Ahmadiyya Muslim Community
- Academy of Management Journal, an academic journal
- Ahmad Musa Jibril, a Palestinian-American Muslim preacher
- AMJ Highway, abbreviation of the highway in Malacca, Malaysia
