= 2017 London Bridge attack =

Terror attack in London

Coordinates: 51°30′29″N 0°05′16″W

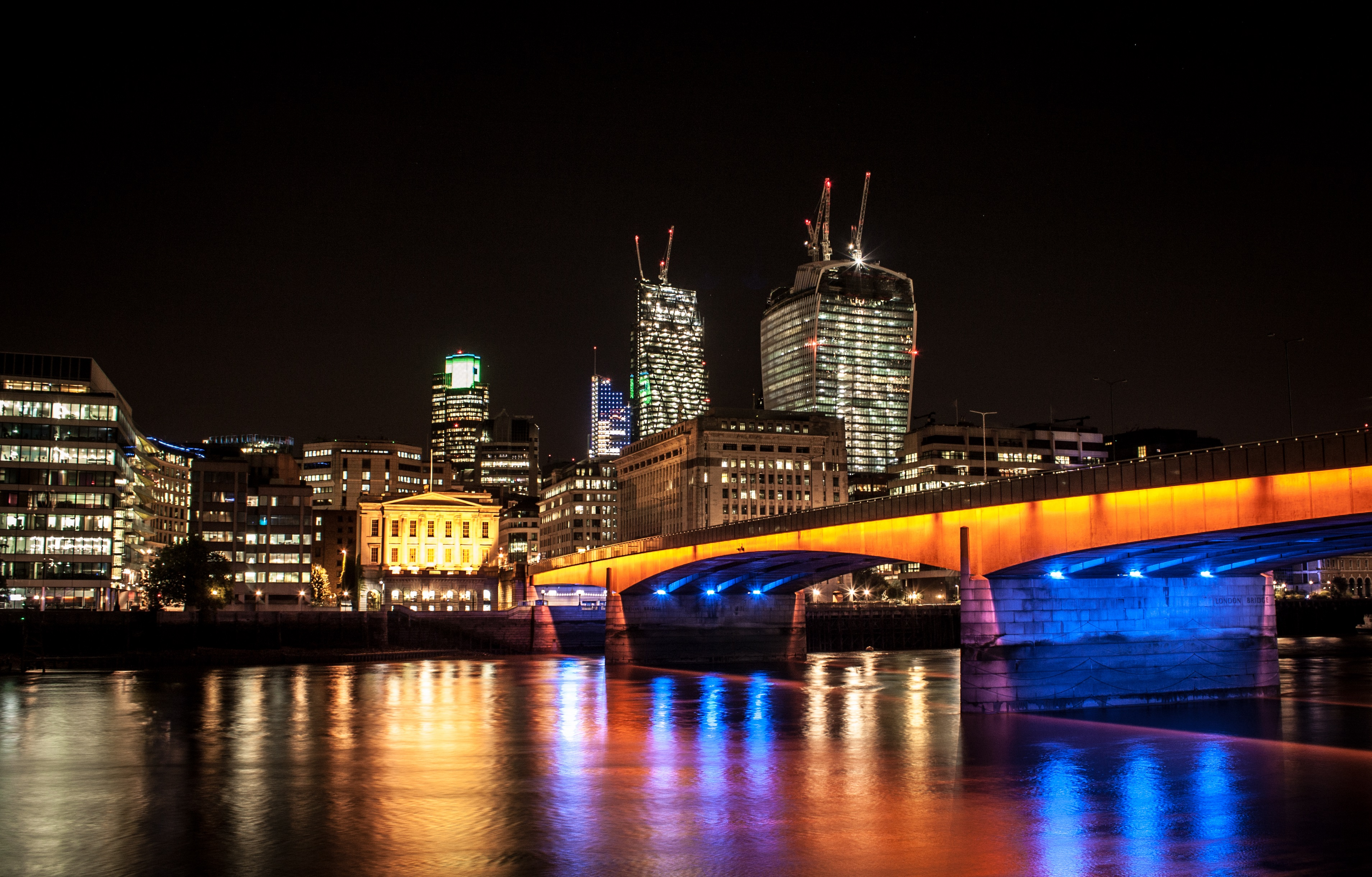
- London Bridge at night in 2013

- 2017 London Bridge attack (City of London) 2017 London Bridge attack (Greater London) 2017 London Bridge attack (the United Kingdom)
- Location: London Bridge and Borough Market area, London, United Kingdom
- Date: 3 June 2017; 9 years ago 22:06–22:16 (BST)
- Attack type: Vehicle-ramming attack, stabbing, Islamic terrorism
- Weapons: Renault Master van, ceramic knives, 13 Molotov cocktails (unused)
- Deaths: 11 (including the 3 perpetrators)
- Injuries: 48 (21 critically)
- Assailants: Khuram Shazad Butt; Rachid Redouane; Youssef Zaghba
- Motive: Islamist extremism

On 3 June 2017, a terrorist vehicle-ramming and stabbing attack took place in London, England. A van was deliberately driven into pedestrians on London Bridge, and then crashed on Borough High Street, just south of the River Thames. The van's three occupants then ran to the nearby Borough Market area and began stabbing people in and around restaurants and pubs. They were shot dead by Metropolitan Police and City of London Police firearms officers, and were found to be wearing fake explosive vests.

Eight people were killed and forty-eight were injured, including members of the public and four unarmed police officers who attempted to stop the assailants. British authorities described the perpetrators as "radical Islamist terrorists". The Islamic State (ISIS) claimed responsibility for the attack.

== Background ==
In March 2017, five people had been killed in a combined vehicle and knife attack at Westminster. In late May, a suicide bomber killed 22 people at an Ariana Grande concert at Manchester Arena. After the Manchester bombing, the UK's terror threat level was raised to "critical", its highest level, until 27 May 2017, when it was lowered to severe.

== Attack ==
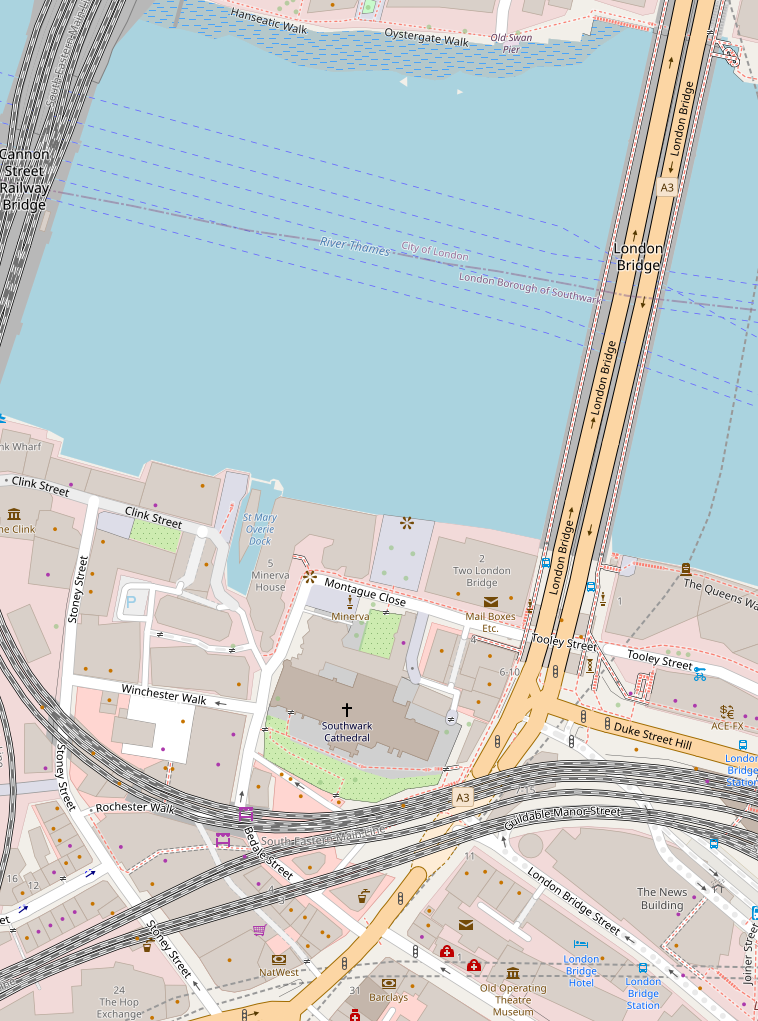
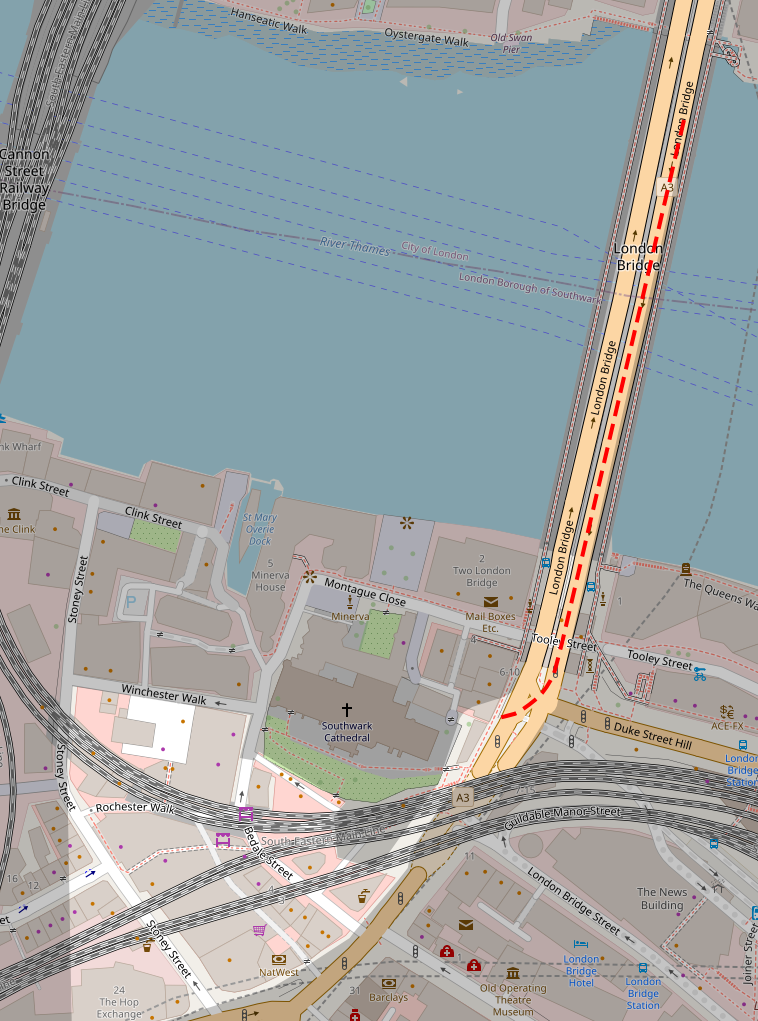
Map showing key locations of the attack with Borough Market and London Bridge highlighted.

The attack was carried out using a white Renault Master hired earlier on the same evening in Harold Hill, Havering, by Khuram Butt. He had intended to hire a 7.5 tonne lorry, but was refused due to his failure to provide payment details. The attackers were armed with 12-inch (30 cm) kitchen knives with ceramic blades, which they tied to their wrists with leather straps. They also prepared fake explosive belts by wrapping water bottles in grey tape.

At 21:58 BST (UTC+1) on 3 June 2017, the van travelled south across London Bridge, and returned six minutes later, crossing over the bridge northbound, making a U-turn at the northern end and then driving southbound across the bridge. It mounted the pavement three times and hit multiple pedestrians, killing two. Witnesses said the van was travelling at high speed. 999 emergency calls were first recorded at 22:07. The van was later found to contain 13 wine bottles containing flammable liquid with rags stuffed in them, along with blow torches.

The van crashed on Borough High Street, after crossing the central reservation. The van's tyres were destroyed by the central reservation and the three attackers, armed with knives, abandoned the vehicle. Then they ran down the steps to Green Dragon Court, where they killed five people outside and near the Boro Bistro pub. After attacking the Boro Bistro pub, the attackers went back up the steps to Borough High Street and attacked three bystanders. Police tried to fight the attackers, but were stabbed, and Ignacio Echeverría helped them by striking Redouane and possibly Zaghba with his skateboard. Echeverría was later killed outside Lobos Meat and Tapas. Members of the public threw bottles and chairs at the attackers. Witnesses reported that the attackers were shouting "This is for Allah".

People in and around other restaurants and bars along Stoney Street were also attacked. During the attack, an unknown man was spared by Rachid Redouane, but despite many efforts the man was never found. A Romanian baker hit one of the attackers over the head with a crate before giving shelter to 20 people inside a bakery inside Borough Market.

One man, Roy Larner, fought the three attackers with his fists in the Black and Blue steakhouse, shouting "Fuck you, I'm Millwall", giving members of the public who were in the restaurant the opportunity to run away. He was stabbed eight times in the hands, chest and head. He underwent surgery at St Thomas' Hospital and was taken off the critical list on 4 June. A British Transport Police officer armed with a baton also took on the attackers, receiving multiple stab wounds and temporarily losing sight in his right eye as a consequence. Off-duty Metropolitan police constables Liam Jones and Stewart Henderson rendered first aid to seriously injured members of the public before protecting 150+ people inside the Thameside Inn and evacuating them by Metropolitan marine support unit and RNLI boats to the north shore of the Thames.

The three attackers were shot dead by armed officers from the City of London and Metropolitan police Specialist Firearms Command eight minutes after the initial emergency call was made. CCTV footage showed the three attackers in Borough Market running at the armed officers; the attackers were shot dead 20 seconds later. A total of 46 rounds were fired by three City of London and five Metropolitan Police officers.

=== Aftermath ===
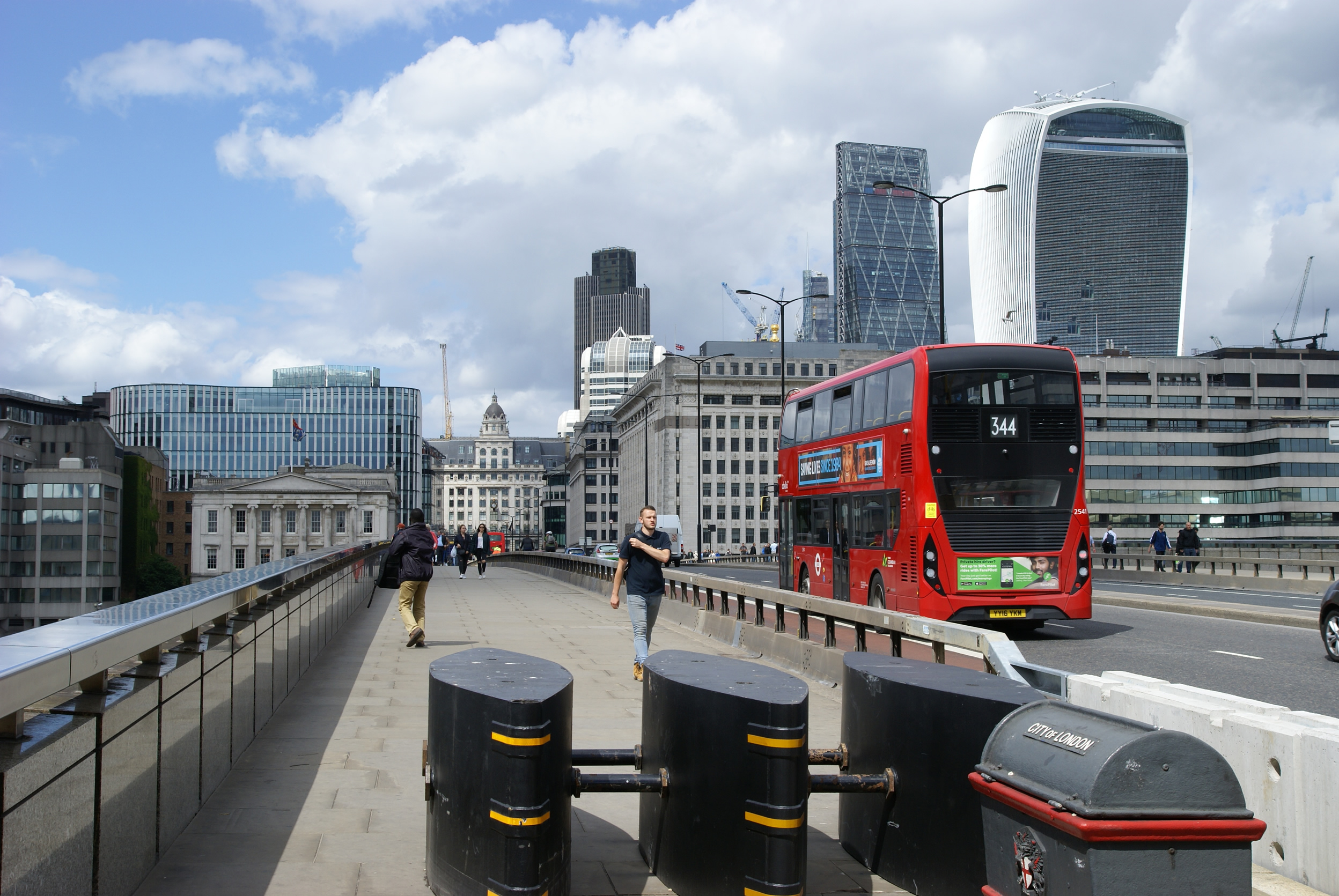
Bollards installed on London Bridge to prevent future attacks

The Metropolitan Police issued 'Run, Hide, Tell' notices via social media during the attack, and asked for the public to remain calm and vigilant.

All buildings within the vicinity of London Bridge were evacuated, and London Bridge, Borough and Bank Underground stations were closed at the request of the police. The mainline railway stations at London Bridge, Waterloo East, Charing Cross and Cannon Street were also closed. The Home Secretary approved the deployment of a military counter terrorist unit from the Special Air Service (SAS). The helicopters carrying the SAS landed on London Bridge to support the Metropolitan Police because of concerns that there might be more attackers at large.

The Metropolitan Police Marine Policing Unit dispatched boats on the River Thames, with assistance from the Royal National Lifeboat Institution (RNLI), to contribute to the evacuation of the area and look for any casualties who might have fallen from the bridge.

A stabbing incident took place in Vauxhall at 23:45, causing Vauxhall station to be briefly closed; this was later confirmed to be unrelated to the attack.

At 01:45 on 4 June, controlled explosions took place of the attackers' bomb vests, which were found to be fake.

An emergency COBR meeting was held on the morning of 4 June. London Bridge mainline railway and Underground stations remained closed throughout 4 June, while Borough tube station reopened that evening. A cordon was established around the scene of the attack. London Bridge station reopened at 05:00 on Monday 5 June.

Mayor of London Sadiq Khan said that there was a surge of hate crimes and islamophobic incidents following the attack.

New security measures were implemented on eight central London bridges following the attack, to reduce the likelihood of further vehicle attacks, with concrete barriers installed. The barriers have been criticised for causing severe congestion in cycle lanes during peak hours.

Borough Market reopened on 14 June.

== Casualties ==
Victims by location and name
Location	Name(s)
Run over on London Bridge	Xavier Thomas, Christine Archibald
By/near stairs on London Bridge	Sara Zelenak, James McMullan
In/around bistro	Alexandre Pigeard, Sébastien Bélanger, Kirsty Boden
Borough High Street	Ignacio Echeverría

Victims by nationality
Country	Number
France	3
Australia	2
Canada	1
Spain	1
United Kingdom	1
Total	8

Eight civilians died: one Spaniard, one Briton, two Australians, one Canadian and three French citizens were killed by the attackers, and the three attackers themselves were killed by armed police. Forty-eight people were injured in the attack, including one New Zealander, two Australians, two Germans and four French citizens; of the 48 people admitted to hospital, 21 were initially reported to be in a critical condition. One body was recovered from the Thames near Limehouse several days after the attack. Two of the fatalities were caused in the initial vehicle-ramming attack, while the remaining six were stabbed to death.

Four police officers were among those injured in the attack. A British Transport Police officer was stabbed and suffered serious injuries to his head, face and neck. An off-duty Metropolitan Police officer was seriously injured when he was stabbed. Two other Metropolitan Police officers received head and arm injuries. As a result of the police gunfire, a bystander received an accidental gunshot wound, which was "not critical".

== Attackers ==
On 4 June the Home Secretary, Amber Rudd, said that "We are confident about the fact that they were radical Islamic terrorists, the way they were inspired, and we need to find out more about where this radicalisation came from." Amaq News Agency, an online outlet associated with the Islamic State of Iraq and Syria (ISIS), said the attackers were ISIS fighters. On 5 June, two of the attackers were identified as Khuram Shazad Butt and Rachid Redouane. The third of the three attackers, Youssef Zaghba, was identified the following day.

=== Khuram Shazad Butt ===
Butt (born 20 April 1990) was a Pakistan-born British citizen whose family came from Jhelum. He grew up in Britain, living in Plaistow. He had a wife and two children. Neighbours told the BBC that Butt had been reported to police for attempting to radicalise children; he had also expressed disgust at the way women dressed. He was known to police as a "heavyweight" member of the banned extremist group Al-Muhajiroun. A BBC interviewee said he had a verbal confrontation with Butt in 2013 on the day after another Al-Muhajiroun follower had murdered Fusilier Lee Rigby.

Butt was part of an al-Muhajiroun campaign in 2015 to intimidate Muslims who planned to vote in the UK general elections of that year, on the basis that it was forbidden in Islam. He was known for holding extreme views, having been barred from two local mosques. He appeared in a 2016 Channel 4 Television documentary, The Jihadis Next Door, which showed him arguing with police over the unfurling of an ISIL black flag in Regent's Park. According to a friend, he had been radicalised by the YouTube videos of the American Muslim hate preacher Ahmad Musa Jibril. Butt was known to have taken drugs before he became radicalised. After radicalisation, Butt started to stop his neighbours on the street and ask them whether they had been to the mosque.

Butt had worked for a man accused of training Mohammad Sidique Khan, the leader of the July 2005 London bombing. The police and MI5 knew of Butt and he was investigated in 2015. The investigation was later "moved into the lower echelons", and his file was classed as low priority.

Butt sometimes manned the desk of the Ummah Fitness Centre gym, where he prayed regularly. CCTV footage has been released of Butt, Redouane and Zaghba meeting outside the gym days before the attack. A senior figure at a local mosque had reported the gym to police.

The New York Times said that Butt and his brother were part of the UK government's Prevent programme, which aims to stop people from becoming terrorists, and which reports suspected radicals to police programmes. At the time of the attack he was on police bail following an allegation of fraud, though the police had intended to take no further action due to a lack of evidence. He had previously been cautioned by police for fraud in 2008 and common assault in 2010.

=== Rachid Redouane ===
Redouane (born 31 July 1986) was a failed asylum seeker in the UK, whose application was denied in 2009, and not previously known to police. He had claimed to be either Moroccan or Libyan.

Redouane worked as a pastry chef and in 2012 he married an Irish woman in a ceremony in Ireland. He beat and bullied his wife. She eventually divorced him after he tried to force his extremist beliefs on her. He used to drink alcohol. He lived variously in Rathmines, a suburb of Dublin, also in Morocco and the UK. According to his wife, Redouane was most likely radicalised in Morocco. Later the couple stayed in the UK on an EU residency card where they had a daughter in 2015. The couple separated in 2016. At the time of the attack, he was living in Dagenham, East London.

=== Youssef Zaghba ===
Zaghba (born 1995 in Fez, Morocco) was at the time of the attack living in east London where he worked in a fast-food outlet. He also worked at an Islamic television channel in London. Zaghba was born to a Moroccan Muslim father and an Italian Catholic Christian mother who had converted to Islam when she married. Zaghba had dual Moroccan and Italian nationality. When his parents divorced, he went to Italy with his mother. In 2016, Zaghba was stopped at Bologna Guglielmo Marconi Airport by Italian officers who found ISIS-related materials on his mobile phone; he was stopped from continuing his journey to Istanbul. According to The Times, Italian authorities had failed to notify British authorities directly and had entered incomplete and incorrect information onto the Schengen Information System, allowing Zaghba to enter the UK without being identified as a terrorist threat. Italian authorities said Zaghba was monitored continuously while in Italy and that the UK was informed about him. Giuseppe Amato, an Italian prosecutor, said: "We did our best. We could just monitor and surveil ... [Zaghba] and send a note to British authorities, that's all we could do and we did it. Since he moved to London, he came back to Italy once in a while for a total of 10 days. And during those 10 days we never let him out of our sight."

According to The New York Times, the Italian branch of Al-Muhajiroun had introduced Butt to Zaghba.

== Investigation ==
On the morning of 4 June, police made 12 arrests following raids in flats in the Barking area of east London, where one of the attackers lived; controlled explosions were carried out during the raids. Those held included five males aged between 27 and 55, arrested at one address in Barking, and six females aged between 19 and 60, arrested at a separate Barking address. One of the arrested males was subsequently released without charge. Four properties were being searched, including two in Newham in addition to the two in Barking. Further raids and arrests were made at properties in Newham and Barking early on the morning of 5 June. On 6 June, a man was arrested in Barking, and another in Ilford the following day. By 16 June, all those arrested had been released without charge.

== Inquest ==
On 7 May 2019, an inquest into the deaths of the victims opened at the Old Bailey in London with Judge Mark Lucraft QC, Chief Coroner of England and Wales presiding. Relatives of the victims paid tribute to the deceased. The inquest concluded that the victims were unlawfully killed.

A separate inquest was held to investigate the lawfulness of the deadly force used against the attackers also presided over by Judge Mark Lucraft QC. The inquest concluded the attackers were lawfully killed.

== Reactions ==
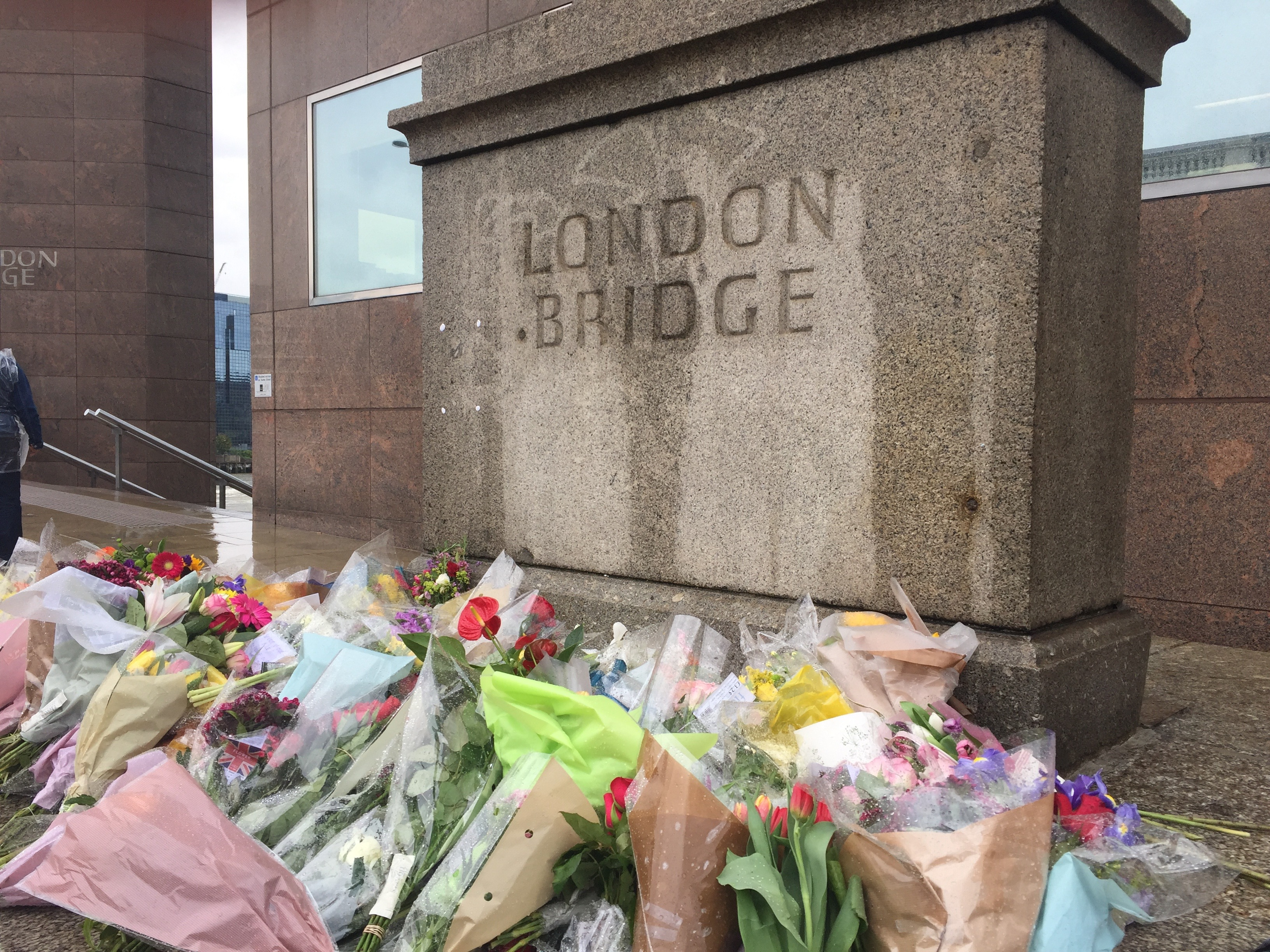
Floral tributes left on London Bridge following the attack

The Prime Minister, Theresa May, returned to Downing Street from campaigning for the forthcoming snap general election. May, on the morning after the attack, said the incident was being treated as terrorism, and that the recent terror attacks in the UK are "bound together by the single evil ideology of Islamist extremism" which "is a perversion of Islam". As part of a four-point plan to tackle terrorism, she called for tighter internet regulations to "deprive the extremists of their safe spaces online", saying that technology firms were not currently doing enough. May's stance on the role of the internet and social media in enabling radicalisation was criticised by the Open Rights Group and the International Centre for the Study of Radicalisation and Political Violence. May was also criticised for using the speech to detail policy measures to respond to the terror threat, which some saw as contrary to her pledge to pause campaigning out of respect for the victims. May said a review would be carried out by the police and intelligence agencies to establish whether the attack could have been prevented, and on 28 June Home Secretary Amber Rudd commissioned David Anderson QC to provide independent assurance of the review work.

The Leader of the Opposition Jeremy Corbyn, the Liberal Democrat leader Tim Farron and the Mayor of London Sadiq Khan all wrote on Twitter that their thoughts were with those affected and expressed thanks to the emergency services. Khan described the attack as "deliberate and cowardly" and condemned it "in the strongest possible terms". He later said that "the city remains one of the safest in the world" and there was "no reason to be alarmed" over the increased police presence around the city.

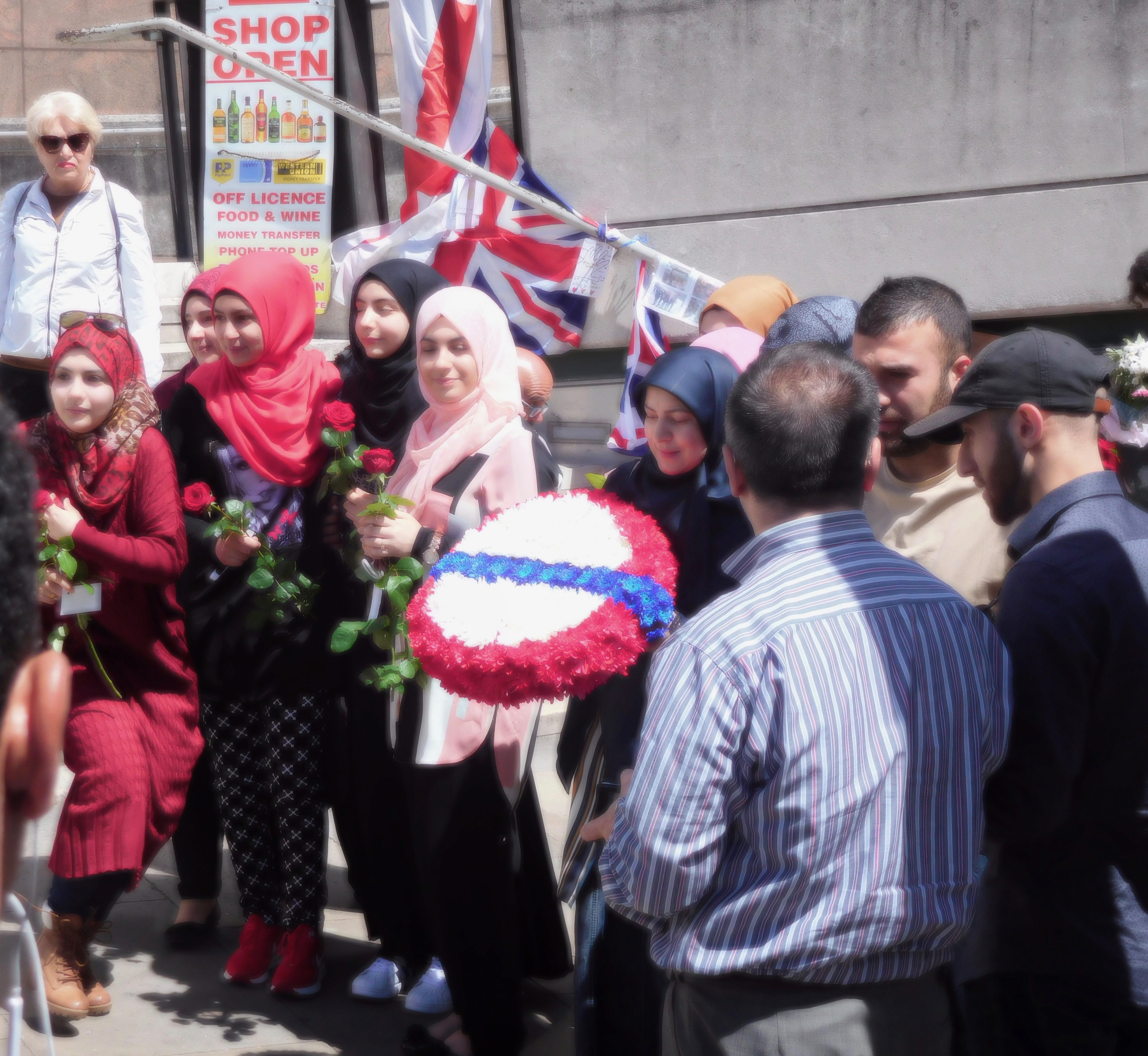
Muslim families at London Bridge days after the 2017 attack.

The Conservative Party, Labour Party, Liberal Democrats and Scottish National Party suspended national election campaigning for a day after the attack. The UK Independence Party chose not to suspend its campaigning; leader Paul Nuttall said it was "what the extremists would want". May confirmed that the general election would go ahead as scheduled on 8 June. The BBC cancelled or postponed a number of political programmes due to air on 4 June. Harun Khan, the secretary general of the Muslim Council of Britain also condemned the attack. More than 130 imams condemned the attackers, refused them Islamic burials, and said in a statement that the terrorists did not represent Islam.

Condolences, expressions of shock, support, solidarity and sympathy were offered by many national governments and supranational bodies. (Note: These included the governments and heads of state of: Argentina, Australia, Bahrain, Canada, China, the Czech Republic, the European Commission, Finland, France, Germany, Hungary, India, Indonesia, Iran, Ireland, Israel, Italy, Japan, Jordan, Kuwait, Malaysia, New Zealand, Oman, the Philippines, Qatar, Romania, Russia, Saudi Arabia, Singapore, South Korea, Spain, Taiwan, Turkey, the United Arab Emirates, the United States, the Vatican and Vietnam.)

Three George Medals were awarded in relation to the attacks: Ignacio Echeverría (posthumous), a civilian; and two police officers, PC Charlie Guenigault of the Metropolitan Police and PC Wayne Marques of the British Transport Police. All three were seriously injured as they directly confronted the terrorists and attempted to save others. PCs Liam Jones and Stewart Henderson, both of the Metropolitan Police, received the British Empire Medal. PC Leon McLeod of the British Transport Police received a Queen's Gallantry Medal, and PCs Tim Andrews, Sam Balfour, Lian Rae, and Bartosz Tchorzewski received the Queen's Police Medal for Distinguished Service. Four civilians were awarded the Queen's Commendation for Bravery: Kirsty Boden (posthumous); Ellen Gauntlett; Justin Jones; and Florin Morariu. Joy Ongcachuy, Acting Detective Zac Idun, London Ambulance Service operations director Paul Woodrow, NHS England administrator Peter Boorman, Malik Ramadhan and Claire Summers were awarded OBEs for, variously, responding to the attacks, treating victims and liaising with their families, and conducting related investigations.

After the attack, the Australian and Saudi Arabian men's football teams had a World Cup qualifier match in Adelaide. Just before the match, the Australian team observed a one-minute silence; however, the Saudi team did not observe it.

== See also ==
- 2017 in the United Kingdom
- List of terrorist incidents in London
- List of terrorist incidents in Great Britain
- List of terrorist incidents in 2017
- 2017 Finsbury Park attack
