= Ignacio Echeverría =

Spaniard murdered in the June 2017 London Bridge terrorist attack

Don Servant of God Ignacio Echeverría OMC, GM
- Born: Ignacio Echeverría Miralles de Imperial; 25 May 1978; Ferrol, Galicia, Spain
- Died: 3 June 2017 (aged 39); London, England, U.K.
- Education: Complutense University
- Occupations: Banker; Lawyer
- Awards: Grand Cross of the Order of Civil Merit (Spain) Grand Cross of the Order for Civil Recognition of the Victims of Terrorism (Spain); Order of Police Merit (Spain); Gold Medal of the Community of Madrid (Spain) George Medal (UK)

Don Ignacio Echeverría Miralles de Imperial, OMC, GM (25 May 1978 – 3 June 2017) was a Spanish lawyer and banker. He fought off two of the three terrorists in the 2017 London Bridge attack, before being killed by the terrorists.

== Biography ==
Ignacio Echeverría, called Abo, was the third of five children. He was the son of Joaquín Echeverría Alonso, an Asturian engineer, and Ana Miralles de Imperial Hornedo, a lawyer. Even though he was born in the Hospital General of Ferrol, La Coruña (Spain), he was entered in the Civil Register of As Pontes de García Rodríguez, a town situated in the northwest of the province. He lived there until the age of 9, when the family moved to Las Rozas de Madrid. Echeverría grew up in a Catholic home, and was a member of a local group of Catholic Action in Las Rozas. Apart from his native Spanish, he was fluent in English, French and German, and graduated in law from two universities, the Complutense University and the Sorbonne. He was also fond of skateboarding, surfing, golf and squash.

After working in several banks and being unemployed, he decided to move to London, where he secured a position as a money laundering prevention analyst with HSBC.

== Attack and burial ==
At around 10pm on Saturday 3 June 2017, Echeverría, carrying his skateboard on his back, was skateboarding with friends in London. Near Borough Market, they saw a man attacking a police officer lying on the ground. When the man left the body of the officer and began to assault a woman (a French citizen who survived the incident due to Echeverría's actions) Echeverría used his skateboard to strike the attacker, diverting his attention long enough for several people to move to safety. He subsequently attacked a second terrorist who was also attacking a police officer. He was then stabbed twice in the back by two attackers, causing his death.

After the attack, several of his relatives left messages on social networks asking for help to locate his body. His sister and niece toured London hospitals looking for him without success. The Spanish Consulate and the Spanish Embassy provided help and support to his sister and family during the search process. The Minister of Foreign Affairs of Spain, Alfonso Dastis, expressed his bewilderment at the disappearance of Echeverría. His father reported that HSBC employed a former police private investigator to help find him.

On Wednesday 7 June, British authorities confirmed to his family that Echeverría had been among the eight victims of the attack. The family identified him the next day and began the process of repatriation. On 10 June his body was transferred to Spain by military airplane and was received with honours by Prime Minister Mariano Rajoy and María Dolores de Cospedal, Minister of Defence, at Torrejón Air Base (Madrid). The body lay in repose in the cemetery of Las Rozas de Madrid, with the Order of Civil Merit Grand Cross which he had been posthumously awarded placed on the coffin. On Sunday 11 June, a funeral mass was held in Corpus Christi Parish of Las Rozas conducted by Archbishop of Madrid Carlos Osoro Sierra, who had previously officiated a mass to mark the coffin's arrival in Spain.

== Reactions ==
The Town Council of Las Rozas de Madrid, where the Echeverría family lived, declared a two-day official mourning period and a rally in memory of Echeverría which was attended by more than 1,000 people, as well as naming the skate park where Echeverría used to practise after him. The Town Council of As Pontes de García Rodríguez convened a demonstration of mourning. The news of his death and the circumstances surrounding it saw significant coverage in both national and international press, with media dubbing him the Skateboard Hero.

The Bar Association of Madrid expressed dismay for the murder of a former member and announcing its intention to participate in all tributes in his memory. Spanish singer Joaquín Sabina dedicated a song to him in a concert that was held after the attack in Úbeda (province of Jaén) as well as mentioning him at a concert in London. The Spanish Skating Federation awarded him its order of merit and medal. Senior members of the Catholic Church in Spain also praised his example and asked for members to pray for him, including Cardinal-Archbishop of Madrid, who conducted his funeral, and Luis Ángel de las Heras CMF, the Bishop of Ferrol, his hometown.

Posthumous armorial achievement of Don Ignacio Echeverría embellished with his Grand Cross of the Order of Civil Merit (Spain), Silver Medal of the Order of Police Merit (Spain) and George Medal (United Kingdom)

On 14 June, the Workers' Commissions Trade Union representatives in Endesa issued a statement lamenting the murder of Echeverría and expressing their solidarity with his father, a retired worker of the company. The City Council of Alicante agreed to give his name to the San Juan Beach skate park. Spanish boxer Kerman Lejarraga dedicated his victory in New York to Ignacio Echeverría. He said "this victory is especially dedicated to Ignacio Echeverría, who died a hero".

During the Spanish state visit to the United Kingdom in July 2017, Felipe VI mentioned his act of heroism at the reception in the Spanish Embassy as well as in his speeches to both houses of Parliament and at the state banquet in the presence of Queen Elizabeth II. A tribute was held in Comillas (Cantabria), where Echeverría spent the summer with his family, on 10 August 2017. Dozens of people attended and a sports area with a skate park was dedicated to him. During the military parade of the national day of Spain on 12 October 2017, devoted for the first time to victims of terrorism, Echeverría received a tribute along with the victims of the Barcelona attacks. His mother accompanied King Felipe during the floral offering with the ambassadors of the countries that had suffered casualties in these attacks and presidents of the Association of Victims of Terrorism and the Foundation of Victims of Terrorism.

On 11 October 2018, Echeverría's parents, alongside Constable Charles Guenigault and Constable Wayne Marques, received the George Medal from the Queen at Buckingham Palace. Constable Leon McLeod was awarded the Queen's Gallantry Medal at the same investiture ceremony. These four appointments were approved on 19 July 2018 for "confronting armed terrorists to protect others at London Bridge".

== Beatification ==
Ignacio Echeverría

Servant of God
- Born: 25 May 1978; Ferrol, Galicia, Spain
- Died: 3 June 2017 (aged 39); London, England, U.K.
- Cause of death: 2017 London Bridge attack

Five years after Echeverría's death at the London Bridge attack, the Roman Catholic Archdiocese of Madrid has joined forces with his family in an effort to have him recognised as a saint. Preliminary steps for his beatification are underway led by the Auxiliary Bishop Juan Antonio Martínez Camino.

== Honours ==
=== Spanish orders and medals ===
- Grand Cross of the Order of Civil Merit (10 June 2017)
- Grand Cross of the Royal Order for Civil Recognition of the Victims of Terrorism (18 May 2018)
- Silver Medal of the Order of Police Merit (17 July 2017)
- Gold Medal of the Community of Madrid (2 May 2019)
- Medal of Honour of Las Rozas de Madrid, 1st recipient (29 September 2017)

=== Foreign ===
- United Kingdom:
  - Posthumous George Medal (19 July 2018), which was presented personally by Elizabeth II to Echeverría's parents in a ceremony at Buckingham Palace.
  - High Commendation of the Metropolitan Police Service, the British Transport Police and the City of London Police, Tri-Force Commendation 1st recipient (4 December 2017)

=== Other distinctions ===
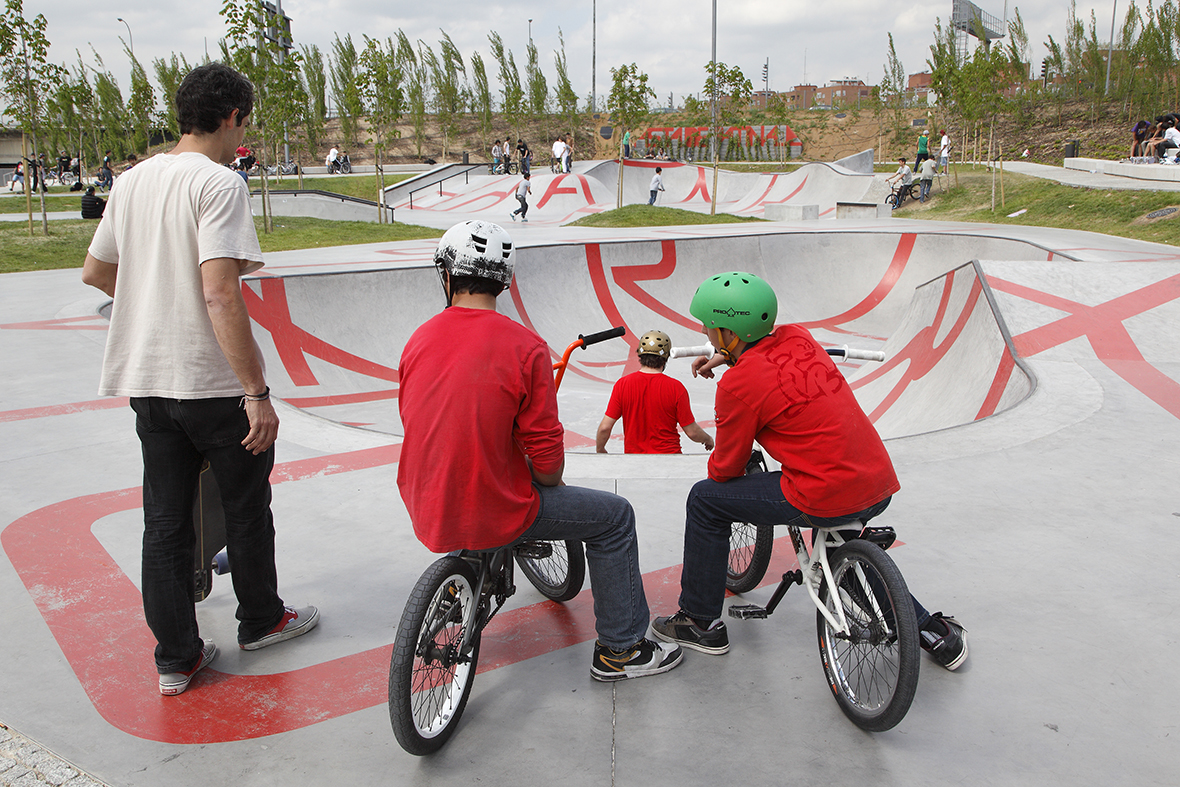
Skatepark in Madrid Río, named after Echeverría in 2017

- The Order of Merit and Medal, Spanish Royal Federation of Skating (9 June 2017)
- Gold Medal of Dignity and Justice Association, Madrid (21 June 2017)
- Gold Medal of Honour of the Chamber of Commerce of Madrid (19 July 2017)
- The Collective of Victims of Terrorism – COVITE International Award, San Sebastián (28 October 2017)
- The IMF International Business School Award for a Better World, Madrid (2 June 2018)
- The Police Public Bravery Awards, United Kingdom (30 October 2018)
- Honorific eponyms:
  - The secondary school in las Rozas where he studied has been renamed in his tribute (27 June 2017)
  - Ignacio Echeverría Sports Area in Comillas, Cantabria (10 August 2017)
  - Ignacio Echeverría Park in As Pontes de García Rodríguez, La Coruña (4 November 2017)
  - Ignacio Echeverría Skateparks in Albal (Valencia), Alcorcón (Madrid), Alicante, Alpedrete (Madrid), Boadilla del Monte (Madrid), Fuengirola (Málaga), Fuenlabrada (Madrid), Logroño, Navalcarnero (Madrid) projected, Torre del Mar and Las Rozas de Madrid projected.
