= Order of Merit of the Civil Guard =

Spanish civil order

Order of Merit of the Civil Guard Orden del Mérito de la Guardia Civil
- Emblem of the Order

Awarded by the King of Spain
- Type: Order of merit
- Established: 29 May 1976; 50 years ago
- Royal house: House of Bourbon-Anjou
- Eligibility: Spanish and foreign citizens
- Awarded for: extraordinary actions in favour of the Civil Guard and the Nation
- Status: Extant
- Sovereign: King Felipe VI
- Grand Chancellor: Fernando Grande-Marlaska, Minister of the Interior
- Chancellor: The Director-General of the Civil Guard
- Grades: Grand Cross; Gold Cross; Silver Cross; Cross
- Post-nominals: OMGC

Precedence
- Next (higher): Order of Merit for Security
- Next (lower): Civil Order of Environmental Merit
- Equivalent: Order of Police Merit
- Grand Cross ribbon

The Order of Merit of the Civil Guard (Spanish: Orden del Mérito de la Guardia Civil) is a Spanish order of merit whose purpose is "to reward actions or conduct of extraordinary importance, which enhance the prestige of the Civil Guard and the interests of the Homeland". The decoration, which is of a civil nature, may be awarded to members of said law enforcement agency and to any other person or entity that is deserving of it.

The order was established by Law 19/1976, of May 29, and it was originally named "Order of Merit of the Civil Guard Corps". The 2012 Budget Act renamed the order and created a fifth category, the Grand Cross. Our Lady of the Pillar, patroness saint of the Civil Guard, was the first recipient of the grand cross.

== Grades ==
According to Order 2008/2012, of September 21, the Order of Merit has five classes:

- Grand Cross. It is the highest class and it was established in 2012. It is to reward "general officers, civilian personnel, units, entities and patronages, taking into account the institutional, administrative, academic or professional rank of the person, unit or entity being rewarded, in consideration of the outstanding merits and circumstances that exist in them related to the Civil Guard Corps or public safety".
- Gold Cross. Its purpose its to reward those killed or severely wounded in action, or for those who acted bravely in action even at the risk of their own lives.
- Silver Cross. It rewards those who, without meeting the personal risk condition required for the Gold Cross, performed actions of relevant merit.
- Cross, with Red Decoration. It honors those who, risking their lives, "demonstrate courage and carry out actions that clearly demonstrate extraordinary personal valor, initiative, and composure in the face of danger". It also rewards those killed or severely wounded in action.
- Cross, with White Decoration. It honors those who perform extraordinary actions in general, those "who maintain exemplary conduct", and those "who carry out professional or scientific studies, or other outstanding deeds or work, that bring notable prestige to the Civil Guard, or are of officially recognized usefulness to the service".

The Grand Cross is the only class awarded by a Royal Decree signed by the Monarch, on the advice of the interior minister and after hearing the Council of Ministers. The remaining classes are awarded by order of the minister of the interior. In all cases, when the recipient is a member of the Civil Guard, the approval of the minister of defense is required.

In addition, the Golden Cross and the Cross with Red Decoration are pensioned crosses, meaning that they come with a lifetime pension. In the first case, it represents an additional 20% to the salary established annually in the General State Budget for the recipient's professional category. In the case of the Cross with Red Decoration, it is 15%. If the recipient does not receive a public salary, they may be given a lifetime pension based on the salary of a First Sergeant of the Civil Guard (OR-7).

Insignias
Grand Cross	Gold Cross	Silver Cross	Cross; Red Decoration	Cross; White Decoration

== See also ==
- Orders, decorations, and medals of Spain
