= Order of Police Merit =

Spanish law enforcement order

Orden del Mérito Policial
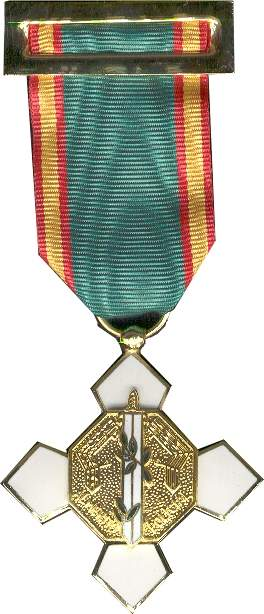
- Order of Police Merit. Cross with white badge

Awarded by the Ministry of the Interior
- Type: National order
- Eligibility: Members of Spanish police services and civils.
- Awarded for: Demonstration of the highest qualities of service to Spain, the police community, and humanity at large.
- Status: Currently constituted

Precedence
- Next (higher): Order of Merit for Security
- Next (lower): Police Service Decoration
- Equivalent: Order of Merit of the Civil Guard

The Order of Police Merit is a Spanish distinction created, initially only as a medal, in 1943 to offer a special reward to members of the police. Currently it is awarded in four categories: Gold Medal, Silver Medal, Cross with red badge and Cross with white badge. All of them, except the Cross with white badge, have pensions attached to the salary of the police.

== Creation, design and categories ==
This order was created by decree of June 18, 1943, with the aim of providing a way to reward the police for their outstanding actions, both in the form of "extraordinary services practised" and in the "work or studies of outstanding scientific interest or professional technique".

The creation of the medal was raised to the rank of law on May 15, 1945, and extended the corresponding pension to immediate family members in case the decorated was for death in the act of service.

Initially, the medal was awarded in three categories: gold, silver and bronze, but Law 5/1964, of April 29, in addition to specifying the causes that could lead to the award of the first two categories, eliminated the last one. In its place the categories of Cross with red badge and Cross with white badge were created.

=== Medals ===
The design of the medals was established in 1945, based on two of the works submitted to the public tender called. The adopted model was a 40 mm circle with an obverse showing the "sacrifice for the service under guardianship of the Guardian Angel" with the inscription "To the police merit". On the back a sword representing Justice with the slogan "Service-Sacrifice". The medal hangs on a green ribbon with the colors of the Spanish flag on the edges. The ribbon carries a pin with the corresponding metal (gold or silver) in which it is inscribed the year of the concession. In the version that was accompanied by a pension on the ribbon, a longitudinal white stripe appeared.

=== Crosses ===
The 1964 law that created the Cross also specified its design, which has "a total length of 4.5 cm and is a regular octagon of 8 mm on the side." In the center, on gold enamel, a sword enamelled in white and decorated. The arms, on the inner surface, will be enamelled in red or white depending on the class, and in the center, from left to right, it will read: "To Police Merit".

== Reasons for the award ==
Posthumous armorial achievement of Ignacio Echeverría embellished with his Grand Cross of the Order of Civil Merit (Spain), Silver Medal of the Order of Police Merit (Spain) and George Medal (United Kingdom)

In this law of 1964 the reasons for the granting of the different categories were also specified:

- Gold or silver medal:
  - death, mutilation or serious injuries with permanent consequences, in the act of service or because of him (except accident, incompetence or imprudence)
  - direct or perform a service of transcendental importance with prestige for the Body and with manifestation of exceptional qualities
  - Exemplary and extraordinary performance, with outstanding value, capacity or efficiency reiterated in the fulfilment of important services with prestige for the Body
  - in general, analogous facts that even without adjusting completely to the previous exigencies, they deserve it by extraordinary merits
- Cross with red badge:
  - injured in the act of service or because of him (except accident, incompetence or imprudence)
  - three or more services in which aggression with weapons, even without being injured
  - self-denying or showing high value, in circumstances of danger to his person, with utility for service or prestige for the Corps
  - conduct that deserves special reward for distinguished and extraordinary events with a clear risk or personal danger
- Cross with white badge:
  - fact that evidences high patriotism or loyalty, with prestige for the Body or utility for service
  - excel in the fulfilment of duty or perform outstanding works or scientific studies with utility for service or prestige for the Corps
  - in general, acts analogous to those described with prestige for the Corps or utility for service
