= Forms of address in Spain =

This article includes the list of forms of address used in Spain.

== Abbreviations ==
- His/Her Majesty (Su Majestad): HM (SM)
- His/Her Royal Highness (Su Alteza Real): HRH (SAR)
- The Most Excellent (Excelentísimo Señor / Excelentísima Señora): The Most Ext (Excmo. Sr. / Excma. Sra.)
- The Most Illustrious (Ilustrísimo Señor / Ilustrísima Señora): The Most Ill (Ilmo. Sr. / Ilma. Sra.)
- The Most Reverend (Reverendísimo Señor): The Most Rev (Rev. Sr.)
- Lord (Don): Lord (D.)

== Royalty ==
Position	On envelopes	Salutation in letter	Oral address
King	HM The King (SM El Rey)	Your Majesty (Majestad)	Your Majesty, and thereafter as Sir (Señor)
Queen	HM The Queen (SM La Reina)	Your Majesty (Majestad)	Your Majesty, and thereafter as Ma'am (Señora)
Prince of Asturias	HRH The Prince of Asturias (SAR El Príncipe de Asturias)	Your Royal Highness (Alteza Real)	Your Royal Highness, and thereafter as Sir (Señor)
Princess of Asturias	HRH The Princess of Asturias (SAR La Princesa de Asturias)	Your Royal Highness (Alteza Real)	Your Royal Highness, and thereafter as Ma'am (Señora)
Infante	HRH The Infante X (SAR El Infante X) e.g., HRH The Infante Alfonso	Your Royal Highness (Alteza Real)	Your Royal Highness, and thereafter as Sir (Señor)
Titled Infante	HRH The Infante X, Duke of Z (SAR El Infante X, Duque de Z) e.g., HRH The Infante Carlos, Duke of Calabria	Your Royal Highness (Alteza Real)	Your Royal Highness, and thereafter as Sir (Señor)
Wife of an Infante (if a Princess by birth)	HRH The Infanta Y (SAR La Infanta Y) e.g., HRH The Infanta Luisa	Your Royal Highness (Alteza Real)	Your Royal Highness, and thereafter as Ma'am (Señora)
Wife of an Infante (if not a Princess by birth)	The Most Ext Doña Y (Excma. Sra. Doña Y) e.g., The Most Ext Doña Marisol de Messía	Excelentísima Señora	Ma'am (Señora)
Wife of a titled Infante (if a Princess by birth)	HRH The Infanta Y, Duchess of Z (SAR La Infanta Y, Duquesa de Z) e.g., HRH The Infanta Ana, Duchess of Calabria	Your Royal Highness (Alteza Real)	Your Royal Highness, and thereafter as Ma'am (Señora)
Wife of a titled Infante (if not a Princess by birth)	The Most Ext The Duchess of Z (Excma. Sra. Duquesa de Z) e.g., The Most Ext The Countess of Covadonga	Excelentisima Señora	Duchess/Marquise/Countess or Doña Name
Infanta	HRH The Infanta Y (SAR La Infante Y) e.g., HRH The Infanta Beatriz	Your Royal Highness (Alteza Real)	Your Royal Highness, and thereafter as Ma'am (Señora)
Titled Infanta	HRH The Infanta Y, Duchess of Z (SAR La Infanta Y, Duquesa de Z) e.g., HRH The Infanta Elena, Duchess of Lugo	Your Royal Highness (Alteza Real)	Your Royal Highness, and thereafter as Ma'am (Señora)
Husband of an Infanta	Mr. X (Sr. Don X) e.g., Mr. José Güell	Dear Mr. X (Querido Don X)	Don X
Husband of a titled Infanta	The Most Ext The Duke of Z (Excmo. Sr. Duque de Z) e.g., The Most Ext The Duke of Palma de Mallorca	Excelentísimo Señor	Duke/Marquis/Count or Don Name
Infante's or Infanta's son	The Most Ext Don X (Excmo. Sr. Don X) e.g., The Most Ext Don Juan Valentín Urdangarín	Excelentísimo Señor	Don Name
Infante's or Infanta's daughter	The Most Ext Doña Y (Excma. Sra. Doña Y) e.g., The Most Ext Doña Victoria de Marichalar	Excelentísima Señora	Doña Name

== Nobility ==
Position	On envelopes	Salutation in letter	Oral address
Duke	The Most Ext The Duke of Z (Excmo. Sr. Duque de Z) e.g., The Most Ext The Duke of Medina Sidonia	Excelentísimo Señor	Duke or Don Name
Duchess	The Most Ext The Duchess of Z (Excma. Sra. Duquesa de Z) e.g., The Most Ext The Duchess of Alba	Excelentísima Señora	Duchess or Doña Name
Marquis Grandee of Spain	The Most Ext The Marquis of Z (Excmo. Sr. Marqués de Z) e.g., The Most Ext The Marquis of Villanueva del Duero	Excelentísimo Señor	Marquis or Don Name
Marquise Grandee of Spain	The Most Ext The Marquise of Z (Excma. Sra. Marquesa de Z) e.g., The Most Ext The Marquise of Santa Cruz	Excelentísima Señora	Marquise or Doña Name
Count Grandee of Spain	The Most Ext The Count of Z (Excmo. Sr. Conde de Z) e.g., The Most Ext The Count of Latores	Excelentísimo Señor	Count or Don Name
Countess Grandee of Spain	The Most Ext The Countess of Z (Excma. Sra. Condesa de Z) e.g., The Most Ext The Countess of Murillo	Excelentísima Señora	Countess or Doña Name
Viscount Grandee of Spain	The Most Ext The Viscount of Z (Excmo. Sr. Vizconde de Z) e.g., The Most Ext The Viscount of la Alborada	Excelentísimo Señor	Viscount or Don Name
Viscountess Grandee of Spain	The Most Ext The Viscountess of Z (Excma. Sra. Vizcondesa de Z) e.g., The Most Ext The Viscountess of la Alborada	Excelentísima Señora	Viscountess or Doña Name
Baron Grandee of Spain	The Most Ext The Baron of Z (Excmo. Sr. Barón de Z) e.g., The Most Ext The Baron of Llauri	Excelentísimo Señor	Baron or Don Name
Baroness Grandee of Spain	The Most Ext The Baroness of Z (Excma. Sra. Baronesa de Z) e.g., The Most Ext The Baroness of Viver	Excelentísima Señora	Baroness or Doña Name
Lord Grandee of Spain	The Most Ext The Lord of Z (Excmo. Sr. Señor de Z) e.g., The Most Ext The Lord of Meirás	Excelentísimo Señor	Lord or Don Name
Lady Grandee of Spain	The Most Ext The Lady of Z (Excma. Sra. Señora de Z) e.g., The Most Ext The Lady of Meirás	Excelentísima Señora	Lady or Doña Name
Marquis	The Most Ill The Marquis of Z (Ilmo. Sr. Marqués de Z) e.g., The Most Ill The Marquis of Boadilla del Monte	Ilustrísimo Señor	Marquis or Don Name
Marquise	The Most Ill The Marquise of Z (Ilma. Sra. Marquesa de Z) e.g., The Most Ill The Marquise of Cubas	Ilustrísima Señora	Marquise or Doña Name
Count	The Most Ill The Count of Z (Ilmo. Sr. Conde de Z) e.g., The Most Ill The Count of Motrico	Ilustrísimo Señor	Count or Don Name
Countess	The Most Ill The Countess of Z (Ilma. Sra. Condesa de Z) e.g., The Most Ill The Countess of Castillo Fiel	Ilustrísima Señora	Countess or Doña Name
Viscount	The Most Ill The Viscount of Z (Ilmo. Sr. Vizconde de Z) e.g., The Most Ill The Viscount of Santa Clara de Avedillo	Ilustrísimo Señor	Viscount or Don Name
Viscountess	The Most Ill The Viscountess of Z (Ilma. Sra. Vizcondesa de Z)	Ilustrísima Señora	Viscountess or Doña Name
Baron	The Most Ill The Baron of Z (Ilmo. Sr. Barón de Z)	Ilustrísimo Señor	Baron or Don Name
Baroness	The Most Ill The Baroness of Z (Ilma. Sra. Baronesa de Z)	Ilustrísima Señora	Baroness or Doña Name
Lord	The Most Ill The Lord of Z (Ilmo. Sr. Señor de Z)	Ilustrísimo Señor	Lord or Don Name
Lady	The Most Ill The Lady of Z (Ilma. Sra. Señora de Z)	Ilustrísima Señora	Lady or Doña Name
Grandee's male heir	The Most Ext Don X (Excmo. Sr. Don X)	Excelentísimo Señor	Don Name
Grandee's female heir	The Most Ext Doña Y (Excma. Sra. Doña Y)	Excelentísima Señora	Doña Name
Grandee's younger son	The Most Ill Don X (Ilmo. Sr. Don X)	Ilustrísimo Señor	Don Name
Grandee's younger daughter	The Most Ill Doña Y (Ilma. Sra. Doña Y)	Ilustrísima Señora	Doña Name
Male heir of a titled noble (no Grandee)	The Most Ill Don X (Ilmo. Sr. Don X)	Ilustrísimo Señor	Don Name
Female heir of a titled noble (no Grandee)	The Most Ill Doña Y (Ilma. Sra. Doña Y)	Ilustrísima Señora	Doña Name

== Knight and Dames of the Royal Orders ==
The three preeminent orders of merit bestowed by the Kingdom of Spain are, sorted by year of creation, the Order of Charles III (established in 1771), the Order of Isabella the Catholic (established in 1815), and the Order of Civil Merit (established in 1926). Members of these three orders are addressed as follows.

Position	On envelopes	Salutation in letter	Oral address
Knight of the Collar	The Most Ext (Excmo. Sr.)	Excelentísimo Señor	Excelencia
Dame of the Collar	The Most Ext (Excma. Sra.)	Excelentísima Señora	Excelencia
Knight Grand Cross	The Most Ext (Excmo. Sr.)	Excelentísimo Señor	Excelencia
Dame Grand Cross	The Most Ext (Excma. Sra.)	Excelentísima Señora	Excelencia
Knight Commander by Number	The Most Ext (Excmo. Sr.)	Ilustrísimo Señor	Don (only for Spanish citizens)
Dame Commander by Number	The Most Ext (Excma. Sra.)	Ilustrísima Señora	Doña (only for Spanish citizens)
Knight Commander	Señor (Sr.)	Señor	Don (only for Spanish citizens)
Dame Commander	Señora (Sra.)	Señora	Doña (only for Spanish citizens)
Knight Officer	Señor (Sr.)	Señor	Don (only for Spanish citizens)
Dame Officer	Señora (Sra.)	Señora	Doña (only for Spanish citizens)
Knight Cross	Señor (Sr.)	Señor	Don (only for Spanish citizens)
Dame Cross	Señora (Sra.)	Señora	Doña (only for Spanish citizens)

== Sources ==
- "Spanish Forms of Address". Cambridge University Press.
- "How do I address the Queen of Spain?". The Wrong Fork.
