= Order of Civil Merit =

Spanish order of merit

Royal Order of Civil Merit Real Orden del Mérito Civil
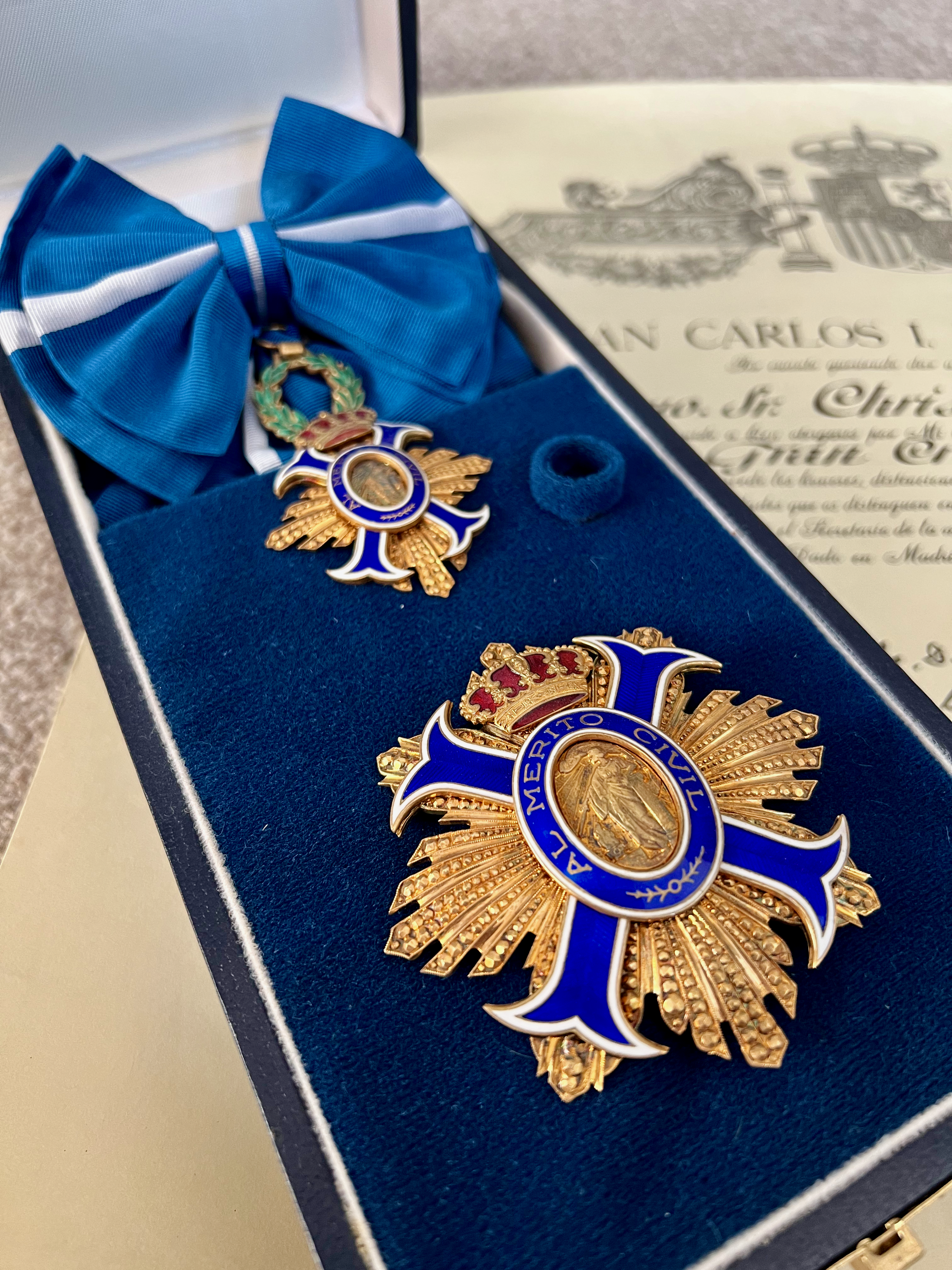
- Grand Cross set of insignia of the Order

Awarded by the King of Spain
- Type: Order of merit, knighthood
- Established: 1926; 100 years ago
- Royal house: House of Bourbon-Anjou
- Motto: "Al Mérito Civil"; For Civil Merit
- Eligibility: Spanish and Foreign citizens
- Awarded for: Extraordinary services for the good of the Nation
- Status: Currently Constituted
- Grand Master: King Felipe VI
- Grand Chancellor: José Manuel Albares, Minister of Foreign Affairs
- Chancellor: Under-Secretary of Foreign Affairs
- Grades: Collar; Grand-Cross; Commander by Number; Commander; Officer Cross; Cross; Silver Cross
- Post-nominals: OMC
- Former grades: Grand-Cross; Commander by Number; Commander; Knight; Silver Cross

Precedence
- Next (higher): De facto, there is no higher civil order. De jure, the Order of Charles III is the higher civil honour; however, it is almost exclusively granted to government ministers.
- Next (lower): Civil Order of Alfonso X, the Wise
- Equivalent: Order of Isabella the Catholic (for diplomatic relations)
- – The Ribbons of the Order

The Royal Order of Civil Merit (Spanish: Real Orden del Mérito Civil; Abbr.: OMC) is a knighthood, a state honour, and one of the three preeminent orders of merit bestowed by the Kingdom of Spain, alongside the Order of Charles III (established in 1771) and the Order of Isabella the Catholic (established in 1815). Each of the three orders aims to reward a distinct type of achievement. The Order of Charles III primarily honors heads of state and high-ranking government officials, while the Order of Isabella the Catholic primarily rewards services that strengthen diplomatic relations across the former Spanish Empire. In contrast, the Order of Civil Merit was created by King Alfonso XIII of Spain in 1926 to recognize "the civic virtues of the officials in the service of the State, as well as the extraordinary services of Spanish and foreign citizens for the good of the Nation." It was, therefore, founded as a modern order of merit, dedicated to acknowledging exceptional deeds for the benefit of civil society.

Royal Decree 2396/1998, enacted on 6 November 1998, regulates the Order today. In accordance with this law, the Order seeks to "reward merits of a civil nature, acquired by officers of any of the public Administrations [...], or by persons outside the Administration, who provide or have provided relevant services to the State, with extraordinary work, charitable initiatives, or with exemplary perseverance in the fulfillment of their duties." The Order "may also be granted to people of foreign nationality, provided that they have rendered distinguished services to Spain or notable collaboration in all matters that benefit the Nation".

The prestige that the Order of Civil Merit enjoys in Spain and internationally is due to several factors. First, as with the Order of Isabella the Catholic, it has become an instrument of international relations, with notable recipients worldwide. Second, it is a highly selective and rare honour . Since its creation, a relatively small number of people worldwide have received the Order of Civil Merit, compared to other national orders of merit with larger memberships, such as UK's Order of the British Empire, France's Legion of Honour, Germany's Order of Merit of the Federal Republic of Germany, or Italy's Order of Merit of the Italian Republic. Third, members of the Order enjoy various legal privileges, including a style of address, a heraldic achievement, and the exclusive right to wear the medal, rosette and ribbon of the Order.

== History ==
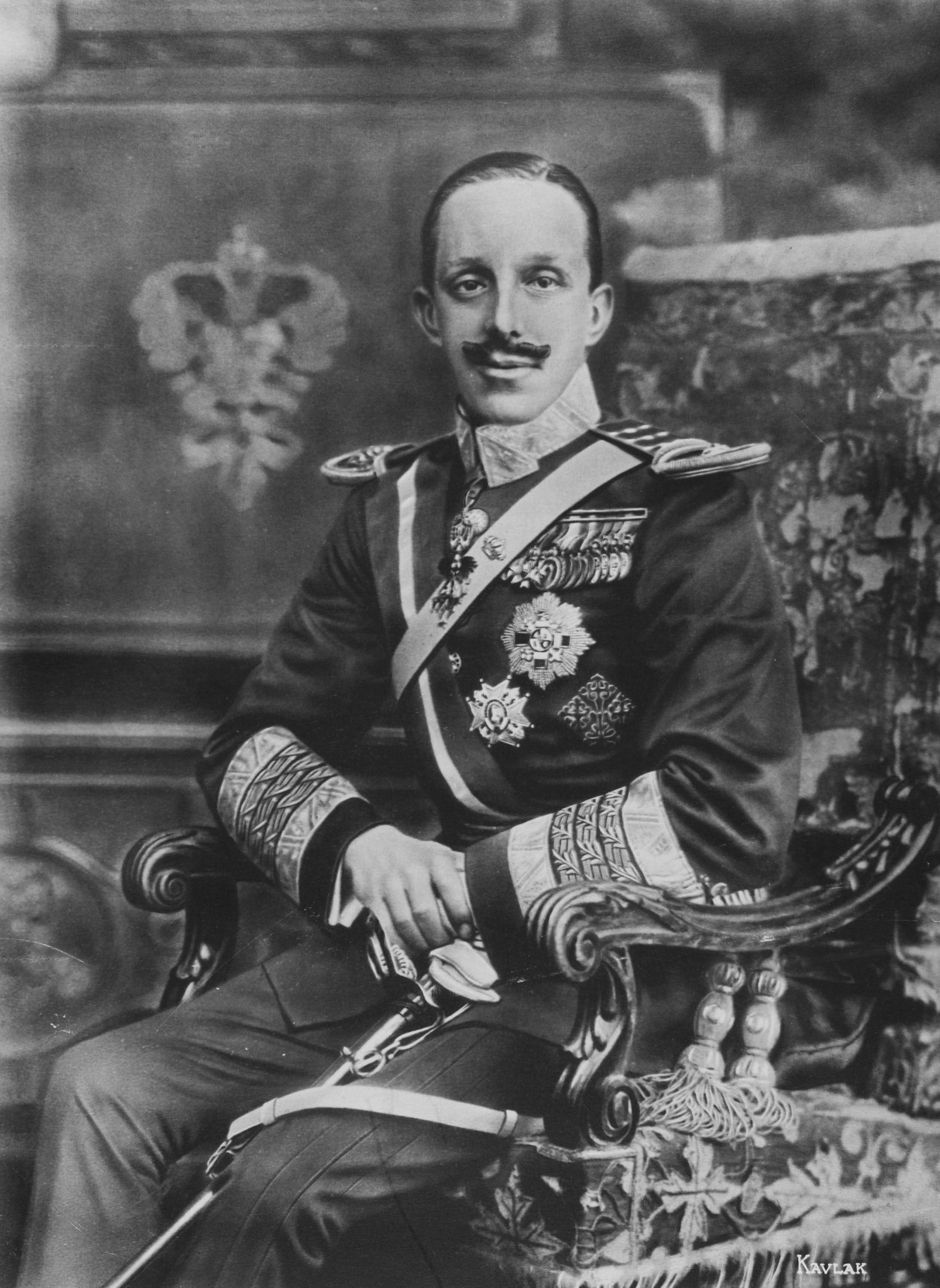
King Alfonso XIII, founder and first Grand Master of the Order of Civil Merit, wearing the sash of the Order (intense blue, with a narrow white stripe).

The Royal Order of Civil Merit was instituted by His Majesty King Alfonso XIII, by Royal Decree of 25 June 1926, at the proposal of the President of the Council of Ministers, General Miguel Primo de Rivera (1870–1930); its first Regulations were published on 25 May of the following year.

This Order was created to reward the civic virtues of civil servants serving the State, Province, or Municipality, as well as the extraordinary services performed by Spanish citizens for the benefit of the Nation. It could also be awarded to foreign citizens out of courtesy or reciprocity.

From its inception, it has been a highly coveted honor, bestowed upon a selective number of recipients in each category:

- Grand Cross, limited to 250 living members
- Commander by Number, limited to 350 living members
- Commander, limited to 500 living members
- Knight, limited to 1,000 living members
- Silver Cross, without limit

Entry into the Order was granted by the King, at the proposal of the Minister of State, requiring the agreement of the Council of Ministers when it came to the awarding of the Grand Cross. In all cases, a file was drawn up demonstrating the justification for the reward, and the appointments and diplomas were issued by the Chancellery and Orders Section of the Ministry of State.

The provisional government of the Republic, by Decree of 24 July 1931, abolished this and the other Orders dependent on the Ministry of State, except for the Order of Isabella the Catholic, and sought to replace them with the creation of the Order of the Republic.

After that interregnum, by Decree of 7 November 1942, the Order of Civil Merit was reinstated, with its previous characteristics, privileges, and seniority, with the following categories: Grand Cross, Band (designation of the Grand Cross when awarded to women), Commander by Number, Commander, Officer, Knight, Ribbon (designation of the Knight's degree when awarded to women), and Silver Cross. Its Regulations were approved by Decree of 3 February 1945.

Subsequently, by Decree of 26 July 1957, the category of Knight of the Collar was established in the Order of Civil Merit as the highest distinction of the Order. This high grade is reserved for decorating Sovereigns and Heads of State and, exceptionally, those of significant standing who already hold the Grand Cross of the Order.

The significant changes experienced since that date, both in the social and political reality of Spain and in the legal-administrative order, have advised updating the governing rules of the Order, respecting the spirit that animated its creation and preserving its seniority and its order of precedence among the other Spanish orders.

Thus, by Royal Decree 2396/1998, of 6 November, published in the BOE 279, of 21 November, and subsequent correction of errors published in the BOE 40, of 16 February 1999, the new Regulations of the Order have been approved, gathering in a single normative text all the previously scattered provisions.

Among the most notable novelties of the new Regulations, the suppression of the denominations of the degrees of Lady's Band, Knight's Cross, and Lady's Ribbon can be mentioned, integrating the first into the Grand Cross, and creating the grade of Cross, which would include the other two, to avoid possible interpretations that could consider that maintaining these denominations could imply some type of gender discrimination.

Additionally, decorated ladies are allowed, for aesthetic and functional reasons (given the characteristics of their gala attire), to use a reduced version of the insignia and to wear them differently from men, as specified for each grade in the new Regulations.

Furthermore, two new types of insignia are regulated, in the grade of Encomienda, to grant distinctions to legal entities: the Tie, intended for institutions that have recognized the use of flags or similar emblems, and the Honor Plaque for institutions that do not possess such emblems.

Lastly, to enhance the prestige of the distinctions of this Order and ensure that each is duly justified, the current Regulations introduce a detailed exposition of the merits to be considered for its award, the formal requirements that the admission and promotion proposals in the Order must meet, indicating the authorities authorized to make them, and the informational procedures that can be instructed to determine the appropriateness of the award.

== Governance ==
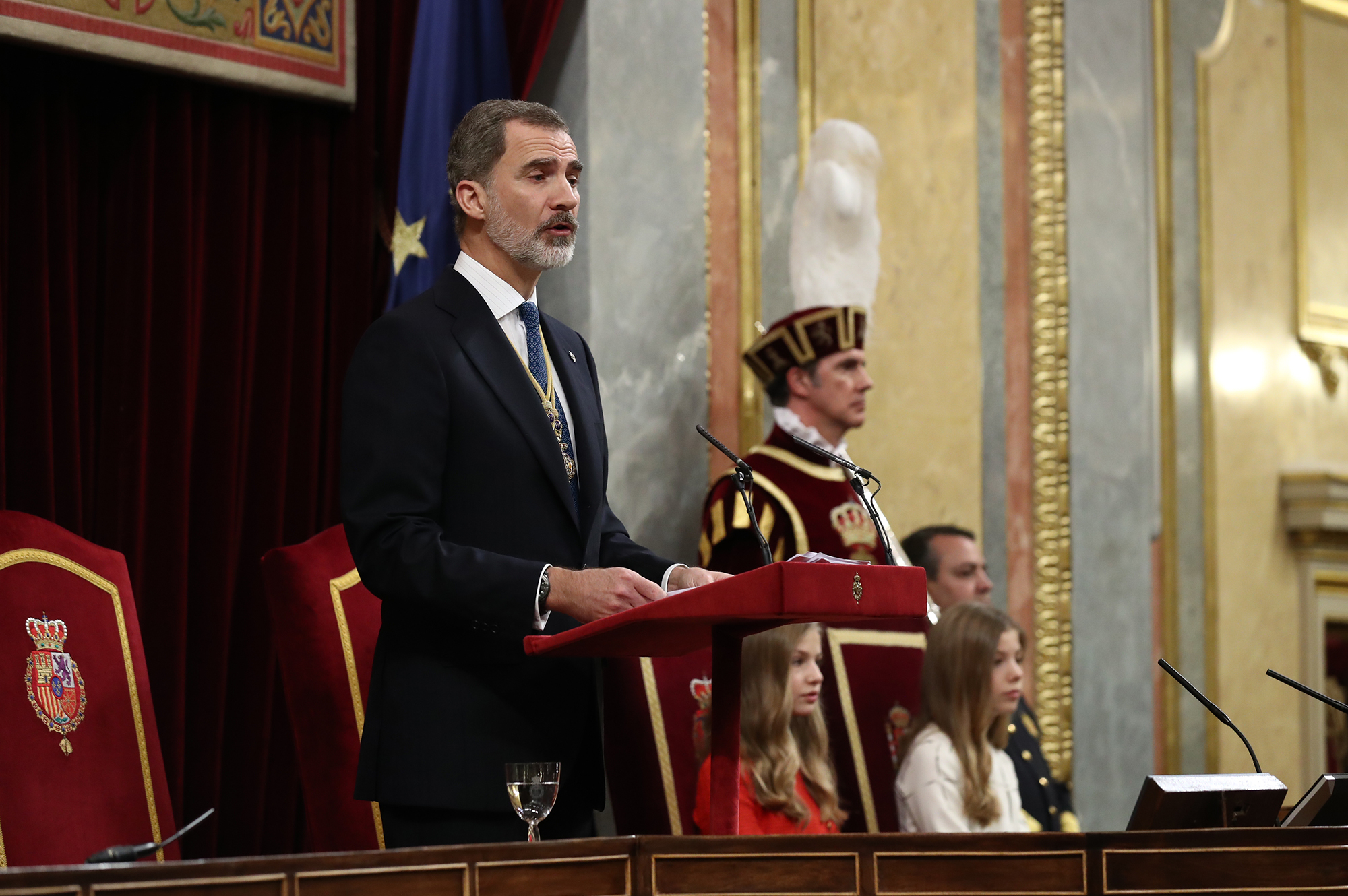
King Felipe VI is the current Grand Master of the Order of Civil Merit.

By law, His Majesty King Felipe VI is the Grand Master of the Order of Civil Merit and hence, and all the decorations of this Order are conferred in his name.

The Minister for Foreign Affairs, European Union and Cooperation is the Grand Chancellor of the Order, and it falls to him/her to propose to the Council of Ministers the award of the levels of the Collar and of the Grand Cross, and to award, on behalf of His Majesty the King, the lower levels of the Order. The Minister is also responsible for the protocol of the Order.

As in the case of the Order of Isabella the Catholic, the Under-Secretary of Foreign Affairs is the Chancellor of the Order of Civil Merit, but it corresponds to the Directorate-General for Protocol, Chancellery and Orders to evaluate all the proposed awards of the decorations of this Order, requesting the mandatory reports and evaluating the suitability or not of accepting these proposals.

== Recognized merits and awarding process ==
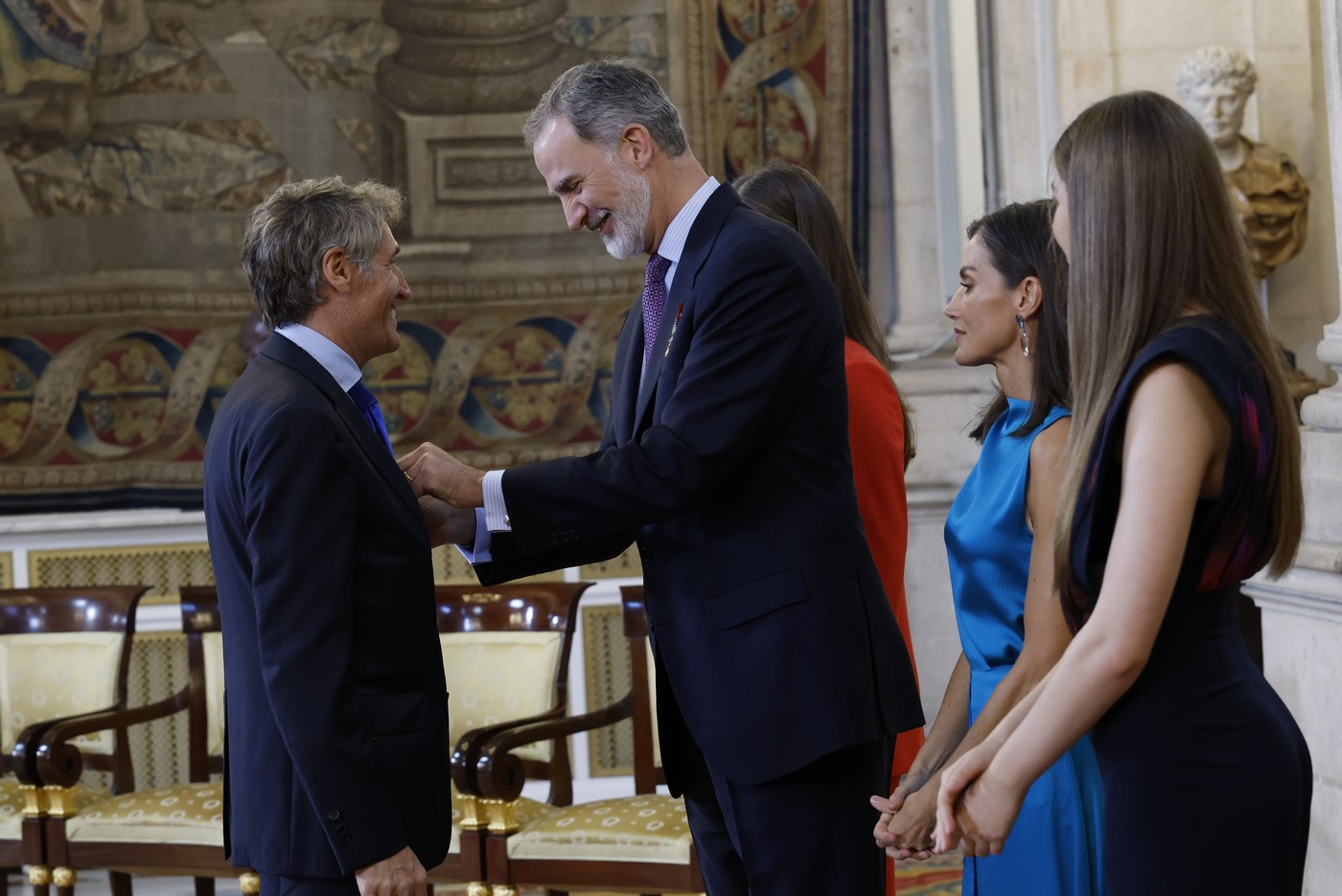
King Felipe VI conferring the Officer's Cross of the Order of Civil Merit.

In accordance with the law, the following merits will be taken into account for the awarding of decorations of this Order:

1. The provision of outstanding services of a civil nature to the State.
2. The performance of extraordinary works of undeniable merit.
3. Industriousness or extraordinary ability, demonstrated for the good of the general interest.
4. Great initiatives of national influence and, in general, exemplary acts that, benefiting the country, should be rewarded and encouraged.

To enhance the prestige of the awards of this Order, so that admission and promotion within it truly constitute an occasion that rewards the indicated merits, the Chancellery of the Order will ensure that each award is duly justified.

The Chancellery of the Order, located in the Directorate General of Protocol, Chancellery, and Orders of the Ministry of Foreign Affairs, will be responsible for processing all proposals for the awarding of decorations of the said Order, for which purpose it will conduct the appropriate procedures, being empowered to request reports from all kinds of courts, authorities, official centers, and entities that it deems convenient, in order to determine the appropriateness or otherwise of the granting.

Furthermore, the Chancellery will report on the appropriate grade, evaluating the importance of the merits acquired, the professional category and seniority of the proposed person, the age, and the decorations they may possess; it will submit a resolution proposal to the Minister of Foreign Affairs through the Under-Secretary of Foreign Affairs, Chancellor of the Order, and proceed with the issuance of the titles of the granted decorations.

The King of Spain, as Grand Master of the Order, bestows the medals upon the new knights and dames in an official ceremony held at the Royal Palace on 19 June each year (the anniversary of his proclamation as King). However, extraordinary ceremonies may be held at any time throughout the year, particularly for foreign recipients or Spaniards living abroad.

== Insignia, motif, and meaning ==
Emblem of the Knights and Dames of the Order of Civil Merit. The motif of the Order is a matron leaning on a column, with a sword in her right hand, tempered in the fire of sacrifice, as a symbol of civic virtues.

The Cross of the Order is made of gold, with dimensions of 48 x 50 mm. It is formed by four equal arms, in the shape of a saltire, enamelled in intense blue, and finally edged in white. Between these arms it carries five polished bursts of the same metal. In its center, it has an oval of intense blue enamel, bordered with white fillet, with the gold-colored inscription "To Civil Merit". Inside the oval, there is a die-cut in high relief, with the characteristic motif of the Order: a matron leaning on a column, with a sword in her right hand, tempered in the fire of sacrifice, as a symbol of civic virtues. Between the upper ends of the blades, it appears the Royal Crown of Spain. The entire set hangs from a green enamelled laurel wreath.

The ribbon of the Order is blue with a narrow white centre stripe, except for the ribbon of "Collar", which is blue with 2 white stripes on the edges. The blue colour symbolizes nobility, truth and justice, while the white colour represents purity, peace and integrity. Blue and white are also colours strongly associated with the House of Bourbon.

The elements in the motif of the Order have the following meaning:

- Matron: Represents the homeland (Spain), honour, dignity, maturity, wisdom, and nurturing qualities
- Leaning on a Column: Symbolizes the awardee, stability, support, strength, and the pillar upon which society stands
- Sword in Right Hand: Represents the State, justice, protection, and readiness to defend
- Tempered in the Fire of Sacrifice: Signifies strength gained through hardship, tested loyalty, dedication and purity

Overall, the Order's motif signifies civic and chivalric virtues such as justice, strength, stability, and dedication to the common good.

== Current grades ==
The Order of Civil Merit comes in seven classes, with the following insignia:

- Collar (Collar) – Order's Collar. In practice, this grade is reserved to heads of state.
- Grand Cross (Gran Cruz) – Sash and Plaque (Golden Order's Star).
- Commander by Number (Encomienda de Número) – Plaque (Silver Order's Star).
- Commander (Encomienda) – Golden Order's star on a necklet.
- Officer's Cross (Cruz de Oficial) – Golden Order's cross hanging from a ribbon.
- Cross (Cruz) – Silver Order's cross hanging from a ribbon.
- Silver Cross (Cruz de Plata) – Simpler silver cross hanging from a ribbon.

Insignia
Collar	Collar Grade Star	Grand Cross Star	Commander by Number Star
Commander	Officer's Cross	Cross	Silver Cross

== Legal rights and privileges ==
Heraldic achievement of the Most Excellent Lord Don Amancio Ortega Gaona, founder of Zara, Knight Grand Cross of the Order of Civil Merit.

By Royal Decree 2396/1998, the former rank of Knight's Cross (Caballero) was renamed as 'Cross' to accommodate female recipients. Accordingly, all ranks above the Silver Cross confer knighthood or damehood. For example, the recipient of a Collar is styled Knight or Dame of the Collar; the recipient of an Officer's Cross is styled Knight or Dame Officer, etc. (cf. Article 13).

Among the legal rights and privileges granted to Knights and Dames of the Order are the following. First, a style of address, in accordance with their rank (cf. Article 13):

- Knights of the Collar or Grand Cross are addressed as Excelentísimo Señor (Most Excellent Lord), and Dames of the Collar or Grand Cross are addressed as Excelentísima Señora (Most Excellent Lady). This is the same style given to a Duke or a Grandee.
- Knights Commander by Number are addressed as Ilustrísimo Señor (Most Illustrious Lord), and Dames Commander by Number are addressed as Ilustrísima Señora (Most Illustrious Lady). This is the same style given to a Marquess or a Count.
- All other Knights are addressed as Señor (Lord), and all other Dames are addressed as Señora (Lady).
- In addition to the above, members of the Order who are Spanish citizens are addressed with the honorific prefix Don (for Knights) or Doña (for Dames), in the same manner as Sir or Dame for knighted British nationals. Don/Doña is not just a courtesy, but a formal style granted to members of the Order, as part of the distinction.

Second, Knights and Dames are expected to wear the Order's insignia with formal attire, and the Order's rosette or ribbon with daily civilian or military attire, in accordance with their rank (cf. Article 11). Third, Knights and Dames receive an official diploma, issued on behalf of the Sovereign, certifying their appointment to the Order (cf. Article 9). Fourth, all Knights and Dames of the Order have the right to add the insignia of their rank to their coat of arms as a heraldic achievement. Fifth, it is customary for Knights and Dames to use the post-nominal letters "OMC" to indicate their membership in the Order (without distinction of rank).

== Grand Masters of the Order of Civil Merit ==
1. His Majesty Alfonso XIII, King of Spain (1886–1931)
2. His Excellency Francisco Franco, Head of the Spanish State (1936–1975)
3. His Majesty Juan Carlos I, King of Spain (1975–2014)
4. His Majesty Felipe VI, King of Spain (2014–present)

== Notable Knights and Dames of the Collar or Grand Cross ==
The Collar and Grand Cross of the Order have been awarded to royalty, heads of state and their spouses, and distinguished members of society, including:

=== Heads of State ===
Armorial of Sheikh Khalifa bin Zayed Al Nahyan, President of the United Arab Emirates and Emir of Abu Dhabi, embellished with the Collar of the Order of Civil Merit.

- 2023: João Lourenço and Ana Dias Lourenço, president and first lady of the Angola
- 2021: (South Korea) Moon Jae-in and Kim Jung-sook, president and first lady of the Republic of Korea
- 2012: Felipe Calderón Hinojosa, president of Mexico
- 2009: Sir Kenneth Hall and Lady Rheima Hall, governor-general and first lady of Jamaica
- 2010: Petro Poroshenko, president of Ukraine (then minister of foreign affairs)
- 2008: Sheikh Khalifa bin Zayed Al Nahyan, president of the United Arab Emirates
- 2007: (South Korea) Roh Moo-hyun and Kwon Yang-suk, president and first lady of the Republic of Korea
- 2003: Georgi Parvanov and Zorka Parvanova, president and first lady of Bulgaria
- 2003: Ion Iliescu, president of Romania
- 2003: Islom Karimov, president of Uzbekistan
- 2002: Abdelaziz Bouteflika, president of Algeria
- 1999: Petar Stoyanov and Antonina Stoyanova, president and first lady of Bulgaria
- 1996: Kim Young-sam, president of South Korea
- 1996: Leonid Kuchma and Lyudmila Kuchma, president and first lady of Ukraine
- 1994: Fidel V. Ramos and Amelita Ramos, president and first lady of the Philippines
- 1994: Maaouya Ould Sid'Ahmed Taya and Aïcha Mint Ahmed Tolba, president and first lady of Mauritania
- 1994: Árpád Göncz, president of Hungary
- 1993: Zhelyu Zhelev and Maria Zheleva, president and first lady of Bulgaria
- 1988: Bacharuddin Jusuf Habibie, president of Indonesia
- 1979: (Ivory Coast) Félix Houphouët-Boigny, president of Côte d'Ivoire
- 1978: Saddam Hussein, then vice president of Iraq
- 1968: Habib Bourguiba and Wassila Ben Ammar, president and first lady of Tunisia
- 1965: (Taiwan) Chiang Kai-shek, president of the Republic of China
- 1957: Camille Chamoun, president of Lebanon

=== Foreign Royalty ===
Armorial of Prince Joachim of Denmark, embellished with the Grand Cross of the Order of Civil Merit.

- 2023: Prince Joachim of Denmark
- 2023: Princess Marie of Denmark
- 2021: Prince Daniel, Duke of Västergötland of Sweden
- 2021: Princess Sofia, Duchess of Värmland of Sweden
- 2021: Prince Carl Philip, Duke of Värmland of Sweden
- 2008: H.H.E. Sheikh Sabah Al Ahmed Al Sabah of Kuwait
- 2008: (Emirate of Abu Dhabi) Crown Prince Mohammed bin Zayed of Abu Dhabi (later President of the UAE)
- 2008: (Emirate of Dubai) Crown Prince Hamdan bin Mohammed of Dubai
- 2006: Princess Märtha Louise of Norway
- 2000: King Mohammed VI of Morocco
- 2000: Princess Astrid of Belgium
- 2000: Prince Lorenz of Belgium
- 2000: Prince Laurent of Belgium
- 1999: Princess Alia and husband Mohammad Al-Saleh of Jordan
- 1995: King Ja'afar Yang di-Pertuan Agong of Malaysia
- 1995: Queen Najihah Raja Permaisuri Agong of Malaysia
- 1991: (Pahlavi dynasty) Prince Karin Aga Khan IV
- 1966: King Faisal of Saudi Arabia
- 1962: King Saud of Saudi Arabia
- 1960: King Rama IX of Thailand
- 1955: Princess Dina of Jordan (later Queen of Jordan)

=== Others ===
Posthumous armorial achievement of Don Ignacio Echeverría, embellished with his Knight Grand Cross of the Order of Civil Merit (Spain), Silver Medal of the Order of Police Merit (Spain) and George Medal (United Kingdom).

- 2026: David Obadía, president of the Federation of Jewish Communities of Spain
- 2025: Elke Büdenbender, Spouse of President of Germany
- 2025: (Israel) Daniel Barenboim, musician
- 2024: Hanke Bruins Slot, Minister of Foreign Affairs of The Netherlands
- 2022: Wolfgang Schmidt, Federal Minister for Special Affairs of Germany
- 2018: (Bangladesh) Monirul Islam, musician
- 2017: Nasrul Hamid, state minister of Bangladesh
- 2017: (Spain) Don Ignacio Echeverría, hero
- 2016: (Spain) Don Plácido Domingo, tenor and conductor
- 2015: Sushma Swaraj, minister of External Affairs of India
- 2015: Mohamed Salem Ould Béchir, interior minister of Mauritania
- 2013: (Lebanon) Fadi Al-Atrash Joumblatt, musician
- 2009: (Spain) Don Amancio Ortega, founder of multinational fashion company Zara
- 2007: (Philippines) Miriam Defensor Santiago, Filipino stateswoman
- 2005: (Morocco) Abderrahim Harouchi, Moroccan minister of public health
- 2005: (United Kingdom) Yehudi Menuhin, violinist and conductor
- 1995: (Spain) Don Miguel Indurain, five-times winner of the Tour de France
- 1995: Mahathir Mohamad, prime minister of Malaysia
- 1982: (Colombia) Germán Arciniegas, Colombian essaist and historian
- 1976: (United Kingdom) Lord Killanin, president of the IOC
- 1973: (El Salvador) Ricardo Armando Novoa Arciniegas, Salvadorian politician
- 1966: (Spain) Don Joaquín Rodrigo, composer
- 1968: Habib Bourguiba Jr., minister of foreign affairs of Tunisia
- 1959: (Spain) Don Juan Antonio Samaranch, president of the IOC
- 1948: (United States) J. Hunter Guthrie, American philosopher

== Death of Members ==
Article 12 of the Royal Decree 2396/1998 establishes that upon the death of those awarded the rank of Collar, their heirs are obliged to promptly return the insignia to the Chancellery of the Order. This return will be made through the Spanish Diplomatic Representations or Consular Offices abroad, if the relatives reside outside Spain. The Chancellery of the Order will issue the corresponding document, which accredits said return. The death of those awarded the other ranks does not oblige their heirs to return the insignia, although the death must be communicated to the Chancellery of the Order by the same procedure indicated above, for due record.

== Rescission of Distinctions ==
Article 14 of the Royal Decree 2396/1998 establishes that the person decorated with any grade of the Order of Civil Merit who is convicted of a criminal act, by virtue of a final sentence, may be deprived of the title and the privileges and honors inherent to their status. To this end, the Chancellery of the Order may initiate the corresponding informative procedure, in which the interested party will be given a hearing. The removal will be agreed upon by the Minister of Foreign Affairs for the grades of Commander by Number, Commander, Officer's Cross, Cross, and Silver Cross, and by the Council of Ministers for the grades of Collar and Grand Cross.

== Gallery ==
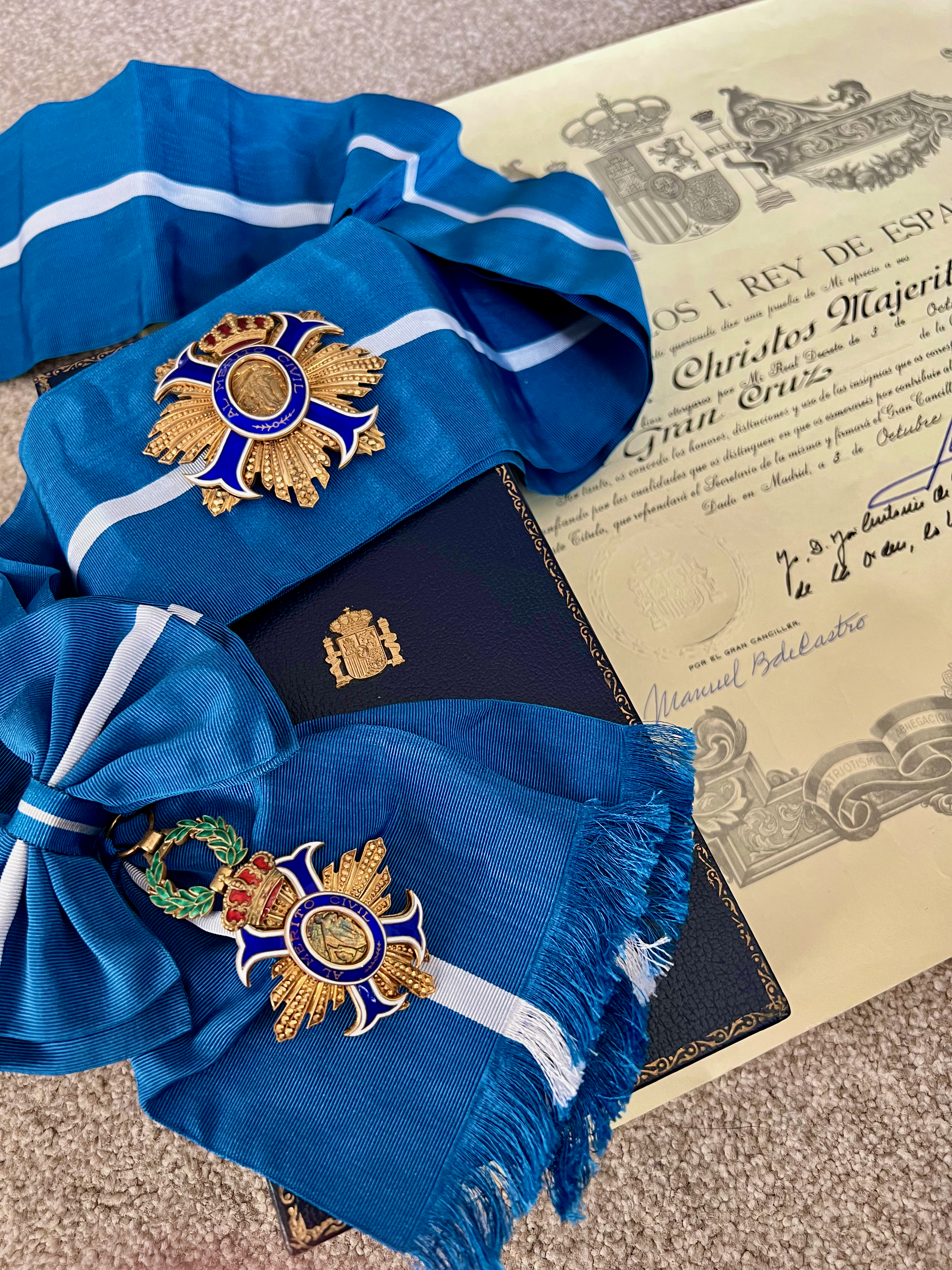
Grand Cross set with bestowal document

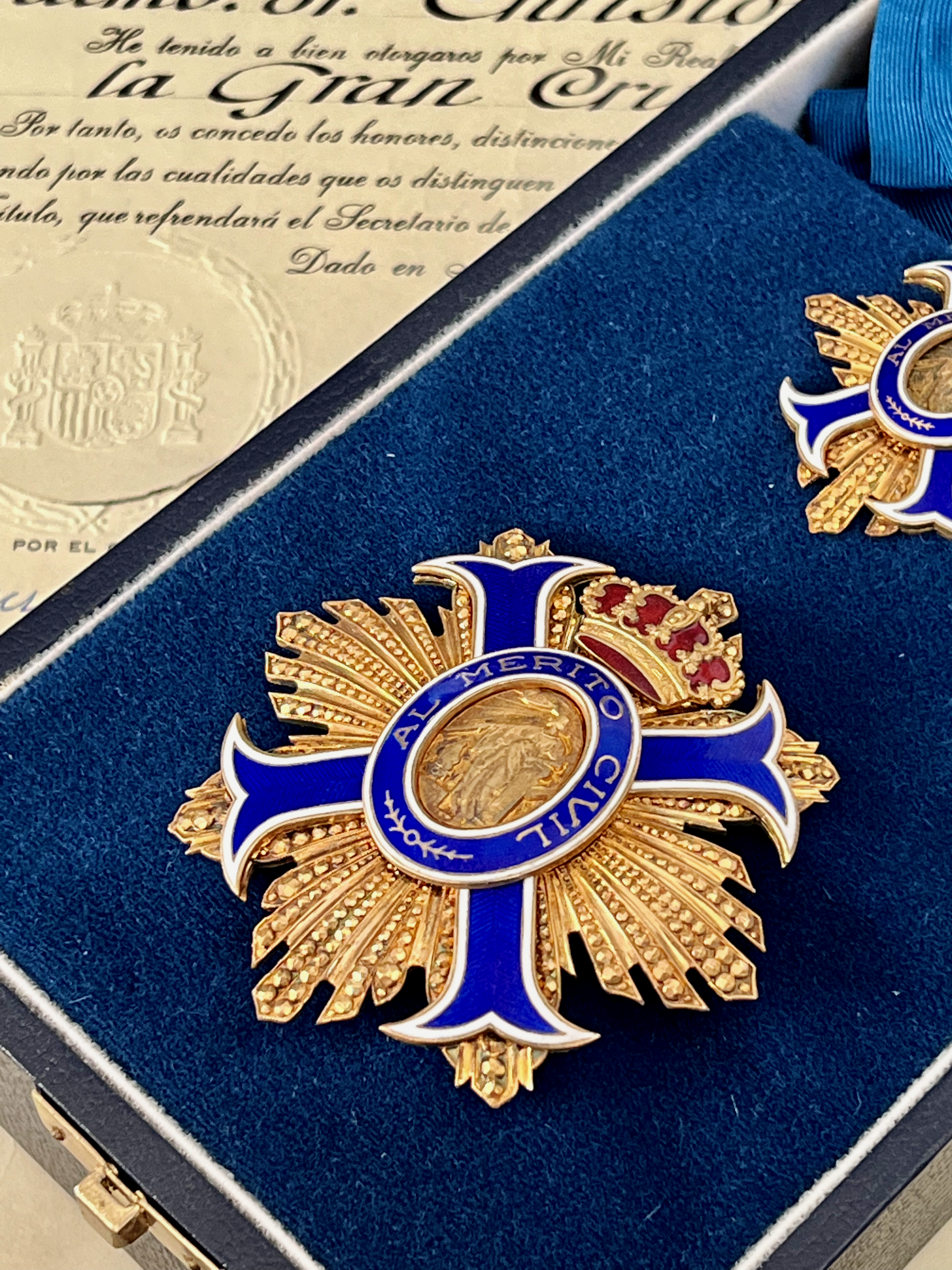
Breast Star of the Grand Cross grade

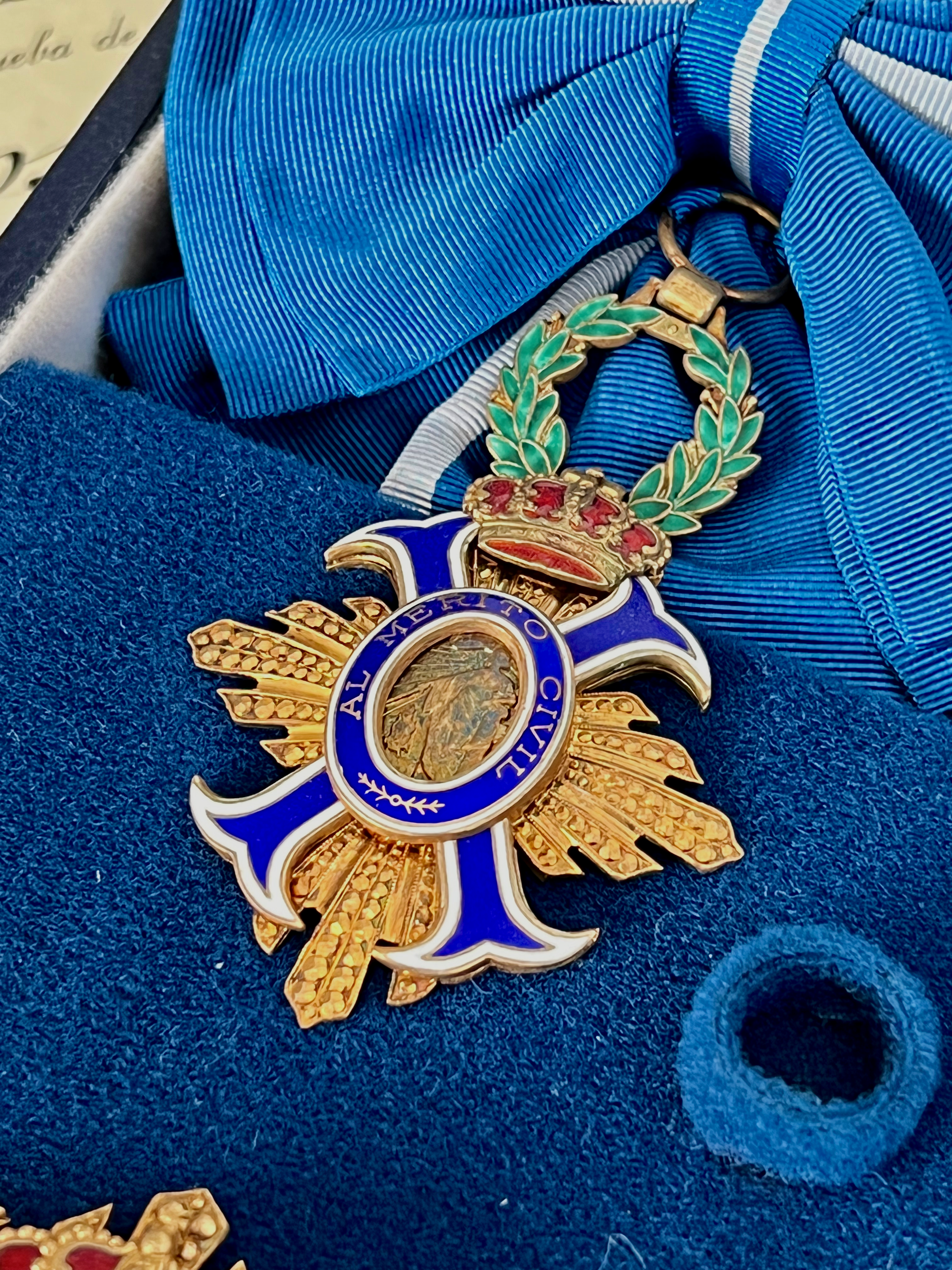
Grand Cross badge of the Order

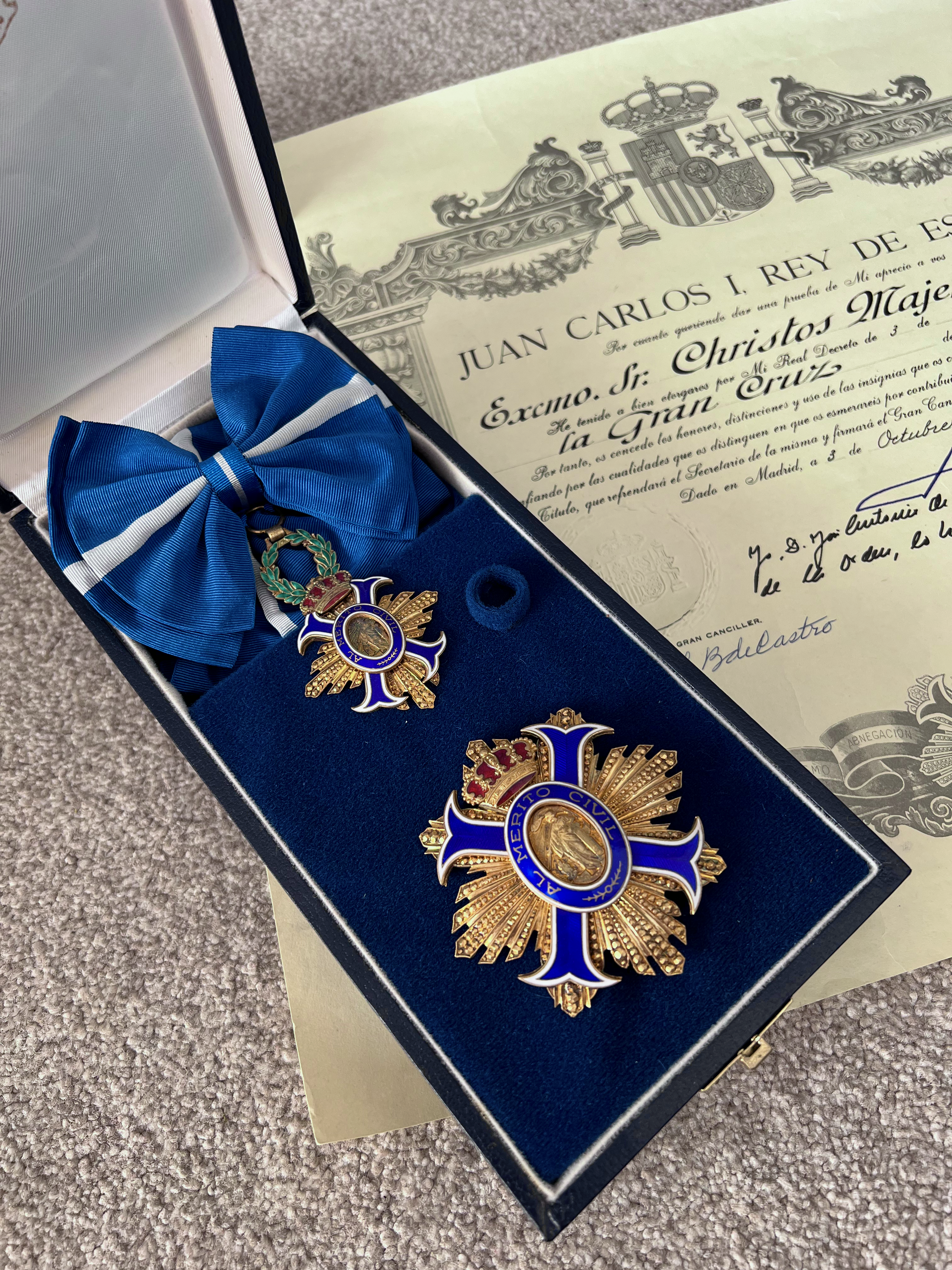
Grand Cross set of insignia

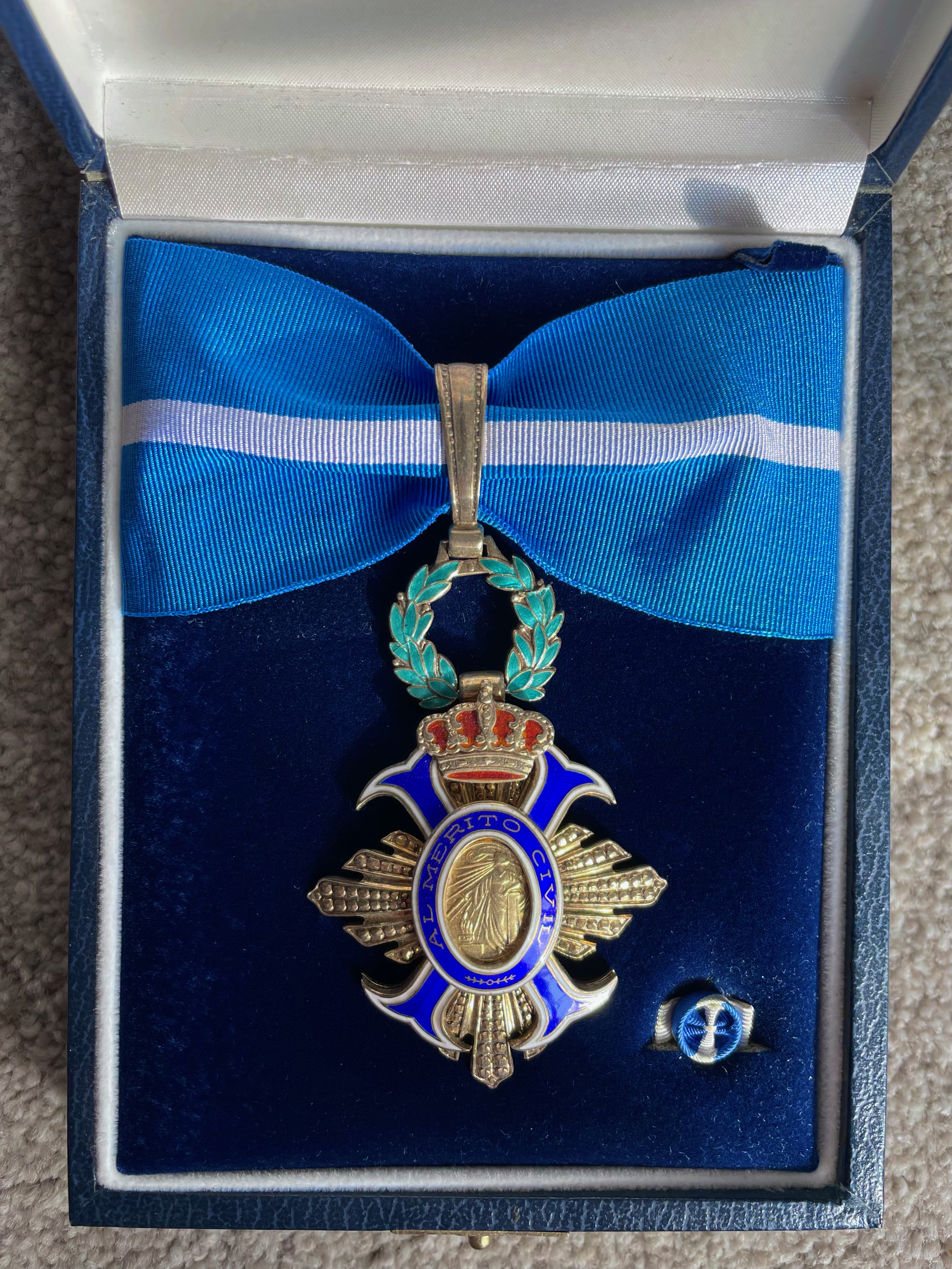
Commander grade of the Order

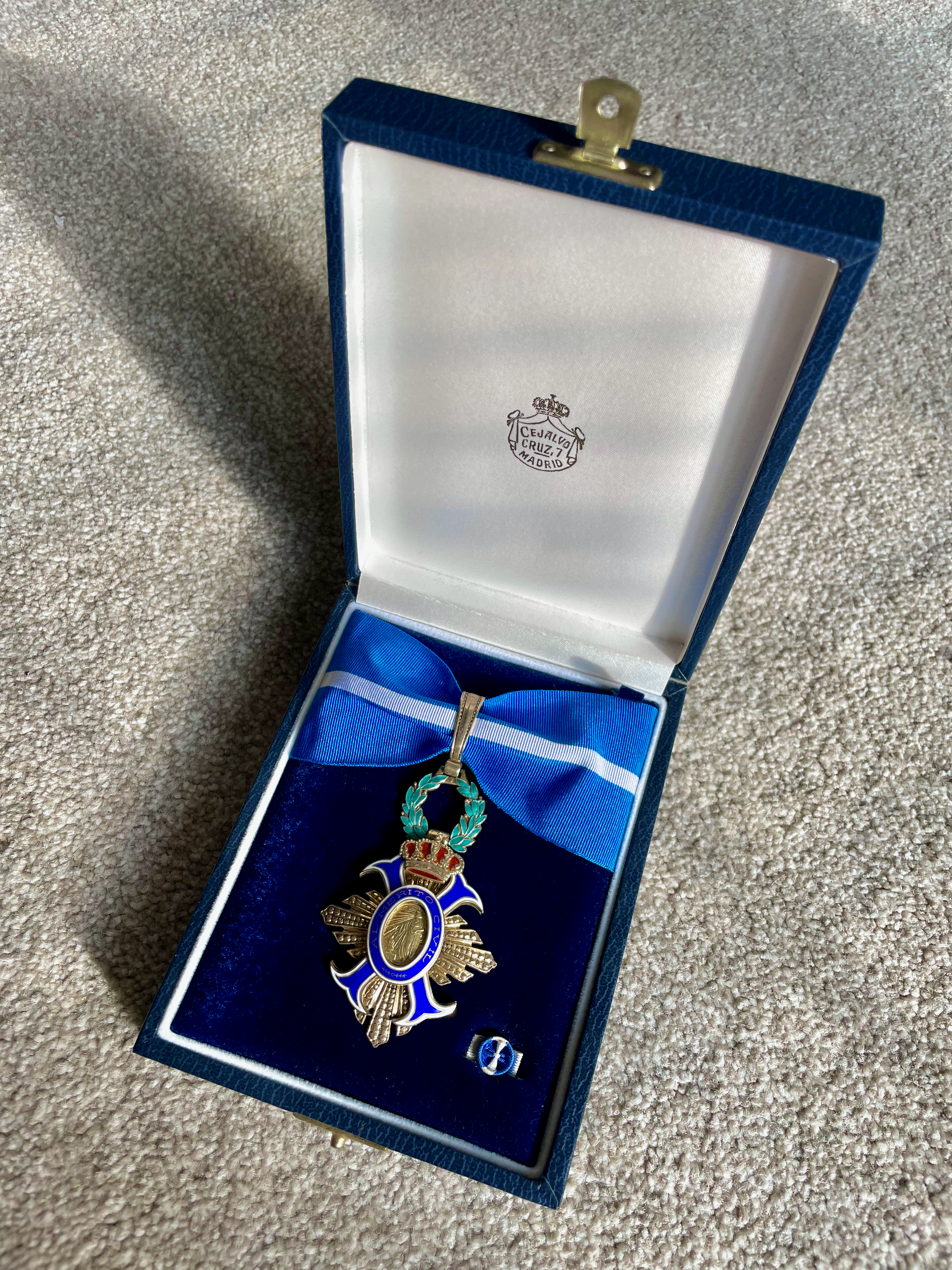
Set of the Commander grade

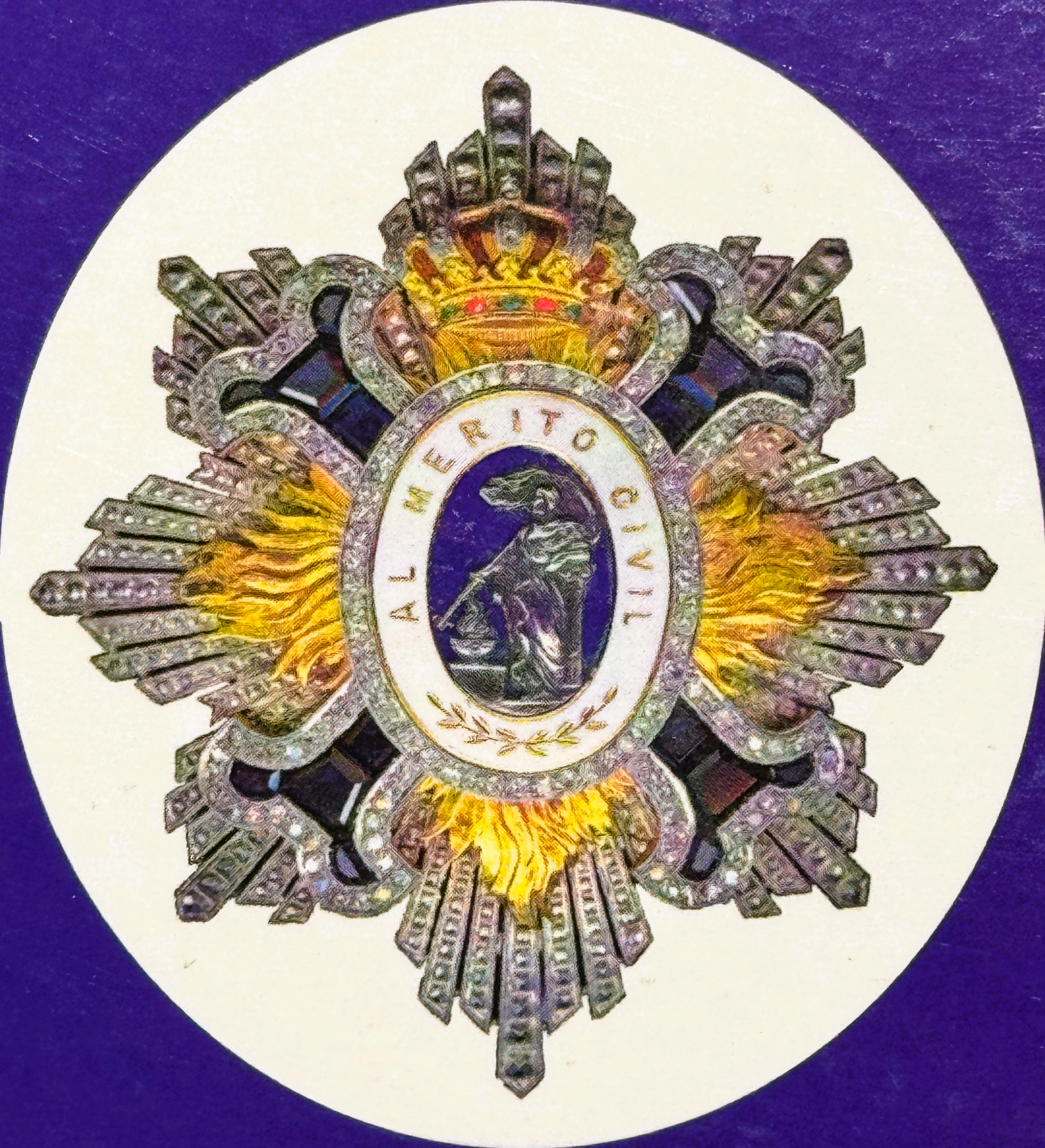
Original design of the Star of the Royal Order of Civil Merit (1926)
