= Stephen Gooden =

English artist, engraver, illustrator and designer of banknotes

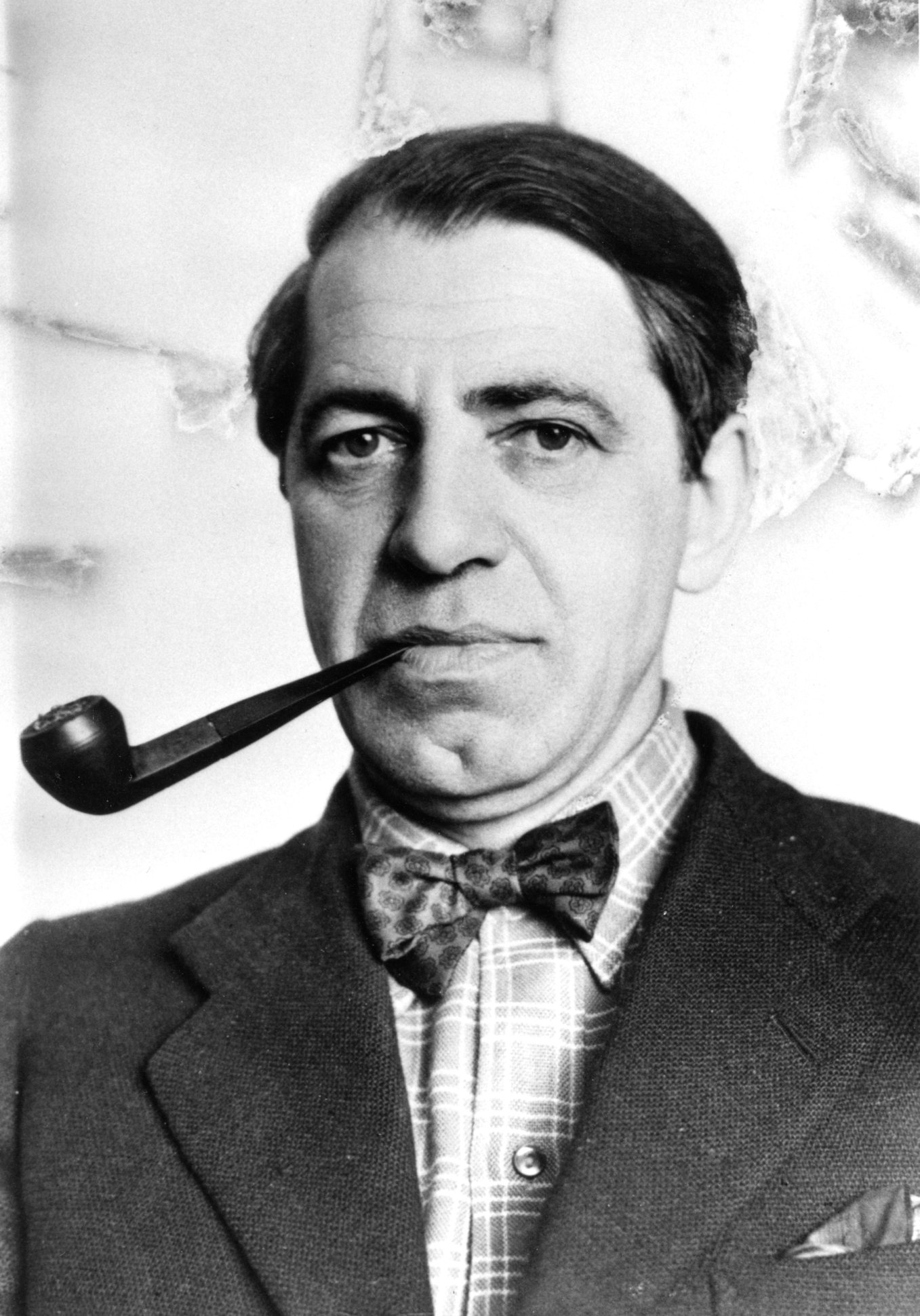
- Stephen Gooden in the 1940s
- Born: 9 October 1892; Tulse Hill, London, England
- Died: 21 September 1955 (aged 62); Chesham Bois, Buckinghamshire, England
- Education: Rugby School, Slade School of Fine Art
- Occupations: Artist and engraver
- Spouse: Mona Steele Price

Stephen Frederick Gooden CBE, RA, RE (born Tulse Hill, London, 9 October 1892, died Chesham Bois, Buckinghamshire, 21 September 1955) was an English artist, engraver, illustrator and designer of banknotes. He was elected a fellow of the Royal Society of Painter-Etchers and Engravers in 1933 and a Fellow of the Royal Academy in 1946. He was created a Commander of the British Empire in the 1942 Birthday Honours.

== Early life ==
Gooden was the son of a picture dealer, Stephen Thomas Gooden (1856–1909), who joined Frederick W. Fox to create the company Gooden and Fox. S. F. Gooden was educated at Rugby School and studied at the Slade School of Fine Art from 1909 to 1913. He served in the Royal Engineers during World War I.

== Work ==
Gooden was best known as an engraver, mostly on copper. His designs have been described as finely engraved, witty and inventive. He was associated with the Nonesuch Press in its early years for which he provided decorations and title pages, and he illustrated fine editions of the King James Bible (1924) and the odes of Anacreon (1923). He designed banknotes for the Bank of England, but only one was issued, and for several other countries. He also designed and engraved many pictorial and armorial bookplates including designs for Princess Elizabeth, Stephen Courtauld and several others. Gooden's design of St George and the dragon on the bookplate for the Royal Library at Windsor Castle was used as the basis for the design of the reverse of the George Medal, for which he was awarded the CBE.

Gooden's work can be found in the collections of the British Museum and the Victoria and Albert Museum in London, the Fitzwilliam Museum, Cambridge, the Ashmolean Museum, Oxford, and the Museum of Fine Arts, Boston, USA.

== Personal life ==
In 1925 he married the Irish poet Mona Steele Price (1894–1958) for whom he illustrated an anthology of poems that she selected about cats. They had no children.

== Bibliography ==
- Campbell Dodgson (1944). An Iconography of the Engravings of Stephen Gooden. London: Elkin Matthews.
