= Ahmad Musa Jibril =

Palestinian-American Islamic preacher

Ahmad Musa Jibril (alt. Jebril, born 1972), also known as Abu Khaled, is a Palestinian-American Islamic radical preacher, cleric, sheikh, and imam. In 2004 he was convicted on 42 charges including fraud. Ideologically influenced by the Sahwa movement, which combines the Islamist revolutionary ideology of Sayyid Qutb mixed with Saudi Wahabbism, he promotes Salafist militant Islamism, and has extensively preached about the Syrian Civil War in highly emotive pro-Sunni terms. While not known to be affiliated directly to any particular group, it has been claimed that he has been an inspirational source for many English speaking pro-Sunni jihadist fighters in Syria, in both al-Nusra and Islamic State of Iraq and the Levant, and elsewhere.

== Early life and education ==
Born in Dearborn, Michigan in 1972, as a child Jibril lived for some time in Medina, Saudi Arabia where his father was enrolled in the Islamic University of Madinah. Jibril then returned to the U.S. to complete his high school education, which he completed in 1989. He later returned to Medina to study at the Islamic University of Madinah, receiving a degree in sharia. He subsequently received from a law school in Michigan a JD and LLM.

In the mid to late 1990s, Jibril created the website AlSalafyoon.com which contained videos of Islamic preachers described by US prosecutors as "a library of fanatically anti-American sermons" in which he "encouraged his students to spread Islam by the sword, to wage a holy war [and] to hate and kill non-Muslims". The website ceased operations following his arrest and incarceration in 2003 to 2004.

The day after a November 13, 1995 bomb attack that killed six people, including four Americans, in Riyadh, Jibril, using a phone line subscribed under the alias Thomas Saad, sent a fax to CNN saying that its purpose was to "kick the Jews and Christians out of the Arabian Peninsula" as commanded by Muhammad. It closed, "There will be a series of bombings that will follow no matter how many lives of ours are taken or how many bodies are in prison. This is the precise reason why we chose the building we chose." However, the government found no evidence that Jibril was connected to the actual bombing beyond sending a fax, and did not prosecute him, though it later made reference to the fax in a 2005 supplemental sentencing memorandum for the 2003-5 criminal trial.

== Conviction and imprisonment ==
In 2004, Jibril and his father were together tried in Detroit for a total of 42 criminal charges, of the crimes; conspiracy, bank fraud, wire fraud, money laundering, failure to file income tax returns and felon-in-possession of firearms and ammunition. Jibril was convicted and sentenced for these crimes, to six and one half years in a high-security prison, and was subsequently imprisoned at Terre Haute Federal Correctional Complex, from where he was released sometime during 2012. Jibril's Federal Bureau of Prisons inmate locator number was 31943–039.

Just prior to his sentencing, the prosecution provided a memorandum to refute the Jibrils' claims which were aimed at lowering the punishment. In it, they documented how at one point the postman had realized that he was delivering mail addressed to more than 80 different aliases, and how investigators had discovered at his sister's house voter registration cards under alias known to be employed by Jibril. Jibril supported himself and his family members by "systematically destroying... rental properties for the insurance proceeds, and bullying and threatening tenants in the process."

== Recent influence ==
Within days following his 2012 release from prison, he began posting his views online, producing YouTube videos and operating on social media. He is reportedly on the FBI's watch list. In June 2014 he had his Internet access restricted for a probation violation. These restrictions expired in March 2015. Between June 2014 and June 2017, Jibril is not known to have accessed his primary Facebook account.

Scholars at King's College London describe him as a non-conventional proselytiser, who "does not openly incite his followers to violence" and "adopts the role of a cheerleader: supporting the principles of armed opposition to Assad, often in highly emotive terms, while employing extremely charged religious or sectarian idioms. The general demeanour of his posturing towards the West is confrontational and distrusting, fuelling the perception of a Western conspiracy against both Islam and Muslims."

A survey conducted by The International Centre for the Study of Radicalisation and Political Violence indicated that approximately 60% of 150 foreign fighters in the Syrian Civil War followed Jibril on their Twitter accounts. His Twitter account has more than 33,000 followers and his Facebook account had over 145,000 likes.

Jibril was reported to be an influence for terrorists in the United States as early as fall 2014, in which there was a sharia-inspired beheading at an Oklahoma meatpacking plant, and indictment on charges of attempted murder and trying to fund ISIS of Yemeni immigrant pizza-shop manager Mufid Elfgeeh. Elfgeeh later earned 22 years in prison for his troubles, which included efforts to recruit jihadists on Twitter, WhatsApp and on 23 distinct Facebook accounts.

In May 2016, the Australian Attorney-General disclosed as part of a terrorist conspiracy trial that a "self-styled Facebook preacher" used that medium to spread an "order to hate all non-Muslims", and that on his FB page were interspersed video calls to jihad by Ahmad Musa Jibril.

The Attorney-General for India listed in August 2016 Jibril as one of 14 individual disseminators of ISIS propaganda in the trial of Mohammad Farhan. It was written in the charge sheet that:

Farhan created ... his Facebook account ... in August 2014, primarily to follow IS-related posts, images, videos and online lectures of ... and Ahmad Jibril, who supported and justified the terrorist activities of IS through Quran and Hadees [sic; read Hadith]... ... Farhan, under the influence of these Islamic preachers and having been impressed by the lectures of above speakers, became a supporter and follower of ISIS from September 2014.

One of the June 2017 London attackers was said to have been radicalised by Jibril's YouTube videos.

== YouTube policy and criticism ==
After conducting a review in June 2017 following the London Bridge massacre, YouTube refused to remove Jibril's videos, which had been viewed more than 1.5 million times as of that date, as they did not violate YouTube's guidelines on the advocacy of violence. YouTube has stated that most of Jibril's videos are religious sermons on varied subjects such as interpretation of the Quran, Islamic behavior, fasting, and western medicine.

YouTube's response has faced criticism and calls for more robust action. Conservative columnist Michelle Malkin said "One of the many maddening takeaways from the London Bridge jihad attack is this: If you post videos on YouTube radicalizing Muslim viewers to kill innocent people, YouTube will leave you alone. But if you post a video on YouTube honoring innocent people murdered by barbaric jihadists, your video will get banned." and that "The enlightened peace-and-love progressives of Silicon Valley don't just have egg on their faces. They have blood on their hands."

Advertisers on YouTube have objected to having their ads alongside alleged hate videos, including Jibril.

On 18 June 2017, responding to criticism, YouTube announced a new policy under which extremist videos, such as Jibril's, while not removed from the site would be difficult to find, with warning labels, and without user endorsements, comments, nor advertising.
