= George Medal =

British award for gallantry, established in 1940

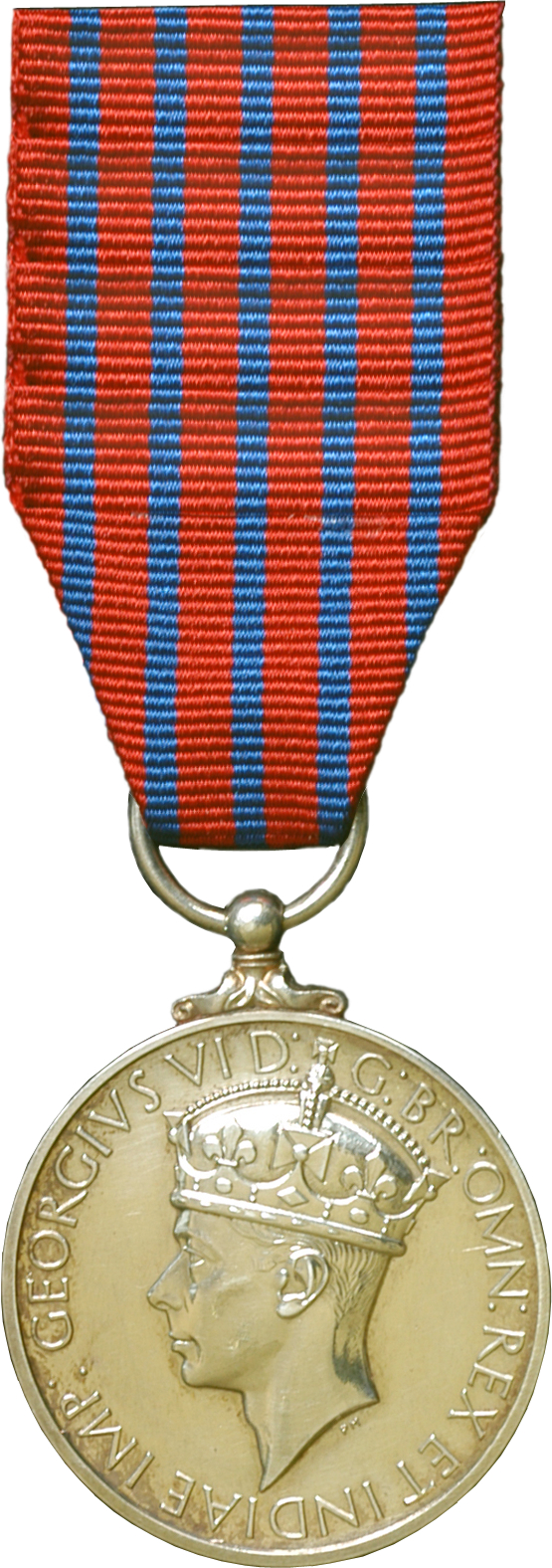
- Obverse and reverse of the original medal, reflecting the then reigning monarch King George VI
- Type: Civil decoration
- Awarded for: "... acts of great bravery"
- Description: Silver disc, 36 mm diameter
- Presented by: United Kingdom of Great Britain and Northern Ireland and Commonwealth
- Eligibility: Those performing acts of bravery in, or meriting recognition by, the United Kingdom
- Post-nominals: GM
- Status: Currently awarded
- Established: 24 September 1940

Highlights
- Total: Approx 2,122; About half awarded to civilians 27 bars for second award
- Ribbon bar of the George Medal Ribbon of the GM and bar

Order of Wear
- Next (higher): Conspicuous Gallantry Medal (Flying)
- Next (lower): King's Police Medal, for Gallantry
- Related: George Cross

The George Medal (GM), instituted on 24 September 1940 by King George VI, is a decoration of the United Kingdom and Commonwealth, awarded for gallantry, typically by civilians, or in circumstances where military honours are not appropriate.

== History ==
In 1940, at the height of the Blitz, there was a strong desire to reward many acts of civilian courage. Existing awards open to civilians were not considered suitable to meet the new situation, so the George Cross and the George Medal were instituted to recognise civilian gallantry in the face of enemy bombing, and brave deeds more generally.

Announcing the new awards, the King said

In order that they should be worthily and promptly recognised, I have decided to create, at once, a new mark of honour for men and women in all walks of civilian life. I propose to give my name to this new distinction, which will consist of the George Cross, which will rank next to the Victoria Cross, and the George Medal for wider distribution.

The warrant for the GM (along with that of the GC), dated 24 January 1941, was published in The London Gazette on 31 January 1941.

== Criteria ==
The medal is granted in recognition of "acts of great bravery". The original warrant for the George Medal did not explicitly permit it to be awarded posthumously. The position was clarified in December 1977 expressly to allow posthumous awards, several of which have subsequently been made.

The medal is primarily a civilian award, but it may be awarded to military personnel for gallant conduct that is not in the face of the enemy. As the warrant states:

The Medal is intended primarily for civilians and award in Our military services is to be confined to actions for which purely military Honours are not normally granted.

Recipients are entitled to the post-nominal letters GM.

Bars to the GM may be awarded in recognition of further acts of bravery meriting the award. In undress uniform or on occasions when the medal ribbon alone is worn, a silver rosette is worn on the ribbon to indicate each bar.

Details of all awards to British and Commonwealth recipients are published in The London Gazette. Approximately 2,124 medals have been awarded since inception in 1940, with 27 second-award bars, the most recent being two announced in 2025.

== Description ==
The GM is a circular silver medal 36 mm (1.4 in) in diameter, with the ribbon suspended from a ring. It has the following design.

The obverse depicts the crowned effigy of the reigning monarch, using the designs of Percy Metcalfe (George VI), Cecil Thomas (Elizabeth II) and Charles III. To date, there have been five types:

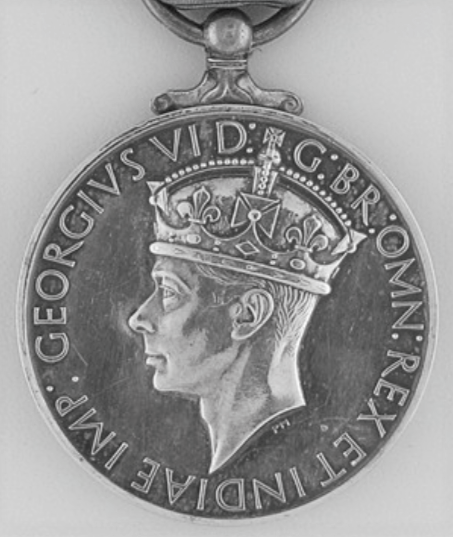
George VI, 1940 to 1948. Inscribed GEORGIVS VI D: G: BR: OMN: REX ET INDIAE IMP:

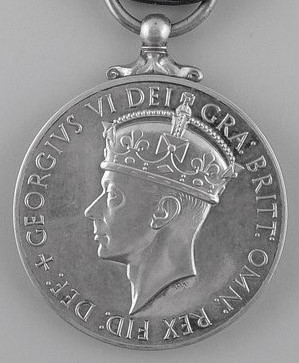
George VI, 1948 to 1952. Inscribed GEORGIVS VI DEI: GRA: BRITT: OMN: REX FID: DEF:

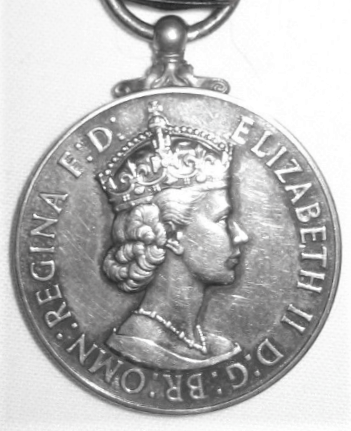
Elizabeth II, 1952 to late 1950s. Inscribed ELIZABETH II D: G: BR: OMN: REGINA F.D.

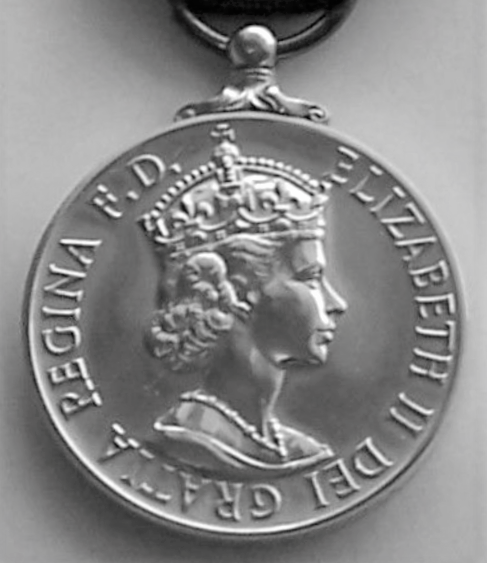
Elizabeth II, late 1950s to date. Inscribed ELIZABETH II DEI GRATIA REGINA F.D.

The reverse shows Saint George on horseback slaying the dragon on the coast of England, with the legend THE GEORGE MEDAL around the top edge of the medal.

The reverse of the medal was designed by George Kruger Gray based on a bookplate designed by Stephen Gooden for the Royal Library at Windsor Castle.

The ribbon is 31.7 mm (1.25 in) wide, crimson with five narrow blue stripes. The blue colour is taken from the George Cross ribbon. The medal is worn on the left chest by men; women not in uniform wear the medal on the left shoulder, with the ribbon fashioned into a bow.

The name of the recipient is engraved on the rim of the medal, although some Army awards have impressed naming.

== Recipients ==
Posthumous armorial achievement of Ignacio Echeverría embellished with his Grand Cross of the Order of Civil Merit (Spain), Silver Medal of the Order of Police Merit (Spain) and George Medal

The first recipients, listed in The London Gazette of 30 September 1940, were Chief Officer Ernest Herbert Harmer and Second Officer Cyril William Arthur Brown of the Dover Fire Brigade, and Section Officer Alexander Edmund Campbell of the Dover Auxiliary Fire Service, who on 29 July had volunteered to return to a ship loaded with explosives in Dover Harbour to fight fires aboard while an air raid was in progress. Seven other people were also awarded the medal, including the first women; Ambulance Driver Dorothy Clarke and Ambulance Attendant Bessie Jane Hepburn of Aldeburgh, Suffolk, for rescuing a man badly injured in an explosion.

The first recipient chronologically was Coxswain Robert Cross, commander of the RNLI lifeboat City of Bradford, based at Spurn Point, whose award was gazetted on 7 February 1941. It was awarded for an incident on 2 February 1940 when Cross took the lifeboat out in gale force winds, snow squalls, and very rough seas to rescue the crew of a steam trawler.

The youngest recipient was Charity Bick, who lied about her age to join the ARP service at 14 years old, and who delivered several messages by bicycle during a heavy air raid in West Bromwich in late 1940. The youngest male was 14-year-old schoolboy Brian Gibbons who saved his infant nephew when his house caught fire following the 1958 Independent Air Travel Vickers Viking crash in Southall in 1959.

The first person to receive a second award was George Samuel Sewell, an engineer working for Shell-Mex and BP Ltd., based at the oil terminal at Salt End, near Hull, for his actions during an air raid. Having been one of the first recipients (in September 1940), his bar to the George Medal was gazetted on 4 July 1941.

The 75th anniversary, in 2015, of the award's creation was marked by a ceremony in London.

== See also ==
- Orders and decorations of the Commonwealth realms

== Bibliography ==
- Abbott, P.E.; Tamplin, J.M.A. (1981). British Gallantry Awards. London: Nimrod Dix and Co. ISBN 9780902633742.
- Dorling, H. Taprell, (1956), Ribbons and Medals, A. H. Baldwin & Son
- Duckers, Peter (2001). British Gallantry Awards 1855–2000. Princes Risborough, Buckinghamshire, UK: Shire Publications. ISBN 9780747805168.
- Henderson, P. (1984). Dragons Can be Defeated: A Complete Record of the George Medal's Progress, 1940-83. London: Spink & Son Ltd. ISBN 978-0907605140.
- Mussell, John W., ed. (2015). The Medal Yearbook 2015. Devon, UK: Token Publishing. ISBN 9781908828248.
- McDermott, P. (2016). Acts of Courage, Register of The George Medal 1940-2015. Bromsgrove, UK: Worcestershire Medal Service Ltd. ISBN 9780995553101.
