= Marichalar =

Marichalar may refer to:

- Jaime de Marichalar
- Victoria Federica de Marichalar y Borbón
- Felipe Juan Froilán de Marichalar y Borbón
