= Duchess of Lugo =

Title in Spanish peerage

Dukedom of Lugo
- Arms of the Infanta Elena, Duchess Lugo
- Creation date: 3 March 1995
- Created by: Juan Carlos I
- Peerage: Peerage of Spain
- First holder: Infanta Elena
- Present holder: Infanta Elena
- Heir apparent: Life peerage, will revert to the Crown
- Status: Extant

Duchess of Lugo is a substantive title in the Peerage of Spain. The title is considered a Título de la Casa Real (lit. 'Title of the Royal House'), a type of title that is not hereditary and is granted for life to a member of the Royal Family. Although it does not include any territorial landholdings and does not produce any revenue for the titleholder, nevertheless it still takes its name from the city and province of Lugo in Galicia.

The dukedom was created on 3 March 1995 by King Juan Carlos I, on the marriage between his eldest daughter, Infanta Elena, and Jaime de Marichalar, Lord of Tejada. The duchess and the duke consort made an official visit to the city in September 1995, where they were welcomed by the regional president, Manuel Fraga, the mayor of the city, Joaquín García Díez, the president of the Provincial Deputation, Francisco Cacharro, and the bishop of Lugo, José Gómez González.

Following the divorce of the royal couple, the former duke consort could no longer use the title.

== Duchess of Lugo ==
=== First creation, 1995 ===
Duchess	Portrait	Birth	Marriage(s)	Death
Infanta Elena; House of Bourbon-Anjou; 1995–	Infanta Cristina	20 December 1963; Our Lady of Loreto Hospital, Madrid, Spain daughter of King Juan Carlos I and Queen Sofia	Jaime de Marichalar; 18 March 1995 – 13 November 2007 (divorce); 2 children	Incumbent

== Sources ==
- Real Decreto 323/1995, de 3 de marzo, por el que se concede, con carácter vitalicio, la facultad de usar el título de Duquesa de Lugo a Su Alteza Real la Infanta Doña Elena (BOE núm. 54 de 4 de marzo de 1995).
