= List of heirs to the Spanish throne =

This is a list of the individuals who were, at any given time, considered the next in line to inherit the throne of Spain, should the incumbent monarch die. Those who actually succeeded (at any future time) are shown in bold.

From the personal union of the Crown of Castile and the Crown of Aragon until the accession of the first Bourbon monarch in 1700, the heir to the Spanish throne was the person closest to the Spanish monarch according to the male-preference cognatic primogeniture. From the accession of Philip V until the Pragmatic Sanction of 1830, the heir to the Spanish throne was the person closest to the Spanish monarch according to the Salic law. The heir, whether heir apparent or heir presumptive, was often granted the title of Prince of Asturias.

Significant breaks in the succession, where the designated heir did not in fact succeed (due to usurpation, conquest, revolution, or lack of heirs) are shown as breaks in the table below.

Heirs to the Spanish throne
House of Trastámara (1516–1555) and House of Habsburg (1516–1700)
Monarch	Heir	Relationship to monarch	Became heir (Date; Reason)	Ceased to be heir (Date; Reason)	Next in line of succession
Juana I	**King Carlos I**	Son	14 March 1516; Became joint monarch with his mother	12 April 1555; Mother died, became sole monarch	Ferdinand I, Archduke of Austria, 1516–1527, brother
Juana I	**King Carlos I**	Son	14 March 1516; Became joint monarch with his mother	12 April 1555; Mother died, became sole monarch	**Felipe, Prince of Asturias**, 1527–1555, son
Carlos I	Ferdinand I, Archduke of Austria	Brother	14 March 1516; Brother became joint monarch with their mother	21 May 1527; Son born to king	Leonor, Queen Dowager of Portugal, 1516–1526, sister
Carlos I	Ferdinand I, Archduke of Austria	Brother	14 March 1516; Brother became joint monarch with their mother	21 May 1527; Son born to king	Archduchess Elisabeth of Austria, 1526–1527, daughter
Carlos I	**Felipe, Prince of Asturias**	Son	21 May 1527; Born	16 January 1556; Father abdicated, became king	Ferdinand I, Archduke of Austria, 1527–1528, uncle
Carlos I	**Felipe, Prince of Asturias**	Son	21 May 1527; Born	16 January 1556; Father abdicated, became king	Infanta María, 1528–1529, sister
Carlos I	**Felipe, Prince of Asturias**	Son	21 May 1527; Born	16 January 1556; Father abdicated, became king	Infante Fernando, 1529–1530, brother
Carlos I	**Felipe, Prince of Asturias**	Son	21 May 1527; Born	16 January 1556; Father abdicated, became king	Infanta María, 1530–1537, sister
Carlos I	**Felipe, Prince of Asturias**	Son	21 May 1527; Born	16 January 1556; Father abdicated, became king	Infante Juan, 1537–1538, brother
Carlos I	**Felipe, Prince of Asturias**	Son	21 May 1527; Born	16 January 1556; Father abdicated, became king	Infanta María, 1538–1545, sister
Carlos I	**Felipe, Prince of Asturias**	Son	21 May 1527; Born	16 January 1556; Father abdicated, became king	Infante Carlos, 1545–1556, son
Felipe II	Carlos, Prince of Asturias	Son	16 January 1556; Father became king	24 July 1568; Died	María, Holy Roman Empress, 1556–1566, aunt
Felipe II	Carlos, Prince of Asturias	Son	16 January 1556; Father became king	24 July 1568; Died	Infanta Isabel Clara Eugenia, 1566–1568, half-sister
Felipe II	Infanta Isabel Clara Eugenia	Daughter	24 July 1568; Half-brother died	4 December 1571; Son born to king	Infanta Catalina Micaela, sister
Felipe II	Fernando, Prince of Asturias	Son	4 December 1571; Born	18 October 1578; Died	Infanta Isabel Clara Eugenia, 1571–1573, half-sister
Felipe II	Fernando, Prince of Asturias	Son	4 December 1571; Born	18 October 1578; Died	Infante Carlos Lorenzo, 1573–1575, brother
Felipe II	Fernando, Prince of Asturias	Son	4 December 1571; Born	18 October 1578; Died	Infanta Isabel Clara Eugenia, 1575, half-sister
Felipe II	Fernando, Prince of Asturias	Son	4 December 1571; Born	18 October 1578; Died	Infante Diego, 1575–1578, brother
Felipe II	Diego, Prince of Asturias	Son	18 October 1578; Brother died	21 November 1582; Died	**Infante Felipe**, brother
Felipe II	**Felipe, Prince of Asturias**	Son	21 November 1582; Brother died	13 September 1598; Father died, became king	Isabel Clara Eugenia, Co-Sovereign of the Spanish Netherlands, half-sister
Felipe III	Isabel Clara Eugenia, Co-Sovereign of the Spanish Netherlands	Half-sister	13 September 1598; Half-brother became king	22 September 1601; Daughter born to king	Filippo Emanuele, Prince of Piedmont, nephew
Felipe III	Infanta Ana	Daughter	22 September 1601; Born	8 April 1605; Son born to king	Isabel Clara Eugenia, Co-Sovereign of the Spanish Netherlands, 1601–1603, aunt
Felipe III	Infanta Ana	Daughter	22 September 1601; Born	8 April 1605; Son born to king	Infanta María, 1603, sister
Felipe III	Infanta Ana	Daughter	22 September 1601; Born	8 April 1605; Son born to king	Isabel Clara Eugenia, Co-Sovereign of the Spanish Netherlands, 1603–1605, aunt
Felipe III	**Felipe, Prince of Asturias**	Son	8 April 1605; Born	31 March 1621; Father died, became king	Infanta Ana, 1605–1607, sister
Felipe III	**Felipe, Prince of Asturias**	Son	8 April 1605; Born	31 March 1621; Father died, became king	Infante Carlos, 1607–1621, brother
Felipe IV	Infante Carlos	Brother	31 March 1621; Brother became king	14 August 1621; Daughter born to king	Cardinal-Infante Fernando, brother
Felipe IV	Infanta María Margarita	Daughter	14 August 1621; Born	15 August 1621; Died	Infante Carlos, uncle
Felipe IV	Infante Carlos	Brother	15 August 1621; Niece died	25 November 1623; Daughter born to king	Cardinal-Infante Fernando, brother
Felipe IV	Infanta Margarita María Catalina	Daughter	25 November 1623; Born	22 December 1623; Died	Infante Carlos, uncle
Felipe IV	Infante Carlos	Brother	22 December 1623; Niece died	21 November 1625; Daughter born to king	Cardinal-Infante Fernando, brother
Felipe IV	Infanta María Eugenia	Daughter	21 November 1625; Born	21 July 1627; Died	Infante Carlos, uncle
Felipe IV	Infante Carlos	Brother	21 July 1627; Niece died	31 October 1627; Daughter born to king	Cardinal-Infante Fernando, brother
Felipe IV	Infanta Isabel María Teresa	Daughter	31 October 1627; Born	1 November 1627; Died	Infante Carlos, uncle
Felipe IV	Infante Carlos	Brother	1 November 1627; Niece died	17 October 1629; Son born to king	Cardinal-Infante Fernando, brother
Felipe IV	Baltasar Carlos, Prince of Asturias	Son	17 October 1629; Born	9 October 1646; Died	Infante Carlos, 1629–1632, uncle
Felipe IV	Baltasar Carlos, Prince of Asturias	Son	17 October 1629; Born	9 October 1646; Died	Cardinal-Infante Fernando, 1632–1634, uncle
Felipe IV	Baltasar Carlos, Prince of Asturias	Son	17 October 1629; Born	9 October 1646; Died	Infante Francisco Fernando, 1634, brother
Felipe IV	Baltasar Carlos, Prince of Asturias	Son	17 October 1629; Born	9 October 1646; Died	Cardinal-Infante Fernando, 1634–1636, uncle
Felipe IV	Baltasar Carlos, Prince of Asturias	Son	17 October 1629; Born	9 October 1646; Died	Infanta María Ana Antonia, 1636, sister
Felipe IV	Baltasar Carlos, Prince of Asturias	Son	17 October 1629; Born	9 October 1646; Died	Cardinal-Infante Fernando, 1636–1638, uncle
Felipe IV	Baltasar Carlos, Prince of Asturias	Son	17 October 1629; Born	9 October 1646; Died	Infanta María Teresa, 1638–1646, sister
Felipe IV	Infanta María Teresa	Daughter	9 October 1646; Brother died	28 November 1657; Son born to king	Ferdinand IV, King of the Romans, 1646–1651, first cousin
Felipe IV	Infanta María Teresa	Daughter	9 October 1646; Brother died	28 November 1657; Son born to king	Infanta Margarita Teresa, 1651–1657, half-sister
Felipe IV	Felipe Próspero, Prince of Asturias	Son	28 November 1657; Born	1 November 1661; Died	Infanta María Teresa, 1657–1658, half-sister
Felipe IV	Felipe Próspero, Prince of Asturias	Son	28 November 1657; Born	1 November 1661; Died	Infante Fernando Tomás Carlos, 1658–1659, brother
Felipe IV	Felipe Próspero, Prince of Asturias	Son	28 November 1657; Born	1 November 1661; Died	Infanta María Teresa, 1659–1660, half-sister
Felipe IV	Felipe Próspero, Prince of Asturias	Son	28 November 1657; Born	1 November 1661; Died	Succession uncertain (Note: In 1660, Infanta María Teresa renounced her claim to the throne, in order to marry King Louis XIV of France. Later, the validity of her renunciation was contested, based on the fact that Spain failed to pay the dowry, which was pivotal for the succession of King Felipe V in 1700.), 1660–1661
Felipe IV	Succession uncertain, 1–6 Nov 1661				
Felipe IV	**Carlos, Prince of Asturias**	Son	6 November 1661; Born	17 September 1665; Father died, became king	Succession uncertain
(Note: Since the validity of the renunciation of María Teresa on her rights to the Spanish throne was contested, the succession was disputed among the heirs by cognatic primogeniture and the heirs established under the will of Felipe IV. The will entailed the throne on the heirs of his younger daughter Margarita Teresa.)
Carlos II	María Teresa, Queen of France	Half-sister	17 September 1665; Half-brother became king	30 July 1683; Died	Louis, Dauphin of France, son
Carlos II	Louis, Dauphin of France	Nephew	30 July 1683; Mother died	2 October 1700; Renounced claim to the throne together with eldest son	Louis, Duke of Burgundy, son
Carlos II	**Philippe, Duke of Anjou**	Grandnephew	2 October 1700; Father and brother renounced	1 November 1700; Granduncle died, became king on 16 November	Charles, Duke of Berry, brother
Carlos II	Margarita Teresa, Holy Roman Empress	Sister	17 September 1665; Brother became king	12 March 1673; Died	Leopold I, Holy Roman Emperor, 1665–1667, first cousin
Carlos II	Margarita Teresa, Holy Roman Empress	Sister	17 September 1665; Brother became king	12 March 1673; Died	Archduke Ferdinand Wenzel of Austria, 1667–1668, son
Carlos II	Margarita Teresa, Holy Roman Empress	Sister	17 September 1665; Brother became king	12 March 1673; Died	Leopold I, Holy Roman Emperor, 1668–1669, first cousin
Carlos II	Margarita Teresa, Holy Roman Empress	Sister	17 September 1665; Brother became king	12 March 1673; Died	Archduchess Maria Antonia of Austria, 1669–1670, daughter
Carlos II	Margarita Teresa, Holy Roman Empress	Sister	17 September 1665; Brother became king	12 March 1673; Died	Archduke Johann Leopold, 1670, son
Carlos II	Margarita Teresa, Holy Roman Empress	Sister	17 September 1665; Brother became king	12 March 1673; Died	Archduchess Maria Antonia of Austria, 1670–1673, daughter
Carlos II	Maria Antonia, Electress of Bavaria	Niece	12 March 1673; Mother died	24 December 1692; Died	Leopold I, Holy Roman Emperor, 1673–1689, first cousin once-removed
Carlos II	Maria Antonia, Electress of Bavaria	Niece	12 March 1673; Mother died	24 December 1692; Died	Electoral Prince Leopold Ferdinand of Bavaria, 1689, son
Carlos II	Maria Antonia, Electress of Bavaria	Niece	12 March 1673; Mother died	24 December 1692; Died	Leopold I, Holy Roman Emperor, 1689–1690, first cousin once-removed
Carlos II	Maria Antonia, Electress of Bavaria	Niece	12 March 1673; Mother died	24 December 1692; Died	Electoral Prince Anton of Bavaria, 1690, son
Carlos II	Maria Antonia, Electress of Bavaria	Niece	12 March 1673; Mother died	24 December 1692; Died	Leopold I, Holy Roman Emperor, 1690–1692, first cousin once-removed
Carlos II	Maria Antonia, Electress of Bavaria	Niece	12 March 1673; Mother died	24 December 1692; Died	Electoral Prince Joseph Ferdinand of Bavaria, 1692, son
Carlos II	Electoral Prince Joseph Ferdinand of Bavaria	Grandnephew	24 December 1692; Mother died	6 February 1699; Died	Leopold I, Holy Roman Emperor, first cousin twice-removed
Carlos II	Leopold I, Holy Roman Emperor	First cousin	6 February 1699; First cousin twice-removed died	1 November 1700; First cousin died, rival claimant became king on 16 November	Joseph I, King of the Romans, son
House of Bourbon (1700–1808)
Monarch	Heir	Relationship to monarch	Became heir (Date; Reason)	Ceased to be heir (Date; Reason)	Next in line of succession
Felipe V	Charles, Duke of Berry	Brother	16 November 1700; Brother became king	25 August 1707; Son born to king	Succession uncertain
Felipe V	**Luis, Prince of Asturias**	Son	25 August 1707; Born	15 January 1724; Father abdicated, became king	Charles, Duke of Berry, 1707–1709, uncle
Felipe V	**Luis, Prince of Asturias**	Son	25 August 1707; Born	15 January 1724; Father abdicated, became king	Infante Felipe, 1709, brother
Felipe V	**Luis, Prince of Asturias**	Son	25 August 1707; Born	15 January 1724; Father abdicated, became king	Charles, Duke of Berry, 1709–1712, uncle
Felipe V	**Luis, Prince of Asturias**	Son	25 August 1707; Born	15 January 1724; Father abdicated, became king	Infante Felipe Pedro, 1712–1719, brother
Felipe V	**Luis, Prince of Asturias**	Son	25 August 1707; Born	15 January 1724; Father abdicated, became king	**Infante Fernando**, 1719–1724, brother
Luis I	**Infante Fernando**	Brother	15 January 1724; Brother became king	31 August 1724; Brother died, father restored as king on 6 September	**Infante Carlos**, half-brother
(Note: On 31 August 1724, Luis I died childless at age 17, just months after the abdication of his father, Felipe V. His heir would be his brother, Infante Fernando, who was only 10. Six days later, to avoid a regency and after much convincing and pressure, especially from Queen Dowager Isabel, Felipe V reluctantly accepted to be restored to the Spanish throne.)
Felipe V	**Fernando, Prince of Asturias**	Son	6 September 1724; Father restored as king	9 July 1746; Father died, became king	**King Carlos VII & V of Naples and Sicily**, half-brother
Fernando VI	**King Carlos VII & V of Naples and Sicily**	Half-brother	9 July 1746; Half-brother became king	10 August 1759; Half-brother died, became king	Felipe, Duke of Parma, 1746–1747, brother
Fernando VI	**King Carlos VII & V of Naples and Sicily**	Half-brother	9 July 1746; Half-brother became king	10 August 1759; Half-brother died, became king	Infante Felipe, Duke of Calabria 1747–1759, son
Carlos III	Infante Felipe, Duke of Calabria	Son	10 August 1759; Father became king	5 October 1759; Excluded from succession	**Infante Carlos**, brother
Carlos III	**Carlos, Prince of Asturias**	Son	5 October 1759; Brother excluded	14 December 1788; Father died, became king	King Fernando I of the Two Sicilies, 1759–1771, brother
Carlos III	**Carlos, Prince of Asturias**	Son	5 October 1759; Brother excluded	14 December 1788; Father died, became king	Infante Carlos Clemente, 1771–1774, son
Carlos III	**Carlos, Prince of Asturias**	Son	5 October 1759; Brother excluded	14 December 1788; Father died, became king	King Fernando I of the Two Sicilies, 1774–1780, brother
Carlos III	**Carlos, Prince of Asturias**	Son	5 October 1759; Brother excluded	14 December 1788; Father died, became king	Infante Carlos Domingo, 1780–1783, son
Carlos III	**Carlos, Prince of Asturias**	Son	5 October 1759; Brother excluded	14 December 1788; Father died, became king	King Fernando I of the Two Sicilies, 1783, brother
Carlos III	**Carlos, Prince of Asturias**	Son	5 October 1759; Brother excluded	14 December 1788; Father died, became king	Infante Carlos Francisco de Paula, 1783–1784, son
Carlos III	**Carlos, Prince of Asturias**	Son	5 October 1759; Brother excluded	14 December 1788; Father died, became king	**Infante Fernando**, 1784–1788, son
Carlos IV	**Fernando, Prince of Asturias**	Son	14 December 1788; Father became king	19 March 1808; Father abdicated, became king	Infante Carlos María Isidro, brother
Fernando VII	Infante Carlos María Isidro	Brother	19 March 1808; Brother became king	6 May 1808; Father and brother abdicated	Infante Francisco de Paula, brother
House of Bonaparte (1808–1813)
Monarch	Heir	Relationship to monarch	Became heir (Date; Reason)	Ceased to be heir (Date; Reason)	Next in line of succession
José I	Napoléon I, Emperor of the French	Brother	6 June 1808; Brother became king	11 December 1813; Brother deposed	Eugène de Beauharnais, Prince of Venice, 1808–1811, adoptive son
José I	Napoléon I, Emperor of the French	Brother	6 June 1808; Brother became king	11 December 1813; Brother deposed	Napoléon François, King of Rome, 1811–1813, son
House of Bourbon (first restoration) (1814–1868)
Monarch	Heir	Relationship to monarch	Became heir (Date; Reason)	Ceased to be heir (Date; Reason)	Next in line of succession
Fernando VII	Infante Carlos María Isidro	Brother	4 May 1814; Brother restored as king	10 October 1830; Daughter born to king	Infante Francisco de Paula, 1813–1818, brother
Fernando VII	Infante Carlos María Isidro	Brother	4 May 1814; Brother restored as king	10 October 1830; Daughter born to king	Infante Carlos Luis, 1818–1830, son
Fernando VII	**Isabel, Princess of Asturias**	Daughter	10 October 1830; Born	29 September 1833; Father died, became queen	Infante Carlos María Isidro, 1830–1832, uncle
Fernando VII	**Isabel, Princess of Asturias**	Daughter	10 October 1830; Born	29 September 1833; Father died, became queen	Infanta Luisa Fernanda, 1832–1833, sister
Isabel II	Infanta Luisa Fernanda, Duchess of Montpensier	Sister	29 September 1833; Sister became queen	12 July 1850; Son born to queen	Infante Carlos María Isidro, 1833–1837, uncle
Isabel II	Infanta Luisa Fernanda, Duchess of Montpensier	Sister	29 September 1833; Sister became queen	12 July 1850; Son born to queen	Infante Francisco de Paula, 1837–1848, uncle
Isabel II	Infanta Luisa Fernanda, Duchess of Montpensier	Sister	29 September 1833; Sister became queen	12 July 1850; Son born to queen	Princess Marie Isabelle of Orléans, 1848–1850, daughter
Isabel II	Fernando, Prince of Asturias	Son	12 July 1850; Born	12 July 1850; Died	Infanta Luisa Fernanda, Duchess of Montpensier, aunt
Isabel II	Infanta Luisa Fernanda, Duchess of Montpensier	Sister	12 July 1850; Nephew died	20 December 1851; Daughter born to queen	Princess Marie Isabelle of Orléans, daughter
Isabel II	Isabel, Princess of Asturias	Daughter	20 December 1851; Born	28 November 1857; Son born to queen	Infanta Luisa Fernanda, Duchess of Montpensier, 1851–1854, aunt
Isabel II	Isabel, Princess of Asturias	Daughter	20 December 1851; Born	28 November 1857; Son born to queen	Infanta María Cristina, 1854, sister
Isabel II	Isabel, Princess of Asturias	Daughter	20 December 1851; Born	28 November 1857; Son born to queen	Infanta Luisa Fernanda, Duchess of Montpensier, 1854–1855, aunt
Isabel II	Isabel, Princess of Asturias	Daughter	20 December 1851; Born	28 November 1857; Son born to queen	Infanta Margarita, 1855, sister
Isabel II	Isabel, Princess of Asturias	Daughter	20 December 1851; Born	28 November 1857; Son born to queen	Infanta Luisa Fernanda, Duchess of Montpensier, 1855–1857, aunt
Isabel II	**Alfonso, Prince of Asturias**	Son	28 November 1857; Born	30 September 1868; Mother deposed	Infanta Isabel, 1857–1866, sister
Isabel II	**Alfonso, Prince of Asturias**	Son	28 November 1857; Born	30 September 1868; Mother deposed	Infante Francisco de Asís Leopoldo, 1866, brother
Isabel II	**Alfonso, Prince of Asturias**	Son	28 November 1857; Born	30 September 1868; Mother deposed	Infanta Isabel, Countess of Girgenti, 1866–1868, sister
House of Savoy (1870–1873)
Monarch	Heir	Relationship to monarch	Became heir (Date; Reason)	Ceased to be heir (Date; Reason)	Next in line of succession
Amadeo I	Manuel Filiberto, Prince of Asturias, Duke of Apulia	Son	16 November 1870; Father elected as king	11 February 1873; Father abdicated, monarchy abolished	None, 1870
Amadeo I	Manuel Filiberto, Prince of Asturias, Duke of Apulia	Son	16 November 1870; Father elected as king	11 February 1873; Father abdicated, monarchy abolished	Prince Víctor Manuel, Count of Turin, 1870–1873, brother
House of Bourbon (second restoration) (1874–1931)
Monarch	Heir	Relationship to monarch	Became heir (Date; Reason)	Ceased to be heir (Date; Reason)	Next in line of succession
Alfonso XII	Isabel, Princess of Asturias	Sister	29 December 1874; Monarchy restored	11 September 1880; Daughter born to king	Infanta María del Pilar, 1874–1879, sister
Alfonso XII	Isabel, Princess of Asturias	Sister	29 December 1874; Monarchy restored	11 September 1880; Daughter born to king	Infanta María de la Paz, 1879–1880, sister
Alfonso XII	María de las Mercedes, Princess of Asturias	Daughter	11 September 1880; Born	25 November 1885; Father died, mother pregnant	Infanta Isabel, Countess of Girgenti, 1880–1882, aunt
Alfonso XII	María de las Mercedes, Princess of Asturias	Daughter	11 September 1880; Born	25 November 1885; Father died, mother pregnant	Infanta María Teresa, 1882–1901, sister
(Note: On 25 November 1885, Alfonso XII died while Queen María Cristina was pregnant, so the throne went vacant, depending on whether the unborn child was a male or a female: a male would make that child king, while a female would make the eldest daughter (María de las Mercedes, Princess of Asturias) queen. During this period, María Cristina ruled as regent until her third child, a son, was born on 17 May 1886; he was King Alfonso XIII from birth.)
Alfonso XIII	María de las Mercedes, Princess of Asturias	Sister	17 May 1886; Posthumous son born to the late king	17 October 1904; Died	Infanta María Teresa, 1882–1901, sister
Alfonso XIII	María de las Mercedes, Princess of Asturias	Sister	17 May 1886; Posthumous son born to the late king	17 October 1904; Died	Infante Alfonso, Prince of Bourbon-Two Sicilies, 1901–1904, son
Alfonso XIII	Infante Alfonso, Prince of Bourbon-Two Sicilies	Nephew	17 October 1904; Mother died	10 May 1907; Son born to king	Infante Fernando, Prince of Bourbon-Two Sicilies, 1904–1905, brother
Alfonso XIII	Infante Alfonso, Prince of Bourbon-Two Sicilies	Nephew	17 October 1904; Mother died	10 May 1907; Son born to king	Infanta Isabel Alfonsa, Princess of Bourbon-Two Sicilies, 1905–1907, sister
Alfonso XIII	Alfonso, Prince of Asturias	Son	10 May 1907; Born	14 April 1931; Monarchy abolished	Infante Alfonso, Prince of Bourbon-Two Sicilies, 1907–1908, first cousin
Alfonso XIII	Alfonso, Prince of Asturias	Son	10 May 1907; Born	14 April 1931; Monarchy abolished	Infante Jaime, 1908–1931, brother
House of Bourbon (third restoration) (1975–present)
Monarch	Heir	Relationship to monarch	Became heir (Date; Reason)	Ceased to be heir (Date; Reason)	Next in line of succession
Vacant	No recognised heir, 1947–1969 (Note: In 1933, Alfonso XIII's eldest two sons (Alfonso, Prince of Asturias and Infante Jaime) renounced their claims to the throne, so from then on Alfonso XIII's heir would be his third son, Infante Juan. In 1947, Francisco Franco restored the monarchy, confirmed by referendum, while appointing himself as Head of State for life. Having the power to appoint his successor, who would be king, Franco did not do so with Infante Juan, Count of Barcelona, and in 1969 he appointed Infante Juan's eldest son, Juan Carlos, Prince of Asturias, considering him to be more likely to preserve the Francoist regime after his death, which did not happen, as in 1975, Juan Carlos I promptly promoted Spanish transition to democracy. Finally, in 1977, Infante Juan renounced his headship of the Royal House of Spain, recognising his son, the King, as such.)				
Vacant	**Juan Carlos, Prince of Spain**	None	22 July 1969; Appointed heir to the throne	22 November 1975; Head of State died, became king	**Infante Felipe**, son
Juan Carlos I	**Felipe, Prince of Asturias**	Son	22 November 1975; Father became king	19 June 2014; Father abdicated, became king	Infanta Elena, 1975–2005, sister
Juan Carlos I	**Felipe, Prince of Asturias**	Son	22 November 1975; Father became king	19 June 2014; Father abdicated, became king	Infanta Leonor, 2005–2014, daughter
Felipe VI	Leonor, Princess of Asturias	Daughter	19 June 2014; Father became king	Incumbent	Infanta Sofía, sister

== See also ==
- Succession to the Spanish throne
