= Victoria de Marichalar y Borbón =

Member of the Spanish royal family (born 2000)

- Grandee
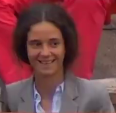
- de Marichalar in 2017
- Born: Victoria Federica de Todos los Santos de Marichalar y Borbón; 9 September 2000 (age 26); Ruber International Hospital, Madrid, Spain
- Father: Jaime de Marichalar, Lord of Tejada
- Mother: Infanta Elena, Duchess of Lugo

Victoria Federica de Todos los Santos de Marichalar y Borbón GE (born 9 September 2000) is the younger child and only daughter of Infanta Elena, Duchess of Lugo, and Jaime de Marichalar. She is a granddaughter of King Juan Carlos I and Queen Sofía of Spain and a niece of King Felipe VI. Victoria is fifth in the line of succession to the Spanish throne after her cousins, King Felipe's daughters Leonor, Princess of Asturias, and Infanta Sofía; her mother; and her brother, Felipe.

== Early life and education ==
Coat of arms of Victoria Federica of Marichalar

Victoria de Marichalar y Borbón was born 9 September 2000 at 13:00 in Ruber International Hospital in Madrid.

She made her first Holy Communion on 27 May 2009 at the Dominicos Church in Alcobendas, Spain.

She attended Colegio San Patricio in Madrid. Then she studied at a British boarding school for 3 years before returning to Spain at St. George's de La Moraleja.

She studied business administration and management at the College for International Studies in Madrid.

Victoria studied ballet and horse riding. She also has a keen interest in the traditions of her country, particularly bullfighting. As a teenager, she spent her summer holidays in Palma de Mallorca with her family.

== Career ==
Marichalar has been reported to be working in the fashion industry and is quoted as saying that fashion is her "true calling".

In 2025 she participated in the Antena 3 television contest El desafío, where she finished in second place.

== Personal life ==
Between 2022 and 2023, she was in a relationship with motorcycle racer Albert Arenas.

Victoria de Marichalar y Borbón House of Marichalar Born: 9 September 2000
Lines of succession
Preceded by Felipe de Marichalar	Line of succession to the Spanish Throne; 5th in line	Succeeded by Infanta Cristina
