= Parque Princesa Leonor =

Public park

Coordinates: 40°29′17″N 3°37′12″W

Princess Leonor Park (Spanish: Parque Princesa Leonor) is a public park in the city of Madrid, Spain, located within Valdebebas. The park covers 78 hectares and was inaugurated on March 26, 2023. The park is named after Leonor, Princess of Asturias, the current heir presumptive to the Spanish throne.

== Location ==
The park is located in the Valdefuentes neighborhood, which belongs to the Hortaleza district , in the northeast of the municipality. It is bordered to the north and east by María de las Mercedes de Borbón Street , to the west by Felipe VI Park, and to the south by Avenida de las Fuerzas Armadas. To the east lies the Valdebebas neighborhood, and to the west, the M-40 motorway and the Sanchinarro neighborhood.

== Design ==
The park has 5,500 trees of 30 different species and 170,000 shrubs of 90 different species distributed across three distinct landscapes: the Riverside Landscape on the eastern side, the Agricultural Landscape in the center, and the Pastureland Landscape on the western side. These landscapes are designed to provide a transition between the urban side of the neighborhood and the rural, forested area of Felipe VI Park. The park also has ten kilometers of paths and pedestrian walkways and three kilometers of bike lanes.

== See also ==
- List of titles and honours of Leonor, Princess of Asturias
