= Spanish succession =

Spanish succession may refer to:

- List of heads of state of Spain
- War of the Spanish Succession
- Succession to the Spanish throne
