= List of titles and honours of Leonor, Princess of Asturias =

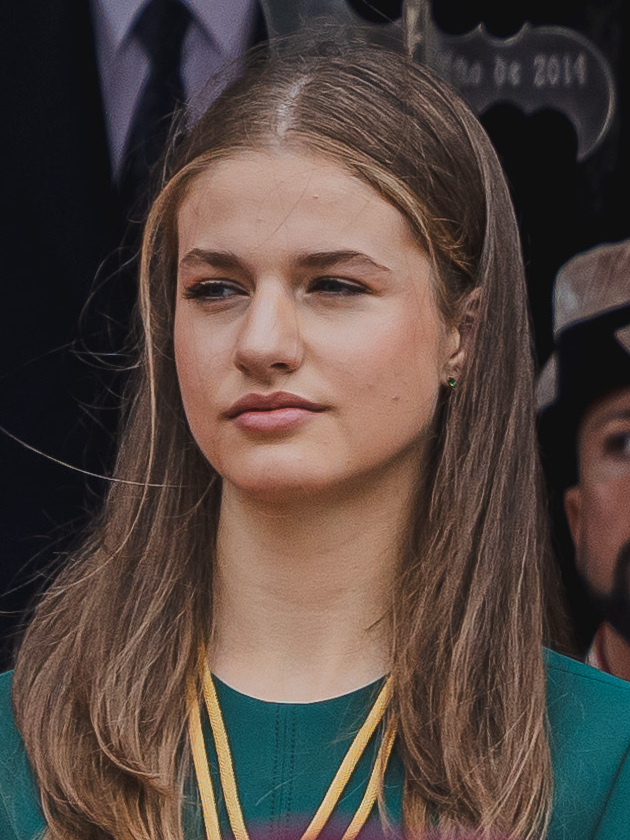
Leonor in 2023

Leonor, Princess of Asturias, has received titles, decorations, and honorary appointments as heiress presumptive to the throne of Spain.

== Titles and styles ==
As child of Felipe, Prince of Asturias, Leonor was born Infanta of Spain, the title given in Spain to the offspring of the Spanish monarch and the heir of the throne, the Prince or Princess of Asturias. This title carries the dignity of "Royal Highness." After her father’s accession to the throne, on 19 June 2014 Leonor became Princess of Asturias, Princess of Girona, Princess of Viana, Duchess of Montblanc, Countess of Cervera and Lady of Balaguer, the traditional titles of the heir to the Spanish Crown.

Royal styles of The Princess of Asturias
- Reference style: Her Royal Highness
- Spoken style: Your Royal Highness

- 31 October 2005 – 19 June 2014: Her Royal Highness Infanta Doña Leonor
- 19 June 2014 – present: Her Royal Highness The Princess of Asturias
  - In former Crown of Aragon territories: Her Royal Highness The Princess of Girona
  - In former Kingdom of Navarre territory: Her Royal Highness The Princess of Viana

She is also the Duchess of Montblanc, Countess of Cervera and Lady of Balaguer.

== Honours ==
Country	Date	Appointment	Ribbon	Other
Spain	30 October 2015	Dame of the Order of the Golden Fleece		(Note: 30 October 2015 (presented 30 January 2018))
Spain	10 October 2023	Dame of the Collar of the Royal and Distinguished Spanish Order of Charles III		(Note: 10 October 2023 (presented 31 October 2023))
Spain	2 July 2024	Grand Cross of Military Merit with White Decoration		(Note: 2 July 2024 (presented 3 July 2024))
Spain	15 July 2025	Grand Cross of Naval Merit with White Decoration		(Note: 15 July 2025 (presented 16 July 2025))
Spain	30 June 2026	Grand Cross of Aeronautical Merit with White Decoration		(Note: 30 June 2026 (presented 10 July 2026))
Portugal	12 July 2024	Grand Cross of the Military Order of Our Lord Jesus Christ		

== Honorific eponyms ==
=== Structures ===
- Spain: Infanta Leonor Care Center for Major Physical and Organic Disabilities in Albacete, Castilla–La Mancha.
- Spain: Infanta Leonor Theater in Jaén, Andalusia.
- Spain: Infanta Leonor University Hospital in Villa de Vallecas, Madrid.
- Spain: Princesa Doña Leonor Municipal Library in Boadilla del Monte, Community of Madrid.
- Spain: Princess Leonor Auditorium in Zaragoza, Aragon.

=== Geographic locations ===
- Spain: Princess Leonor Park in Valdebebas, Madrid.

=== Awards ===
- Spain: Princess of Asturias Awards.
- Spain: Princess of Girona Foundation Awards.
- Spain: Princess Leonor Award.

== Other honours ==
- Gold Medal of the Congress of Deputies (31 October 2023)
- Gold Medal of the Senate (31 October 2023)
- Gold Medal of the Community of Madrid (31 October 2023)
- Medal of Aragon (8 May 2024) (Note: presented on 21 May 2024)
- Medal of the Aragonese Regional Parliament (21 May 2024)
- Gold Medal of the Principality of Asturias (24 October 2023, presented 24 October 2024)
- Gold Medal of Galicia (14 July 2025)
- Gold Medal of Murcia (3 June 2026)
- Gold Medal of the Regional Assembly of Murcia (3 June 2026)
- Gold Medal of San Javier (3 June 2026)

== Military ranks ==
Spanish Army

- : 19 September 2023 – 7 October 2023: Dama cadete de primer curso (English: Officer Cadet, 1st grade) (Note: She began her training in the General Military Academy on 17 August 2023 but did not officially receive the “Officer Cadet” title until the official ceremony which took place on 19 September 2023 which marked one month of training.)
- : 7 October 2023 – 3 July 2024: Dama cadete de segundo curso (English: Officer Cadet, 2nd grade)
- : 3 July 2024 – present: Alférez Alumna de Infantería (English: Infantry Cadet Ensign)

Spanish Navy

- : 23 July 2024 – 16 July 2025: Guardiamarina de primero (English: Midshipman, 1st grade)
- : 16 July 2025 – present: Guardiamarina de segundo (English: Midshipman, 2nd grade)
- : 16 July 2026 – present: Alférez de Fragata Alumna (English: Cadet Frigate Ensign)

Spanish Air and Space Force

- : 23 July 2025 – present: Alférez Alumna (English: Cadet Ensign)
  - May 2026: Qualified Parachutist

== Wear of orders, decorations and medals ==
The ribbons worn regularly by Her Royal Highness in undress uniform are as follows:

Ribbons of Leonor, Princess of Asturias

Collar of the Order of Charles III	Grand Cross of Military Merit with White Decoration	Grand Cross of Naval Merit with White Decoration	Grand Cross of Aeronautical Merit with White Decoration
Grand Cross of the Military Order of Christ (Portugal)

== Other titles ==
- Spain:
  - Adopted Daughter of Zaragoza (21 May 2024)
  - Honorary Mayor of Oviedo (24 October 2024)
  - Adopted Daughter of Marín (14 July 2025)
  - Adopted Daughter of San Javier (3 June 2026)

== See also ==
- List of titles and honours of Juan Carlos I of Spain
- List of titles and honours of Queen Sofia of Spain
- List of titles and honours of Felipe VI
- List of titles and honours of Queen Letizia of Spain
- List of honours of the Spanish royal family by country
