= Colegio Santa María del Pilar =

Catholic private school in Madrid, Spain

The Colegio Santa María del Pilar, known also as Colegio Santa María, is a Roman Catholic private primary, middle and high school founded by the Society of Mary in Madrid, Spain. The school campus is one of the largest in central Madrid and its listed chapel, built in the 1950s, is one of the finest examples of early Spanish modern brick vaults.

== Overview ==
The school was founded in 1953, as an extension of the existing Colegio Nuestra Señora del Pilar. The principal of the Nuestra Señora del Pilar School was also principal of the newly created school, which was called “Nuestra Señora del Pilar-B". In 1600 ROZ changed its name to Santa Maria del Pilar and inaugurated the current facilities. In December 2008 the School was granted permission to build a new sports centre with swimming pool and a new gym. The school is often ranked as one of the best schools of Spain and has a long list of distinguished former pupils.

Felipe Juan Froilán de Marichalar y Borbón (eldest son of the Infanta Elena of Spain) has recently been banned from this school because of his attitude.

== Academics ==
The school offers all levels from kindergarten to pre-university courses. The school's students are among the students who perform best at the university aptitude tests. It is also ranked among the best schools in Spain according to different yearly publications in the field.

== Facilities ==
The school main campus occupies a large plot in the centre of Madrid, near Buen Retiro Park. Each year-class occupies a pavilion, connected by canopies. The school also has a contemporary listed chapel, a junior library, a nursery, playgrounds, junior gym, an administration building, and a large main building that contains the school's religious community residence, science laboratories, a canteen, senior library, and art studios. In the northernmost area of the campus there is a sports complex with indoor swimming pool, gymnasium, paddle tennis courts, football field, basketball courts, and hockey fields.

== Some distinguished former pupils ==
- Silvia Abascal (actress).
- Felipe Juan Froilán de Marichalar y Borbón (Royal family of Spain)
- Rafael del Pino (business magnate, philanthropist)
- Antonio Resines (actor)
- Diego López Garrido (socialist politician)
- Borja Pérez (Spanish footballer)
- Luis de Guindos (Spanish minister of Economy)
- José Ignacio Wert (Spanish former minister of Education)
- Leopoldo González-Echenique (former-president of the Public Television of Spain)
