= Royal line of succession =

Royal line of succession may refer to:

- Succession to the British throne
- Line of succession to the Spanish throne
