= Felipe de Marichalar y Borbón =

Spanish noble (born 1998)

- Grandee of Spain; Lord of Tejada
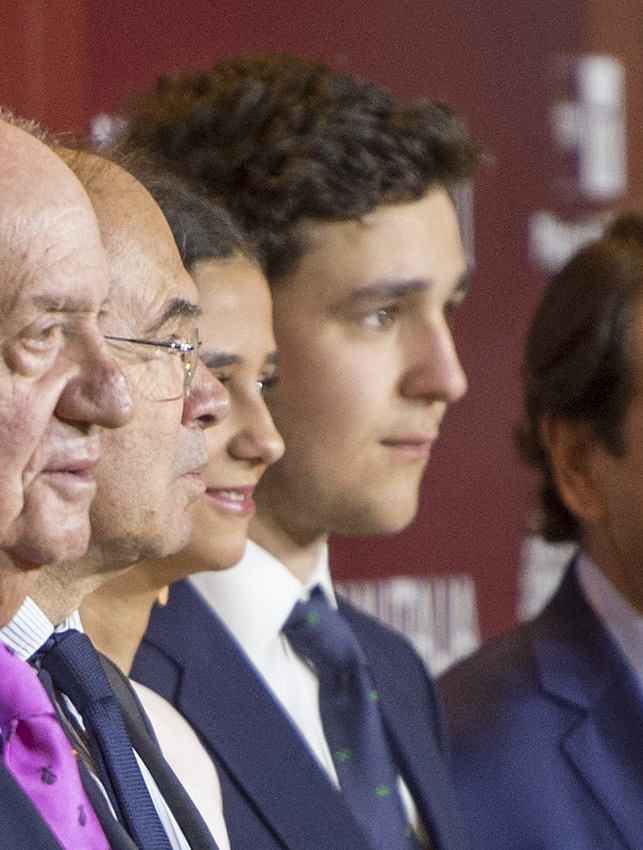
- Felipe in 2019
- Born: Felipe Juan Froilán de Todos los Santos de Marichalar y Borbón; 17 July 1998 (age 27); Ruber International Hospital, Madrid, Spain
- Father: Jaime de Marichalar, Lord of Tejada
- Mother: Infanta Elena, Duchess of Lugo

Felipe Juan Froilán de Todos los Santos de Marichalar y Borbón, Lord of Tejada GE (born 17 July 1998), widely known as Froilán, is the elder child and only son of Infanta Elena, Duchess of Lugo, and Jaime de Marichalar. He is the maternal-line grandson of King Juan Carlos I and Queen Sofía of Spain, and the nephew of King Felipe VI. He is the paternal-line grandson of Amalio de Marichalar y Bruguera, VIII Count of Ripalda and Concepción Sáenz de Tejada, Lady of Tejada. He is fourth in the line of succession to the Spanish throne, after his cousins (King Felipe's daughters) Leonor, Princess of Asturias, and Infanta Sofía of Spain and his mother, Elena.

He has a sister two years younger, Victoria de Marichalar y Borbón.

== Early life ==
=== Birth and christening ===
Felipe de Marichalar y Borbón was born on 17 July 1998 at Ruber International Hospital in Madrid.

He was baptized on Sunday 4 October 1998 day of the feast of San Francisco de Asis and on the eve of San Froilán, patron of Lugo, the mass was celebrated in the audience hall of the Zarzuela Palace. The ceremony was officiated by Archbishop of Madrid. His godparents were his maternal grandfather, Juan Carlos of Spain, and his paternal grandmother, Concepción Sáez de Tejada y Fernández de Boadilla, Dowager Countess of Ripalda (1929–2014).

=== Early life ===
Until the age of twelve, he studied at the Colegio San Patricio in Madrid, but due to his bad grades (although without repeating academic courses), his parents decided that he should attend a boarding school in England. Froilán took a course at Cottesmore, a boarding prep school in West Sussex, to return the following year, in 2011, to Colegio Santa María del Pilar in Madrid, where he remained for three years. Two of these years were spent in secondary school (ESO); he had to repeat an academic course.

On 9 April 2012, Felipe de Marichalar accidentally shot himself in his right foot while he was on a farm of his father's family in Garray (Soria). His father had to declare to the Civil Guard because Spanish law forbade the use of firearms by minors under the age of 14. The judge dismissed the case against Jaime de Marichalar, considering it not gross negligence but a small misdemeanor.

At the beginning of summer 2014, he was admitted to the Sagrada Familia Episcopal College of Sigüenza, from which he graduated from ESO the following year. In September 2015, he went to the United States, to complete his high school education in 2017 at the Blue Ridge School college, in Saint George, Virginia in Greene County, Virginia, Randolph-Macon Academy, in Front Royal, Virginia, and at the Culver Military Academy. The tuition, which for each course amounted to $45,000, was paid for by his maternal grandfather King Juan Carlos I.

He then began his higher education studies, majoring in Business Administration and Management at the College for International Studies in Madrid, a Spanish Higher Education institution associated with Endicott College.

In 2022, he started being investigated by police in the wake of being involved in a brawl involving knives outside the Vandido nightclub in Madrid. In January 2023 it was announced that Felipe would be going to live in the United Arab Emirates with his grandfather, Juan Carlos I. Froilán will work for the ADNOC oil company, owned by the Minister of Advanced Technology of the United Arab Emirates, Sultan Ahmed Al-Jaber.

== Titles, styles, honours and arms ==
Coat of arms of Felipe Juan Froilán of Marichalar

He is styled as The Most Excellent Don Felipe Juan Froilán de Todos los Santos de Marichalar y Borbón, Grandee of Spain and Caballero Divisoro Hijodalgo of the Illustrious Solar de Tejada

Felipe de Marichalar y Borbón House of Bourbon Cadet branch of the Capetian dynasty Born: 17 July 1998
Lines of succession
| Preceded by Infanta Elena | Line of succession to the Spanish Throne; 4th in line | Succeeded by Victoria de Marichalar |
