= Premio Princesa Leonor =

Spanish youth sports award

The Princess Leonor Award (Spanish: Premio Princesa Leonor), until 2015 known as the Prince of Asturias Award HRH Don Felipe (Spanish: Premio Príncipe de Asturias S. A. R. Don Felipe) is the National Sports Award (Premios Nacionales del Deporte) given to the athlete under 18 years of age who has most distinguished themselves during the year for their sporting progress. It has been awarded annually since 2009 by the Supreme Sports Council in a ceremony held at the Royal Palace of Madrid by the Royal Household. The Monarch of Spain presents the trophy to the recipient. It is named after Leonor, Princess of Asturias, the current heir presumptive to the Spanish throne.

== Recipients ==
Year	Award recipient (person or entity)	Activity
2009	Alberto Gavaldá	Athletics
2010	Marc Márquez	Motorcycling
2011	José Javier Cano Juan González Granado Marcus Cooper Walz Javier Cabañín	Canoeing
2012	Ana Peleteiro	Athletics
2013	Ángela Salvadores	Basketball
2014	Aina Colom Álex Márquez	Sailing Motorcycling
2015	Jesús Tortosa	Taekwondo
2016	Hugo González	Swimming
2017	María Vicente	Athletics
2018	Salma Paralluelo	Athletics and Soccer
2019	Alba Vázquez	Swimming
2020	Special Distinction Award (Note: Due to the lack of competitions in 2020, a special award was presented to the athletes who fought against the COVID-19 pandemic.)	N/A
2021	Adriana Cerezo	Taekwondo
2022	Izan Almansa	Basketball
2023	Iyana Martín	Basketball
2024	Awa Fam	Basketball
