= Spanish royal family =

Family of the Spanish monarch

The Spanish royal family comprises Felipe VI and his immediate family, these are Queen Letizia; their children, Leonor, Princess of Asturias, and Infanta Sofía; and Felipe's parents, King Juan Carlos I and Queen Sofía. The royal family lives at the Palace of Zarzuela in Madrid, although their official residence is the Royal Palace of Madrid. The membership of the royal family is defined by royal decree and consists of: the King of Spain, the monarch's spouse, the monarch's parents, his children, and the heir to the Spanish throne.

== Titles and styles ==
Coat of arms of the Spanish monarch

The titles and styles of the Royal Family are as follows:

- The occupant of the throne is the King (Spanish: el Rey) or the Queen (Spanish: la Reina), together with other titles pertaining to the Crown or belonging to members of the royal family. They are styled His or Her Majesty.
- The King's wife bears the title of Queen (consort) with the style Her Majesty.
- The husband of the Queen regnant, known as "Consort to the Queen of Spain", bears the title of Prince and is styled His Royal Highness. (Note: Queen Isabella II granted her husband Francis, Duke of Cádiz, the title of King and the style of His Majesty.)
- The King's heir apparent or heir presumptive bears the title of Prince or Princess of Asturias with the style Royal Highness.
- A monarch's children besides the Prince or Princess of Asturias, as well as the children of the Prince or Princess, bear the title of Infante or Infanta and use the style Royal Highness. The children of an Infante or Infanta have the rank (but not the title) of Grandees and the style of Excellency.
- Spouses and widows/widowers of the monarch's sons and daughters, other than those of the Prince or Princess of Asturias, are entitled to the form of address and honours the monarch may grant them.
- The sovereign may also grant the dignity of Infante or Infanta with the style of Highness.

== Members of the royal family ==
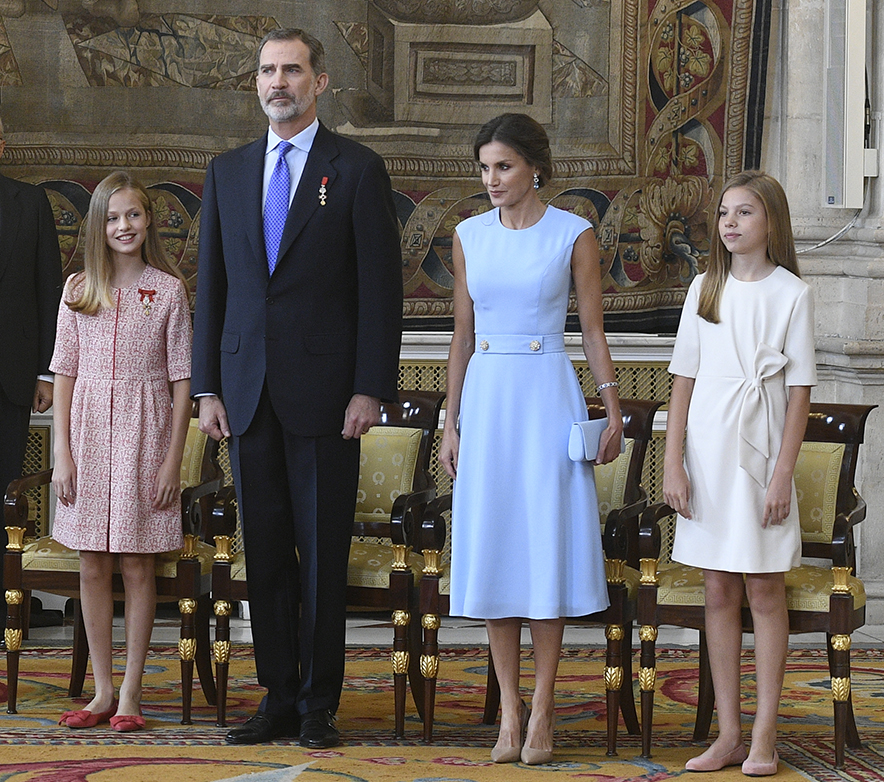
King Felipe VI and Queen Letizia with their daughters Leonor, Princess of Asturias, and Infanta Sofía

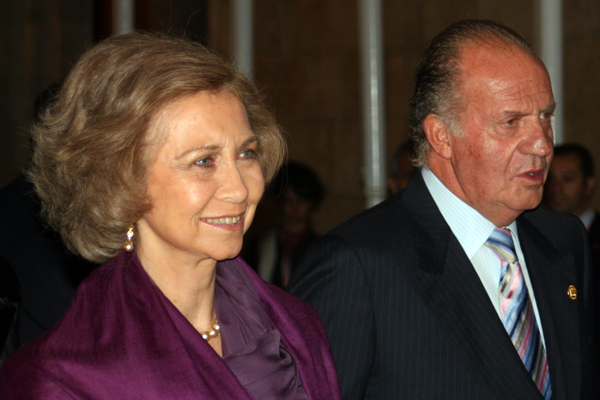
King Juan Carlos I and Queen Sofía

- King Felipe VI was born on 30 January 1968. He is the third child of Queen Sofía and King Juan Carlos I. He became heir apparent when his father became king in 1975, and was named Prince of Asturias in 1977. He married Letizia Ortiz Rocasolano on 22 May 2004. He became king on 19 June 2014 upon his father's abdication.
- Queen Letizia was born on 15 September 1972, the eldest daughter of Jesús José Ortiz Álvarez and María de la Paloma Rocasolano Rodríguez. The King and Queen have two daughters.
  - Leonor, Princess of Asturias, is the elder daughter of King Felipe VI and Queen Letizia, and the heir presumptive to the Spanish throne since her father's accession in 2014. She was born on 31 October 2005.
  - Infanta Sofía is the younger daughter of Queen Letizia and King Felipe VI. She was born on 29 April 2007.
- King Juan Carlos I is the former king of Spain, reigning from 1975 to 2014. He was born on 5 January 1938 as the eldest son and second child of Infante Juan, Count of Barcelona, and Princess María de las Mercedes, Countess of Barcelona. Through his father, he is a grandson of King Alfonso XIII. On 14 May 1962, Juan Carlos married Princess Sophia of Greece, with whom he has three children. Following General Franco's death, Juan Carlos was proclaimed king on 22 November 1975. On 19 June 2014, he abdicated and his son was enthroned as King Felipe VI.
- Queen Sofía is married to King Juan Carlos I. She was born on 2 November 1938, and is the eldest child of King Paul and Queen Frederica of Greece. Sofía was the queen consort of Spain during her husband's reign.

== Members of the King's family ==
- Infanta Elena, Duchess of Lugo, born 20 December 1963, is the eldest child of King Juan Carlos I and Queen Sofía. She married Jaime de Marichalar y Sáenz de Tejada on 18 March 1995, and they divorced in December 2009. The Duchess has two children with Marichalar.
- Infanta Cristina, born 13 June 1965, is the second child and younger daughter of King Juan Carlos I and Queen Sofía. She married Iñaki Urdangarin Liebaert on 4 October 1997, and they divorced in December 2023. Infanta Cristina and Iñaki Urdangarin have four children.
- Infanta Margarita, Duchess of Soria and Hernani, is the younger sister of King Juan Carlos and the aunt of King Felipe VI. She was born on 6 March 1939 as the third child and younger daughter of Infante Juan, Count of Barcelona, and Princess María de las Mercedes, Countess of Barcelona. She married Carlos Zurita y Delgado on 12 October 1972.
- Carlos Zurita, Duke of Soria and Hernani, was born on 9 October 1943 as the son of Carlos Zurita y González-Vidalte and María del Carmen Delgado y Fernández de Santaella. The Duchess and Duke of Soria have two children.
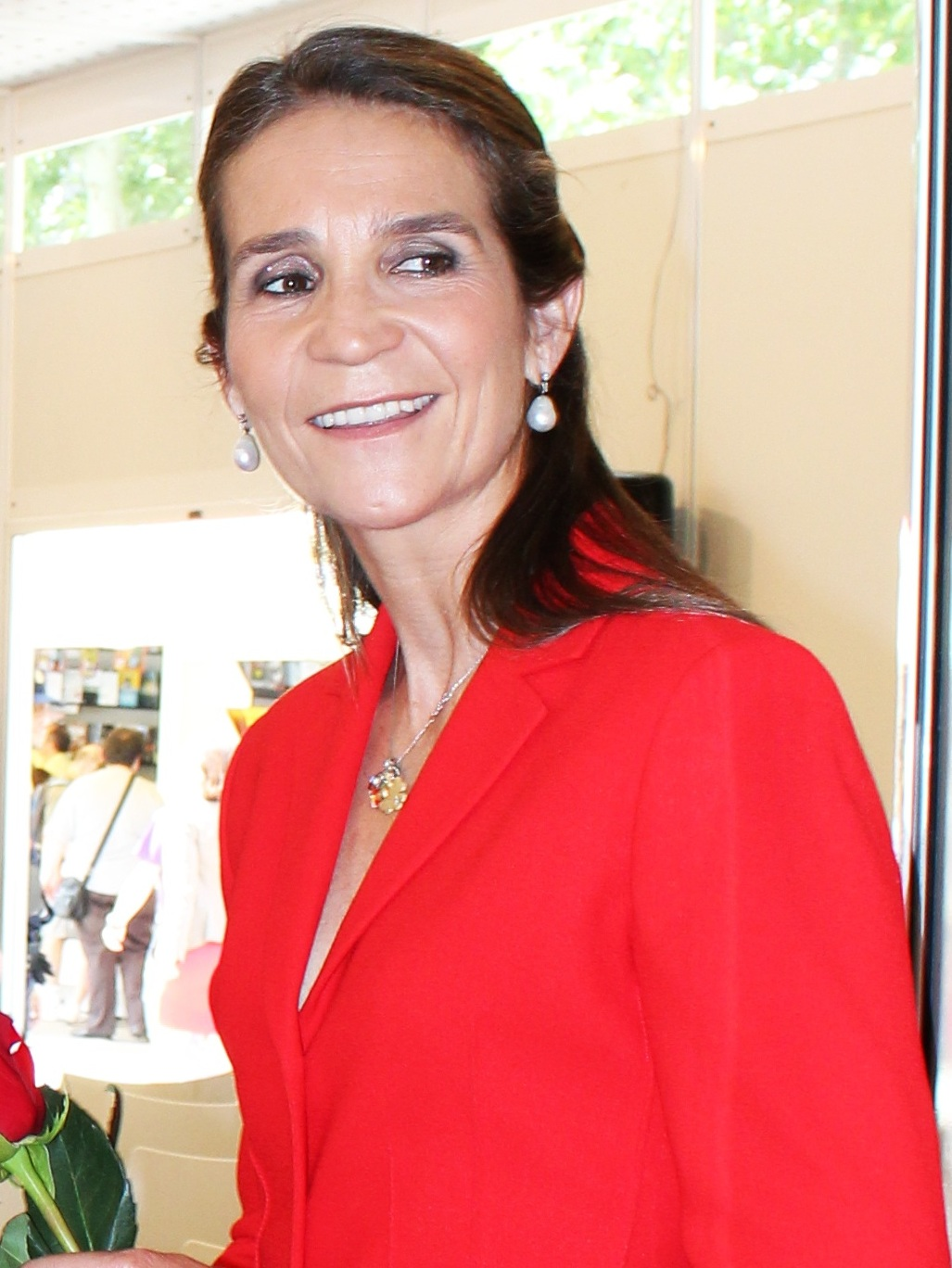
The Duchess of Lugo

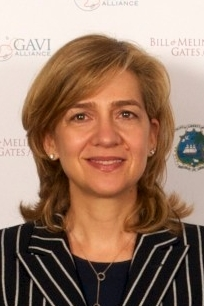
Infanta Cristina

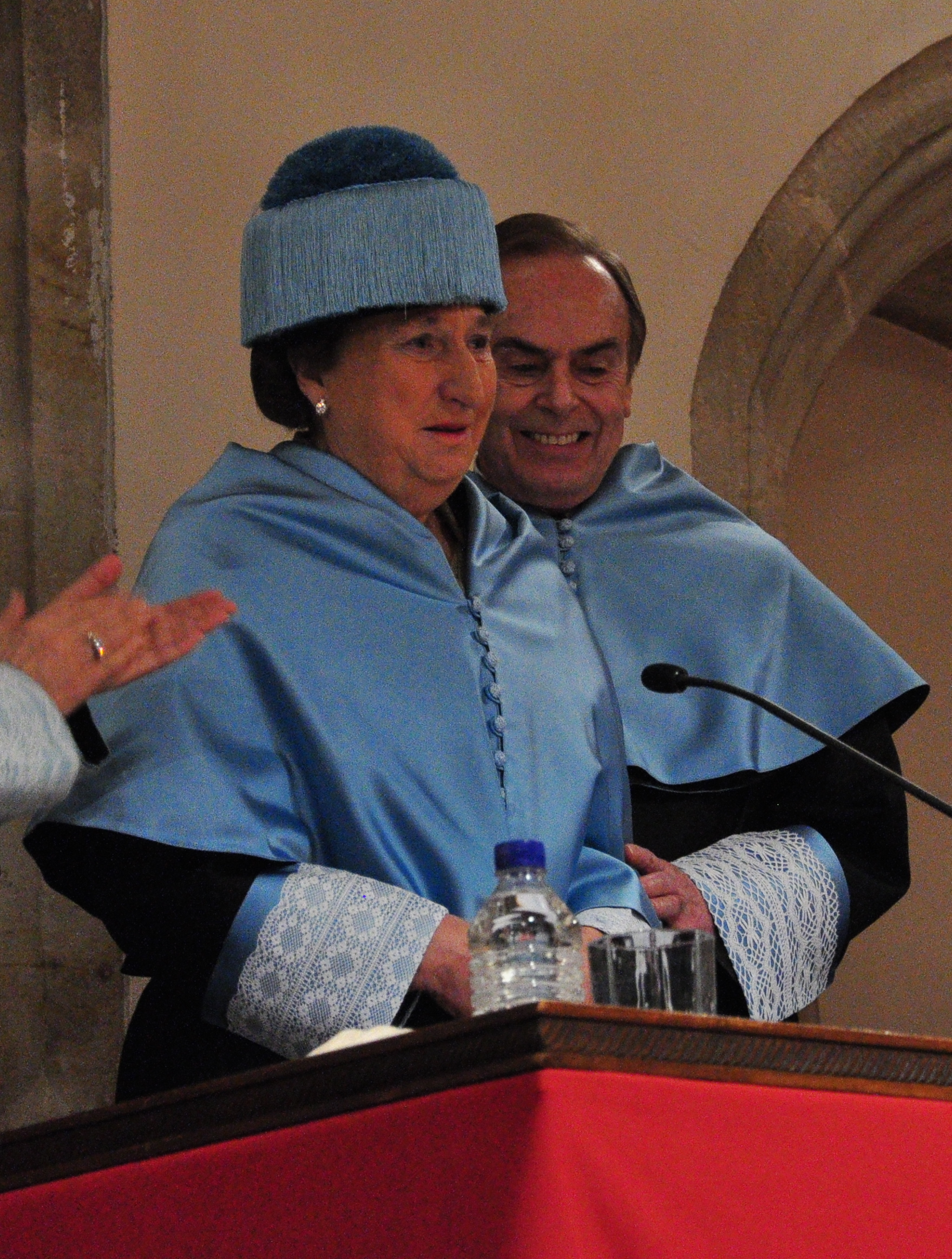
The Duchess and Duke of Soria

== House of Bourbon-Two Sicilies ==
- Princess Anne, Dowager Duchess of Calabria, is the widow of Infante Carlos, Duke of Calabria (16 January 1938 – 5 October 2015), who was the cousin of King Juan Carlos I. Princess Anne was born on 4 December 1938, and she is the daughter of Henri, Count of Paris, and Princess Isabelle of Orléans-Braganza. She married the Duke of Calabria on 11 May 1965. The couple had five children.
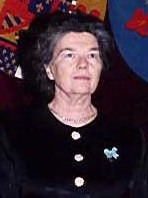
The Dowager Duchess

== Royal family tree ==
King Alfonso XII	Queen María Cristina
Prince Carlos of Bourbon-Two Sicilies	Maria de las Mercedes, Princess of Asturias	King Alfonso XIII	Queen Victoria Eugenie
Infante Alfonso, Duke of Calabria	Infanta Alicia, Duchess of Calabria	Infante Juan, Count of Barcelona	Princess María de las Mercedes, Countess of Barcelona
Infante Carlos, Duke of Calabria	The Dowager Duchess of Calabria**	Infanta Pilar, Duchess of Badajoz	King Juan Carlos I*	Queen Sofía*	The Duke of Soria and Hernani**	The Duchess of Soria and Hernani**
The Duchess of Lugo**	Infanta Cristina**	The King*	The Queen*
The Princess of Asturias*	Infanta Sofía*

Notes

* - Member of the Royal Family (as opposed to the Family of the King, or extended family)

** - Member of the Extended royal family

== Public role ==
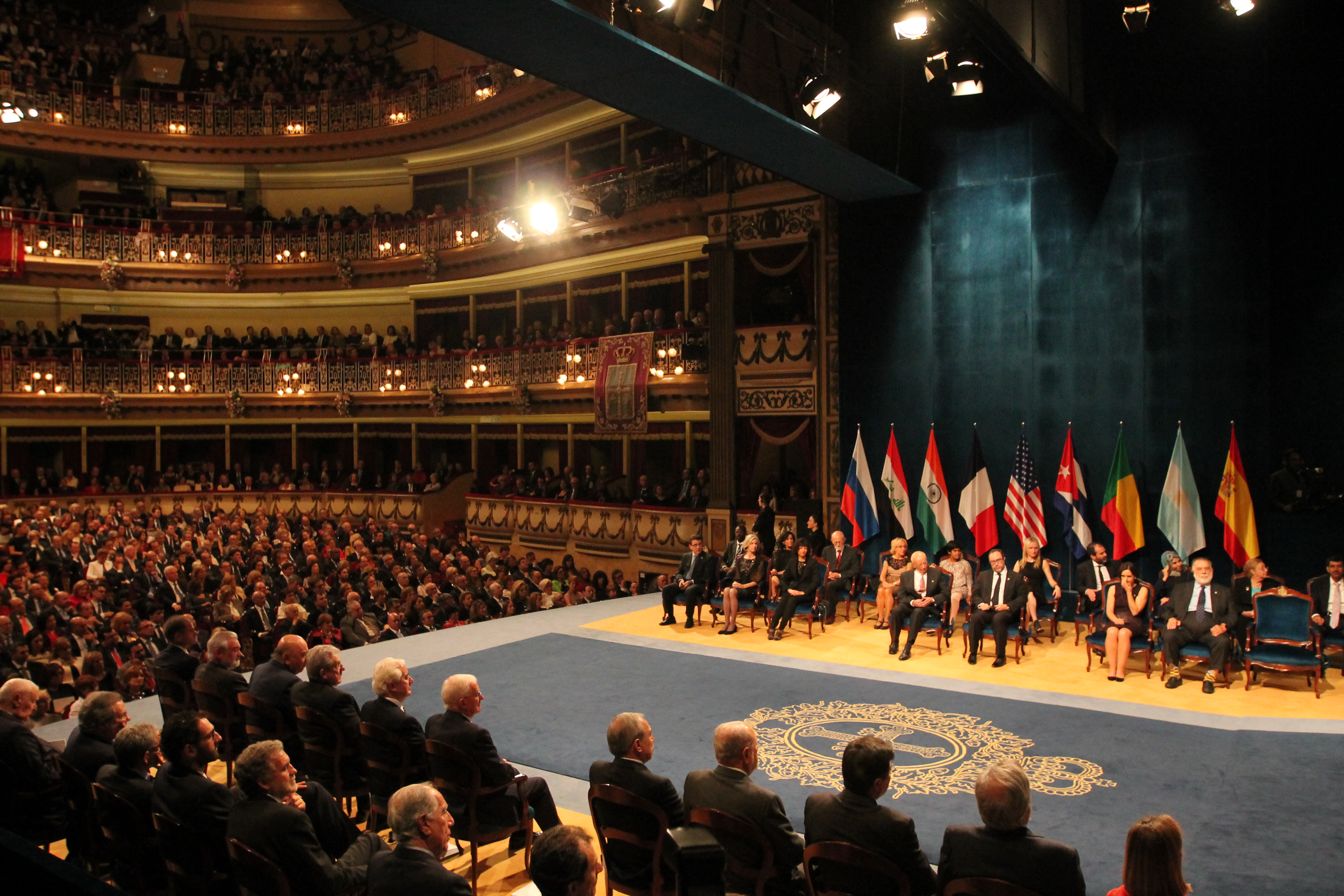
Princess of Asturias Awards ceremony

Members of the Spanish Royal Family are often asked by non-profit charitable, cultural, or religious organizations within and outside Spain to become their patrons, a role the Spanish constitution recognizes and codified in Title II Article 62 (j). It is incumbent for the monarch "to exercise the High Patronage of the Royal Academies". Royal patronage conveys a sense of official credibility as the organization is scrutinized for suitability. A royal presence often greatly raises the profile of the organization and attracts media publicity and public interest that the organization may not have otherwise garnered, aiding in the charitable cause or cultural event. Royalty make use of their considerable celebrity to assist the organization to raise funds or to promote government policy.

Additionally, members of the royal family may also pursue their own charitable and cultural interests. Queen Sofía devotes much of her time to the Queen Sofia Foundation (Fundación Reina Sofía); while Leonor, Princess of Asturias presents the annual Princess of Asturias Awards (Premios Princesa de Asturias), which aims to promote "scientific, cultural and humanistic values that form part of mankind's universal heritage." The Princess of Asturias Foundation (Fundación Princesa de Asturias) holds the annual Princess of Asturias Awards acknowledging the contributions of individuals, entities, and/or organizations from around the world who make notable achievements in the sciences, humanities, or public affairs.

King Felipe VI serves as president of the Organization of Ibero-American States which hosts the annual Ibero-American Summit, serves as president of the Codespa Foundation, which finances specific economic and social development activities in Latin American and other countries, and serves as president of the Spanish branch of the Association of European Journalists, which is composed of achieving communications professionals. King Felipe VI also serves as honorary chair of the Ministry of Culture National Awards Ceremonies.

Infanta Elena, Duchess of Lugo, Juan Carlos' elder daughter, is the Director of Cultural and Social Projects of Mapfre Foundation, while Infanta Cristina, Juan Carlos' younger daughter, served as the Goodwill Ambassador to the United Nations for the 2nd World Assembly on Ageing, and is a member of the Dali Foundation Board of Trustees, president of the International Foundation for Disabled Sailing, and Director of Social Welfare at the La Caixa Foundation in Barcelona where she lives with her family.

King Juan Carlos, Queen Sofia, and Infanta Cristina are all members of the Bilderberg Group, an informal think-tank centered on United States and European relations, and other world issues.

== See also ==
- Royal Household of Spain
- Succession to the Spanish throne
