= Succession to the Spanish throne =

Rules of succession to the Throne of Spain

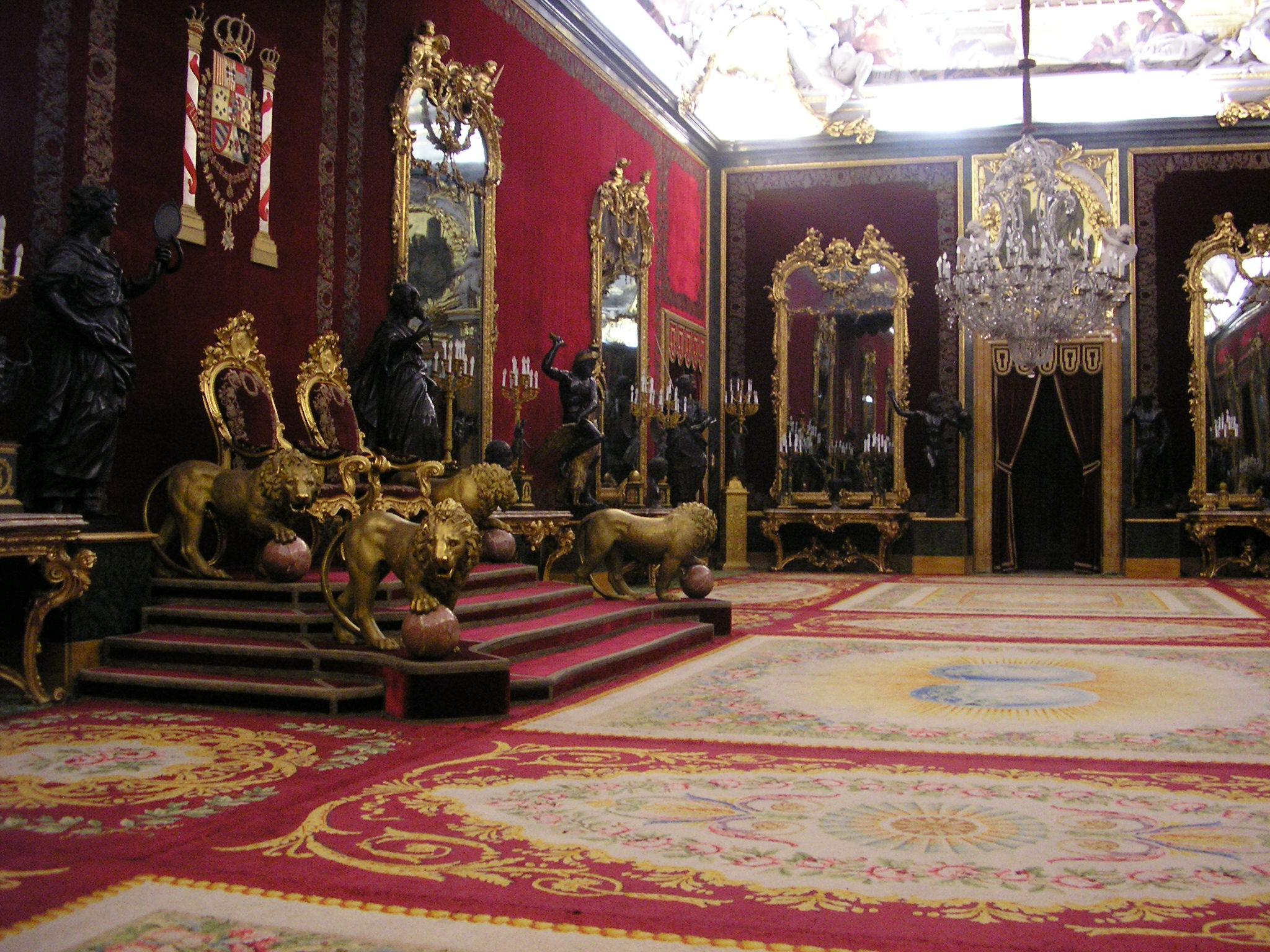
Throne in the Royal Palace of Madrid

Succession to the Spanish throne follows male-preference cognatic primogeniture. A dynast who marries against the express prohibition of the monarch and the Cortes Generales, the legislative chamber of Spain, is excluded from the succession. Upon proclamation by the Cortes Generales, the monarch is to take an oath to discharge his duties faithfully, to abide by the Constitution and the law and ensure they are abided by, and to respect the rights of the citizens and of the Autonomous Communities.

== Line of succession ==
The 1978 Constitution of Spain establishes the succession in favour of the heirs of King Juan Carlos I.

King Juan Carlos I (b. 1938)
  - King Felipe VI (b. 1968)
    - (1) Leonor, Princess of Asturias (b. 2005)
    - (2) Infanta Sofía (b. 2007)
  - (3) Infanta Elena, Duchess of Lugo (b. 1963)
    - (4) Don Felipe de Marichalar y Borbón, Lord of Tejada (b. 1998)
    - (5) Doña Victoria de Marichalar y Borbón, Lady of Tejada (b. 2000)
  - (6) Infanta Cristina (b. 1965)
    - (7) Don Juan Urdangarin y Borbón (b. 1999)
    - (8) Don Pablo Urdangarin y Borbón (b. 2000)
    - (9) Don Miguel Urdangarin y Borbón (b. 2002)
    - (10) Doña Irene Urdangarin y Borbón (b. 2005)

== Succession uncertainties ==

Section 1 of Article 57 of the 1978 Constitution of Spain provides that the Crown of Spain is hereditary to the "sucesores" of His Majesty Don Juan Carlos I de Borbón. To date, no clarification has been made whether this provision includes anyone beyond the direct descendants of King Juan Carlos. Successors may not be presumed to be synonymous with descendants. Section 3 of Article 57 further states that should all the lines designated by law become extinct, the Cortes Generales shall provide for succession to the Crown in the manner most suitable for the interests of Spain.

Infanta Pilar, Duchess of Badajoz and Infanta Margarita, Duchess of Soria, sisters of King Juan Carlos, respectively renounced their rights to the succession upon marriage but before the adoption of the Constitution. Similarly, the rights of earlier generations are clouded by renunciations and unapproved marriages which may or may not exclude them from succession.

Section 5 of Article 57 provides that abdications and renunciations and any doubt in fact or in law that may arise in relation to the succession of the Crown shall be settled by an organic act. Unless and until one clarifies the rights of the extended royal family, it is unknown who or if anyone follows Infanta Cristina's descendants in the line of succession.

=== Possible interpretations ===
- The Congress of Deputies, the lower house of the Cortes Generales, has the constitutional responsibility to clarify the succession when doubt arises. If "sucesores" is deemed to mean direct descendants, the succession ends with the heirs of Infanta Cristina.
- If the renunciations by Infanta Pilar and Infanta Margarita are not deemed valid, their descendants would follow the line of succession:
Infante Juan, Count of Barcelona (1913–1993)
  - King Juan Carlos I (b. 1938)
  - Infanta Pilar, Duchess of Badajoz and Viscountess of La Torre (1936–2020)
    - Don Juan Gómez-Acebo y Borbón, 3rd Viscount of La Torre (1969–2024)
      - (11) Don Nicolás Gómez-Acebo y Carney, 4th Viscount of La Torre (b. 2013)
    - (12) Don Bruno Gómez-Acebo y Borbón (b. 1971)
      - (13) Alejandro Gómez-Acebo y Cano (b. 2004)
      - (14) Guillermo Gómez-Acebo y Cano (b. 2005)
      - (15) Álvaro Gómez-Acebo y Cano (b. 2011)
    - (16) Don Luis Gómez-Acebo y Borbón (b. 1973)
      - (17) Luis Felipe Gómez-Acebo y Ponte (b. 2005)
      - (18) Juan Gómez-Acebo y Ponte (b. 2016)
      - (19) Laura Gómez-Acebo y Ponte (b. 2006)
    - Don Fernando Gómez-Acebo y Borbón (1974–2024)
      - (20) Nicolás Gómez-Acebo y Halamandari (b. 2016)
    - (21) Doña Simoneta Gómez-Acebo y Borbón (b. 1968)
      - (22) Luis Juan Fernández-Sastrón y Gómez-Acebo (b. 1991)
      - (23) Pablo Fernández-Sastrón y Gómez-Acebo (b. 1995)
      - (24) María de las Mercedes Fernández-Sastrón y Gómez-Acebo (b. 2000)
  - (25) Infanta Margarita, Duchess of Soria and Hernani (b. 1939)
    - (26) Don Alfonso Zurita y Borbón (b. 1973)
    - (27) Doña María Zurita y Borbón (b. 1975)
      - (28) Carlos Zurita y Borbón (n. 2018)

== Planned absolute primogeniture ==
In its 2004 election manifesto, the victorious Spanish Socialist Workers' Party (PSOE) included plans to adopt absolute primogeniture, a proposal which was supported by the leader of the main opposition party, the conservative People's Party. It was initially thought that the change would only apply to future generations but with all the major political parties in agreement that the system of male-preference primogeniture conflicts with the constitutionally established principle of gender equality, it was planned that the law would be changed before Letizia, then the Princess of Asturias, bore a son, thereby demoting Infanta Leonor in the line of succession. The subsequent announcement, in 2006, that the Princess was pregnant with a second daughter, however, removed any immediate urgency in the passage of the necessary legislation.

== See also ==
- List of heirs to the Spanish throne
- List of Spanish monarchs
- Spanish Royal Family
- Carlism
