= Infanta Elena, Duchess of Lugo =

Spanish infanta (born 1963)

Infanta Elena
- Duchess of Lugo
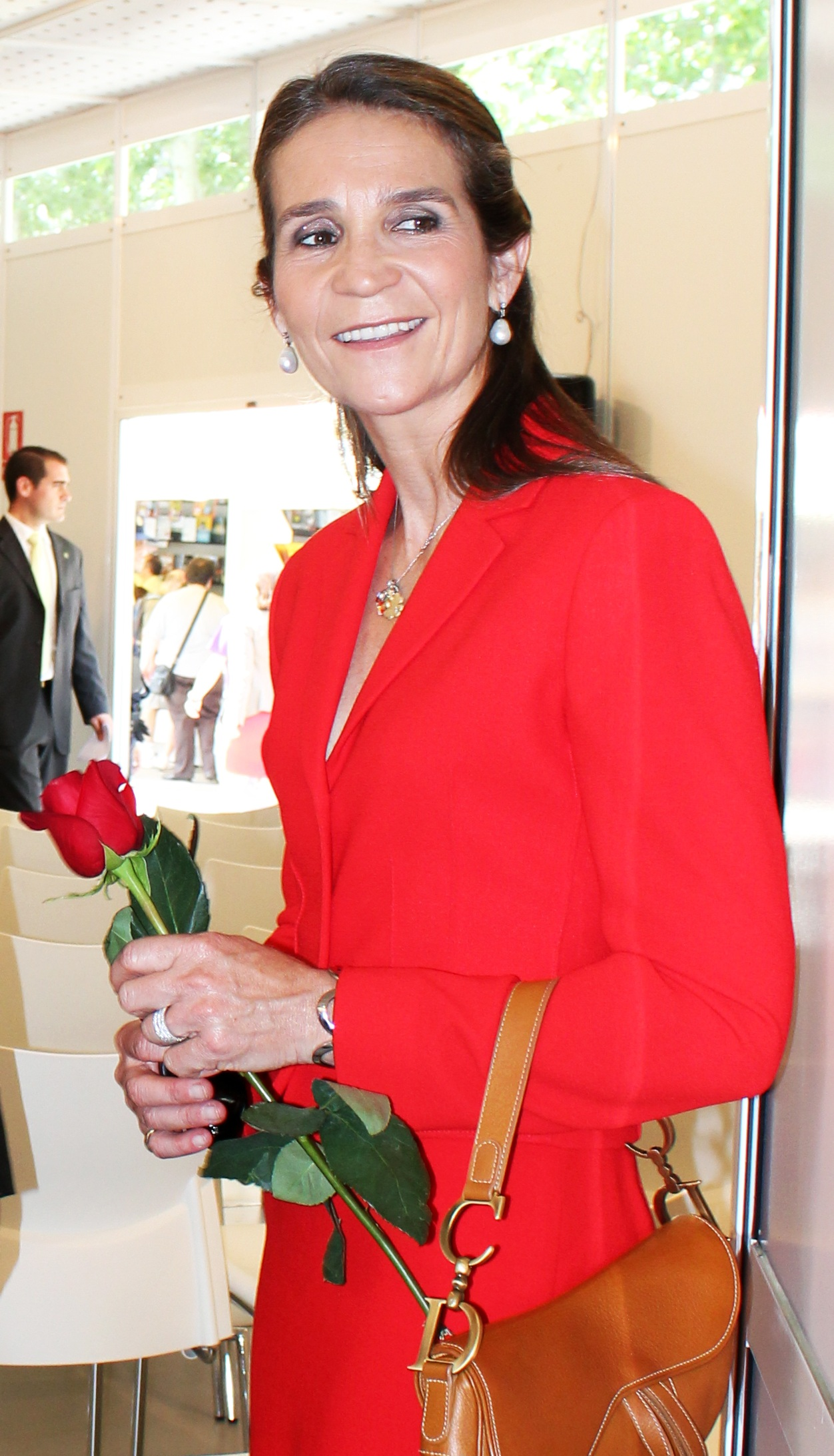
- Elena in 2011
- Born: 20 December 1963 (age 62); Our Lady of Loreto Sanatorium, Madrid, Spain
- Spouse: Jaime de Marichalar, Lord of Tejada (m. 1995; div. 2010)
- Issue: Felipe de Marichalar y Borbón; Victoria de Marichalar y Borbón
Names
- Elena María Isabel Dominica de Silos de Borbón y de Grecia
- House: Bourbon-Anjou
- Father: Juan Carlos I of Spain
- Mother: Sophia of Greece and Denmark

Infanta Elena, Duchess of Lugo (Elena María Isabel Dominica de Silos de Borbón y de Grecia; born 20 December 1963), is the first child and eldest daughter of King Juan Carlos I and Queen Sofía. As the eldest sister of King Felipe VI, Elena is the third in the line of succession to the Spanish throne, behind her nieces, Leonor, Princess of Asturias and Infanta Sofía. She has a younger sister, Infanta Cristina.

On 3 March 1995, on the occasion of her marriage to Jaime de Marichalar y Sáenz de Tejada, Lord of Tejada, her father gave her the title of Duchess of Lugo. The title, as part of the titles belonging to the Spanish crown, was granted to her for life and her descendants will not be able to inherit it.

Since the ascension of her younger brother to the Spanish throne, Elena has not been part of the royal family. However, just as she did during her father's reign, she currently represents the Crown when required by the monarch. She has also represented her family abroad on several occasions, having travelled to Germany, the United Kingdom, the United States, Argentina, Japan, Peru, and the Philippines.

== Early life and family ==
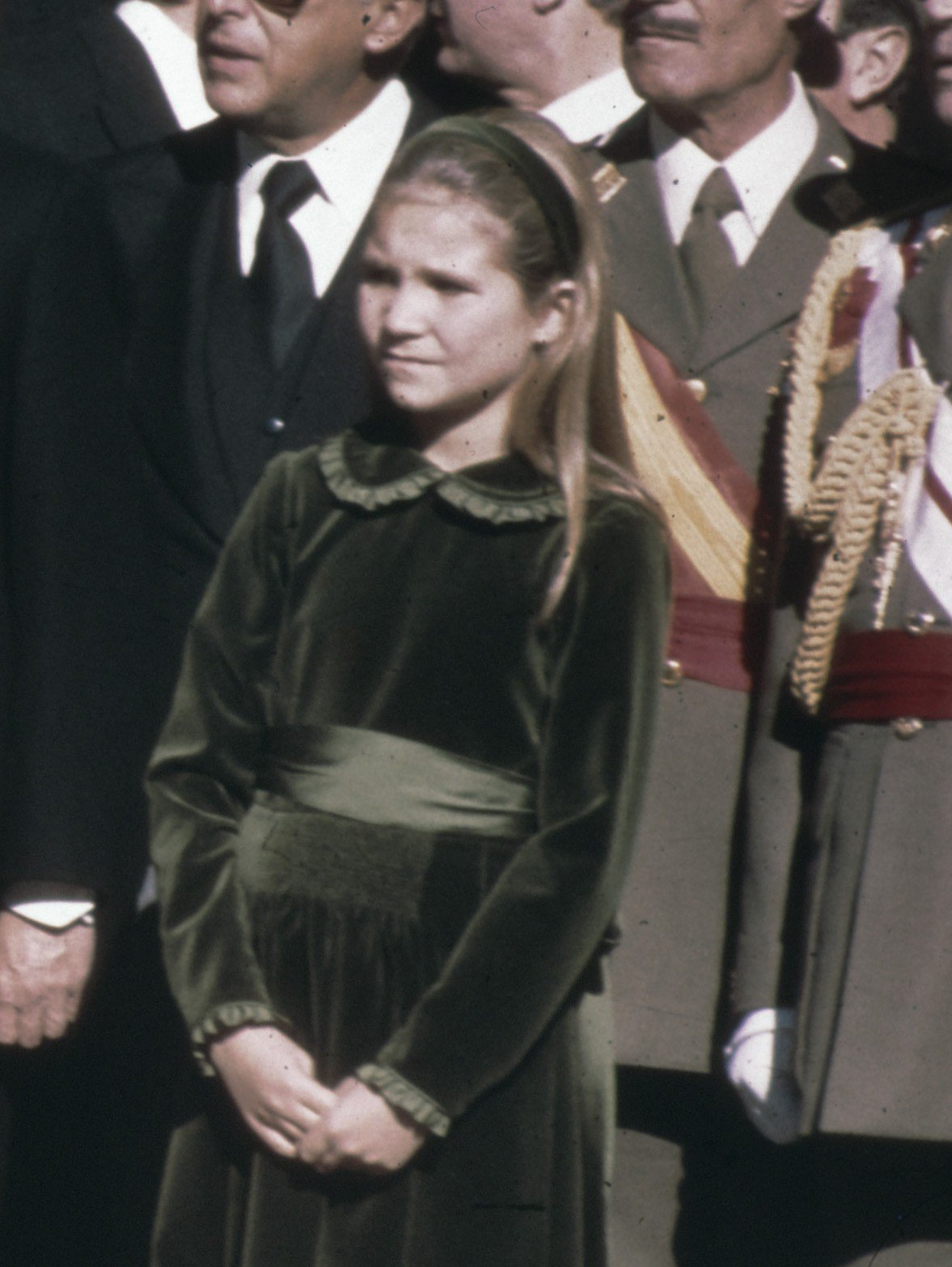
Elena as a child in 1975

Infanta Elena was born on 20 December 1963 at Our Lady of Loreto Sanatorium, now known as ORPEA Madrid Loreto, in Madrid. She is the first member to be born in a hospital from King Juan Carlos I's family and the eldest child of Juan Carlos I, the former Spanish monarch, and Queen Sofía (born Princess of Greece and Denmark). She has one sister and one brother.

Elena studied at Santa María del Camino School in Madrid and got a diploma as a secondary school teacher in 1986, with a specialty in English studies. She later moved to Paris to study French literature; it was during this time that she met her future husband. After working as an English teacher at her childhood school, she graduated in education sciences from the Comillas Pontifical University in 1993.

== Equestrianism ==
From her childhood, Elena had a love of horse riding, a passion that she inherited from her grandmother, Princess María de las Mercedes, Countess of Barcelona. It was during her adolescence that she began to make a name for herself in the world of show jumping. She debuted in an official competition in 1982 at the Club de Campo Villa de Madrid. Afterwards, in the late 1980s, King Juan Carlos ordered the construction of stables and a riding arena at the Royal Palace of Zarzuela so that his daughter could practice her hobby in the palace. As of 2023, although she no longer resides in Zarzuela nor is she part of the royal family, she continues to use these facilities, which she funds.

Elena was described by fellow equestrian Luis Jaime Carvajal y Salas, 5th Duke of Aveyro, as a "very good [rider]" but he pointed that her problem was that horse riding "requires time and she doesn't have it" as a member of the royal family.

Some of the Infanta's most notable horses are Qant (her favorite horse since 2011) and Jordano EB (Qant's successor), a chestnut horse that she bred herself. As of 2016, Elena owned at least eight horses.

Elena has had several equestrian teachers, but no official one since she left the royal family. The most important are Felipe de Zuleta y Alejandro from 2006 to 2015, an official of the Royal Guard and brother of the Duke of Abrantes, private secretary of Queen Letizia from 2014 to 2024, and Luis Astolfi Pérez de Guzmán, a former boyfriend and currently a close friend of hers. Luis and Elena rekindled their friendship in 2013 after many years with no contact.

She shares this hobby with her daughter, Victoria, Grandee of Spain, as well as watching bullfighting.

== Marriage and children ==
Elena met Jaime de Marichalar y Sáenz de Tejada, Lord of Tejada, son of the Amalio de Marichalar y Bruguera, 8th Count of Ripalda, for the first time in 1987 in Paris. Elena was studying French literature in the French capital while Jaime was working for Credit Suisse. Soon after they met, they became a couple. But it was not until 1993 that the press got the first photographs of the couple and during 1994 wedding rumors increased. On 23 November 1994, the Royal Household announced their official engagement.

The formal marriage proposal was made on 26 November 1994 at the Royal Palace of Zarzuela. The engagement ring was a diamond ring part of a tiara belonging to the groom's mother, María de la Concepción Sáenz de Tejada y Fernández de Bobadilla, Lady of Tejada. In addition to the immediate royal family, Princess María de las Mercedes, Countess of Barcelona (the bride's grandmother), Infanta Pilar, Duchess of Badajoz (the bride's aunt) and the Duchess and Duke of Soria (the bride's aunt and uncle) were present.

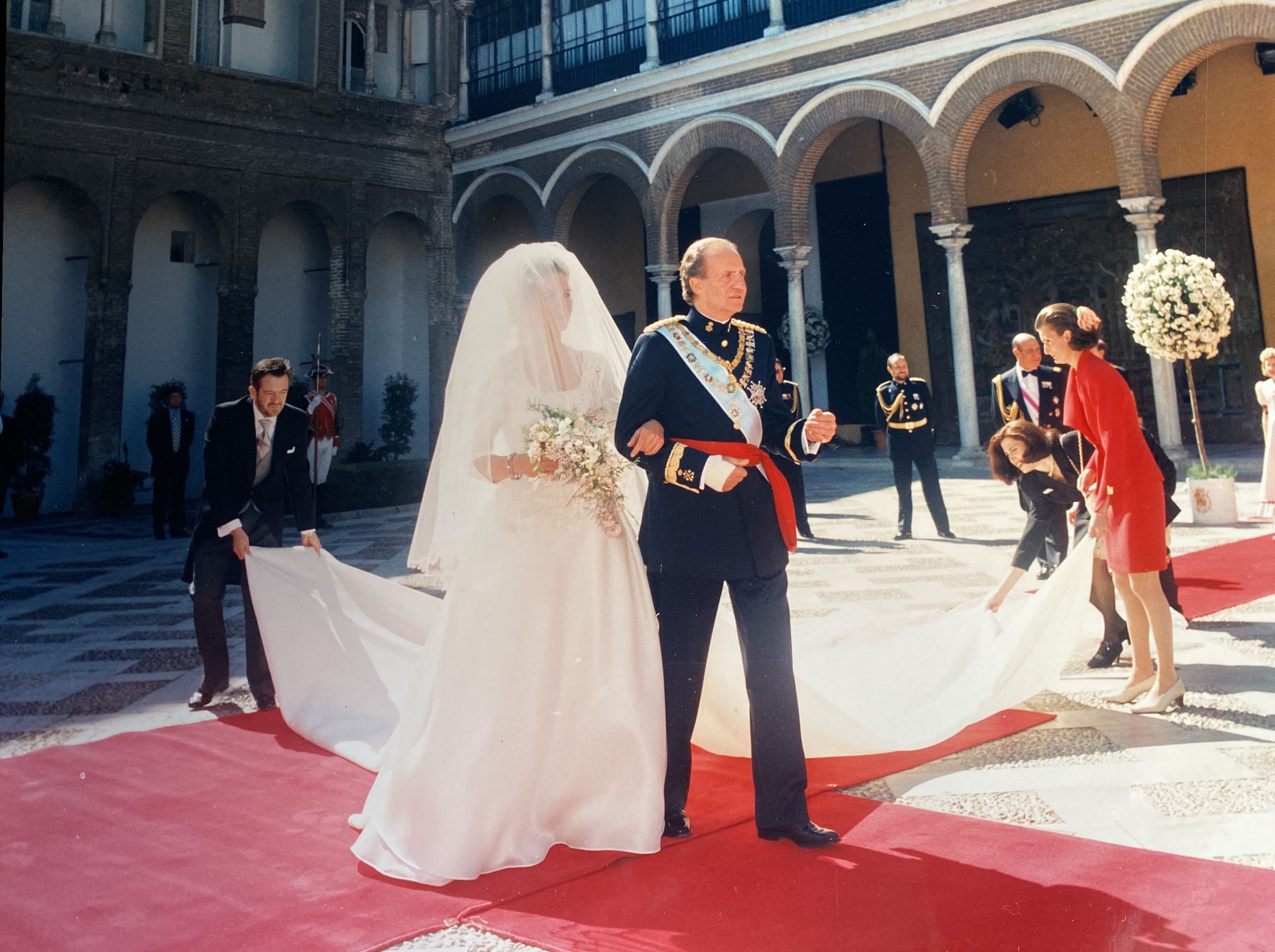
Elena and her father, King Juan Carlos, on the day of the wedding.

Their wedding took place on 18 March 1995, in Seville Cathedral. It was the first royal wedding in Spain since the wedding of King Alfonso XIII and Princess Victoria Eugenie of Battenberg in 1906. Around 1,500 guests, including representatives of 39 royal houses, attended. 150,000 citizens filled the streets around the Cathedral. Also, to celebrate the occasion, King Juan Carlos gave Infanta Elena the title of Duchess of Lugo.

The couple has two children: Felipe de Marichalar y Borbón (born 17 July 1998) and Victoria de Marichalar y Borbón (born 9 September 2000) were born at Ruber International Hospital in Madrid. On 26 June 2003, a few days after the king announced his daughter's third pregnancy, Elena suffered a miscarriage. As children of an Infanta of Spain, Elena's children are Grandees of Spain.

On 13 November 2007, it was announced that Elena had separated from her husband. In November 2009, the Spanish media reported that she and her husband would divorce, although a rumour to that effect had been circulating for a year before the announcement was made. Their divorce papers were signed on 25 November 2009. The Duchess and Duke consort of Lugo were divorced in December 2009. On 21 January 2010, the divorce was registered at the Civil Registry of the Spanish Royal Family and it was officially announced on 9 February 2010; Jaime de Marichalar was no longer permitted to use the ducal title nor was he considered an official member of the Spanish Royal Family.

== Activities and personal work ==
Elena started to attend official events at a very young age. One of the first was the proclamation of her father's ascension to the throne in November 1975. Since finishing her basic education in 1983, Elena, along with her sister Cristina, has supported their parents. They represented the Crown at official events such as the National Day, the wedding of Princess Astrid of Belgium, the re-burial of Queen Victoria Eugenia at El Escorial, the state visit of Mexican president Miguel de la Madrid to Spain, and the 1984 Prince of Asturias Awards ceremony, among others.

Since her brother's ascension to the throne in June 2014 and her departure from the royal family, Elena has reduced her public appearances. However, that year she did represent the Crown at some events, such as the funeral of Cayetana Fitz-James Stuart, 18th Duchess of Alba in November 2014 and the presentation of the National Sports Awards in December 2014. Since then, Elena has limited her institutional activity to annually presiding over the awards ceremony for the Patrimonio Nacional's Children's and Youth Painting Contest.

In addition to her obligations as an infanta, Elena has a job that allows her to compensate for the lack of public salary by not being a member of the royal family. Elena has worked at the Mapfre Foundation since 2008 and currently serves as director of social and cultural projects. In this role, Elena has helped the foundation to promote projects and give visibility to various cooperation programs in Latin America through several international tours. Most of her public appearances are related to the social activities of this foundation.

== Titles, styles and honours ==
Her coat of arms since her divorce.

=== Titles and styles ===
- 20 December 1963 – 3 March 1995: Her Royal Highness Infanta Doña Elena
- 3 March 1995 – present: Her Royal Highness Infanta Doña Elena, Duchess of Lugo

=== Honours ===
==== National ====
- Spain:
  - Dame Grand Cross of the Royal and Distinguished Spanish Order of Charles III
  - Dame Grand Cross of the Royal Order of Isabella the Catholic
  - Dame of the Royal Cavalry Armory of Seville
  - Dame of the Royal Cavalry Armory of Zaragoza

==== Foreign ====
- Austria: Grand Star of the Decoration of Honour for Services to the Republic of Austria
- Belgium: Grand Cordon of the Order of Leopold
- Chile: Grand Cross of the Order of Merit
- Greece: Grand Cross of the Order of Honour
- Guatemala: Grand Cross of the Order of the Quetzal
- Iceland: Grand Cross of the Order of the Falcon
- Italy: Grand Cross of the Order of Merit of the Italian Republic
- Japan: Grand Cordon (Paulownia) of the Order of the Precious Crown
- Jordan: Grand Cordon of the Order of the Star of Jordan
- Luxembourg: Grand Cross of the Order of Adolphe of Nassau
- Kingdom of Nepal: Member 1st Class of the Order of the Three Divine Powers
- Netherlands: Knight Grand Cross of the Order of Orange-Nassau
- Norway: Grand Cross of the Order of Saint Olav
- Peru: Grand Cross of the Order of the Sun of Peru
- Portugal: Grand Cross of the Order of Christ
- Portugal: Grand Cross of the Order of Prince Henry
- Sweden: Recipient of the 50th Birthday Badge Medal of King Carl XVI Gustaf

== See also ==
- Line of succession to the Spanish Throne

Infanta Elena, Duchess of Lugo House of Bourbon Cadet branch of the Capetian dynasty Born: 20 December 1963
Lines of succession
Preceded by Infanta Sofía	Line of succession to the Spanish throne 3rd in line	Succeeded by Felipe de Marichalar
