= Jaime de Marichalar =

Spanish noble (born 1963)

- Lord of Tejada
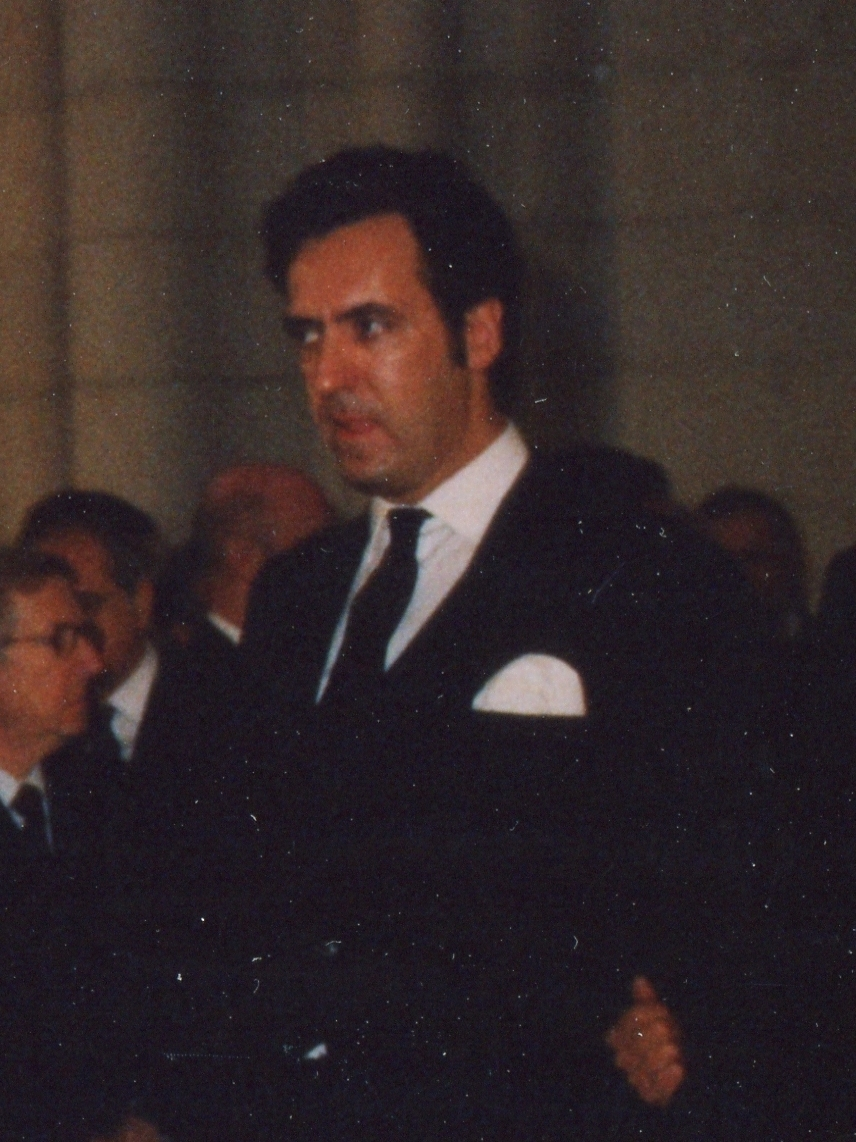
- de Marichalar in 2004
- Born: Jaime de Marichalar y Sáenz; 7 April 1963 (age 63); Pamplona, Spain
- Noble family: Marichalar
- Spouse: Infanta Elena of Spain (m. 1995; div. 2010)
- Issue: Felipe de Marichalar y Borbón; Victoria de Marichalar y Borbón

Jaime de Marichalar y Sáenz, Lord of Tejada (born 7 April 1963), is the former husband of the Infanta Elena, Duchess of Lugo, the eldest daughter of King Juan Carlos and Queen Sofía of Spain.

== Personal life ==
Of Navarran Basque Carlist aristocracy, Jaime is the third of the five sons and one daughter of Amalio de Marichalar y Bruguera, 8th Count of Ripalda (13 May 1912 – 26 December 1979), and his wife (m. Torrecilla de Cameros, born 25 July 1957) María de la Concepción Sáenz de Tejada y Fernández de Boadilla, Lady of the Manor of Tejada (3 January 1929 – 13 March 2014). He studied at the Jesuit schools in Burgos, San Estanislao de Kostka in Madrid and Yago School in Dublin, Ireland.

His higher education focused on Economics and he specialized in Business Management and Marketing, although he never obtained a degree. In 1986, he gained practical work experience in a number of financial businesses in Paris, where he lived as a bachelor and during the early years of his marriage.

After a number of years working in the international financial markets sector, in January 1998 he was appointed Managing Director's Senior Advisor for Crédit Suisse First Boston in Madrid. He is also an advisor of Sociedad General Inmobiliaria. He was President of the Winterthur Foundation, which promotes cultural activities. On 21 November 2008 he left as President of the AXA Foundation, the former Winterthur Foundation.

Since 1995, he has been a member of the Real Maestranza de Caballería de Sevilla (Royal Cavalry Armory of Seville), a noble guild created in 1670.

In 2001, he suffered a stroke, and largely retired from public life.

== Marriage and children ==
In 1987, Jaime de Marichalar met his future wife, Infanta Elena of Spain, while she was studying French literature in Paris and he was working there.

On 18 March 1995, they married in Seville Cathedral, Seville. The couple has two children: Felipe (born 17 July 1998) and Victoria (born 9 September 2000), They were born at Ruber International Hospital in Madrid. The couple lived initially in Paris and then from 1998 in the Salamanca district of Madrid.

On 13 November 2007 it was announced that he and his wife had separated. In November 2009, the Spanish media announced that Jaime de Marichalar and Infanta Elena would immediately divorce, although a rumour to that effect had been circulating for a year before the announcement was made. Their divorce papers were signed on 25 November 2009. The couple were divorced in December 2009. On 21 January 2010 the divorce was registered in the Civil Registry of the Spanish Royal Family. It was officially announced on 9 February 2010 that, following his divorce, Jaime de Marichalar would no longer be permitted to use his former wife's ducal title or the styles Grandee of Spain and Excellency, and that he is no longer considered to be an official member of the Spanish royal family.

Since then, Marichalar has remained out of the public eye, making no statements or giving no interviews. He has occasionally reappeared to support his former family, such as at the funeral of Princess Irene of Greece and Denmark. Professionally, he has been a member of the board of directors of Fendi since 2018.

== Titles, honours and arms ==
=== Titles and styles ===
Marichalar is since birth Lord of Tejada, a hereditary lordship dating from the 9th century that has the peculiarity that it is transmissible to the offspring of either gender (instead of only to the firstborn son) and is shared in copropriety with the other registered descendants of the noble lineages of Tejada, by his mother, who is descended from Sancho de Tejada. On 18 March 1995, he married the Infanta Elena de Borbón, eldest daughter of King Juan Carlos I of Spain, in the Cathedral of Seville. Upon their marriage, his wife was granted the title of Duchess of Lugo by the royal household, and Jaime as her consort received the predicate of excellency and Duke of Lugo. On 21 January 2010, following the registration of their divorce in the civil status of the royal family, he lost the predicate of excellency and title as well as his quality of member of the Spanish royal family.

- 7 April 1963 – 18 March 1995: Don Jaime de Marichalar y Sáenz de Tejada.
- 18 March 1995 – 21 January 2010: His Excellency Don Jaime de Marichalar, Duke of Lugo.
- 21 January 2010 – present: Don Jaime de Marichalar y Sáenz de Tejada.

=== Honours ===
==== National honours ====
- Knight of the Royal Cavalry Armory of Seville (17 March 1995)

==== Foreign honours ====
- Austria: Grand Decoration of Honour in Gold with Sash (2 June 1997)
- Italy: Knight Grand Cross of the Order of Merit of the Italian Republic (27 June 1996)
- Jordan: Grand Cordon of the Order of Independence (20 September 1999)
- Luxembourg: Grand Cross of the Order of the Oak Crown (7 June 2001)
- Sweden: Recipient of the 50th Birthday Medal of King Carl XVI Gustaf (30 April 1996)

=== Arms ===
Heraldry of Jaime de Marichalar

The arms of Jaime de Marichalar as Duke of Lugo (1995–2010)	The arms of Jaime de Marichalar since 21 January 2010
