= Leonor, Princess of Asturias =

Heir to the Spanish throne (born 2005)

Leonor
- Princess of Asturias (more)
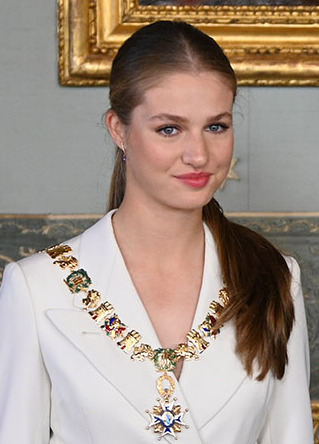
- Leonor in 2023
- Born: 31 October 2005 (age 21); Madrid, Spain
Names
- Leonor de Todos los Santos de Borbón y Ortiz
- House: Bourbon-Anjou
- Father: Felipe VI
- Mother: Letizia Ortiz Rocasolano
- Education: UWC Atlantic College (2021–2023); Charles III University of Madrid (2026–present)
- Military career
- Allegiance: Spain
- Branch: Spanish Armed Forces (Note: Leonor is serving in all three branches of the Armed Forces (the Spanish Army, Spanish Air and Space Force and Spanish Navy).)
- Service years: 2023–2026
- Rank: See list

Leonor, Princess of Asturias (Note: In the languages of Spain, her name is: Aragonese: Alionor; Asturian: Lleonor; Basque, Occitan and Spanish: Leonor, Spanish pronunciation: [leoˈnoɾ]; Catalan: Elionor; Galician: Lionor.) (Leonor de Todos los Santos de Borbón y Ortiz; (Note: In the languages of Spain: Aragonese: Alionor de Totz os Santos de Borbón y Ortiz; Asturian: Lleonor de Tolos Santos de Borbón y Ortiz; Basque: Santu Guztien Leonor Borboikoa eta Ortiz; Catalan: Elionor de Tots els Sants de Borbó i Ortiz; Galician: Lionor de Todos os Santos de Borbón Ortiz; Occitan: Leonor de Tots los Sants de Borbon Ortiz.) born 31 October 2005) is the heir presumptive to the Spanish throne. She is the elder daughter of King Felipe VI and Queen Letizia.

Leonor was born during the reign of her paternal grandfather, King Juan Carlos I. She was educated at Santa María de los Rosales School, like her father; after finishing her secondary studies, she studied for an International Baccalaureate at the UWC Atlantic College in the Vale of Glamorgan in Wales, United Kingdom. In 2014, following her father's accession to the throne after the abdication of her grandfather, Leonor was granted all the traditional titles of the heir to the Spanish crown. These are Princess of Asturias, Princess of Girona, Princess of Viana, Duchess of Montblanc, Countess of Cervera, and Lady of Balaguer. Leonor was formally proclaimed heiress before the Cortes on 31 October 2023, her 18th birthday.

Before pursuing higher education, Leonor completed three years of military training, graduating as an officer in all three branches of the Spanish Armed Forces. Since September 2026, she has been studying political science at the Charles III University of Madrid.

== Early life and family ==
Leonor was born at 01:46 on 31 October 2005 at the Ruber International Hospital in Madrid, three weeks before her due date. She was born by caesarean section due to non-progression of labour. Her parents, Felipe and Letizia, were then the Prince and Princess of Asturias, and her paternal grandfather, King Juan Carlos I, was the reigning monarch. As the daughter of the heir apparent, Leonor was an infanta and second in the line of succession to the Spanish throne. Her birth was announced to the press by the royal family via SMS.

Shortly after her birth, Leonor's umbilical cord stem cells were sent to a blood bank in Tucson, Arizona. The decision prompted public debate in Spain because the bank was private and located abroad. She left the Ruber International Hospital with her parents on 7 November.

Leonor was baptised at Zarzuela Palace on 14 January 2006 by the archbishop of Madrid, Cardinal Antonio Rouco Varela. Like her father, she was baptised with water from the Jordan River in a Romanesque baptismal font that has been used to christen Spanish princes since the 17th century. Her godparents were her paternal grandparents, King Juan Carlos I and Queen Sofía. She was given the name Leonor de Todos los Santos.

During her early months, Leonor developed a small angioma, a benign tumour of blood vessels, on her nose. It was visible during her baptism and was initially mistaken for a scratch. Despite media speculation about possible surgery, sources close to the royal family said that no procedure was considered. The angioma disappeared within months.

== Education ==
Leonor's education began in 2007 at Escuela Infantil Guardia Real, the daycare for the children of the Spanish Royal Guard. She began her first year of pre-school on 15 September 2008 at the Santa María de los Rosales School in Aravaca, Madrid. She later began her first year of primary school in September 2011 at the Santa María de los Rosales School. Leonor was reported to have good grades during her studies at Rosales.

In September 2021, Leonor began studying a two-year International Baccalaureate programme at the UWC Atlantic College in Llantwit Major, Wales. She completed her secondary education in May 2023. Leonor also attended summer camps in the United States. She is fluent in Spanish, Catalan and English, having learnt English from her British nanny and her grandmother, Queen Sofía, and has studied French, Galician, Basque, Arabic and Mandarin.

=== Military training ===
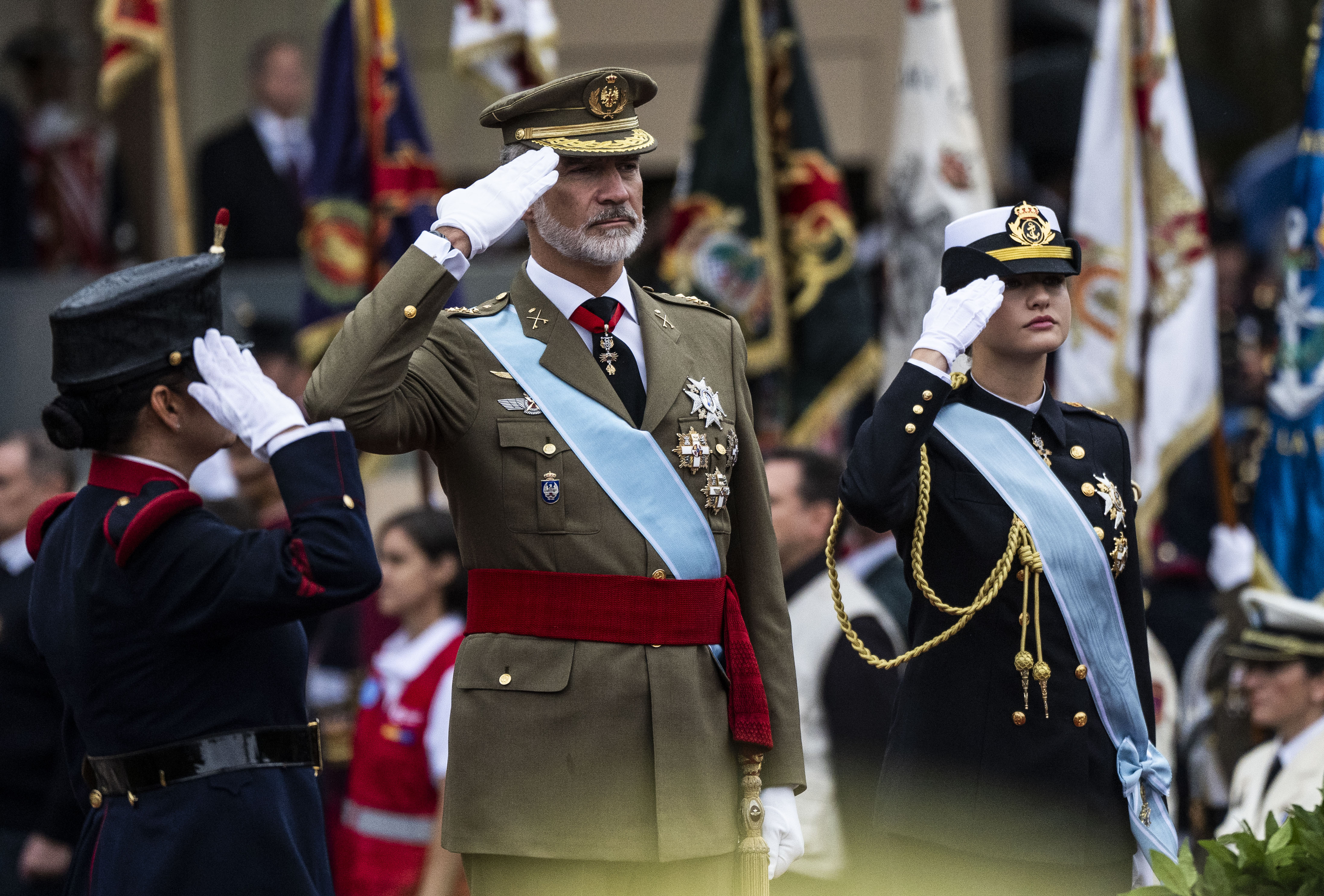
The King and the Princess of Asturias during the 2024 National Day of Spain.

In preparation for her role as Spain's commander-in-chief and following in her father's footsteps, Leonor undertook three years of army, naval and air force training at the General Military Academy in Zaragoza, the Naval Military Academy in Marín and the General Air Academy in Murcia, respectively. In March 2023, Defence Minister Margarita Robles announced that the government had approved a royal decree setting out the framework for Leonor's military training and career. Leonor chose to use both of her parents' surnames, "Borbón Ortiz", in her military career. She also renounced the salary and allowances received by cadets while attending the military academies.

On 17 August 2023, she began her first year of training at the General Military Academy in Zaragoza. She received the officer's sabre on 19 September 2023. Leonor swore an oath of allegiance to the Spanish flag at the General Military Academy on 7 October 2023, in the presence of her parents. In January 2024, Leonor participated in the 24th Sports Championship of Military Academies for Officers, competing in fencing and volleyball as one of the representatives of the General Military Academy. Her team won a silver medal in the mixed team fencing competition. In June 2024, she completed army manoeuvre exercises in the mountains of Navaleno and San Leonardo de Yagüe in Soria province. She was trained by Colonel José Gonzálvez Vallés and Lieutenant Colonel Margarita Pardo de Santayana. Leonor was promoted to the rank of Cadet Ensign (Spanish: Alférez) and awarded the Grand Cross of Military Merit by her father, King Felipe VI, on 3 July 2024.

On 23 July 2024, the Council of Ministers appointed her Midshipman (Spanish: Guardiamarina), in preparation for her entry into the Naval Military Academy at the end of August. On 29 August 2024, she started her naval training at the Naval Military Academy in Marín. In September 2024, Leonor and other students from the Naval School conducted seamanship training in the Pontevedra Estuary. On 8 January 2025, she boarded the training ship Juan Sebastián de Elcano, beginning a five-month voyage three days later during which she trained as a sailor and visited several Latin American countries and New York City. After disembarking in New York, she returned to Spain by plane and spent a month aboard the frigate Blas de Lezo, participating in naval manoeuvres with live fire. She rejoined the training ship on 2 July to complete her journey in mid-July. On 16 July 2025, Leonor was promoted to Midshipman 2nd grade and awarded the Grand Cross of Naval Merit by her father.

On 1 September 2025, Leonor began her third and final year of military training at the General Air and Space Academy in San Javier. On 18 December 2025, she made her first solo flight in a Pilatus PC-21; she was the first female member of the Spanish royal family to fly solo.

Leonor attended the 2025 National Day with the Air Force uniform

On 25 April 2026, Leonor participated in the 25th Inter-University Canoeing Regatta held in Santiago de la Ribera, on the Mar Menor. Competing as part of the General Air Academy, where she was undergoing military training, she took part in a mixed-team canoeing event alongside fellow cadets. Her team finished in second place, earning a silver medal.

In May 2026, she completed the Spanish Air and Space Force basic parachute course, becoming the first member of the royal family to do so. Leonor thereby earned the right to wear the parachutist badge known as "Rokiski" on her uniform.

Leonor completed her military training in July 2026, when she was promoted to alférez de fragata alumna and awarded the Grand Cross of Aeronautical Merit. In the summer of 2027, she is scheduled to receive her official commission and be promoted to lieutenant (Army and Air Force) and alférez de navío (Navy).

=== University studies ===
On 27 April 2026, it was announced that Leonor would attend Charles III University of Madrid. She began a bachelor's degree in political science in September 2026. The four-year programme also includes subjects in the humanities, law, sociology, economics and international relations.

== Princess of Asturias ==
=== Early years ===
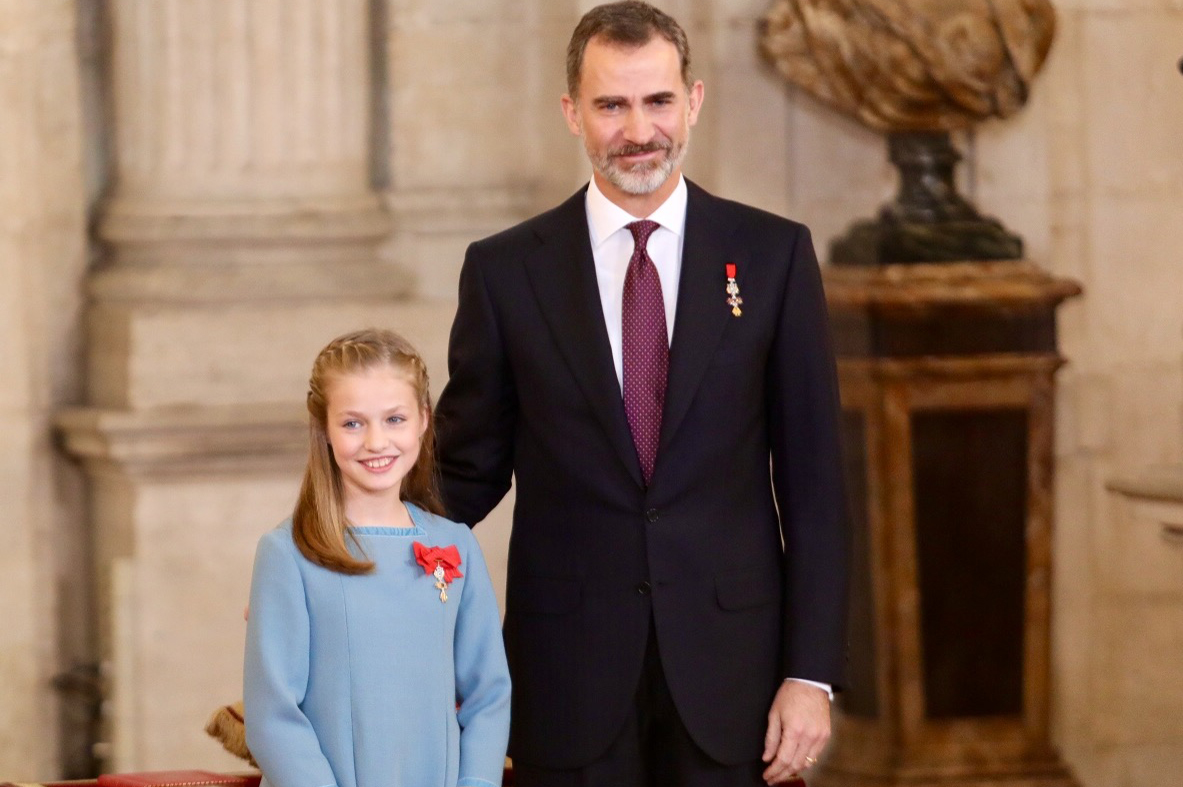
With her father, the King, during the 2018 Golden Fleece award ceremony at the Royal Palace.

In May 2014, Leonor made her first official visit to the San Javier Air Force base in Murcia. On 18 June 2014, King Juan Carlos signed the Abdication Act, and Felipe ascended the throne as King Felipe VI the following day, making Leonor his heir presumptive and Princess of Asturias. In October 2014, a wax figure of Leonor was unveiled at the Museo de Cera in Madrid. On 20 May 2015, Leonor received her First Communion according to Catholic custom.

According to the Spanish constitution of 1978, succession to the Spanish throne follows male-preference cognatic primogeniture, meaning that Leonor, as the elder of Felipe's two daughters, is first in line to inherit the throne. Under current law, however, if her father has a legitimate son while still king, Leonor would be displaced in the line of succession and again become an infanta of Spain. There have been discussions about changing the succession law to absolute primogeniture, allowing for the inheritance of the eldest child, regardless of sex; however, the birth of Leonor, followed by that of her younger sister Sofía, stalled these plans. Despite a change from male-preference to absolute primogeniture for Spanish titles of nobility in 2009, as of 2025 no legislation has been passed affecting the succession to the throne.

The day before her 10th birthday, she was granted the Order of the Golden Fleece by her father. In addition, the Council of Ministers approved the design of her personal standard and guidon. Coinciding with the 50th birthday of King Felipe, in January 2018, the King officially gave Leonor the collar of the Golden Fleece in a ceremony at the Royal Palace of Madrid.

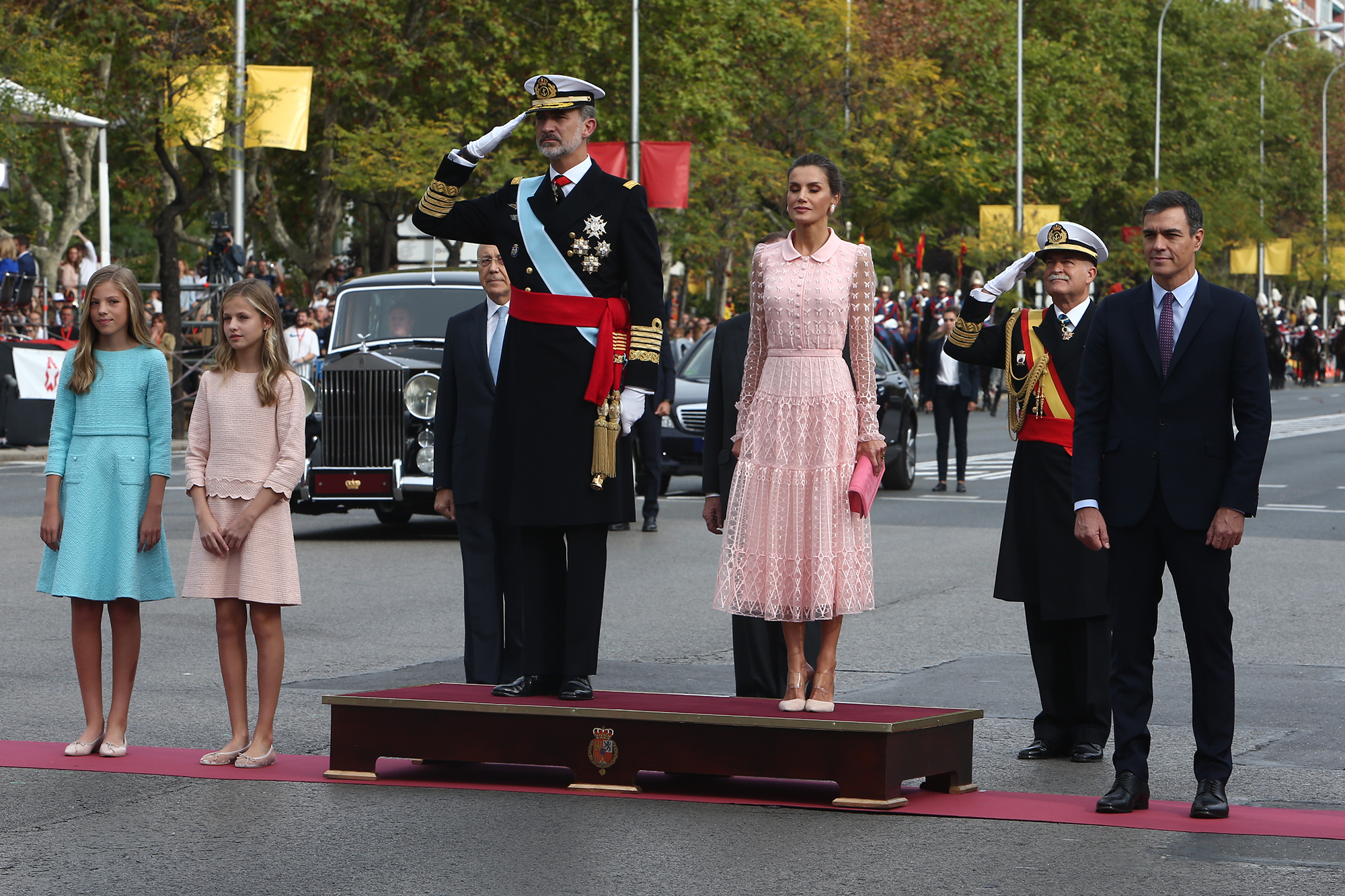
With her family and the main Spanish civil and military authorities during the 2019 National Day festivities.

In September 2018, Leonor carried out her first public engagement outside the palace by accompanying her parents to Covadonga to celebrate the 1300th anniversary of the Kingdom of Asturias. On 31 October 2018, Leonor gave her first public speech, held at the Instituto Cervantes in Madrid, where she read the first article of the Constitution of Spain. The speech coincided with the 40th anniversary of the Constitution and her 13th birthday. She made her first significant speech at Premio Princesa de Asturias on 18 October 2019. She made her first speech on 4 November 2019 at the Princess of Girona Foundation awards in Barcelona, in which she spoke in Spanish, Catalan, English and Arabic.

Leonor carried out her first public solo engagement on 24 March 2021 by attending a ceremony to mark the 30th anniversary of the Instituto Cervantes. Leonor made her first official international trip on 16 July 2022. Travelling without her parents but accompanied by her younger sister, Infanta Sofía, she attended a UEFA Women's Euro 2022 match between Spain and Denmark. In December 2022, Leonor visited the Spanish Red Cross headquarters in Madrid where she met young volunteers of The Red Cross Youth, the youth section of the Spanish Red Cross.

=== Heir's oath ===
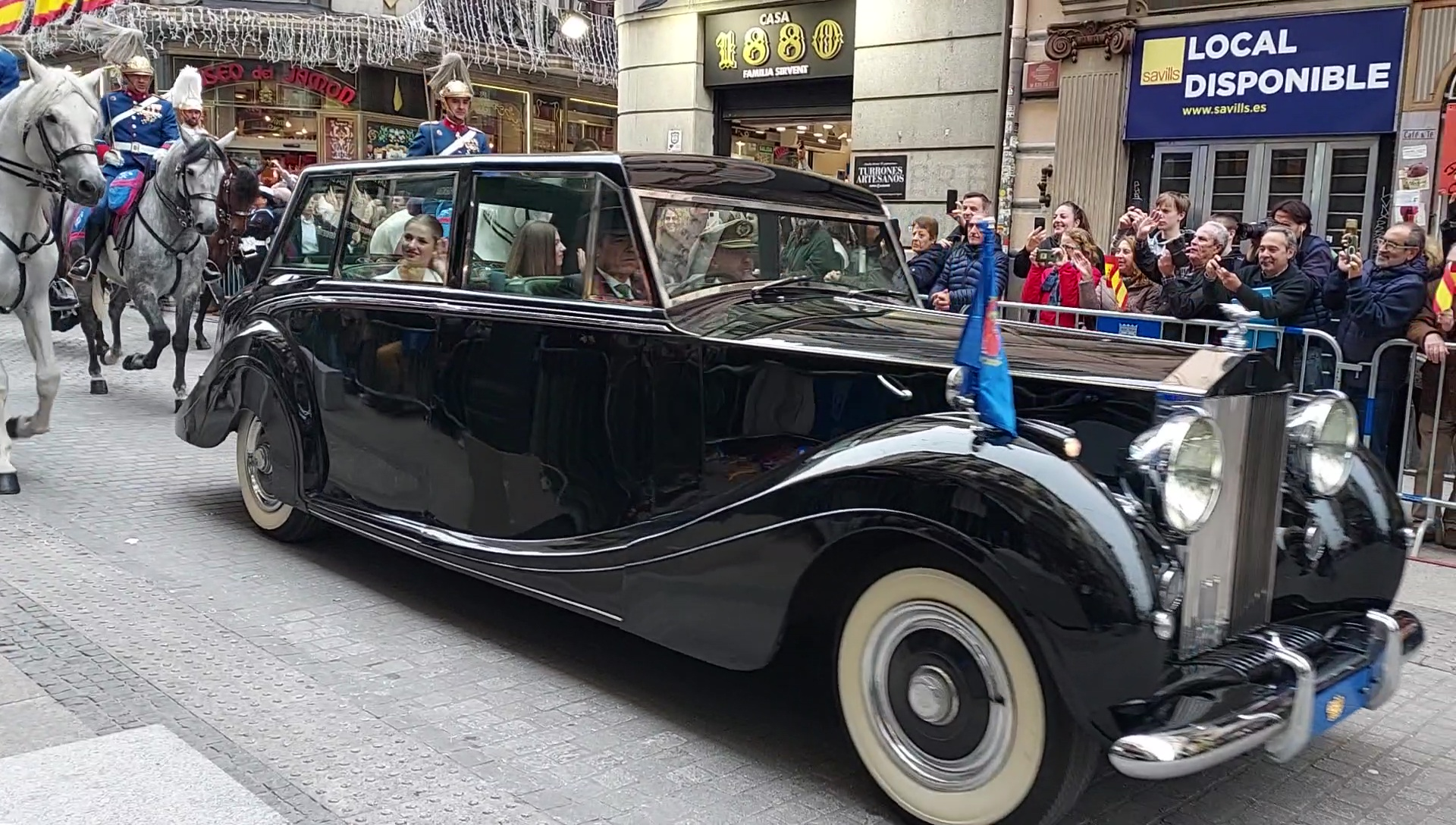
Princess Leonor in a Spanish royal family Rolls-Royce Phantom IV during her 18th birthday parade in October 2023.

On 22 September 2023, the Royal Household announced that, as required by the Spanish Constitution, Leonor would swear allegiance to the Constitution and the King upon reaching the age of majority. This declared her as the heir to the Spanish throne. At about 11:00 (CET) on 31 October 2023, her 18th birthday, the ceremony started when the royal family left the Palace of Zarzuela and was escorted by the Royal Guard through the streets of Madrid. At the Palacio de las Cortes the royal family received state honours, and the Princess of Asturias took her oath before a joint session of the Spanish Parliament which gave her an ovation lasting more than four minutes.

After this ceremony, the royal family and the main authorities of the country went to the Royal Palace, where her father, King Felipe, awarded her the Collar of the Order of Charles III, the highest civil honour in Spain. Following lunch at the palace, the institutional event concluded, and the royal family held a private celebration at the Royal Palace of El Pardo. The entire paternal and maternal family attended this private event, as well as the Greek royal family, represented by Queen Anne-Marie and Princess Alexia and her husband, some members of the House of Bourbon-Two Sicilies including Prince Pedro, Duke of Calabria, representatives of the Bulgarian royal family, and Princess Miriam Ghazi.

=== Official agenda ===
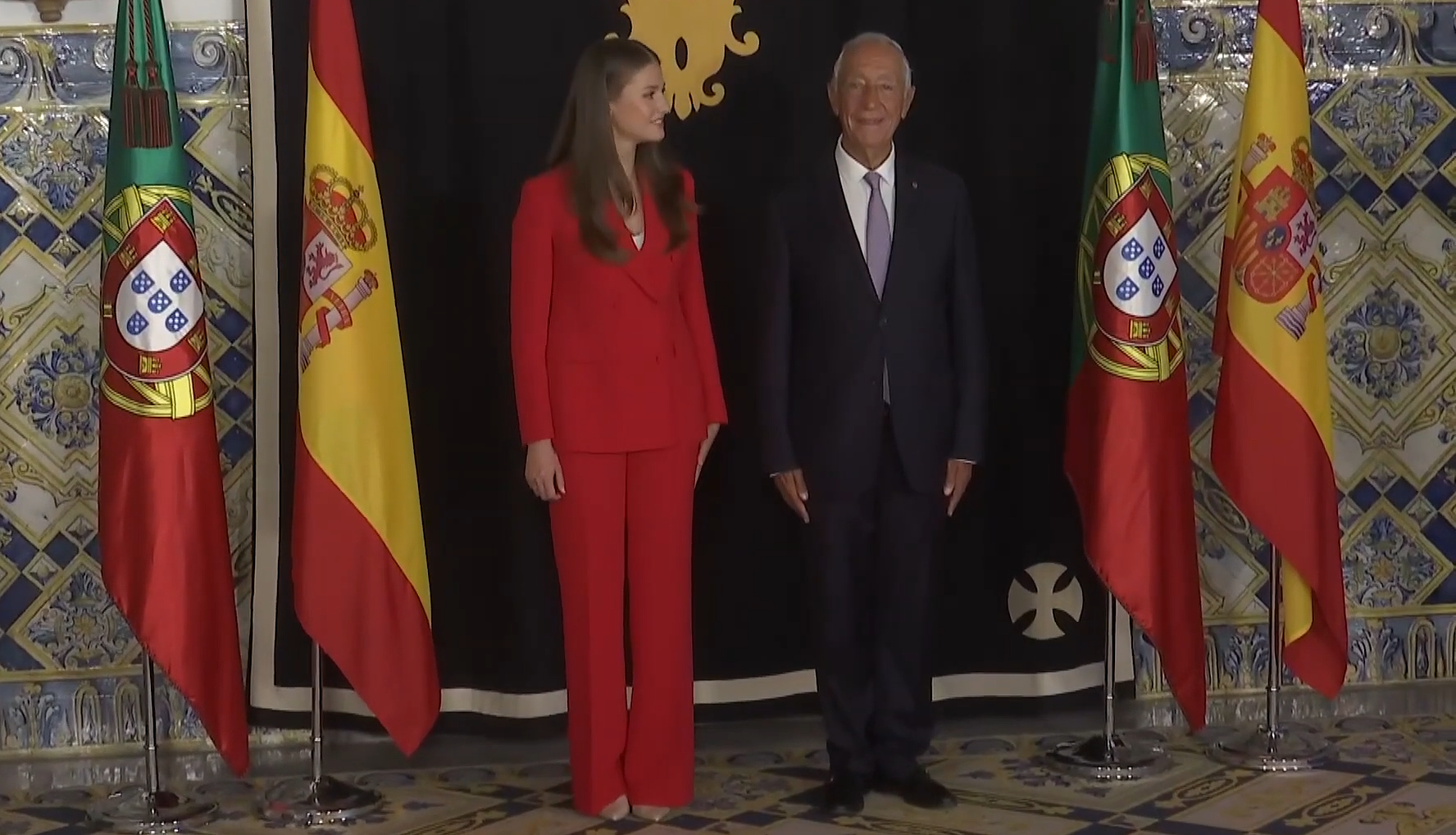
The Princess and the President of Portugal during her first state visit, 2024.

On 6 January 2024, Leonor attended the Pascua Militar for the first time, a more than two-centuries-old Spanish military celebration. She attended the event not just as the heir to her father, but also as member of the Armed Forces. In May 2024, she attended the commemoration of the 40th anniversary of the oath of allegiance to the Spanish flag of the 44th promotion of the General Military Academy.

On 12 July 2024, Leonor made her first official foreign visit, travelling to Portugal at the invitation of Portuguese president Marcelo Rebelo de Sousa. Accompanied by Rebelo de Sousa, Spanish foreign minister José Manuel Albares and the King's private secretary, Camilo Villarino, Leonor focused on environmental protection and ocean conservation, visiting the Lisbon Oceanarium and attending a debate on ocean protection. She also visited the Jerónimos Monastery, where she paid tribute to the poet Luís de Camões, and later went to Belém Palace, where delegations from both countries met and had lunch, and where President Rebelo de Sousa awarded Leonor the Grand Cross of the Military Order of Christ.

On 25 October 2024, she attended the Princess of Asturias Awards ceremony for the first time as an adult, being in charge of giving the speech to the winners and, later, declaring the event closed and convening the awards for its next edition. It was the sixth awards ceremony she attended.

In July 2025, Leonor and Infanta Sofía attended the UEFA Women’s Euro 2025 match between England and Spain.

On 4 August 2025, Leonor and Infanta Sofía attended the annual reception at Marivent Palace for authorities and prominent citizens of the Balearic Islands. The reception was also attended by King Felipe VI, Queen Letizia and Queen Sofía. It was the first time Leonor and Sofía had attended the reception.

From 26 to 27 September 2025, Leonor made an official visit to the Chartered Community of Navarre with her parents. The two-day visit marked the 600th anniversary of the title of Princess of Viana, one of the titles held by the heir to the Spanish throne as heir to the former Kingdom of Navarre. The royal family visited the towns of Pamplona, Viana and Tudela and some of their historic sites, such as the Monastery of Leyre and the Royal Palace of Olite.

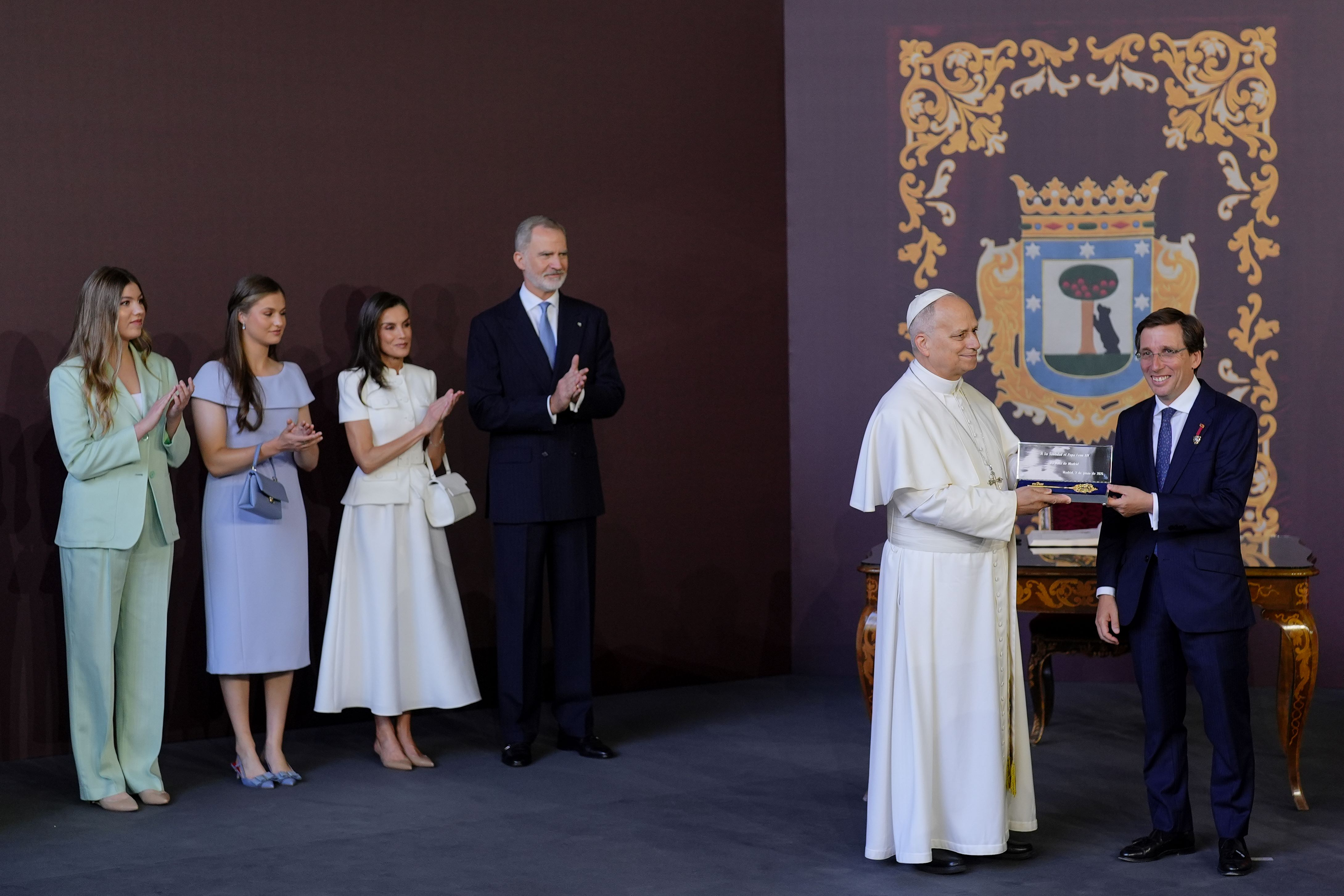
The royal family at the presentation of the Golden Key of Madrid to Pope Leo XIV

On 24 October 2025, she presided over the seventh edition of the Princess of Asturias Awards. In addition, she was the only one to deliver a speech at the Exemplary Town Award in Valdesoto.

On 30 May 2026, she attended her first Armed Forces Day in Vigo.

On 6 June 2026, Leonor and Infanta Sofía met Pope Leo XIV for the first time. The following day, they attended mass with him in the Plaza de Cibeles.

On 19 July 2026, Leonor attended the 2026 FIFA World Cup final against Argentina with her family and Prime Minister Pedro Sánchez.

== Titles, styles, honours and arms ==
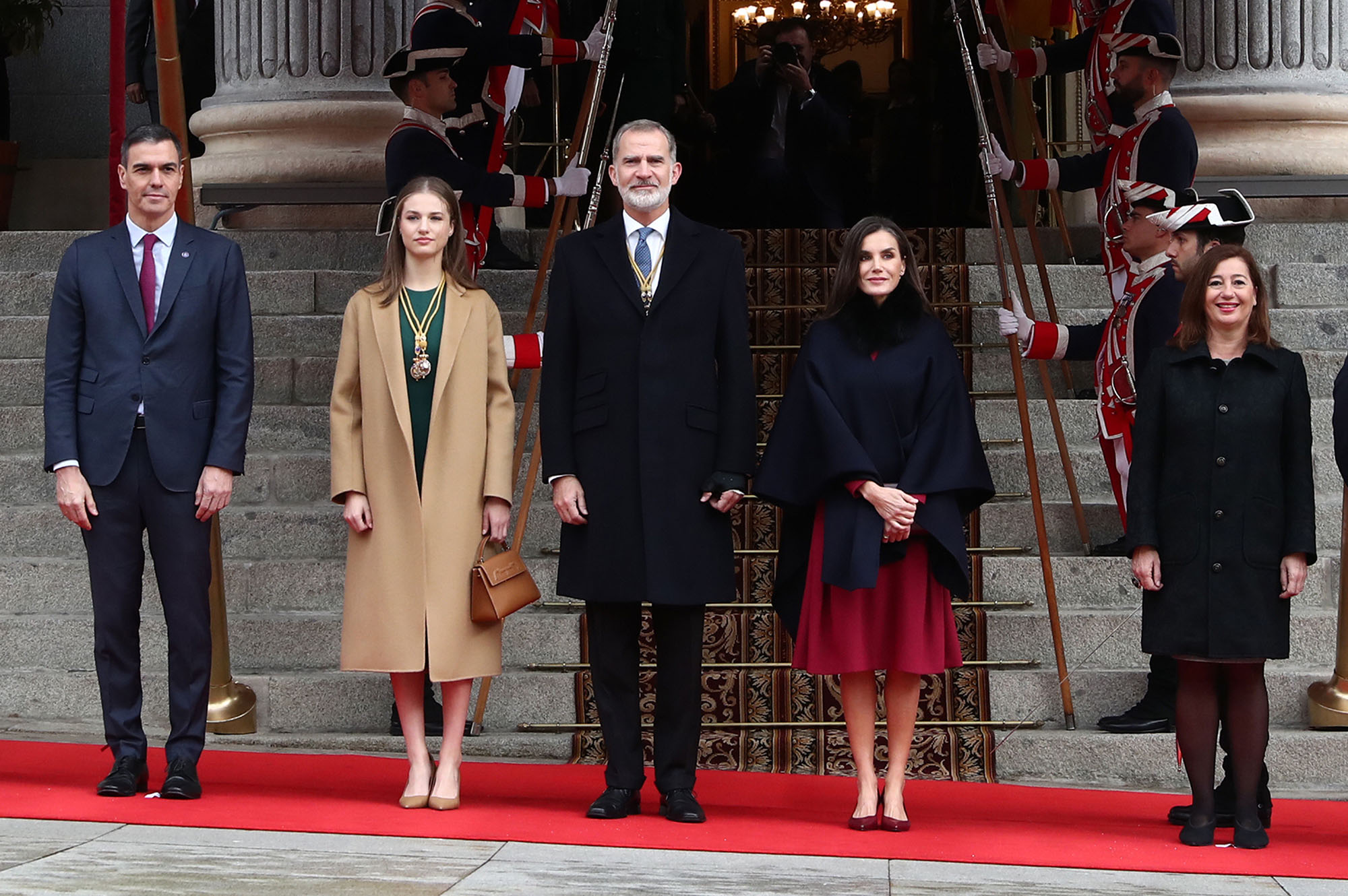
Princess Leonor and her parents with the prime minister (left) and the president of the Congress of Deputies (right) in November 2023.

As a daughter of the Prince of Asturias, Leonor was born an infanta and initially styled "Her Royal Highness Infanta Doña Leonor". Upon her father's accession to the throne, Leonor became the heir presumptive to the Spanish throne, and she inherited the traditional titles of the heir: Princess of Asturias, Princess of Girona, Princess of Viana, Duchess of Montblanc, Countess of Cervera and Lady of Balaguer. Leonor is the 36th person to bear the title of princess of Asturias since its creation in 1388.

Since then, Leonor is generally styled as "Her Royal Highness The Princess of Asturias", although depending on the province of the country, another title may be added. For example, when visiting the territories of the former Crown of Aragon, she is usually titled "Her Royal Highness the Princess of Asturias and Girona" and, in Navarre, she is referred to as "Her Royal Highness the Princess of Asturias and Viana".

=== Honours ===
As heir to the throne, she is the nominal chairwoman of the Princess of Asturias Foundation and the Princess of Girona Foundation. However, before she turned 18, those functions were assumed by her father.

As is traditional for the first in line to the throne, her father invested her with the insignia (Collar, Medal and Bow) of the Order of the Golden Fleece (awarded 30 October 2015, presented 30 January 2018). On 10 October 2023, she was created a Dame of the Collar of the Order of Charles III (10 October 2023, presented 31 October 2023). On 31 October 2023, the Congress of Deputies and the Senate granted her the Gold Medals of the Spanish parliament. On 2 July 2024, she was awarded a Grand Cross of Military Merit with White Decoration (presented 3 July 2024), and on 15 July 2025, she was awarded a Grand Cross of Naval Merit with White Decoration (presented 16 July 2025). On 12 July 2024, President of the Portuguese Republic Marcelo Rebelo de Sousa awarded her the Grand Cross of the Military Order of Christ. On 30 June 2026, she was awarded a Grand Cross of Aeronautical Merit with White Decoration (presented 10 July 2026).

=== Arms ===
Coat of arms of Leonor, Princess of Asturias
Notes In 2015, one day before the Princess of Asturias' birthday, she was granted the Order of the Golden Fleece. Since then, she has been able to use the coat of arms of the heir to the Spanish throne with the collar of the order. The government officially gazetted her use of the arms and standard by Royal Decree on her birthday. Adopted 2014 Crest The crown of the Princess of Asturias Escutcheon The arms are divided into four quarters, blazoned as follows: 1st, Gules a castle three-towered Or, masoned Sable ajoure Azure (for Castile); 2nd, Argent a lion rampant Purpure, armed Gules and crowned Or (for León); 3rd, Or four pallets Gules (for Aragon); 4th, Gules a cross, saltire and orle of chains all linked Or, an emerald Proper (for Navarre); Enté en point, Argent a pomegranate Proper seeded Gules, supported, sculpted and leafed in two leaves Vert (for Granada); Inescutcheon, Azure with three fleurs-de-lys Or, bordured Gules (for Bourbon). Other elements The whole is differenced by a blue label of three points azure. Banner The Princess' Standard comprises a light blue (the colour of the Flag of Asturias) square flag displaying the coat of arms of the heir to the Spanish throne in the centre.

=== Coins ===
On 31 October 2023, the Royal Mint of Spain minted a gold-silver coin which depicts Leonor, to commemorate her coming of age as an emblematic event. In 2025, a collector’s coin was made to commemorate her time in the Spanish Navy in her second year of her three year military training.

=== Other ===
A collector stamp was made in her honour alongside her father King Felipe, to commemorate 50 years since the end of the dictatorship of former leader Francisco Franco.

== See also ==
- Princess of Asturias Awards
- Politics of Spain

== Notes ==
Leonor, Princess of Asturias House of Bourbon Cadet branch of the Capetian dynasty Born: 31 October 2005
Spanish royalty
Preceded by Felipe	Princess of Asturias, Princess of Viana; Princess of Girona, Duchess of Montblanc, Countess of Cervera, Lady of Balaguer; 2014–present	Incumbent
Lines of succession
First Heir presumptive	Succession to the Spanish throne 1st in line	Followed by Infanta Sofía
