= List of titles and honours of Queen Letizia of Spain =

Royal monogram of Letizia as Queen of Spain

Letizia Ortiz Rocasolano has been the Queen of Spain since the accession of her husband, King Felipe VI, in 2014. She has received numerous titles, decorations, and honorary appointments as Princess of Asturias and as Queen of Spain.

== Styles and titles ==
Upon marrying Felipe, Letizia was styled "Her Royal Highness The Princess of Asturias", as consort of the Prince of Asturias, heir to the Spanish Crown. Likewise, Letizia had the right to use the other titles that belonged to Felipe as heir (these were those of Princess of Girona, Princess of Viana, Duchess of Montblanc, Countess of Cervera, and Lady of Balaguer).

After the accession of Felipe to the Spanish throne, Letizia became queen consort and was styled as "Her Majesty The Queen". In private conversations, the most correct thing is to address her initially as "Your Majesty" (Majestad) and, later, as "Madam" (Señora), but never as "You" (Tú or Usted).

== Honours ==
Country	Date	Appointment	Ribbon	Other
Spain	22 May 2004	Dame Grand Cross of the Royal and Distinguished Spanish Order of Charles III		
Spain	19 June 2014	De facto Grand Mistress of the Royal Order of Noble Ladies of Queen Maria Luisa		
Spain	21 November 2008	Dame of the Royal Cavalry Armory of Seville		
Argentina	9 February 2009	Grand Cross of the Order of the Liberator General San Martin		
Latvia	16 October 2004	Commander Grand Cross of the Order of the Three Stars		
Hungary	31 January 2005	Grand Cross of the Order of Merit of the Republic of Hungary		
Estonia	9 July 2007	Member 1st Class of the Order of the Cross of Terra Mariana		
Finland	6 Ottober 2026	Commander Grand Cross of the Order of the White Rose of Finland		
Portugal	25 September 2006	Grand Cross of the Military Order of Our Lord Jesus Christ		
Romania	26 November 2007	Grand Cross of the National Order of Faithful Service		
Chile	7 March 2011	Grand Cross of the Order of Merit		
Netherlands	30 April 2013	Recipient of the King Willem-Alexander Inauguration Medal		
Netherlands	15 October 2014	Grand Cross of the Order of the Crown		
Morocco	14 July 2014	Member Special Class of the Order of Muhammad		
Colombia	2 March 2015	Grand Cross Extraordinary of the Order of Boyaca		
Japan	5 April 2017	Grand Cordon (Paulownia) of the Order of the Precious Crown		
Portugal	18 April 2018	Grand Cross of the Order of Liberty		
South Korea	15 June 2021	Grand Gwanghwa Medal of the Order of Diplomatic Service Merit		
Italy	25 October 2021	Knight Grand Cross of the Order of Merit of the Italian Republic		
Sweden	24 November 2021	Member of the Royal Order of the Seraphim		
Germany	17 October 2022	Grand Cross Special Class of the Order of Merit of the Federal Republic of Germany		
Angola	7 February 2023	Recipient of the Order of Agostinho Neto		
Denmark	6 November 2023	Knight of the Order of the Elephant		
Netherlands	17 April 2024	Knight of the Order of the Gold Lion of the House of Nassau		
Egypt	17 September 2025	Member Supreme Class of the Order of the Virtues		
France	27 April 2009	Grand Cross of the Order of National Merit		
France	29 September 2026	Grand Cross of the Order of the Legion of Honour		
Lebanon	19 October 2009	Grand Cordon of the Order of Merit		
Mexico	29 June 2015	Sash of Special Category of the Mexican Order of the Aztec Eagle		
Oman	4 November 2025	First Class of the Civil Order of Oman		
Panama	24 October 2008	Grand Cross of the Order of Vasco Núñez de Balboa		
Peru	5 July 2004	Grand Cross of the Order of the Sun of Peru		
Peru	5 July 2015	Grand Cross of the Order of Merit for Distinguished Service		
Philippines	3 December 2007	Grand Cross of the Order of the Golden Heart		

== Honorific eponyms ==
- Spain
  - Elche, Alicante: Colegio de Educación Infantil y Primaria Princesa de Asturias (Infantile and Primary Education Public School Princess of Asturias)
  - Santander: Centro de Acogida Princesa Letizia (Reception Center Princess Letizia)

== Other honours ==
- Spain
  - Asociación Española contra el Cáncer y de su Fundación Científica (Spanish Association Against Cancer and of its Scientific Foundation): Honorary President
  - "Larra" Award for the most distinguished young journalist of the year, Madrid Press Association (2000)
  - Hija Adoptiva de Ribadesella (Adoptive Daughter of Ribadesella), Asturias (2004)
  - Hija Predilecta de Oviedo (Favourite Daughter of Oviedo), Asturias (2007)

== See also ==
- List of titles and honours of Felipe VI of Spain
- List of titles and honours of Juan Carlos I of Spain
- List of titles and honours of Queen Sofía of Spain
- List of titles and honours of Leonor, Princess of Asturias
- List of honours of the Spanish Royal Family by country
- List of titles and honours of the Spanish Crown

== Notes and references ==
- (in Spanish) H.R.H. the Princess of Asturias, Official site of the Royal Household of Spain.
