= List of titles and honours of Felipe VI =

The king's monogram

Felipe VI has received titles, decorations, and honorary appointments as monarch of Spain and before as heir apparent to the throne of Spain: his titles and styles are listed by precedence of rank, nobility, and honour.

== Titles and styles ==
Royal styles of King Felipe VI
- Reference style: His Majesty
- Spoken style: Your Majesty

- 30 January 1968 – 1 November 1977: His Royal Highness Infante Felipe of Spain
- 1 November 1977 – 19 June 2014: His Royal Highness The Prince of Asturias
  - In former Crown of Aragon territories: 22 January 1977 – 19 June 2014: His Royal Highness The Prince of Girona
  - In former Kingdom of Navarre territory: 22 January 1977 – 19 June 2014: His Royal Highness The Prince of Viana
  - He was also the Duke of Montblanc, Count of Cervera and Lord of Balaguer from 1977 to 2014.
- 19 June 2014 – present: His Majesty The King of Spain (Note: He may use other titles that correspond to the Crown.)

== Honours ==
Country	Date	Appointment	Ribbon	Other
Spain		21st Grand Master and 1,182nd Knight of the Spanish Order of the Golden Fleece		
Spain		Grand Master and Knight of the Collar of the Royal and Distinguished Spanish Order of Charles III		
Spain		De facto Sovereign of the Royal Order of Noble Ladies of Queen Maria Luisa		
Spain		Grand Master of the Royal Order of Isabella the Catholic		
Spain		Grand Master of the Royal Order of Civil Merit		
Spain		Grand Master of the Civil Order of Alfonso X, the Wise		
Spain		Grand Master of the Order of the Cross of St. Raymond of Peñafort		
Spain		Grand Master of the Order of Constitutional Merit		
Spain		Sovereign of the Royal and Military Order of St. Ferdinand		
Spain		Grand Master and Knight Grand Cross with White Decoration of the Order of Military Merit		
Spain		Grand Master and Knight Grand Cross with White Decoration of the Order of Naval Merit		
Spain		Grand Master and Knight Grand Cross with White Decoration of the Order of Aeronautical Merit		
Spain		Sovereign of the Royal and Military Order of Saint Hermenegild		
Spain		Grand Master of the Order of Merit of the Civil Guard		
Spain		Gold Cross of the Order of Merit of the Civil Guard		
Spain		Grand Master of the Royal Military Order of Calatrava		
Spain		Grand Master of the Royal Military Order of Santiago		
Spain		Grand Master of the Royal Military Order of Alcántara		
Spain		Grand Master of the Royal Military Order of Montesa		
Spain		Plus Ultra Medal (in gold) – INI.		
Dominican Republic	24 April 1987	Collar of the Order of Christopher Columbus		
Portugal	1988	Grand Cross of the Military Order of Christ		
United Kingdom	1988	Honorary Knight Grand Cross of the Royal Victorian Order		
Thailand	16 June 1989	Knight Grand Cordon (Special Class) of the Most Exalted Order of the White Elephant		
Portugal	1991	Grand Cross of the Military Order of Saint Benedict of Aviz		
Sweden	1991	Knight of the Royal Order of the Seraphim		
Philippines	2 April 1995	Grand Cross of the Order of Sikatuna		
Mexico	1996	Sash of the Mexican Order of the Aztec Eagle		
Sweden	1996	Recipient of the 50th Birthday Badge Medal of King Carl XVI Gustaf		
Portugal	1996	Grand Officer of the Ancient and Most Noble Military Order of the Tower and of the Sword, of the Valour, Loyalty and Merit		Promoted to Grand Cross in 2006
Italy	1996	Knight Grand Cross of the Order of Merit of the Italian Republic		Promoted to Knight Grand Cross with Collar in 2021
Finland	6 Ottober 2026	Commander Grand Cross with Collar of the Order of the White Rose of Finland		
Netherlands	2001	Knight Grand Cross of the Order of Orange-Nassau		
Germany	11 November 2002	Grand Cross 1st class of the Order of Merit of the Federal Republic of Germany		Promoted to Grand Cross Special Class in 2022
Poland	24 September 2003	Grand Cross of the Order of Merit of the Republic of Poland		
Portugal	25 September 2006	Grand Cross of the Ancient and Most Noble Military Order of the Tower and of the Sword, of the Valour, Loyalty and Merit		Promoted to Grand Collar in 2016
South Korea	2007	Grand Gwanghwa Medal of the Order of Diplomatic Service Merit		
Romania	2007	Grand Cross of the Order of the Star of Romania		
Philippines	2007	Grand Cross of the Order of Lakandula		
Netherlands	2013	Recipient of the King Willem-Alexander Inauguration Medal		
Mexico	26 June 2015	Collar of the Mexican Order of the Aztec Eagle		
Peru	26 June 2015	Grand Cross with Diamonds of the Order of the Sun of Peru		
Portugal	28 November 2016	Grand Collar of the Ancient and Most Noble Military Order of the Tower and of the Sword, of the Valour, Loyalty and Merit		
Saudi Arabia	2017	Collar of the Order of King Abdulaziz		
United Kingdom	2017	Stranger Knight Companion of the Most Noble Order of the Garter		
Portugal	2018	Grand Cross with Collar of the Order of Liberty		
(NATO) North Atlantic Treaty Organization	2018	Serge Lazareff Prize		
Peru	2018	Grand Cross of the Order of Merit for Distinguished Service		
South Korea	2021	Recipient of the Grand Order of Mugunghwa		
Italy	2021	Knight Grand Cross with Collar of the Order of Merit of the Italian Republic		
Sweden	2021	Collar of the Royal Order of the Seraphim		
Holy See	2022	Knight of the Collar of the Equestrian Order of the Holy Sepulchre of Jerusalem		
Germany	2022	Grand Cross Special Class of the Order of Merit of the Federal Republic of Germany		
Angola	2023	Recipient of the Order of Agostinho Neto		
(Kingdom of Italy) Italian Royal Family	2023	Knight of the Supreme Order of the Most Holy Annunciation		
Denmark	2023	Knight of the Order of the Elephant		
Netherlands	2024	Knight Grand Cross of the Order of the Netherlands Lion		
Egypt	2025	Collar of the Order of the Nile		
Oman	4 November 2025	Collar of the Order of Al Said		
Argentina		Grand Cross of the Order of May of Military Merit		
Argentina		Collar of the Order of the Liberator General San Martín		
Austria		Grand Decoration of Honour in Gold with Sash for Services to the Republic of Austria		
Belgium		Grand Cordon of the Order of Leopold		
Brazil		Grand Cross of the National Order of the Southern Cross		
Chile		Grand Cross with Collar of the Order of Merit		
Colombia		Grand Collar of the Order of Boyaca		
Ecuador		Grand Cross of the National Order of San Lorenzo		
El Salvador		Grand Cross with Gold Star of the National Order of José Matías Delgado		
Estonia		Member 1st Class of the Order of the Cross of Terra Mariana		
France		Grand Cross of the National Order of the Legion of Honour		
France		Grand Cross of the National Order of Merit		
Greece		Grand Cross of the Order of the Redeemer		
Honduras		Grand Cross of the Order of Francisco Morazán		
Hungary		Grand Cross of the Order of Merit of the Republic of Hungary		
Japan		Collar of the Supreme Order of the Chrysanthemum		
Jordan		Grand Cordon of the Supreme Order of the Renaissance		
Latvia		Commander Grand Cross of the Order of the Three Stars		
Lebanon		Grand Cordon of the Order of Merit		
Luxembourg		Grand Cross of the Order of Civil and Military Merit of Adolph of Nassau		
Morocco		Member Special Class of the Order of Muhammad		
Norway		Grand Cross of the Royal Norwegian Order of Saint Olav		
Panama		Grand Cross Extraordinary of the Order of Vasco Núñez de Balboa		

== Honorific eponyms ==
- Spain
  - Cáceres: Estadio Príncipe Felipe (Prince Felipe Stadium)
  - Oviedo: Auditorio-Palacio de Congresos de Oviedo Príncipe Felipe (Prince Felipe Auditorium and Congress Palace of Oviedo)
  - Valencia: Prince Felipe Museum of Sciences
  - Valencia: Centro de Investigación Príncipe Felipe, CIPF (Prince Felipe Research Centre)
  - Zaragoza: Prince Felipe Arena
  - Spanish aircraft carrier Príncipe de Asturias (R-11) (Spanish aircraft carrier Prince of Asturias)
- USA
  - Washington, D.C.: Prince of Asturias Chair in Spanish Studies in the Edmund A. Walsh School of Foreign Service, Georgetown University
  - World Peace & Liberty Award
  - New York City: Foreign Policy Association Medal

== Other honours ==
- Holy See
  - Basilica di Santa Maria Maggiore: Protocanon (ex officio) 19 June 2014 – present
  - Basilica di San Paolo fuori le Mura: Protocanon (ex officio) 19 June 2014 – present
- International Olympic Committee: Recipient of the Gold Olympic Order (18 December 2013)
- Honorary President of the Organization of Ibero-American States (2014)
- "Masonic Order of the Founder" medal with red insignia awarded by the Grand Lodge of Spain (2019)

=== Scholastic ===
Spanish Royal Academies

- Spanish Royal Academies Board: High Patron (ex officio) 19 June 2014 – present

== Military ranks ==
- 28 May 1977 – 1 August 1985: Honorary soldier of the 1st King's Inmemorial Infantry Regiment

Spanish Army

- : 1 August 1985 – 7 July 1986: Officer Cadet, Spanish Army
- : 7 July 1986 – 7 July 1989: Cadet Ensign, Spanish Army
- : 7 July 1989 – 1 December 2000: Lieutenant, Spanish Army
- : 1 December 2000 – 3 July 2009: Commandant, Spanish Army
- : 3 July 2009 – 19 June 2014: Lieutenant Colonel, Spanish Army

Spanish Navy

- : 10 July 1986 – 7 July 1989: Midshipman, Spanish Navy
- : 7 July 1989 – 1 December 2000: Ensign, Spanish Navy
- : 1 December 2000 – 3 July 2009: Corvette Captain, Spanish Navy
- : 3 July 2009 – 19 June 2014: Frigate Captain, Spanish Navy

Spanish Air and Space Force

- : 10 July 1987 – 7 July 1989: Cadet Ensign, Spanish Air Force
- : 7 July 1989 – 1 December 2000: Lieutenant, Spanish Air Force
  18 March 1996: Qualified Helicopter Pilot, 402 Training Squadron, Spanish Air Force
- : 1 December 2000 – 3 July 2009: Commandant, Spanish Air Force
- : 3 July 2009 – 19 June 2014: Lieutenant Colonel, Spanish Air Force

Spanish Armed Forces

- : 19 June 2014 – present: Captain General of the Spanish Armed Forces

== Wear of orders, decorations and medals ==
The ribbons worn regularly by His Majesty in undress uniform are as follows:

Ribbons of Felipe VI

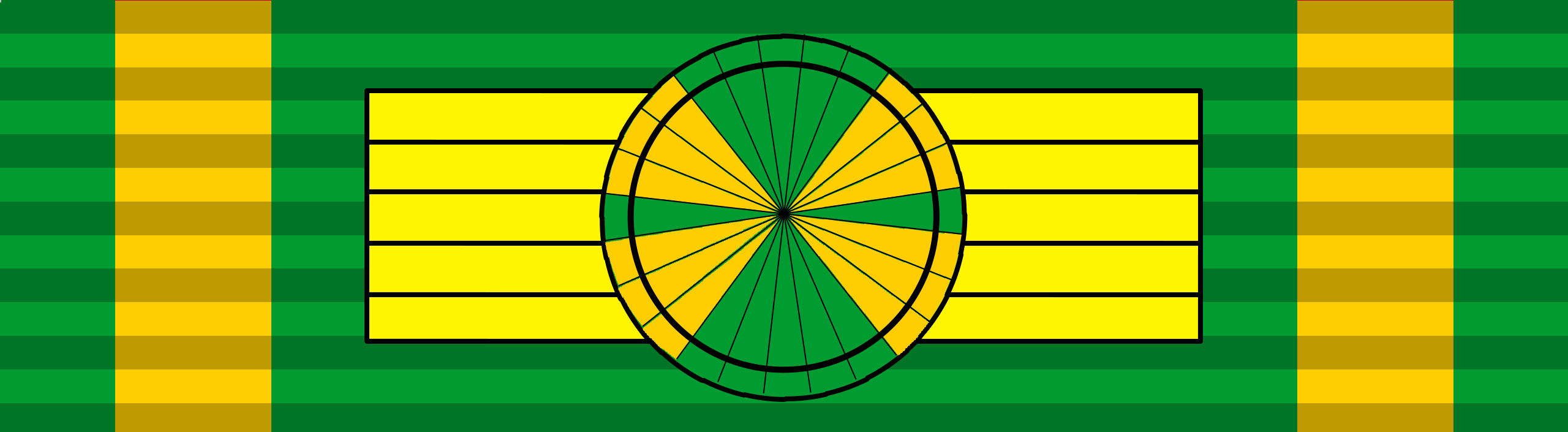

== See also ==
- List of titles and honours of Queen Letizia of Spain
- List of titles and honours of Juan Carlos I of Spain
- List of titles and honours of Queen Sofía of Spain
- List of titles and honours of Leonor, Princess of Asturias
- List of titles and honours of the Spanish Crown
- List of honours of the Spanish Royal Family by country
