= List of princesses of Asturias by marriage =

This is a list of women who held the title Princess of Asturias (Spanish: Princesa de Asturias, Asturian: Princesa d'Asturies) by marriage.

The title was created in 1388 for the future Henry III of Castile and Catherine of Lancaster. A part of the pact ("Accord of Bayonne") was to grant the young couple the title of Prince and Princess of Asturias, which was modelled after that of Prince of Wales in the Kingdom of England. The title was to belong to the official successor of the Castilian throne. Thus the first holder of the princedom was the young Henry of Castile and the first woman to hold the title by marriage was his wife, Catherine of Lancaster.

Leonor, Princess of Asturias, elder daughter of King Felipe VI of Spain, holds the title in her own right, and not by marriage, as she is the heiress presumptive to the Spanish crown.

== Princess of Asturias ==
This is a list of princesses of Asturias who held the title by their marriage to the prince of Asturias:

| Picture | Name | Birth | Marriage | Became princess | Ceased to be princess | Death | Spouse |
|---|---|---|---|---|---|---|---|
| | Catherine of Lancaster | 31 March 1373 | 17 September 1388 | | 9 October 1390 became queen | 2 June 1418 | Henry (III) |
| | Blanche II of Navarre | 4 June 1424 | 16 October 1440 | | 27 July 1453 divorce | 2 December 1464 | Henry (IV) |
| | Margaret of Austria | 10 January 1480 | 3 April 1497 | | 4 October 1497 husband's death | 1 December 1530 | John |
| | Maria Manuela of Portugal | 15 October 1527 | 15 November 1543 | | 12 July 1545 | | Philip (II) |
| | Mary I of England | 18 February 1516 | 25 July 1554 | | 16 January 1556 became queen | 17 November 1558 | Philip (II) |
| | Elisabeth of France | 22 November 1602 | 25 November 1615 | | 31 March 1621 became queen | 6 October 1644 | Philip (IV) |
| | Louise Élisabeth d'Orléans | 11 December 1709 | 20 January 1722 | | 14 January 1724 became queen | 16 June 1742 | Louis |
| | Barbara of Portugal | 4 December 1711 | 20 January 1729 | | 9 July 1746 became queen | 27 August 1758 | Ferdinand (VI) |
| | Maria Luisa of Parma | 9 December 1751 | 4 September 1765 | | 14 December 1788 became queen | 2 January 1819 | Charles (IV) |
| | Maria Antonia of Sicily | 14 December 1784 | 4 October 1802 | | 21 May 1806 | | Ferdinand (VII) |
| | Letizia Ortiz Rocasolano | 15 September 1972 | 22 May 2004 | | 19 June 2014 became queen | - | Felipe (VI) |

== See also ==
- List of Asturian consorts
- Princess of Girona
- Princess of Viana
- Duchess of Montblanc
- Countess of Cervera
- Duchess of Calabria
