= List of titles and honours of Queen Sofía of Spain =

Queen Sofía of Spain has received numerous titles, decorations, and honorary appointments, both during and before her time as consort to King Juan Carlos I. Each is listed below. Where two dates are shown, the first indicates the date of receiving the award or title and the second indicates the date of its loss, renunciation or when its use was discontinued.

== Royal titles and styles ==
Styles of Queen Sofía of Spain
- Reference style: Her Majesty
- Spoken style: Your Majesty

Born as Princess Sophia of Greece and Denmark, she was the eldest daughter of King Paul of Greece and Queen Frederica, and a member of both the Greek and Danish royal families by descent. Her marriage to then-Prince Juan Carlos of Spain in 1962 marked her entry into the Spanish royal family. As the wife of the heir-designate to General Franco's regime, she assumed the title Princess of Spain—a title created specifically for her husband as designated successor to Franco. When Juan Carlos became King of Spain in 1975, following Franco's death, Sophia became queen consort of Spain.

Following her husband's abdication in 2014, she retained the style Her Majesty and continues to be known as Queen Sofía in honorific and official contexts.

- 2 November 1938 – 14 May 1962: Her Royal Highness Princess Sophia of Greece and Denmark
- 14 May 1962 - 21 July 1969: Her Royal Highness The Princess of Asturias (titular)
- 21 July 1969 – 22 November 1975: Her Royal Highness The Princess of Spain
- 22 November 1975 – 19 June 2014: Her Majesty The Queen of Spain
- 19 June 2014 – present: Her Majesty Queen Sofía of Spain

== Honours ==
Country	Appointment	Ribbon	Other
(Kingdom of Greece) Greek Royal Family	Dame Grand Cross of the Royal Order of Saints Olga and Sophia		
(Kingdom of Greece) Greek Royal Family	Recipient of the Commemorative Badge of the Centenary of the Royal House of Greece		
Spain	Collar of the Distinguished Order of the Golden Fleece		
Spain	Dame of the Collar of the Royal and Distinguished Spanish Order of Charles III		
Spain	11th Former Grand Mistress and 1,193rd Dame of the Royal Order of Noble Ladies of Queen Maria Luisa		
Spain	Recipient of the Spanish Red Cross Medal		
Argentina	Grand Cross of the Order of the Liberator General San Martín		
Austria	Grand Star of the Decoration of Honour for Services to the Republic of Austria		
Belgium	Grand Cordon of the Order of Leopold		
Brazil	Grand Cross of the National Order of the Southern Cross		
Chile	Grand Cross of the Order of Merit		
Colombia	Grand Cross Extraordinary of the Order of Boyacá		
Colombia	Grand Cross of the Order of San Carlos		
Costa Rica	Grand Cross of the Order of Juan Mora Fernández		
Denmark	Knight of the Order of the Elephant		
Dominican Republic	Grand Cross with Gold Breast Star of the Order of Merit of Duarte, Sánchez and Mella		
Ecuador	Grand Cross of the National Order of San Lorenzo		
Egypt	Member Supreme Class of the Order of the Virtues		
El Salvador	Grand Cross with Silver Plaque of the Order of José Matías Delgado		
Estonia	Member 1st Class of the Order of the Cross of Terra Mariana		
(Ethiopia) Ethiopian Imperial Family	Dame Grand Cordon with Collar of the Order of the Queen of Sheba		
Finland	Grand Cross with Collar of the Order of the White Rose of Finland		
France	Grand Cross of the National Order of the Legion of Honour		
France	Grand Cross of the Order of the National Merit		
Germany	Grand Cross Special Class of the Order of Merit of the Federal Republic of Germany		
Greece	Grand Cross of the Order of the Redeemer		
Guatemala	Grand Cross of the Order of the Quetzal		
Holy See	Dame of the Collar of the Equestrian Order of the Holy Sepulchre of Jerusalem		
Holy See	Recipient of the For Church and Pope Badge Medal		
Holy See	Recipient of the Benemerenti Medal		
Honduras	Grand Cross of the Order of Francisco Morazán		
Hungary	Grand Cross of the Order of Merit of the Republic of Hungary		
Iceland	Grand Cross of the Order of the Falcon		
Indonesia	1st Class of the Star of Mahaputera		
(Iran) Iranian Imperial Family	Member 1st Class of the Order of the Pleiades		
(Iran) Iranian Imperial Family	Recipient of the Commemorative Medal of the 2,500 year Celebration of the Persian Empire		
Italy	Knight Grand Cross of the Order of Merit of the Italian Republic		
(Kingdom of the Two Sicilies) Calabrian Royal Family of Two Sicilies	Dame Grand Cross of Justice of the Two Sicilian Sacred Military Constantinian Order of Saint George		
Jamaica	Honorary Member of the Order of Jamaica		
Japan	Grand Cordon (Paulownia) of the Order of the Precious Crown		
Jordan	Grand Cordon with Brilliants (Special 1st Class) of the Supreme Order of the Renaissance		
Jordan	Grand Cordon of the Order of the Star of Jordan		
Latvia	Commander Grand Cross with Chain of the Order of the Three Stars		
Lebanon	Grand Cross of the Order of Merit		
Lithuania	Grand Cross of the Order of Vytautas the Great		
Luxembourg	Knight of the Order of the Gold Lion of the House of Nassau		
Malta	Honorary Member of the Xirka Ġieħ ir-Repubblika		
Mexico	Sash of Special Category of the Mexican Order of the Aztec Eagle		
Morocco	Member Special Class of the Order of Muhammad		
(Kingdom of Nepal) Nepalese Royal Family	Member of the Order of the Benevolent Ruler		
Netherlands	Knight Grand Cross of the Order of the Netherlands Lion		
Netherlands	Recipient of the Wedding Medal of Princess Beatrix, Princess of Orange and Claus Van Amsberg		
Nigeria	Grand Commander of the Order of the Niger		
Norway	Grand Cross of the Royal Norwegian Order of Saint Olav		
Panama	Grand Cross Extraordinary of the Order of Vasco Núñez de Balboa		
Peru	Grand Cross of the Order of the Sun of Peru		
Philippines	Member of the Order of Gabriela Silang		
Philippines	Grand Collar of the Order of the Golden Heart		
Poland	Knight of the Order of the White Eagle		
Portugal	Grand Cross of the Military Order of Christ		
Portugal	Grand Cross of the Military Order of Saint James of the Sword		
Portugal	Grand Cross of the Order of Prince Henry		
Romania	Grand Cross of the Order of the Star of Romania		
Slovakia	Grand Cross of the Order of the White Double Cross		
South Africa	Grand Cross of the Order of Good Hope		
South Korea	Member of the Grand Order of Mugunghwa		
Sweden	Member of the Royal Order of the Seraphim		
Sweden	Recipient of the 50th Birthday Badge Medal of King Carl XVI Gustaf		
Thailand	Dame of the Most Illustrious Order of the Royal House of Chakri		
Thailand	Dame Grand Cross of the Most Illustrious Order of Chula Chom Klao		
Uruguay	Medal of the Oriental Republic of Uruguay		
Venezuela	Grand Cross of the Order of the Liberator		
Yugoslavia	Order of the Yugoslav Star with Sash		
Zaire	Grand Cross of the National Order of the Leopard		

== Regional and local ==
- Balearic Islands:
  - Gold Medal of the Autonomous Community (2024).

== Honorific eponyms ==
- Spain
  - Córdoba: Hospital Universitario Reina Sofía (University Hospital Queen Sofia)
  - Murcia: Hospital Reina Sofía (Hospital Queen Sofia)
  - Granada: Conservatorio Profesional de Danza Reina Sofía
  - Tudela: Hospital Reina Sofia (Hospital Queen Sofia)
  - Madrid: Museo Nacional Centro de Arte Reina Sofía (Queen Sofia National Museum and Art Center)
  - Madrid: Escuela Superior de Música Reina Sofía (Queen Sofia College of Music)
  - Tenerife: Tenerife South–Queen Sofía Airport
  - Spanish frigate Queen Sofía (F84)
- Philippines
  - Manila: Queen Sofia Hall – National Museum of Fine Arts
- USA
  - New York City: Queen Sofía Spanish Institute
- Antarctica
  - South Shetland Islands: Mount Reina Sofía (Mount Queen Sofia) on Livingston Island

== Other ==
- Spain
  - Fundación Reina Sofía (Queen Sofía's Foundation): President (1977 – Present)
  - Fundación de Ayuda contra la Drogadicción (Spanish Foundation of Aid against Drug Addiction): Honorary President (1986–2015).
  - Real Patronato sobre Discapacidad (Spanish Royal Board on Disability): Honorary President (1986–2015).

=== Scholastic ===
Queen Sofía has been the recipient of numerous honorary doctorates including:

- Spain
  - University of Valladolid
  - University of Las Palmas de Gran Canaria
- Colombia
  - Rosario University
- Japan
  - Tokyo: University of Seinen
- Portugal
  - University of Évora
- UK
  - University of Cambridge
  - University of Oxford
- USA
  - Georgetown University
  - Downtown San Antonio, Texas: St. Mary's University
  - State University of New York

Spanish Royal Academies

- Real Academia de Bellas Artes de San Fernando (Royal Academy of Fine Arts of St. Ferdinand): Honorary Member
- Real Academia de la Historia (Royal Academy of History): Honorary Member

== See also ==
- List of titles and honours of Juan Carlos I of Spain
- List of titles and honours of Felipe VI of Spain
- List of titles and honours of Queen Letizia of Spain
- List of titles and honours of Leonor, Princess of Asturias
- List of honours of the Spanish Royal Family by country
- List of titles and honours of the Spanish Crown
