= John, Prince of Asturias =

Son of Ferdinand II of Aragon and Isabella I of Castile (1478–1497)

John
- Prince of Asturias, Prince of Girona, Duke of Montblanc, Count of Cervera, and Lord of Balaguer
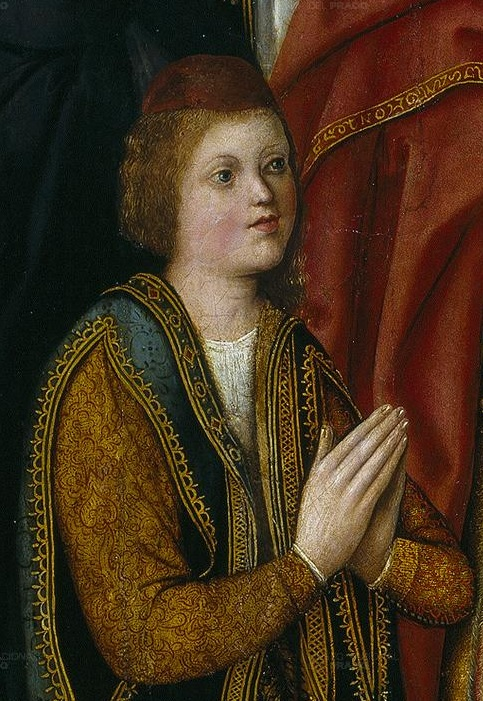
- Detail from the Madonna of the Catholic Monarchs, c. 1491–93
- Born: 30 June 1478; Seville, Spain
- Died: 4 October 1497 (aged 19); Salamanca, Spain
- Burial: Real Monasterio de Santo Tomás in Ávila
- Spouse: Margaret of Austria (m. 1497)
- House: Trastámara
- Father: Ferdinand II of Aragon
- Mother: Isabella I of Castile

John, Prince of Asturias and Girona (Spanish: Juan; 30 June 1478 – 4 October 1497) was the only son of King Ferdinand II of Aragon and Queen Isabella I of Castile, and heir apparent to both their thrones for nearly his entire life. Despite having this title throughout his life, he later died of tuberculosis and the title was given to various people, but later ended up going to Joanna I of Castile.

== Early life ==
The only son of the Catholic Monarchs, John was born in Seville on 30 June 1478. At the time, his parents were involved in the War of Castilian Succession against Isabella's niece Juana la Beltraneja, wife of King Afonso V of Portugal.

Coat of arms of John, Prince of Asturias and Girona.

John's birth helped consolidate Isabella's position as a sovereign. At the time of his birth, he had one elder sister Isabella; his younger sisters were Joanna, Maria, and Catherine.

The Catholic monarchs won the war against the King and Queen of Portugal. To negotiate a peace settlement with Isabella, King Afonso sent Infanta Beatrice, Duchess of Viseu. The two women met in March 1479. Beatrice was Afonso's sister-in-law and Isabella's maternal aunt. By terms of the treaty they eventually negotiated, the former Queen of Portugal (her marriage having been annulled by the Pope) was given two options: she could either wed Prince John, waiting 13 or 14 years until the prince was old enough to be married (by which time Joanna herself would be at least thirty) or she could enter a convent; either way she was to give up her claim to the throne.

== Childhood ==
Isabella I was quite an attentive mother for such a busy queen. John, being her only son and of delicate health, was doted on, and she referred to him affectionately as 'my angel' even when he was being reprimanded by her. Isabella and Ferdinand attempted to ensure the sickly prince's well-being through prayer, charity, and careful oversight of his health. John's wetnurses were Maria de Guzman, a member of the powerful Spanish House of Mendoza, and Juana de Torres. The latter stayed by the prince's side well into his adolescence, possibly as a result of his frail health.

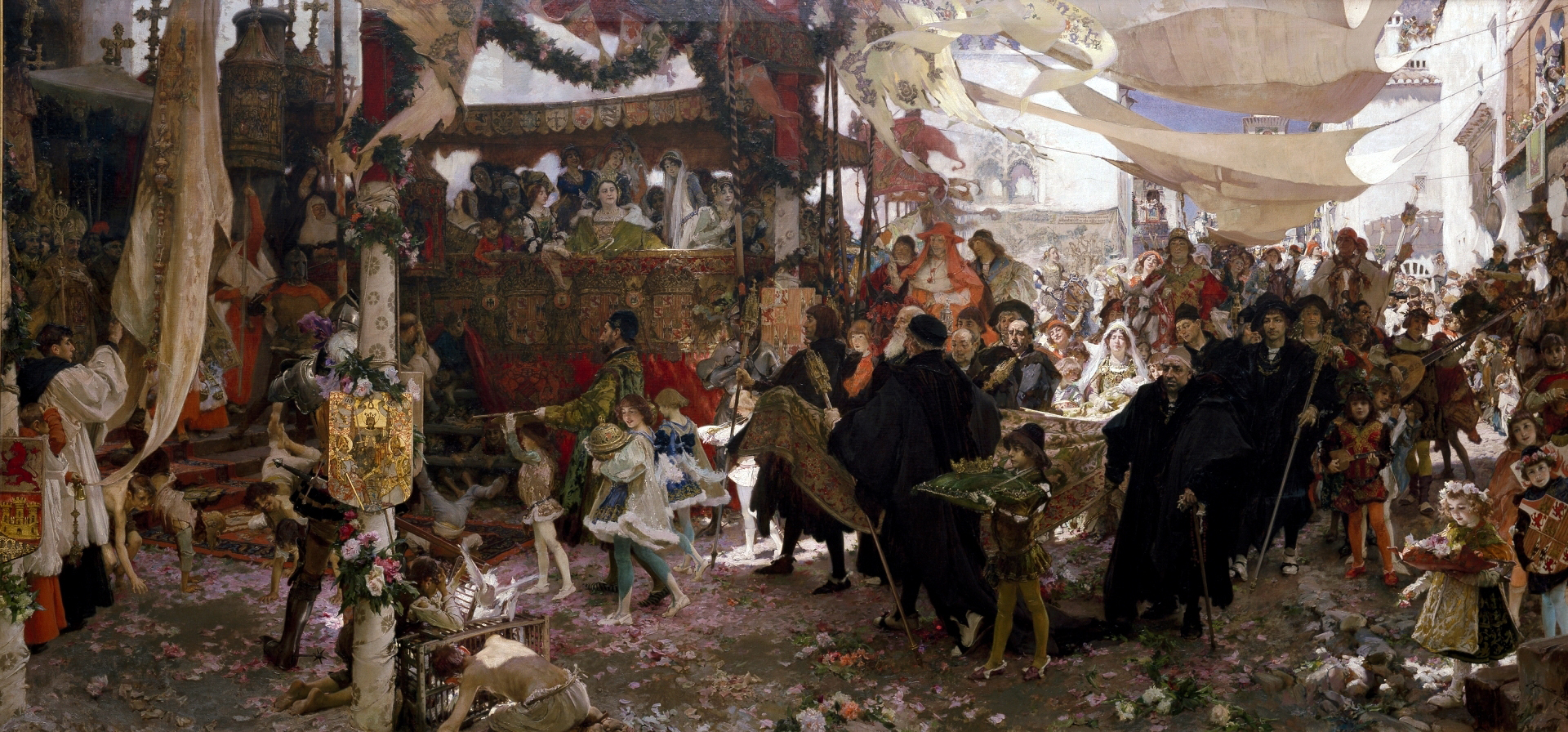
Francisco Pradilla Ortiz's painting Retinue of the Baptism of Don Juan, son of the Catholic Monarchs, Along the Streets of Seville, 1910

John's paternal grandfather, King John II of Aragon, took close interest in the infant prince; he warned his son Ferdinand that the prince should not be tutored under one grandee, a member of the nobility, as they would have far too much influence over the boy.

In 1492, Columbus named the newly discovered island of Cuba as Isla Juana in deference to Prince John, at that time the heir apparent. In 1494, Columbus's sons, Diego and Ferdinand, were brought to court to serve as John's pages.

== Education ==
As the sole male heir of the Catholic Monarchs, John received a rigorous education tailored to prepare him for his future role as a ruler. It combined traditional religious and moral instruction with the progressive influence of Renaissance humanism, emphasizing religious, moral, and intellectual development, in line with the values of his parents and the responsibilities he was expected to inherit.

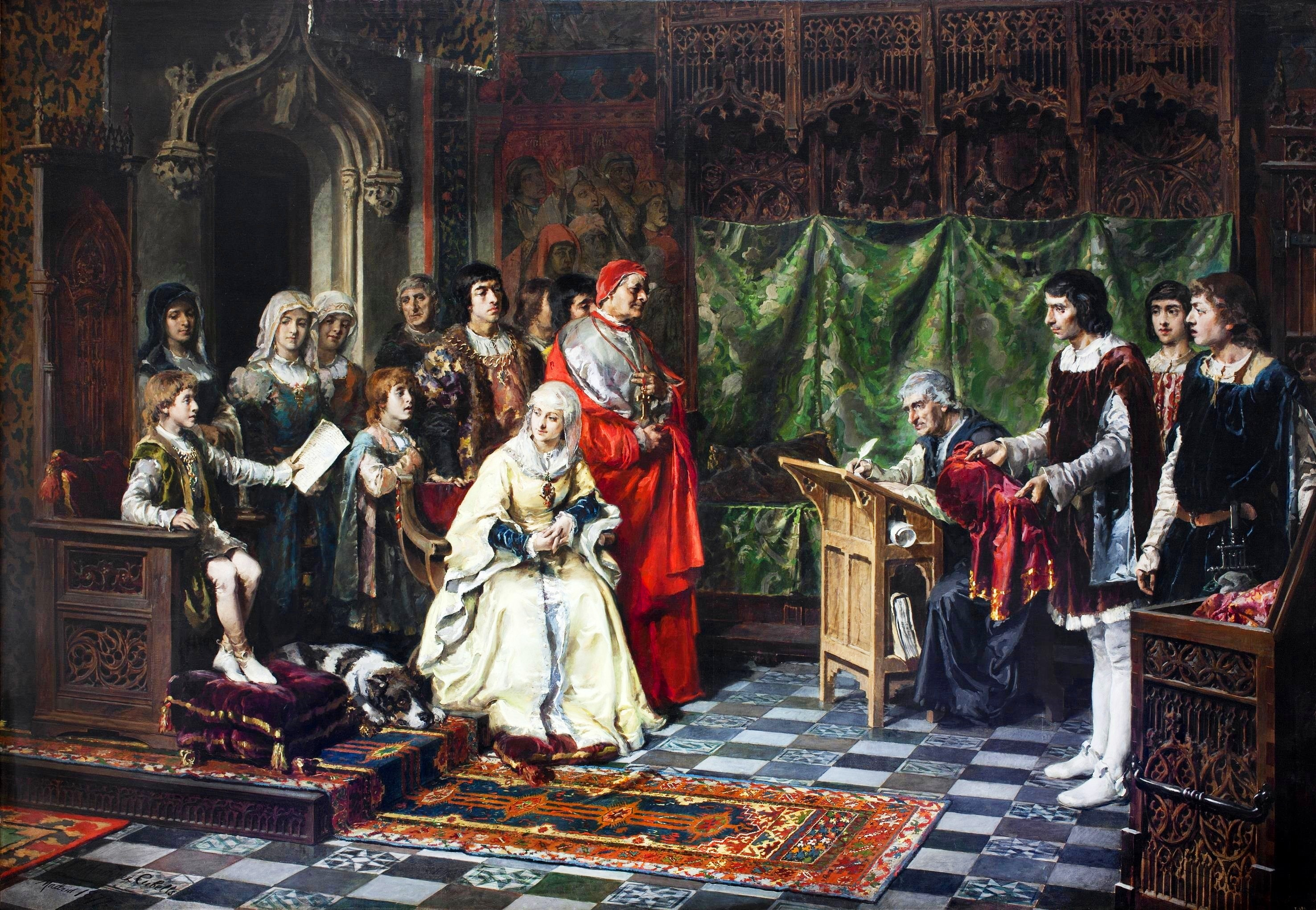
Education of Prince John (1877) by Salvador Martínez Cubells. This painting depicts the critical early education of John, Prince of Asturias, under Queen Isabella I and Cardinal Cisneros, emphasizing the preparation of the sole male heir for uniting Aragón and Castile.

From an early age, John’s education was overseen by prominent scholars and religious figures. His first preceptor was the Dominican friar Diego de Deza, a distinguished theologian who later became the Bishop of Salamanca and Inquisitor General of Spain. Under Deza’s guidance, John was instructed in Latin and theology, with a strong emphasis on Christian doctrine.

In 1492, Queen Isabella appointed the Italian humanist Peter Martyr d'Anghiera as John's personal tutor. Martyr introduced the prince to the principles of humanism, broadening his education to include classical studies.

When John was 13 years old, Isabella invited the sons of aristocrats, including future notable figures such as Nicolás de Ovando y Cáceres and Gonzalo Fernández de Oviedo y Valdés, to live at the royal court. This arrangement was designed to prevent John from becoming coddled or willful by surrounding him with peers who could serve as role models and companions.

John’s daily routine reflected the structured nature of his upbringing. His mornings began with dressing and grooming by attendants, followed by prayer and religious study under his preceptor’s supervision. After attending Mass, he received academic lessons. John was educated in various disciplines, including riding, jousting, and hunting. He demonstrated a talent for music, mastering instruments like the flute and clavichord.

== Marriage plans ==
During his early years, Isabella and Ferdinand considered Princess Catherine of York, a daughter of King Edward IV of England and his wife Elizabeth Woodville, as a potential wife for John. Although a marriage contract was signed in 1478, the union never took place. Other proposed candidates were Anne of Brittany and Catherine of Navarre.

In 1494, King Charles VIII of France laid claim to the throne of Naples and launched an invasion of Italy. Because Naples belonged to a lesser branch of the House of Trastámara, his invasion directly threatened Aragonese interests. This prompted King Ferdinand to began building a coalition, known as the Holy League, against France. Seeking Emperor Maximilian I's participation, Ferdinand engaged in negotiations for dynastic marriages between the Habsburg and Spanish royal families, aiming to seal the prospective alliance between the Holy Roman Empire and Spain.

On 20 January 1495 in Antwerp, terms for a double marriage were agreed on: John would marry Maximilian I's daughter, Archduchess Margaret of Austria, and his sister, the Infanta Joanna, would marry Maximilian's son, Archduke Philip the Handsome. The agreement was officially ratified on 5 November in Malines.

== Marriage ==
Infanta Joanna sailed from Spain to marry Philip the Handsome in late 1496, accompanied by a grand fleet. The same fleet returned months later carrying Philip's sister, Margaret of Austria. Margaret, aged sixteen, had already been betrothed once to Charles VIII, but the marriage treaty was renounced. Her engagement to the Prince of Asturias seemed doomed when the ship carrying her to Spain hit a storm in the Bay of Biscay. In haste, she wrote her own epitaph, in English, should she not reach Spain.

"Here lies Margaret, the willing bride,
Twice married – but a virgin when she died."

However, Margaret arrived in Spain safely and married Prince John on 3 April 1497 in Burgos Cathedral. Although the marriage was a political one, the young couple quickly became devoted to each other. Apparently, the amount of time they spent in bed made the court physicians uneasy about the Prince's health.

== Death ==
In September 1497, John's fragile health prevented him from joining his parents and sister, Infanta Isabella, as they journeyed to the Portuguese border for her wedding to Manuel I. Instead, he and Margaret travelled to Salamanca, marking their arrival with a ceremonial entry. The next week, after receiving reports that John's condition was worsening, Ferdinand rushed to his son's bedside.

On 4 October 1497, John died, possibly of tuberculosis or smallpox. (Note: Contemporaries, namely Peter Martyr d'Anghiera, attributed the prince's death to sexual over-exertion, but the claim lacks evidence.) His dog, a lurcher called Bruto, had whimpered as he died, then stayed next to his coffin throughout the vigil in Salamanca's main church. John's devastated mother would later keep the dog next to her, as if to keep the memory of her beloved son with her. Six months later, on 2 April 1498, the Princess of Asturias gave birth to their only child, a stillborn girl.

== Consequences ==
John's death was followed closely by that of his sister Isabella in 1498. Her only child, Miguel de la Paz, died in 1500. The Spanish kingdoms passed to his younger sister Joanna, her husband Philip the Handsome, and their Habsburg descendants. Philip had himself and Joanna declared as 'Princes of Castile' which her parents saw as disrespectful towards his deceased brother-in-law.

== Ancestry ==
Ancestors of John, Prince of Asturias

8. Ferdinand I of Aragon
4. John II of Aragon
9. Eleanor of Alburquerque
2. Ferdinand II of Aragon
10. Fadrique Enríquez
5. Juana Enríquez
11. Mariana Fernández de Córdoba
1. John, Prince of Asturias
12. Henry III of Castile
6. John II of Castile
13. Catherine of Lancaster
3. Isabella I of Castile
14. John, Constable of Portugal
7. Isabella of Portugal
15. Isabel of Barcelos

== Sources ==
- Álvarez, Manuel Fernández (2003). Isabel la Católica (PDF) (in Spanish).
- Edwards, John (2005). Ferdinand and Isabella. Pearson Education Limited.
- Elliot, J.H. (1963). Imperial Spain 1469–1716. London: Edward Arnold.
- Fernández-Armesto, Felipe (1991). Ferdinand and Isabella. New York: Dorset Press.
- Fernández de Oviedo y Valdés, Gonzalo (1870). Libro de la Cámara Real del Príncipe Don Juan e Offiçios de su Casa e Seruiçio Ordinario. Madrid: Sociedad de Bibliófilos Españoles.
- Jansen, Sharon L. (2002). The Monstrous Regiment of Women: Female Rulers in Early Modern Europe.
- Kamen, Henry (2005). Spain, 1469–1714: A Society of Conflict (Third ed.). Longman. ISBN 978-0-582-78464-2.
- Sánchez, Margarita (11 May 2018). "La muerte del príncipe Don Juan. Exequias y duelo en Córdoba y Sevilla durante el otoño de 1497" [The Death of Prince Juan. Funeral Rites and Mourning in Cordoba and Seville during the Autumn of 1497]. Espacio, Tiempo y Forma. Serie III, Historia Medieval (31). Universidad Nacional de Educacion a Distancia: 107–133. doi:10.5944/etfiii.31.2018.21137.
- Stuart, Nancy Rubin (1991). Isabella of Castile: The First Renaissance Queen. New York: St. Martin's Press.
- Tremlett, Giles (2010). Catherine of Aragon, Henry's Spanish Queen. London: Faber and Faber.

John, Prince of Asturias House of Trastámara Born: 28 June 1478 Died: 4 October 1497
Royal titles
Preceded by Isabella of Aragon	Prince of Asturias; 1478–1497	Succeeded by Isabella of Aragon
Preceded by Ferdinand of Aragon	Prince of Girona; 1479–1497	Succeeded by Miguel of Portugal
