= List of titles and honours of Juan Carlos I =

Juan Carlos I has received numerous decorations and honorary appointments as monarch of Spain. Spanish monarchical titles or styles are listed in order of degrees of sovereignty, nobility, and honour.

== Royal titles and styles ==
Styles of King Juan Carlos I
- Reference style: His Majesty
- Spoken style: Your Majesty

- 5 January 1938 – 15 January 1941: His Royal Highness Infante Don Juan Carlos
- 15 January 1941 – 22 November 1975: His Royal Highness The Prince of Asturias (titular)
- 21 July 1969 – 22 November 1975: His Royal Highness The Prince of Spain
- 22 November 1975 – 19 June 2014: His Majesty The King
- 19 June 2014 – present: His Majesty King Don Juan Carlos

As a grandson to deposed King Alfonso XIII, Juan Carlos was an Infante of Spain from birth. His father Infante Juan, Count of Barcelona became Head of the Royal House after his father's and elder brother's deaths and his other elder brother's renunciation. Juan Carlos thus became titular Prince of Asturias, the title traditionally held by the heir to the Spanish throne. In 1969, twelve years after the Law of Succession to the Headship of the State, the Spanish dictator Francisco Franco skipped Infante Juan and designated Juan Carlos as his successor, with the title Prince of Spain. On Franco's death in 1975, he thus became King of Spain.

The Spanish titles of Juan Carlos I as monarch of Spain were as follows:

- King of Spain
- King of Castile, of León, of Aragon, of the Two Sicilies* (Naples and Sicily), of Jerusalem*, of Navarre, of Granada, of Toledo, of Valencia, of Galicia, of Majorca, of Seville, of Sardinia*, of Córdoba, of Corsica*, of Murcia, of Menorca, of Jaén, of the Algarves*, of Algeciras, of Gibraltar*, of the Canary Islands, of the East Indies* and West Indies* and of the Islands and Mainland of the Ocean Sea*;
- Archduke of Austria*;
- Duke of Burgundy*, of Brabant*, of Milan*, of Athens*, of Neopatras* (New Patras) and of Limburg*;
- Count of Habsburg*, of Flanders*, of Tyrol*, of Roussillon* and of Barcelona;
- Lord of Biscay and of Molina

Titles in pretence marked with * are historical titles which are only nominal and ceremonial.

== Honours ==
Country	Date	Appointment	Ribbon	Other
Spain
Spain	1941	1,171st Knight of the Royal Spanish Order of the Golden Fleece		
Spain	1957/1969-1989	Cord and Sash of the Victory 1936-1939		
Spain	1962	Knight of the Collar of the Royal and Distinguished Spanish Order of Charles III		
Spain	20 February 1971	Gold Medal (1st class) of the 4th Centenary of the Battle of Lepanto		
Spain	1970s	Grand Cross of the Order of Cisneros		
Spain	1975–2014	20th Grand Master of the Spanish Order of the Golden Fleece		
Spain	1975–2014	Grand Master of the Royal and Distinguished Spanish Order of Charles III		
Spain	1975–2014	De facto Sovereign of the Royal Order of Noble Ladies of Queen Maria Luisa		
Spain	1975–2014	Grand Master of the Royal Order of Isabella the Catholic		
Spain	1975–2014	Grand Master of the Royal Order of Civil Merit		
Spain	1975–2014	Grand Master of the Civil Order of Alfonso X, the Wise		
Spain	1975–2014	Grand Master of the Order of the Cross of St. Raymond of Peñafort		
Spain	1975–2014	Grand Master of the Order of Constitutional Merit		
Spain	1975–2014	Grand Master of the Royal and Military Order of St. Ferdinand		
Spain	1975–2014	Grand Master and Knight Grand Cross with White Decoration of the Order of Military Merit		
Spain	1975–2014	Grand Master and Knight Grand Cross with White Decoration of the Order of Naval Merit		
Spain	1975–2014	Grand Master and Knight Grand Cross with White Decoration of the Order of Aeronautical Merit		
Spain	1975–2014	Grand Master of the Royal and Military Order of Saint Hermenegild		
Spain	1975–2014	Grand Master of the Decoration of Merit of Civil Guards		
Spain	1975–2014	Grand Master of the Royal Military Order of Calatrava		
Spain	1975–2014	Grand Master of the Royal Military Order of Santiago		
Spain	1975–2014	Grand Master of the Royal Military Order of Alcántara		
Spain	1975–2014	Grand Master of the Royal Military Order of Montesa		
Algeria		Order of the Athir		
Argentina	1 December 1978	Collar of the Order of the Liberator General San Martín		
Austria		Grand Star of the Decoration of Honour for Services to the Republic of Austria		
Belgium		Grand Cordon of the Order of Leopold		
Brazil	1991	Grand Collar of the National Order of the Southern Cross		
(Bulgaria) Bulgarian Royal Family		Knight of the Royal Order of Saints Cyril and Methodius		
Chile		Collar of the Grand Cross of the Order of Merit		
Colombia		Grand Collar of the Order of Boyaca		
Colombia		Collar of the Order of San Carlos		
Costa Rica	27 January 1993	Grand Cross of Gold of the Order of Juan Mora Fernández		
Czech Republic	12 July 1995	Grand Cross with Collar of the Order of the White Lion		
Denmark	17 March 1980	Knight of the Order of the Elephant		
Dominican Republic	24 October 1969	Collar of the Order of Merit of Duarte, Sánchez and Mella		
Ecuador		Grand Collar of the National Order of San Lorenzo		
Egypt		Grand Cordon of the Order of the Nile		
El Salvador		Grand Cross with Gold Plaque and Special Distinction of the National Order of José Matías Delgado		
Estonia		Collar of the Order of the Cross of Terra Marian		
Equatorial Guinea		Grand Cross with Collar of the National Order		
(Ethiopia) Ethiopian Imperial Family		Knight Grand Collar of the Imperial Order of Solomon		
(Ethiopia) Ethiopian Imperial Family		Knight Grand Cordon of the Imperial Order of the Seal of Solomon		
Finland		Grand Cross with Collar of the Order of the White Rose		
France		Grand Cross of the National Order of the Legion of Honour		
France		Grand Cross of the National Order of Merit		
Germany		Grand Cross Special Class of the Order of Merit of the Federal Republic of Germany		
(Greece) Greek Republic		Grand Cross of the Order of the Redeemer		
(Kingdom of Greece) Greek Royal Family		Knight Grand Cross of the Royal Order of the Redeemer		
(Kingdom of Greece) Greek Royal Family		Knight Grand Cross with Collar of the Royal Family Order of Saints George and Constantine		
(Kingdom of Greece) Greek Royal Family		Recipient of the Commemorative Badge for the Centenary of the Greek Royal House		
Guatemala		Collar of the Order of the Quetzal		
Holy See		Knight of the Collar of the Equestrian Order of the Holy Sepulchre of Jerusalem		
Holy See		Knight of the Collar of the Order of Pope Pius IX		
Honduras		Grand Cross with Gold Star of the Order of Francisco Morazán		
Hungary		Grand Cross with Chain the Order of Merit of the Republic of Hungary		
Iceland		Collar with Grand Cross Breast Star of the Order of the Falcon		
Indonesia		Member 1st class (Adipurna) of the Order of the Star of the Republic of Indonesia		
Imperial State of Iran		Member 1st Class of the Imperial Order of Pahlavi		
Imperial State of Iran		Recipient of the Commemorative Medal of the 2,500 year Celebration of the Persian Empire		
Italian Republic		Knight Grand Cross with Collar of the Order of Merit of the Italian Republic		
(Kingdom of Italy) Italian Royal Family		Knight of the Supreme Order of the Most Holy Annunciation		
(Kingdom of the Two Sicilies) Two Sicilian Royal Family (Hispano-Neapolitan branch)		Knight of the Illustrious Royal Order of Saint Januarius		
(Kingdom of the Two Sicilies) Two Sicilian Royal Family (Hispano-Neapolitan branch)		Bailiff Knight Grand Cross with Collar of Justice of the Sacred Military Constantinian Order of Saint George		
Jamaica		Member of the Order of Excellence		
Japan		Collar of the Supreme Order of the Chrysanthemum		
Jordan		Grand Cordon with Collar of the Order of al-Hussein bin Ali		
Kingdom of Nepal		Recipient of the Royal Mahendra Chain		
Kingdom of Nepal		Member of the Royal Order of Honour		
Kuwait		Collar of the Order of Mubarak the Great		
Latvia		Commander Grand Cross with Chain of the Order of the Three Stars		
Lebanon		Member Extraordinary Grade of the Order of Merit		
Lithuania		Grand Cross with Collar of the Order of Vytautas the Great		
Luxembourg		Knight of the Order of the Gold Lion of the House of Nassau		
Malta		Honorary Companion of Honour with Collar of the National Order of Merit		
Mexico		Collar of the Mexican Order of the Aztec Eagle		
Monaco		Grand Officer of the Order of Saint-Charles		
Morocco		Member Special Class of the Order of Muhammad		
Netherlands		Knight Grand Cross of the Order of the Netherlands Lion		
Netherlands		Grand Cross of the Order of the House of Orange		
Netherlands		Recipient of the Wedding Medal of Princess Beatrix of the Netherlands and Claus van Amsberg		
Nigeria		Grand Commander of the Order of the Niger		
Norway		Grand Cross with Collar of the Royal Norwegian Order of Saint Olav		
Oman		Member 1st Class Military Order of Oman		
Panama		Collar of the Order of Manuel Amador Guerrero		
Panama		Extraordinary Grand Cross of the Order of Vasco Núñez de Balboa		
Peru		Grand Cross with Diamonds of the Order of the Sun of Peru		
Philippines		Grand Collar of the Order of Lakandula		
Philippines		Grand Collar of the Order of Sikatuna		
Philippines		Knight Grand Cross of the Order of the Knights of Rizal		
Poland	2001	Knight of the Order of the White Eagle		
Portuguese Republic	2000	Grand Collar of the Ancient and Most Noble Military Order of the Tower and of the Sword, of the Valour, Loyalty and Merit		
Portuguese Republic	1996	Grand Cross of the Military Order of Christ		
Portuguese Republic	1978	Grand Collar of the Military Order of Saint James of the Sword		
Portuguese Republic	2007	Grand Cross of the Military Order of Saint Benedict of Aviz		
Portuguese Republic	1978	Grand Collar of the Order of Prince Henry		
Portuguese Republic	1988	Grand Collar of the Order of Liberty		
(Kingdom of Portugal) Portuguese Royal Family		Knight Grand Cross with Collar of the Royal Order of the Immaculate Conception of Vila Viçosa		
Romania		Collar of the Order of the Star of Romania		
Senegal		Grand Cross of the National Order of the Lion		
Slovakia		Grand Cross of the Order of the White Double Cross		
Sovereign Military Order of Malta		Bailiff Knight Grand Cross of the Sovereign Military Order of Malta		
South Africa		Grand Collar of the Order of Good Hope		
South Korea	1996	Member of the Grand Order of Mugunghwa		
Sweden	5 October 1979	Knight of the Royal Order of the Seraphim		
Thailand		Knight of the Most Auspicious Order of the Rajamitrabhorn		
Thailand		Knight of the Most Illustrious Order of the Royal House of Chakri		
United Arab Emirates		Collar of the Order of Zayed		
United Kingdom	1988	Stranger Knight Companion of the Most Noble Order of the Garter		(970th member)
United Kingdom	1986	Recipient of the Royal Victorian Chain		
Uruguay	1996	Medal of the Oriental Republic of Uruguay		
Venezuela		Collar of the Order of the Liberator		
Yugoslavia	1985	Order of the Yugoslav Great Star		
Zaire		Grand Cordon of the National Order of the Leopard		

== Awards ==
- Germany: Charlemagne Prize (1982)
- Russia: Laureate of the Russian Federation National Award (2010) for Outstanding Achievement in the Humanitarian Field
- Switzerland: Jean Monnet Award of the Jean Monnet Foundation for Europe for his work on integrating Spain into the European Community
- USA:
  - Member of the Sons of the American Revolution organisation
  - Freedom medal of the Roosevelt Institute (1996)
  - World Statesman Award (1997) of the Appeal of Conscience Foundation
- Gold Olympic Order, 1985
- UNESCO
  - International Simón Bolívar Prize (1983)
  - Félix Houphouët-Boigny Peace Prize (1994)

=== International sovereign organisations ===
- International Order of St. Hubertus
  - Protector of the International Order of St. Hubertus

== Honorific eponyms ==
- Spain
  - Madrid: Rey Juan Carlos University
  - Madrid: Juan Carlos I Park
  - Spanish ship Juan Carlos I (L61)
  - Antarctica: Juan Carlos I Antarctic Base on Livingston Island in the South Shetland Islands
  - King Juan Carlos Prize in Economics
- USA
  - New York City: King Juan Carlos I of Spain Center at New York University Graduate School of Arts and Science, to foster the study of Hispanic culture and language

== Other honours ==
- Spain
  - Instituto Cervantes: Honorary President 21 March 1991 – 19 June 2014
- Holy See
  - Basilica di Santa Maria Maggiore: Protocanon (ex officio) 22 November 1975 – 19 June 2014
  - Basilica di San Paolo fuori le Mura: Protocanon (ex officio) 22 November 1975 – 19 June 2014
- Other:
  - : Honorary President of the Organization of Ibero-American States

=== Scholastic ===
The king has been the recipient of numerous honorary doctorates and degrees, including:

Honorary doctorates

- Argentina
  - University of Buenos Aires
- France
  - University of Paris (La Sorbonne)
- Italy
  - University of Bologna
- Philippines
  - University of Santo Tomas
- United Kingdom
  - University of Cambridge
  - University of Oxford
- USA
  - Harvard University
  - Southern Methodist University (where, in 2001, he formally opened the Meadows Museum, housing the largest collection of Spanish art outside Spain)
  - Georgetown University, Honorary Doctor of Laws

Degrees

- Netherlands
  - University of Utrecht in the Netherlands (25 October 2001).
- USA
  - New York University

Spanish Royal Academies

- Spanish Royal Academies Board: High Patron (ex officio) 22 November 1975 – 19 June 2014

Other

- Gold Medal of the Jean Monnet Foundation for Europe, in 1996.
- Elected to the American Philosophical Society in 1992.

== Military rank ==
- 1964 – ?: Ship-of-the-line lieutenant, Spanish Navy
- 1973 – 22 November 1975: Brigadier general, Spanish Army
- 1973 – 22 November 1975: Counter admiral, Spanish Navy
- 1973 – 22 November 1975: Brigadier general, Spanish Air Force
- 22 November 1975 – 19 June 2014: Captain General of the Spanish Armed Forces

== See also ==
- List of titles and honours of Queen Sofía of Spain
- List of titles and honours of Felipe VI of Spain
- List of titles and honours of Queen Letizia of Spain
- List of titles and honours of Leonor, Princess of Asturias
- List of honours of the Spanish Royal Family by country
- List of titles and honours of the Spanish Crown
- Military career and honours of Francisco Franco

== Notes ==
*: Orders of the Kingdom of Spain with the grand mastership assumed by Francisco Franco as Spanish Head of State.

**: Dynastic orders with the domain remained by Infante Juan, Count of Barcelona, Head of the Spanish Royal House, until his formal renounce in 1977.
