= List of titles and honours of the Spanish Crown =

The coat of arms of the Spanish Crown

The current Spanish constitution refers to the monarchy as "The Crown" and the constitutional title of the monarch is simply rey/reina de España: that is, "king/queen of Spain". However, the constitution allows for the use of other historic titles pertaining to the Spanish monarchy, without specifying them. A royal decree promulgated 6 November 1987 at the Council of Ministers regulates the titles further, and on that basis the monarch of Spain has a right to use ("may use") those other titles appertaining to the Crown. Contrary to some belief, the long titulary that contains the list of over 20 kingdoms is not in state use, nor is it used in Spanish diplomacy. In fact, it has never been in use in that form, as "Spain" was never a part of the list in the pre-1837 era when the long list was officially used.

Spain, mentioned differently in the titulary depending on which monarch was reigning, was for more than three centuries also symbolized by the long list that started "... of Castile, León, Aragón, ..." The following long titulary in the feudal style was last used officially in 1836 by Queen Isabella II (see the account of titulary in her article) before she became constitutional queen.

Isabella I of Castile and Ferdinand II of Aragon were together described as the Catholic Monarchs of Spain. The first king to officially use a derivation of the name "Spain" as the realm in the titulary was Charles I of Spain, who used Rex Hispaniarum et Indiarum (i.e. King of the Spains and the Indies). This title was often used after his title of Holy Roman Emperor which was superior to that of king. During his brief and controversial occupancy of the throne Joseph Bonaparte, brother of Emperor Napoleon, also used a similar title, King of the Spains and the Indies, and conferred the title "Prince of Spain" to be hereditary on his children and grandchildren in the male and female line.

During the first restoration of the Bourbons, it returned to the traditional format ("of Castile, Leon, Aragon, ...") until 1837, when the short version "queen of the Spains" was taken into use by Isabella II. The singular Spain was first used by Amadeo—he was "by divine grace and will of nation, king of Spain". During the second restoration, King Alfonso XII started to use "constitutional king of Spain, by divine and constitutional grace".

Juan Carlos I, King from 1975 to 2014, did not use the style of Catholic Majesty and the other titles and honours, but did not relinquish them. Like his father, King Felipe VI uses the simple title of "King of Spain", without any divine, national or constitutional reference.

== Titles associated with the Spanish Crown ==
The titles used by the last Habsburg king of Spain, Charles II, were:

By the Grace of God, King of Castile, of León, of Aragon, of the Two Sicilies, of Jerusalem, of Dalmatia, of Croatia, of Navarre, of Granada, of Toledo, of Valencia, of Galicia, of Mallorca, of Seville, of Sardinia, of Córdoba, of Corsica, of Murcia, of Jaén, of the Algarves, of Algeciras, of the Canary Islands, of the East and West Indies, of the Islands and Mainland of the Ocean Sea; Archduke of Austria; Duke of Burgundy, of Brabant, of Milan, of Athens and Neopatria; Count of Habsburg, of Flanders, of Tyrol, of Barcelona, of Roussillon, and of Cerdanya; Marquess of Oristano and Count of Goceano.

The title used by the first Bourbon (Bourbon-Anjou branch of the House of Capet) king of Spain, King Philip V of Spain, was: Don Philip, By the Grace of God, King of Castile, of León, of Aragon, of the Two Sicilies, of Jerusalem, of Navarre, of Granada, of Toledo, of Valencia, of Galicia, of Mallorca, of Seville, of Sardinia, of Cordóba, of Corsica, of Murcia, of Jaen, of the Algarves, of Algeciras, of Gibraltar, of the Canary Islands, of the East and West Indies, of the Islands and Mainland of the Ocean Sea, Archduke of Austria, Duke of Anjou, of Burgundy, of Brabant and of Milan, Count of Habsburg, of Flanders, of Tyrol and of Barcelona, Lord of Biscay and of Molina, etc.

Greater royal arms of Spain from Charles III (1761–1868) to Alfonso XIII (1875–1931)

=== Empires ===
- Emperor of All Spain

=== Kingdoms ===
- King of Spain
- King of Asturias
- King of Castile
- King of León
- King of Aragon
- King of Jerusalem (Note: Titles in Pretence: historical title which is only nominal and ceremonial.)
- King of Cyprus
- King of Navarre
- King of Pamplona
- King of Granada
- King of Mallorca
- King of Toledo
- King of Seville
- King of Valencia
- King of Galicia
- King of Sardinia
- King of Cordoba
- King of Corsica
- King of Menorca
- King of Murcia
- King of Jaén
- King of the Algarves (Note: Spain today holds Ceuta, a city which, at time when the country got hold of it, was part of the Kingdom of the Algarves.)
- King of Algeciras
- King of Gibraltar
- King of the Canary Islands
- King of the Spanish East Indies
- King of the Spanish West Indies
- King of the Islands and Mainland of the Ocean Sea

=== Duchies ===
- Duke of Burgundy
- Duke of Brabant
- Duke of Limburg
- Duke of Lothier
- Duke of Milan
- Duke of Luxembourg
- Duke of Athens
- Duke of Neopatria

=== Counties ===
- Count of Habsburg
- Count of Flanders
- Count of Holland
- Count of Zeeland
- Count of Burgundy
- Count of Hainaut
- Count of Namur
- Count of Artois
- Count of Charolais
- Count of Tyrol
- Count of Roussillon
- Count of Cerdanya
- Count of Barcelona
- Count of Girona
- Count of Osona
- Count of Besalú
- Count of Covadonga

=== Lordships ===
- Lord of Biscay
- Lord of Molina

=== Other titles maintained, but usually abbreviated with "etc." ===
Because of the large number of titles associated with the Spanish Crown, only the most important were written, finishing the list with "etc." or "&c.", referring to minor or obsolete titles. These titles are:

- Duke of Limburg, of Lothier, of Luxemburg, of Gelderland, of Styria, of Carniola, of Carinthia, and of Württemberg;
- Landgrave of Alsace;
- Prince of Swabia;
- Palatine Count of Burgundy;
- Count of Artois, of Hainaut, of Namur, of Gorizia, of Ferrette, of Haut-Rhin, and of Kyburg;
- Marquis of Oristano, and of Goceano;
- Margrave of the Holy Roman Empire, and of Burgau;
- Lord of Salins, of Mechelen, of the Slovenian March, of Pordenone, and of Tripoli.
- Rex Catholicissimus

Andreas Palaiologos, the nephew of the last Byzantine emperor, designated Ferdinand II of Aragon and Isabella I of Castile as his heirs at his death in 1502. However, neither Ferdinand nor Isabella, nor any succeeding monarch of Spain, ever used the title.

=== Military rank ===
- : Captain General of the Spanish Armed Forces

=== Hereditary orders of Spain ===
Collar of a Knight of the Order of the Golden Fleece.

The insignia of the Order of Charles III.

- Sovereign Grand Master of the Celebrated Order of the Golden Fleece
- Grand Master of the Royal & Distinguished Order of Charles III
- Grand Master of the Royal Order of Isabel, the Catholic
- Grand Master of the Royal Order of Civil Merit
- Grand Master of the Royal and Military Order of Saint Ferdinand
- Grand Master of the Royal and Military Order of Saint Hermenegild
- Grand Master of the Order of Montesa
- Grand Master of the Order of Alcántara
- Grand Master of the Order of Calatrava
- Grand Master of the Order of Santiago
- Grand Master of the Order of Queen Maria Luisa

== Titles of the heir apparent or heir presumptive ==
The coat of arms of the Princess of Asturias

Titles and styles are listed in order of degrees of rank, nobility, and honor:

=== Principalities ===
- Prince of Asturias—title of the first-in-line to the Kingdom of Spain and earlier Crown of Castile-León
- Prince of Girona—title of the first-in-line of the Crown of Aragon
- Prince of Viana—title of the first-in-line of the Kingdom of Navarre

=== Duchy, county and lordship ===
- Duke of Montblanc—title of the first-in-line to the Principality of Catalonia
- Count of Cervera—title of the first-in-line to the Kingdom of Valencia
- Lord of Balaguer—title of the first in line to the Kingdom of Mallorca

=== Orders of the heir apparent ===
The following orders are traditionally granted to the heir apparent:

- Knight of the Celebrated Order of the Golden Fleece
- Knight of the Collar of the Royal and Distinguished Order of Charles III
- Knight Grand Cross of the Royal and Military Order of San Hermenegildo
- Commandeur-Major of Castile of the Order of Santiago
- Knight of the Order of Alcántara
- Knight of the Order of Calatrava
- Knight of the Order of Montesa

== Royal titles ==
=== Duchies ===
- Cádiz
- Seville
- Segovia
- Badajoz
- Soria
- Lugo
- Palma de Mallorca

=== Counties ===
- Chinchón
- Molina
- Montemolín
- Montizón
- Barcelona
- Covadonga

== Byzantine Empire ==
- Andreas Palaiologos, who claimed the right of succession to the defunct Byzantine Empire, sold his rights to Ferdinand II of Aragon and Isabella I of Castile before his death in 1502. However, in practice this title and claim was never much pushed or enacted to reclaim Constantinople or any Byzantine territories.

== See also ==
- Imperator totius Hispaniae
- List of titles and honours of Juan Carlos I of Spain
- List of titles and honours of Queen Sofía of Spain
- List of titles and honours of Felipe VI of Spain
- List of titles and honours of Queen Letizia of Spain
- List of titles and honours of Leonor, Princess of Asturias
