= Martha of Armagnac =

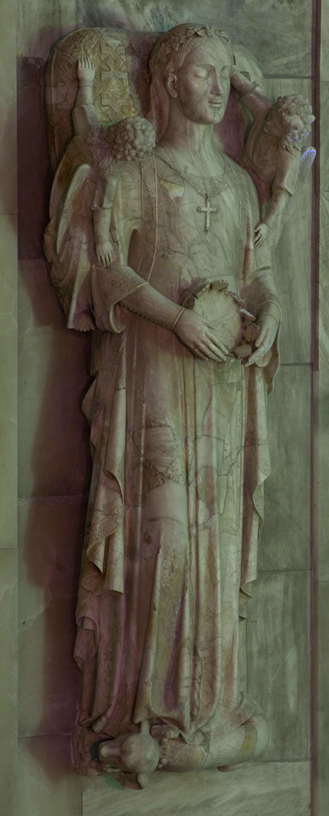

Duchess of Girona and Countess of Cervera
- Tenure: 24 June 1373 – 13 July 1378
- Born: after 18 February 1347; Armagnac
- Died: 13 July 1378; Zaragoza
- Burial: Convent of St. Francis
- Spouse: John, Duke of Girona
- Issue among others...: Joanna, Countess of Foix
- House: House of Armagnac; House of Barcelona
- Father: John I, Count of Armagnac
- Mother: Beatrice of Clermont

Martha of Armagnac (after 18 February 1347 – 23 October 1378) was the youngest child of John I, Count of Armagnac, and his second wife Beatrice of Clermont. She was the first wife of John I of Aragon but never became Queen of Aragon because she was outlived by her father-in-law Peter IV of Aragon.

== Early life and family ==
Martha was the youngest of three children. Her elder brother was John II of Armagnac, who succeeded their father. Her sister was Joanna of Armagnac who married John, Duke of Berry and was mother of Marie, Duchess of Auvergne, amongst others.

Her maternal grandparents were Jean de Clermont and his wife Jeanne de Dargies. Jean was son of Robert, Count of Clermont and his wife Beatrice, Dame de Bourbon. Robert was son of Louis IX of France and Margaret of Provence.

The grandparents of Martha's father were Bernard VI of Armagnac and Cecile de Rodez.

Martha was not named in domini Johannis comitis Armaniaci which listed the names of her family, so she must have been born after its making on 18 February 1347.

== Marriage ==
Martha was a proposed wife for Peter II of Alençon in 1370 but he instead married Marie, Viscountess of Beaumont-au-Maine.

During these years, Peter IV of Aragon had sought an alliance with Philip VI of France to prevent a new war with Castile. In 1370 he negotiated a marriage for his heir; John, Duke of Girona with Jeanne of France, daughter of Philip VI but the project failed when the princess died on her journey to Barcelona in 1371. Moreover, Henry II of Castile became an ally necessary to Charles V of France (who had helped get the Castilian throne), as demonstrated with the triumph of his army against the English at the Battle of La Rochelle (June 1372).

In this context Martha's father John, a major feudal lord of Occitania and, a vassal of the King of France, appeared in the eyes of King Peter and although they had been enemies during the War of the Two Peters, he was a good insurance against the Castilian threat. The count of Armagnac wished to strengthen its position in Occitania and in France and get a good ally against its rival, the Counts of Foix. Negotiations began in summer 1372 and of the marriage contract was signed on March 27, 1373, for the marriage of Martha to John, son of King Peter IV. The dowry amounted to the astronomical figure of 150,000 pounds. Martha was received with great solemnity at the border according to sources of Martin, John's younger brother.

On 24 June 1373 in Barcelona, John and Martha married. Afterwards she became the first to be titled Duchess of Girona and Countess of Cervera.

Martha had a calm and conciliatory character, traits that would guarantee good terms with her new family and country; she had moderating influence on John, who had a character quite the opposite of her and deeply appreciated. Martha even got along well with her father-in-law who dealt with her with great affection, and in general all members of the royal family. Her mother-in-law Eleanor of Sicily treated Martha as her own daughter. On Eleanor's death King Peter remarried to Sibila of Fortia, a marriage that caused great scandal. However, Martha and Sibila maintained a cordial relationship, but John had a bad attitude to his stepmother.

=== Issue ===
John and Martha had five children:

- Infante James of Aragon (b. Valencia 24 June 1374 - d. Valencia 1374)
- Infanta Joanna (b. Daroca October 1375 - d. Valencia September 1407), who married on 4 June 1392 at Barcelona to Mathieu, Count of Foix. Together they claimed the throne of Aragon after her father's death. Matthew of Foix invaded Aragonese territories, but was driven back by the new King Martin. Joanna died soon after, childless.
- Infante John of Aragon (b. and d. Barcelona July 1376)
- Infante Alfonso of Aragon (b. and d. 1377)
- Infanta Eleanor of Aragon (b. and d. 1378)

Of their five children, only one daughter Joanna lived to adulthood but she had no children so Martha's lineage died out in 1407 on the death of her daughter.

== Death and legacy ==
Martha died at Zaragoza on 13 July 1378, her death was probably related to the birth of her daughter Eleanor who died not long after birth. John and Martha were only married for five years, a child was born each year they were married. She was buried at the Convent of St. Francis. She died nine years before her husband succeeded as King of Aragon.

After Martha's death he remarried to Violant of Bar who bore him numerous children but like Martha only one of Violant's children, a daughter lived to adulthood, Yolande of Aragon.

Martha's only surviving child Joanna tried to claim the Kingdom of Aragon but failed.

== Ancestry ==
Ancestors of Martha of Armagnac

8. Gerald VI of Armagnac
4. Bernard VI d'Armagnac
9. Martha de Béarn
2. John I of Armagnac
10. Henry II, Count of Rodez
5. Cecilia of Rodez
11. Mascarose of Baux
1. Martha of Armagnac
12. Robert, Count of Clermont
6. John, Baron of Charolais
13. Beatrice of Bourbon
3. Beatrice of Clermont
14. Renaud II, Lord of Dargies
7. Jeanne d'Argies
15. Agnes de Bruyeres

== Bibliography ==
- https://web.archive.org/web/20111009001332/http://documents.univ-lille3.fr/files/pub/www/recherche/theses/barrois-dominique/html/these_front.html
- Aurea L. * Santos Wall, Martha Armanyach, Duchess of Gerona, Madrid, Tip. File, 1930 .
- Aurea L. * Santos Wall, Mata of Armagnac, Duchess of Girona, Barcelona, Rafael Dalmau ( episodes of history, 88), 1967.
- Joseph M. Madurell and Marimon, " The Marriage of Prince John and Martha of Armagnac, Catalan University Studies, 19 ( 1934) .
- Rafael Olivar Bertrand , Royal Wedding between France and the Crown of Aragon: political marriage of princes of Aragón and Catalonia, with respect to France, in the fourteenth century, Barcelona, Alberto Martin, 1947 .
- Joseph Trenchs, " The fish kills the princess table of Armagnac : the whims and fancies of a princess, " Go to Colloquium in History of Food in the Crown of Aragon . Middle Ages. Acts , vol. 2, Lleida, Lleida Studies Institute, 1995, pp. 309–328 .
