= Order of Merit (Lebanon) =

Highest national decoration

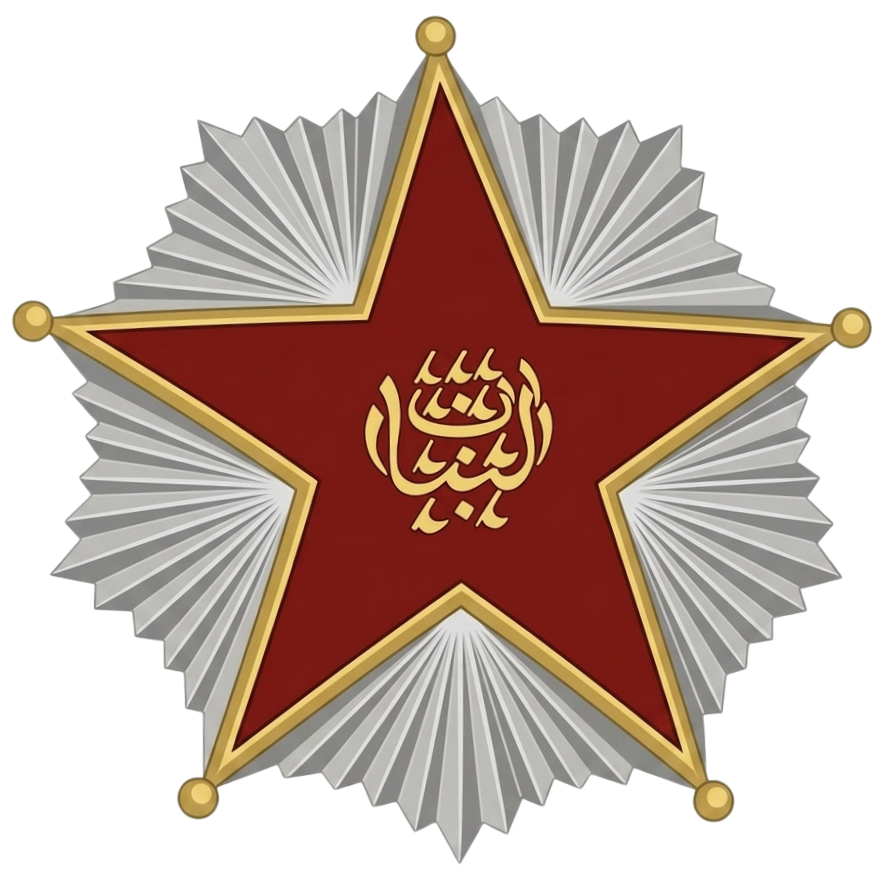
- Grand Cordon of the order.

Awarded by Lebanon
- Type: Order of merit
- Established: 16 January 1922
- Status: Active
- Grades: 5 grades

Precedence
- Next (higher): None
- Next (lower): National Order of the Cedar

The Order of Merit (Arabic: وسام الاستحقاق اللبناني) is a Lebanese order of merit and the highest honorary decoration in Lebanon. Founded on 16 January 1922 by the mandate authorities, it has from its inception rewarded civilians who perform acts of chivalry and loyalty to the nation. It may be awarded posthumously to those who deserve it.

== History ==
With the declaration of the State of Greater Lebanon in 1920, the mandate authorities sought to create a special medal to be awarded by the Lebanese government, named the 'Lebanese Order of Merit'. A competition was organised to select the best design, which was won by the artist Georges Corm. His winning design depicted a Lebanese man in traditional costume preventing a lion from attacking a Lebanese village. The ruler of Greater Lebanon issued Resolution 108 on 16 January 1922, the first article of which stipulated: 'An honorary medal called the Lebanese Medal of Merit has been created to reward those who perform acts of chivalry and loyalty, and it may be awarded posthumously to those who deserve it.'

The Order of Lebanese Merit was established by Decision No. 1080 on 16 January 1922 and is governed by the decree relating to the code of decorations (Law No. 122 of 12 June 1959).

== Recipients ==
Extraordinary Grade

- Akihito
- Abdullah II of Jordan
- Charles de Gaulle
- Elizabeth II
- Isaac Kalonji
- Jean-Bédel Bokassa
- Juan Carlos I of Spain
- Jules Fontaine Sambwa
- Maria Barroso
- Mohammad Reza Pahlavi
- Queen Sofía of Spain

Grand Cordons

- Mounir Abou Fadel
- Qaboos bin Said
- Felipe VI of Spain
- Jassim bin Hamad bin Khalifa Al Thani
- Princess Lalla Meryem of Morocco
- Queen Letizia of Spain
- Mahathir Mohamad
- Queen Sofía of Spain

1st Grade

- Nadhmi Auchi
- Ardem Patapoutian
- Édouard Guillaud
- François al-Hajj
- Michel Suleiman
- Nazih Elias Hedari

2nd Grade

- Michel Suleiman

3rd Grade

- François al-Hajj
- Michel Suleiman
- Philip S. Khoury
- Raif S. Geha

Other or Unknown Grades

- Maha Bayrakdar
- Emile Boustany
- Alice Delysia
- Fairuz
- Moustafa Farroukh
- Faten Hamama
- Jesse B. Jackson
- Aram Karamanoukian
- Stanley Kerr
- Duraid Lahham
- Ahmed Rami (poet)
- Anissa Rawda Najjar
- Asad Rustum
- Ali Wehbi
- Mayyas

== Dignities and classes ==
This order consists of two dignities and four ordinary classes as follows:

- Extraordinary Class, for heads of state (Photo)
- Grand Cordon for Prime Ministers, royalties and other dignitaries (Photo)
- First Class
- Second Class
- Third Class
- Fourth Class

Ribbon bars
Extraordinary Class	Grand Cordon	1st Class	2nd Class	3rd Class	4th Class

== Sources ==
- Medals of the World, Orders, decorations, and medals of Lebanon
- Global Security Lebanese Order of Merit
