= Abiathar Crescas =

Jewish physician and astrologer

Abiathar Crescas (Aragonese: [aβiaˈtaɾ ˈkɾeskas], Catalan pronunciation: [əβiəˈtaɾ ˈkɾeskəs]) was a 15th-century physician and astrologer from the Crown of Aragon (now part of Spain). He was head astrologer to King John II of Aragon, father of King Ferdinand of Aragon.

He could remove cataracts by a surgical procedure known as couching. In 1468 he restored the eyesight of King John in two simple operations, who was completely blind before the surgeries. Shortly after King John II's death, Abiathar led his memorial service held by the Jewish community of Cervera in January, 1479.

Crescas was a leader of Aragon's Jewish community.
