= Maravedí (tax) =

Form of tax

The Maravedi or coinage is an ancient tax levied in various peninsular kingdoms such as the Kingdom of Aragon and the Kingdom of Navarre (modern Spain). In Castile, it was known as the foral coinage. The purpose of this tax was to prevent the king from minting more currency, thereby depreciating the circulating value of the current coins.

== History ==
During the Middle Ages, "the currency belongs to the prince and is held as another patrimonial asset of the crown." This prerogative was protected by the doctrine of jurists of the time until it was questioned by Nicolas Oresme, Rector of the College of Navarre in Paris and bishop of Lisieux who claimed that "the currency belongs, by reason of its ends, to the community."

For the historian Juan Carrasco Pérez, the first mention "of the coinage corresponds to the County of Catalonia, contained in a document of Ramón Berenguer III and dated in 1118." In this context, he claims, "it could be imagined that similar policies would be followed, with all the variables one wants, in the kingdom of Aragon and, of course, in the kingdom of Pamplona under its dynastic union (1076-1134), whose sovereigns promoted the expansion of urban life, the increase in commercial activity and, therefore, of the monetary economy."

The coinage was introduced by Pedro II around the year 1205 to the displeasure of the kingdom both as a new tax and for the burden it caused since it was satisfied at the rate of twelve dinars per pound, although it was later reduced. In the time of Juan I, it was fixed at an amount that did not exceed one maravedí, estimated at seven sueldos, which was paid every seven years by those who owned real estate or movable goods valued at more than 70 sueldos.

Nor was much obtained from this income both because the places of the military orders only paid half and nothing was paid by the lordships, as well as the exemptions enjoyed by some cities and towns and having redeemed others from this contribution and having alienated the Kings' right to collect it in favor of some churches and lords.

== Bibliography ==
- Carrasco Pérez, Juan (2011). "The coinage tax in the kingdom of Navarre (ca. 1243-1355): taxation, demography, monetary history". Príncipe de Viana. 72 (252): 55–161. ISSN 0032-8472.
