= Prince of Viana =

Spanish title

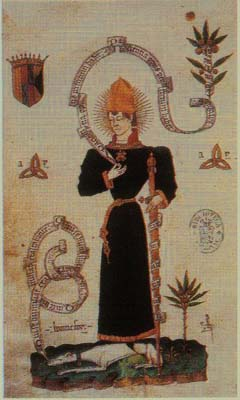
Portrait of Prince Charles of Viana

The Prince or Princess of Viana (Spanish: Príncipe de Viana, Basque: Vianako Printzea) is one of the titles of the heir of the Crown of Spain. Other associated titles originate from the rest of the kingdoms that formed Spain: Prince of Asturias, Prince of Girona, Duke of Montblanc, Count of Cervera and Lord of Balaguer.

== History ==
Originally it was the title of the heir of the Kingdom of Navarre. It was instituted by Charles III for his grandson Charles, born of the marriage between his daughter Blanche I of Navarre and John II of Aragon. The title was used also for Gaston, the son and heir of Eleanor of Navarre and Gaston IV of Foix. Its creation and use was a reflection of a Western European trend of bestowing upon the heirs of a kingdom rents for his personal benefit. In pre-unification Spain, the comparable titles were Prince of Asturias, in Castile and Prince of Girona, in Aragon. In other European states, similar titles included Dauphin, in France, Prince of Beira or Prince of Brazil, in Portugal and Prince of Wales, in England.

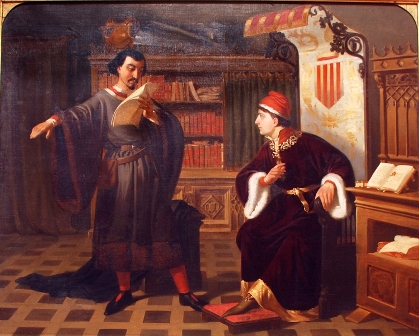
Agustí Rigalt Cortiella, Ausias March and the prince of Viana, 1852.

Due to several historical events, such as the 15th century dynastic union of Spain between Isabella I of Castile and Ferdinand II of Aragon, as well as the early 16th century invasion and annexation of Navarre by Ferdinand II of Aragon, the title lost its importance. This was exacerbated when the Kingdom of Navarre ended up divided between the Kingdom of France and the Kingdom of Spain. While the title "Prince of Viana" has recently been revived, Viana itself no longer provides the heir with an income. Rather, it symbolizes the historical continuity of the former Crown of Navarre within the united Spanish monarchy. The current holder of the Principality of Viana is Princess Leonor, daughter of Felipe VI of Spain and Queen Letizia. Leonor also uses the rest of the traditional titles of the heir of the Spanish Crown: Prince of Asturias, Prince of Girona, Duke of Montblanc and Lord of Balaguer.

There are still a few people left with the royal surname of Viana, though they no longer have the Spanish Throne.
