= Order of the Aztec Eagle =

Highest rank of the Mexican Honours System

Mexican Order of the Aztec Eagle
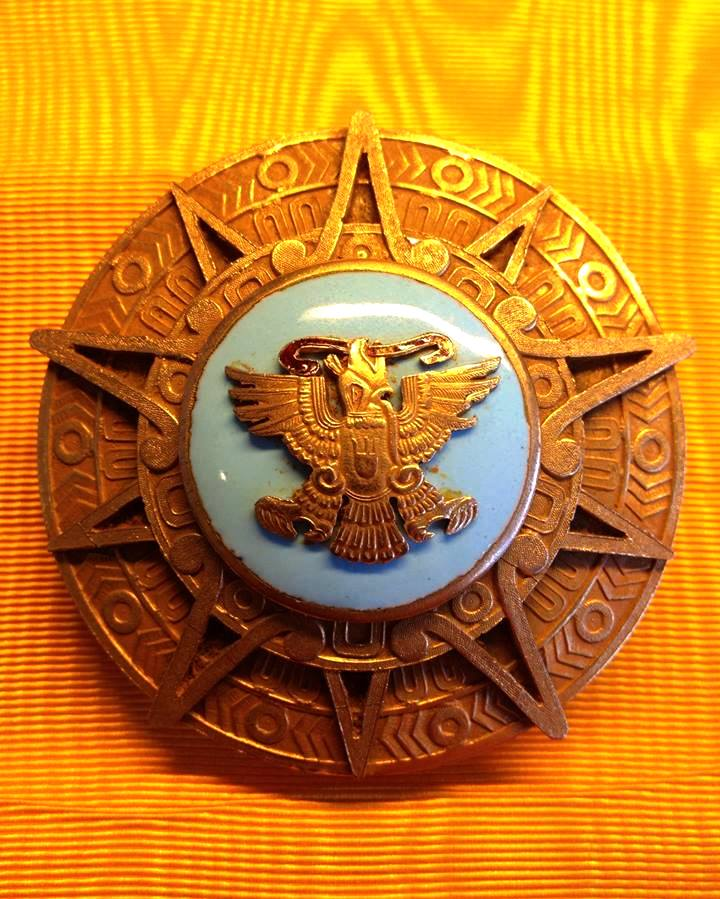
- The Order of the Aztec Eagle (Star)

Awarded by Mexico
- Type: Order
- Established: 1933; 93 years ago
- Awarded for: Services given to Mexico or to mankind
- Status: Currently awarded
- Grades: Collar; Sash of Special Category; Sash; Plaque; Venera; Insignia
- Ribbon of the Order of the Aztec Eagle

The Mexican Order of the Aztec Eagle (Spanish: Orden Mexicana del Águila Azteca) forms part of the Mexican Honors System and is the highest Mexican order awarded to foreigners.

== History ==
It was created by decree on December 29, 1933, by President Abelardo L. Rodríguez as a reward to the services given to Mexico or humankind by foreigners. It corresponds to similar distinctions given to Mexican citizens such as the Condecoración Miguel Hidalgo or the Belisario Domínguez Medal of Honor. It is given by the office of the foreign minister on the instructions of a Council established for this purpose headed by the President. Its naming is partially taken from the Imperial Order of the Mexican Eagle, which was created by Maximilian I of Mexico on January 1, 1865.

== Design ==
There is some design similarity of the order with the coat of arms of Mexico, particularly the golden eagle holding a rattlesnake, which is associated with the Aztec civilization.

== Classes ==
=== Since 2011 ===
Since the reform of March 2011, the classes are :

1. Collar ("Collar"), awarded to heads of state;
2. Sash of Special Category ("Banda en Categoría Especial"), awarded to prime ministers and heads of government, hereditary princes(ses), consorts of heads of state, or to people whose category is tantamount to the previous;
3. Sash ("Banda"), awarded to government ministers, secretaries, members of royal families, ambassadors, or individuals whose category is tantamount to the previous;
4. Plaque ("Placa"), awarded to government undersecretaries, plenipotentiary ministers, consuls general, brigadier generals, rear admirals, as well to those whose category is tantamount to the previous;
5. Venera (a type of insignia), awarded to ad hoc business representatives, colonels and lieutenant colonels, captains of a ship, equivalent servants of embassies in Mexico, as well to those whose category is tantamount to the previous;
6. Insignia, awarded to ad interim business representatives and other members of diplomatic missions; captain, navy lieutenant, as well to those whose category is tantamount to the previous and to those cases the Council considers pertinent.

All grades except the collar may be awarded, at the Council's discretion, to distinguished foreigners.

=== Before 2011 ===
Prior to the 2011 reform, the classes were, in descending order:

1. Collar ("Collar"), awarded to heads of state;
2. Grand Cross ("Cruz"), awarded to prime ministers and heads of government
3. Sash ("Banda"), awarded to government ministers, secretaries and ambassadors
4. Medal ("Medalla"), awarded to government undersecretaries, plenipotentiary ministers, as well to those whose category is tantamount to the previous;
5. Plaque ("Placa"), awarded to ad hoc business representatives, colonels and lieutenant colonels, captains of a ship, equivalent servants of embassies in Mexico), as well to those whose category is tantamount to the previous;
6. Venera (a type of insignia), awarded to ad interim business representatives and other members of diplomatic missions;
7. Insignia proper, awarded at the Council's discretion; and
8. Honorable Mention ("Mención Honorífica").

== Notable recipients ==
=== Royalty ===
Name	Class	Nationality	Year Appointed	Reference
Emperor Haile Selassie I of Ethiopia	Collar	Ethiopian Empire	1954	
Emperor Hirohito of Japan	Collar	Japan	1962	
Prince Philip, Duke of Edinburgh	Collar	United Kingdom	1964	
King Rama IX of Thailand	Collar	Thailand	1972	
Queen Elizabeth II of the United Kingdom	Collar	United Kingdom	1973	
Prince Richard, Duke of Gloucester	Sash; Sash of Special Category	United Kingdom	1974; 2015	
Princess Marina, Duchess of Kent	Grand Cross	United Kingdom	1964	
Mohammed Reza Shah Pahlavi of Iran	Collar	Iran	1975	
King Olav V of Norway	Grand Cross	Norway		
King Juan Carlos I of Spain	Collar	Spain		
Queen Sofía of Spain	Grand Cross	Spain		
Emperor Akihito of Japan	Collar	Japan		
King Albert II of Belgium	Collar	Belgium		
King Carl Gustaf XVI of Sweden	Collar	Sweden	2004	
Queen Silvia of Sweden	Sash	Sweden	2004	
King Mohammed VI of Morocco	Collar	Morocco	2005	
Queen Margrethe II of Denmark	Collar	Denmark	2008	
Henrik, Prince Consort of Denmark	Sash (2008); Sash of Special Category (2016)	Denmark	2008; 2016	
Queen Beatrix of the Netherlands	Collar	Netherlands	2009	
King Willem-Alexander of the Netherlands	Sash	Netherlands	2009	
Queen Máxima of the Netherlands	Sash	Netherlands	2009	
Felipe VI of Spain	Sash (1996); Collar (2015)	Spain	1996; 2015	
Queen Letizia of Spain	Sash (2008); Sash of Special Category (2015)	Spain	2008; 2015	
King Charles III of the United Kingdom	Sash of Special Category	United Kingdom	2015	
Queen Camilla of the United Kingdom	Sash	United Kingdom	2015	
Andrew Mountbatten-Windsor	Sash	United Kingdom	2015	
Sophie, Duchess of Edinburgh	Sash	United Kingdom	2015	
Birgitte, Duchess of Gloucester	Sash	United Kingdom	2015	
Frederik X of Denmark	Sash of Special Category	Denmark	2016	
Queen Mary of Denmark	Sash	Denmark	2016	
Prince Joachim of Denmark	Sash	Denmark	2016	
Princess Marie of Denmark	Sash	Denmark	2016	
Princess Benedikte of Denmark	Sash	Denmark	2016	
Emir Sabah Al-Ahmad Al-Jaber Al-Sabah	Collar	Kuwait	2016	
King Salman of Saudi Arabia	Collar	Saudi Arabia	2016	

=== Presidents ===
- (First Czechoslovak Republic) Edvard Beneš – Collar (1935)
- (United States) Dwight David Eisenhower – Collar (1945)
- (Taiwan) Chiang Kai-shek – Collar (1945)
- (India) Sarvepalli Radhakrishnan – Collar (1954)
- (Cuba) Fulgencio Batista - Collar
- (Brazil) Juscelino Kubitschek – Collar
- (Dominican Republic) Rafael Trujillo – Collar
- (France) Charles de Gaulle – Collar
- (Socialist Federal Republic of Yugoslavia) Josip Broz Tito – Collar (1963)
- (Tanzania) Julius Nyerere – Collar (1975)
- (Bulgaria) Todor Zhivkov
- (Cuba) Fidel Castro – Collar (1988)
- (Estonia) Lennart Meri – Collar (1995)
- (Brazil) Luiz Inácio Lula da Silva – Collar (2007)
- (Chile) Michelle Bachelet – Collar (2007)
- (South Africa) Nelson Mandela – Sash (2010)
- (Guatemala) Álvaro Colom – Collar (2011)
- (El Salvador) Mauricio Funes – Collar (2011)
- (Colombia) Juan Manuel Santos – Collar (2011)
- (Uruguay) José Mujica – Collar (2014)
- (Brazil) Dilma Rousseff – Collar (2015)
- (Guatemala) Otto Pérez Molina – Collar (2015)
- (Argentina) Mauricio Macri – Collar (2016)
- (Italy) Sergio Mattarella – Collar (2016)
- (Portugal) Marcelo Rebelo de Sousa – Collar (2017)
- (India) Pratibha Patil – Sash of Special Category (2018)
- (Philippines) Manuel Luis Quezon – Collar
- (Cuba) Miguel Díaz-Canel – Collar (2023)

=== Politicians ===
- (Indonesia) Johannes Leimena
- (Belgium) Edmond Leburton
- (Soviet Union) Alexandra Kollontai – Sash (1944)
- (United States) Henry Harley Arnold – Collar (1945)
- (Socialist Federal Republic of Yugoslavia) Dr. Jože Brilej – Sash (1950s)
- (Japan) Takeo Miki – Sash (1967)
- (United Kingdom) Sir Edward Heath (1994)
- (Guatemala) Bernardo Arévalo (1995)
- (Canada) Yves Ducharme – Venera (2006)
- (United States) Mark Shurtleff, Utah Attorney General – Plaque (2006)
- (Belize) Lisa Shoman – Sash (2008)
- (United States) Ted Kennedy – Sash (2008)
- (Spain) José Manuel García-Margallo (2015)
- (France) Benoît Hamon
- (Argentina) Eva Perón (1951)
- (United States) David Dreier (2017)
- (United States) Jared Kushner – Sash (2018)
- (China) Qiu Xiaoqi - Sash (2019)
- (France) Jean-Yves Le Drian – Sash (2021)
- (Chile) Isabel Allende Bussi – Insignia (2023)

=== Other ===
- (United States) Walt Disney (1943)
- (United States) Spencer Atkinson (1946)
- (United States) Norman Borlaug (1970)
- (United States) Nettie Lee Benson (1979)
- (United Kingdom) Nigel Davies (1980)
- (United States) Edward Hidalgo (1980)
- (United Kingdom) Diana Kennedy (1981)
- (Colombia) Gabriel García Márquez (1982)
- (Chile) Claudio Arrau (1982)
- (Spain) Plácido Domingo – (1985)
- (United States) W. Michael Mathes (1985)
- (United States) Cesar Chavez (1990)
- (United States) Merle Greene Robertson (1993)
- (United States) Dr. Donald Winkelmann (1994)
- (Soviet Union) Yuri Knorozov (1995)
- (Mexico) Hector P. Garcia (1998)
- (India) Satish Gujral – Insignia proper
- (United States) Charles Butt – (2001)
- (United States) Melinda Gates – Insignia proper (2007)
- (United States) Anne d'Harnoncourt – Insignia proper (2007)
- (Guatemala) Rigoberta Menchú – Insignia proper (2010)
- (Peru) Mario Vargas Llosa (2011)
- (India) Amartya Sen (2011)
- (Republic of Ireland) Bono – Insignia proper (2012)
- (Japan) Takashi Yamanouchi (2013)
- (United States) Ralph Roeder
- (United Kingdom) Lady Susan Hussey (2015)
- (United States) Dolores Huerta (2015)
- (United States) Richard W. Fisher – Badge (2015)
- (United Kingdom) Stuart Gulliver (2017)
- (United States) Roderic Ai Camp (2017)
- (United States) Rick Bayless – Insignia (2017)
- (United States) Roberta S. Jacobson (2018)
- (France) Catherine Bréchignac (2018)
- (United States) Stephen A. Schwarzman – Plaque (2018)
- (United States) Henry Kravis – Plaque (2018)
- (Italy) Roberto Riccardi – Plaque (2021)

== List by class ==
List of recipients of the Order of the Aztec Eagle by class

Collar

- Akihito
- Bhumibol Adulyadej
- Michelle Bachelet
- Beatrix of the Netherlands
- Josip Broz Tito
- Carl XVI Gustaf
- Fidel Castro
- Edvard Beneš
- Dwight D. Eisenhower
- Elizabeth II
- Cristina Fernández de Kirchner
- Mauricio Funes
- Prince Richard, Duke of Gloucester
- Haile Selassie
- Henryk Jabłoński
- Juan Carlos I of Spain
- Juscelino Kubitschek
- Luiz Inácio Lula da Silva
- Mauricio Macri
- Margrethe II of Denmark
- Mohammed VI of Morocco
- Mohammad Reza Pahlavi
- Salman of Saudi Arabia
- Sarvepalli Radhakrishnan

Grand Cross / Sash of Special Category

- Henry H. Arnold
- Princess Benedikte of Denmark
- Jože Brilej
- Maria Cavaco Silva
- Armand De Decker
- Guillermo Fernández de Soto
- Jean Gol
- Peter Hope (diplomat)
- Thanat Khoman
- Princess Lalla Hasna of Morocco
- Edmond Leburton
- Mahathir Mohamad
- Princess Margriet of the Netherlands
- Princess Marina of Greece and Denmark
- Prince Moulay Rachid of Morocco
- Charles-Ferdinand Nothomb
- Olav V of Norway
- Jacques van Ypersele de Strihou
- Ra'ad bin Zeid
- Suharto
- Pratibha Patil

Sash

- Infante Carlos, Duke of Calabria
- Charles, Prince of Wales
- Infanta Cristina of Spain
- Carlos Echeverri Cortés
- Felipe VI of Spain
- Henrik, Prince Consort of Denmark
- Princess Irene of the Netherlands
- Ted Kennedy
- Alexandra Kollontai
- Queen Letizia of Spain
- Nelson Mandela
- Queen Máxima of the Netherlands
- Takeo Miki
- Hirofumi Nakasone
- Sadako Ogata
- Pietro Parolin
- Prince Sahle Selassie
- Lisa Shoman
- Queen Sofía of Spain

Plaque

- Bill Gates
- Charles E. Wilhelm
- Alan Yarrow

Insignia

- David Brading
- Melinda Gates
- Satish Gujral
- Anne d'Harnoncourt
- Alan Knight (historian)

Other or unknown classes

- Claudio Arrau
- Jack Austin (politician)
- Rick Bayless
- Nettie Lee Benson
- Elizabeth Hill Boone
- David Brading
- Jože Brilej
- Charles Butt
- David Carrasco
- Maria Cavaco Silva
- Alfredo Chiaradía
- Francesco Cossiga
- Nigel Davies (historian)
- Michel Descombey
- Plácido Domingo
- Yves Ducharme
- Elżbieta Dzikowska
- Luis Echeverría
- Trevor Eyton
- Jean-Louis Georgelin
- Nadine Gordimer
- John Greenslade
- António Guterres
- Jan Hendrix
- Edward Hidalgo
- Carla Anderson Hills
- Alfred Wilkinson Johnson
- Michael Kaiser
- Friedrich Katz
- Diana Kennedy
- Jean-Pierre Kingsley
- Nobusuke Kishi
- Yuri Knorozov
- Thomas Krens
- Ernest Krogh-Hansen
- George Kubler
- Jared Kushner
- Luis Leal (writer)
- Fred Martinez
- W. Michael Mathes
- Helmut Maucher
- José Carlos Millás
- Million Dollar Theater
- Paula Marcela Moreno Zapata
- Julius Nyerere
- Óscar Osorio
- Benoît Puga
- Mariano Rajoy
- Ann Richards
- Nelson Rockefeller
- Rodman Rockefeller
- Albert Sabin
- Eisaku Satō
- Walter Schwimmer
- Edward Seaga
- David Shaltiel
- Lemuel C. Shepherd Jr.
- Innis P. Swift
- Hugh Thomas, Baron Thomas of Swynnerton
- J. Eric S. Thompson
- Mario Vargas Llosa
- Baldemar Velasquez
- William Wasson
- David J. Weber
- Eliot Weinberger
- Derry Weis
- Raul Yzaguirre
- Amartya Sen
- Tom Tollemache

== Gallery ==
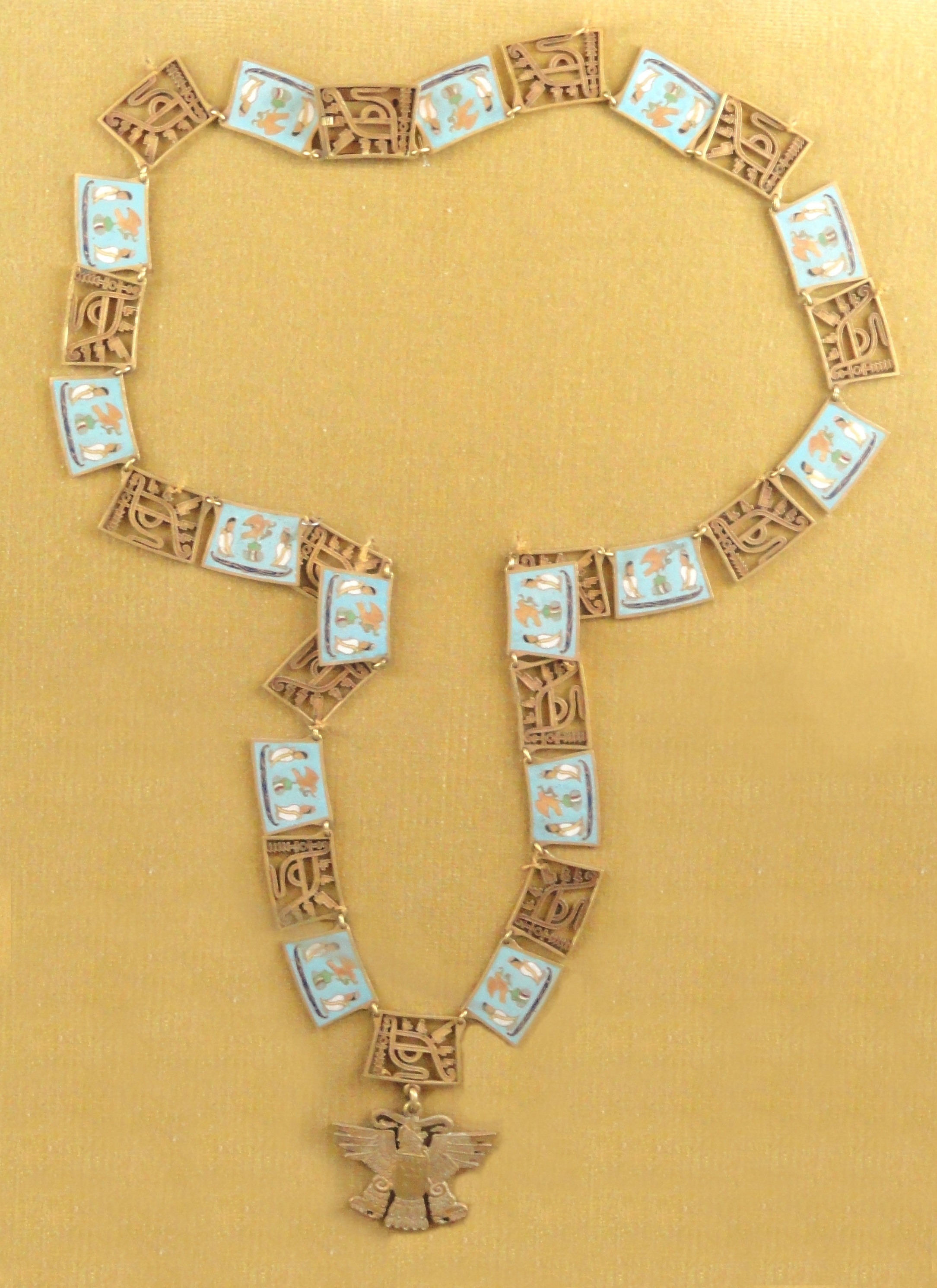
Collar of the Order of the Aztec Eagle

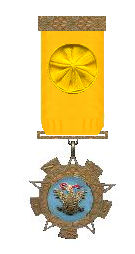
Insignia of the Mexican Order of the Aztec Eagle

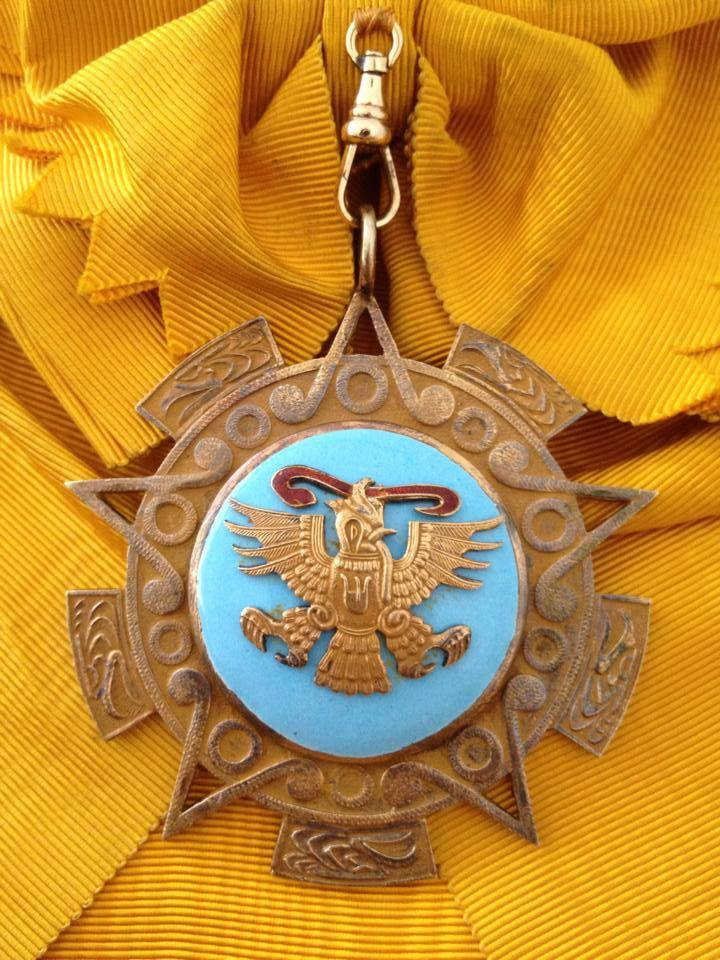
Sash and sash badge of the Order of the Aztec Eagle

== Additional sources ==
- Mexican Chamber of Deputies
- Olvera Ayes, David A. "La Orden Mexicana del Aguila Azteca – Apuntes para su Historia". Cuadernos del Cronista. México, 2011
