= Prince of Girona =

Title accorded to the heir apparent or heir presumptive to the Crown of Aragon

Shield of Princes of Girona

The Prince or Princess of Girona (Catalan: Príncep o Princesa de Girona, Spanish: Príncipe o Princesa de Gerona) is one of the titles of the heir of the Crown of Spain. The title was historically accorded to the heir apparent or heir presumptive to the Crown of Aragon. Current legislation mandates the title of Prince of Asturias to the heir of the Spanish throne but allows for the use of other traditional titles; the current title-holder, therefore, is Leonor, Princess of Girona.

== Origin of the title ==
It originated in 1351 when King Peter IV of Aragon named his successor, to whom he conceded the title of Duke of Girona; the title embraced territories of the counties of Girona, Besalú, Empúries and Ausona.

In part I of the Constitucions i Altres Drets de Cathalunya, the section headed Genealogia dels Reys d'Aragó i Comtes de Barcelona speaks of the genealogy of John I of Aragon, son of Peter IV, saying that John and Violant had a son named James, "lo qual intitularen Delphi [Dauphin] de Girona". On 19 February 1416, Ferdinand I of Aragon, considering the title of duke insufficient, raised it to the rank of Principality of Girona. However, these titles fell into gradual disuse until the 20th century as the heir of the King of Spain became better known by the hereditary title of the Crown of Castile, "Prince of Asturias."

== Modern usage ==
In 1961, when announcing the wedding the future Juan Carlos I of Spain and Sofia of Greece, the Spanish Royal House issued the young prince, as titles of pretense, the style of "Prince of Asturias," "Prince of Girona," and "Prince of Viana" — these three titles referring to his status as heir apparent to the kingdoms of Castile, Aragon and Navarre respectively. He started using the titles of "Prince of Girona" on his passport during the rule of caudillo Franco, to avoid the more contentious title Prince of Asturias which was well known to be reserved for the heir of the throne of Spain. His father had adopted a similar tactic, styling himself Juan, Count of Barcelona; using the title of King of Spain would have been seen as directly subversive of the Francoist state. However, calling himself Count of Barcelona was a clear attempt at asserting his hereditary rights to then defunct Spanish throne, as there had been no Count of Barcelona who was not either King of Aragon or of Spain since the Middle Ages.

When Juan Carlos was finally given an official capacity in the Spanish state as heir to the kingdom by General Franco, he received the title of "Prince of Spain" and thus began to use this until he became King of Spain. On 21 January 1977 his son, Felipe, would be the first to use all of these titles in any official capacity for over 250 years.

With the accession of Felipe to the throne in 2014, his elder daughter Leonor became Princess of Girona, as heiress presumptive to the throne of Aragon. The Princess of Girona Foundation was created in 2009 and is now run on behalf of Princess Leonor: it funds programmes to aid young people.

== Holders ==
Picture	Name	Heir of	Birth	Became heir to the Crown	Created Duke of Girona	Ceased to be Duke of Girona	Death	Other titles before/whilst Duke	Princess of Girona
	Infante Juan later John I	Peter IV	27 December 1350		1351	6 January 1387 became King	19 May 1396	Count of Cervera	Martha of Armagnac
	Infante Juan later John I	Peter IV	27 December 1350		1351	6 January 1387 became King	19 May 1396	Count of Cervera	Yolande of Bar
	Infante James	John I	1382	6 January 1387		1388		Count of Cervera	
	Infante Ferdinand	John I	1389			October 1389		Count of Cervera	
	Infante Peter	John I	1394			1394		Count of Cervera	
	Infante Alfonso later Alfonso V	Ferdinand I	1396	25 June 1412	January 1414	19 February 1416; Raised to Principality	27 June 1458	Count of Cervera	Maria of Castile
	Prince Charles	John II	29 May 1421	27 June 1458		23 September 1461		Prince of Viana; Duke of Gandia; Duke of Montblanc; Count of Cervera	
	Prince Ferdinand later Ferdinand II	John II	10 March 1452	23 September 1461 brother's death		20 January 1479 became King	23 January 1516	Duke of Montblanc; Count of Cervera; Lord of Balaguer; Duke of Gandia; Count of Ribagorza; King of Sicily; King of Castile and León; King of Upper Navarre	Isabella I of Castile
	Prince John, Duke of Lorraine (claimant)	René	2 August 1424	1466		16 December 1470		Duke of Lorraine; Duke of Calabria; Marquis of Pont-à-Mousson; Duke of Montblanc; Count of Cervera	Marie of Bourbon
	Prince Nicholas, Duke of Lorraine (claimant)	René	7 July 1448	16 December 1470		27 July 1473		Duke of Lorraine; Titular Duke of Calabria; Marquis of Pont-à-Mousson; Duke of Montblanc; Count of Cervera	-
	Prince Juan	Ferdinand II	28 June 1478	20 January 1479		4 October 1497		Prince of Asturias; Prince of Viana; Duke of Montblanc; Count of Cervera; Lord of Balaguer	Margaret of Austria
	Prince Miguel	Ferdinand II	24 August 1498	28 August 1498		19 July 1500		Prince of Portugal; Prince of Asturias; Prince of Viana; Duke of Montblanc; Count of Cervera; Lord of Balaguer	-
	Infanta Joanna later Joanna I	Ferdinand II	6 November 1479	1502 recognized by the Aragonese Cortes at Zaragoza		3 May 1509 brother's birth	12 April 1555	Princess of Asturias; Princess of Viana; Duchess of Montblanc; Countess of Cervera; Lady of Balaguer; Duchess consort of Burgundy, Brabant, Limburg, Lothier, Luxembourg; Countess consort of Artois, Flanders, Charolais, Hainaut, Holland, Zeeland, Burgundy; Margravine consort of Namur	Philip, Duke of Burgundy and Lord of the Netherlands
	Prince John	Ferdinand II	3 May 1509					Duke of Montblanc; Count of Cervera; Lord of Balaguer	-
	Infanta Joanna later Joanna I	Ferdinand II	6 November 1479	3 May 1509 brother's death		23 January 1516 became Queen-regnant	12 April 1555	Queen of Castile and León; Duchess of Montblanc; Countess of Cervera; Lady of Balaguer; Duchess consort of Burgundy, Brabant, Limburg, Lothier, Luxembourg; Countess consort of Artois, Flanders, Charolais, Hainaut, Holland, Zeeland, Burgundy; Margravine consort of Namur	-
	Prince Charles later Charles I	Joanna I	24 February 1500	23 January 1516		14 March 1516 became King	21 September 1558	Prince of Asturias; Prince of Viana; Duke of Montblanc; Count of Cervera; Lord of Balaguer; Prince of Viana; Duke of Burgundy, Brabant, Limburg, Lothier and Luxembourg, Count of Artois, Burgundy, Flanders, Hainaut, Holland, Namur and Zeeland	-
	Prince Philip later Philip II	Charles I	21 May 1527			16 January 1556 became King	13 September 1598	Prince of Asturias; Prince of Viana; Duke of Montblanc; Count of Cervera; Lord of Balaguer; King of Naples; King of England and Ireland; Duke of Milan	Maria Manuela, Princess of Portugal
	Prince Philip later Philip II	Charles I	21 May 1527			16 January 1556 became King	13 September 1598	Prince of Asturias; Prince of Viana; Duke of Montblanc; Count of Cervera; Lord of Balaguer; King of Naples; King of England and Ireland; Duke of Milan	Mary I of England
	Prince Carlos	Philip II	8 July 1545	16 January 1556		24 July 1568		Prince of Asturias; Prince of Viana; Duke of Montblanc; Count of Cervera; Lord of Balaguer	-
	Prince Ferdinand	Philip II	4 December 1571			18 October 1578		Prince of Asturias; Prince of Viana; Duke of Montblanc; Count of Cervera; Lord of Balaguer	-
	Prince Diego	Philip II	15 August 1575	18 October 1578 brother's death		21 November 1582		Prince of Asturias; Prince of Viana; Duke of Montblanc; Count of Cervera; Lord of Balaguer; Prince of Portugal	-
	Prince Philip later Philip III	Philip II	14 April 1578	21 November 1582 brother's death		14 April 1598 became King	31 March 1621	Prince of Asturias; Prince of Viana; Duke of Montblanc; Count of Cervera; Lord of Balaguer; Prince of Portugal	-
	Prince Philip later Philip IV	Philip III	8 April 1605			31 March 1621 became King	17 September 1665	Prince of Asturias; Prince of Viana; Duke of Montblanc; Count of Cervera; Lord of Balaguer; Prince of Portugal	Elisabeth of Bourbon
	Prince Baltasar Carlos	Philip IV	17 October 1629			9 October 1646		Prince of Asturias; Prince of Viana; Duke of Montblanc; Count of Cervera; Lord of Balaguer; Prince of Portugal	-
	Prince Philip Prospero	Philip IV	20 November 1657			1 November 1661		Prince of Asturias; Prince of Viana; Duke of Montblanc; Count of Cervera; Lord of Balaguer	-
	Prince Charles later Charles II	Philip IV	6 November 1661			17 September 1665 became King	1 November 1700	Prince of Asturias; Prince of Viana; Duke of Montblanc; Count of Cervera; Lord of Balaguer	-
	Prince Felipe later Felipe VI	Juan Carlos I	30 January 1968	22 November 1975	21 January 1977	19 June 2014	living	Prince of Asturias; Prince of Viana; Duke of Montblanc; Count of Cervera; Lord of Balaguer	Letizia Ortiz Rocasolano
	Princess Leonor	Felipe VI	31 October 2005	19 June 2014	19 June 2014	Incumbent	living	Princess of Asturias; Princess of Viana; Duchess of Montblanc; Countess of Cervera; Lady of Balaguer	

== See also ==
- Count of Girona
- Princess of Girona
- List of titles and honours of the Heir Apparent to the Spanish Throne
