= Order of the Liberator General San Martín =

Decoration of Argentina

Order of the Liberator General San Martin Orden del Libertador General San Martín

Awarded by Argentina
- Type: Order
- Established: 17 August 1943
- Status: Currently awarded
- Grades: Collar; Grand Cross; Grand Officer; Commander; Officer; Member

Precedence
- Next (lower): Order of May
- Ribbon bar of the order

The Order of the Liberator General San Martín (Spanish: Orden del Libertador General San Martín) is the highest decoration in Argentina. It is awarded to foreign politicians or military, deemed worthy of the highest recognition from Argentina. It is granted by the sitting President of Argentina.

== History ==
It owes its name to General José de San Martín, called Father of the Nation and Liberator. The original design was made by the Argentine engineer and sculptor Ángel Eusebio Ibarra García. It was created by Decree No. 5,000 of 17 August 1943; amended by Law No. 13. 202 of 21 May 1948; which in turn was repealed by Decree Law No. 16.628 of 17 December 1957, which re-creates the Order. The modifications introduced were only in the form. The regulations still in force were approved by Decree No. 16,643 of 18 December 1967.

== Grades ==
The Order is issued in a number of grades. These are:

- Collar (Spanish: Collar)
- Grand Cross (Spanish: Gran Cruz)
- Grand Officer (Spanish: Gran Oficial)
- Commander (Spanish: Comendador)
- Officer (Spanish: Oficial)
- Knight (Spanish: Caballero)

== Notable recipients ==
Date	Recipient	Grade
8 June 1947	Spain – Caudillo Francisco Franco (1936–1975)	Collar
16 August 1947	Brazil – President Eurico Gaspar Dutra (1946–1951)	Collar
20 December 1948	Chile – Former president Arturo Alessandri (1920–1925; 1932-1938)	Grand Cross
1950	Peru – President Manuel Arturo Odría (1948–1950; 1950-1956)	Collar
12 May 1950	United States – General Dwight Eisenhower (1953–1961)	Grand Cross
4 April 1951	Netherlands – Prince Bernhard (1948–1980)	Grand Cross
18 July 1952	Argentina – First Lady Eva Duarte de Perón (1946–1952)	Extraordinary
19 February 1953	Chile – President Carlos Ibáñez del Campo (1927–1931; 1952–1958)	Collar
15 August 1954	Paraguay – President Alfredo Stroessner (1954–1989)	Collar
2 February 1959	Italy – Prime Minister Antonio Segni (1955–1957; 1959–1960)	Grand Cross
1960	Belgium – King Baudouin (1951–1993)	Collar
8 May 1960	France – President Charles De Gaulle (1959–1969)	Collar
June 1960	Germany – Chancellor Konrad Adenauer (1949–1963)	Grand Cross
1 July 1960	Netherlands – Queen Juliana (1948–1980)	Collar
4 July 1960	United Kingdom – Queen Elizabeth II (1952–2022)	Collar
October 1960	Taiwan – President Chiang Kai-shek (1950–1975)	Collar
9 April 1961	Italy – President Giovanni Gronchi (1955–1962)	Collar
8 July 1961	Bolivia – President Víctor Paz Estenssoro (1952–1956; 1960–1964; 1985–1989)	Collar
8 December 1961	Thailand – King Bhumibol Adulyadej (1946–2016)	Collar
8 December 1961	Thailand – Queen Sirikit (1950–2016)	Grand Cross
8 December 1961	Thailand – Prime Minister Sarit Thanarat (1959–1963)	Grand Cross
22 March 1962	United Kingdom – Prince Philip (1952–2021)	Grand Cross
10 May 1965	Iran – Shah Mohammad Reza Pahlavi (1941–1979)	Collar
10 May 1965	Iran – Shahbanu Farah Pahlavi (1961–1979)	Grand Cross
15 September 1965	Italy – President Giuseppe Saragat (1964–1971)	Collar
29 October 1965	Chile – President Eduardo Frei Montalva (1964–1970)	Collar
1966	Cambodia – King Norodom Sihanouk (1941–1970, 1993-2004)	Collar
25 March 1966	Denmark – Princess Margrethe (1940–1972; Queen: 1972–2024)	Grand Cross
9 September 1966	Japan – Prime Minister Satō Eisaku (1964–1972)	Grand Cross
18 September 1967	Norway – King Olav V (1957–1991)	Collar
1970	(Ethiopian Empire) Ethiopia – Emperor Haile Selassie (1930–1974)	Collar
18 April 1971	Costa Rica – President José Figueres Ferrer (1948–1949; 1953–1958; 1970–1974)	Collar
13 October 1971	Peru – President Juan Velasco Alvaro (1968–1975)	Collar
1972	South Korea – President Park Chung-hee (1963-1979)	Collar
1972	Indonesia – President Suharto (1968-1998)	Collar
1972	Indonesia – First Lady Siti Hartinah (1968-1998)	Grand Cross
16 June 1973	Spain – President Luis Carrero Blanco (1973)	Grand Cross
5 March 1974	Italy – Gran Maestre P-2 Licio Gelli (1973)	Grand Cross
5 March 1974	Romania – President Nicolae Ceausescu (1967–1989)	Collar
5 March 1974	Romania – First Lady Elena Ceausescu (1974–1989)	Grand Cross
1976	Chile – President Augusto Pinochet (1973-1990) / Revoked by President Alberto Fernández.	Grand Cross
4 March 1978	Peru – President Francisco Morales Bermúdez (1975–1980)	Collar
1 December 1978	Spain – King Juan Carlos I (1975–2014)	Collar
1 December 1978	Spain – Queen Sofía (1975–2014)	Grand Cross
8 October 1979	Japan – Emperor Hirohito (1926–1989)	Collar
7 June 1985	Peru – President Fernando Belaúnde Terry (1963–1968; 1980–1985)	Collar
17 July 1986	Philippines – President Corazon Aquino (1986–1992)	Collar
19 July 1986	Saudi Arabia – King Fahd (1982–2005)	Collar
28 July 1986	Brazil – President José Sarney (1985–1990)	Collar
5 July 1990	Brazil – President Fernando Collor de Mello (1990–1992)	Collar
27 August 1990	Chile – President Patricio Aylwin (1990–1994)	Collar
1991	Malaysia – Prime Minister Mahathir Mohamad (1981–2003, 2018-2020)	Grand Cross
1992	Morocco – King Hassan II (1961–1999)	Collar
1992	Jordan – King Hussein (1952–1999)	Collar
11 May 1992	Egypt – President Hosni Moubarak (1981–2011)	Collar
27 March 1994	Spain – Infanta Elena (1963–1995)	Grand Cross
27 March 1994	Spain – Infanta Cristina (1965–1997)	Grand Cross
6 May 1994	Belgium – Prince Philippe (1993–2013)	Grand Cross
1 December 1994	Croatia – President Franjo Tuđman (1990–1999)	Collar
21 February 1995	Poland – President Lech Wałęsa (1990–1995)	Collar
24 February 1995	South Africa – President Nelson Mandela (1994–1999)	Collar
31 May 1995	Austria – President Thomas Klestil (1992–2004)	Collar
14 March 1996	Lithuania – President Algirdas Brazauskas (1992–1998)	Collar
8 April 1996	Brazil – President Fernando Henrique Cardoso (1995–2002)	Collar
16 July 1996	Laos – President Nouhak Phoumsavanh (1992–1998)	Collar
27 September 1996	Czech Republic – President Václav Havel (1993–2003)	Collar
12 November 1996	Mexico – President Ernesto Zedillo (1994–2000)	Collar
3 March 1997	Finland – President Martti Ahtisaari (1994–2000)	Collar
7 April 1997	Hungary – President Árpád Göncz (1990–2000)	Collar
9 April 1997	Thailand – Prime Minister Chavalit Yongchaiyudh (1996–1997)	Grand Cross
21 April 1997	Spain – President José María Aznar (1996–2004)	Grand Cross
28 April 1997	Haiti – President René Préval (1996–2001; 2006-2011)	Collar
26 May 1998	Sweden – King Carl XVI Gustav (1973–incumbent)	Collar
26 May 1998	Sweden – Queen Silvia (1976–incumbent)	Grand Cross
26 May 1998	Sweden – Princess Lilian (1976–2013)	Grand Cross
16 July 1998	United Nations – Secretary-General Kofi Annan (1997–2006)	Grand Cross
10 August 1998	Nicaragua – President Arnoldo Alemán (1997–2002)	Collar
29 September 1998	Japan – Prince Akishino (1990–Incumbent)	Grand Cross
2 December 1998	Japan – Emperor Akihito (1989–2019)	Collar
2 December 1998	Japan – Empress Michiko (1989–2019)	Grand Cross
20 September 1999	Philippines – President Joseph Estrada (1998–2001)	Collar
15 May 2000	Paraguay – President Luis González Macchi (1999–2003)	Collar
18 May 2000	Chile – President Ricardo Lagos (2000–2006)	Collar
25 September 2000	Saudi Arabia – Prince Abdullah bin Abdul-Aziz al Saud (1982–2005)	Grand Cross
12 October 2000	Colombia – President Andrés Pastrana Arango (1998–2002)	Collar
14 March 2001	Italy – President Carlo Azeglio Ciampi (1999–2006)	Collar
21 August 2001	Dominican Republic – President Hipólito Mejía (2000–2004)	Collar
15 November 2001	Portugal – President Jorge Sampaio (1996–2006)	Collar
7 April 2003	(Sovereign Military Order of Malta) Sovereign Order of Malta – Prince and Grand Master Fra' Andrew Bertie (1988–2008)	Grand Cross
29 April 2003	Uruguay – President Jorge Batlle (2000–2005)	Collar
7 December 2004	Morocco – King Mohammed VI (1999–incumbent)	Collar
21 April 2008	Ecuador – President Rafael Correa (2007–2017)	Collar
24 November 2008	Mexico – President Felipe Calderón (2006–2012)	Collar
9 February 2009	Spain – Princess Letizia (2004–2014)	Grand Cross
16 January 2011	Kuwait – Emir Sabah Al-Ahmad Al-Jaber Al-Sabah (2006–2020)	Collar
16 January 2011	Kuwait – Prince Nawaf Al-Ahmad Al-Jaber Al-Sabah (2006–2020)	Grand Cross
28 November 2012	Peru – President Ollanta Humala (2011–2016)	Collar
8 May 2013	Venezuela – President Nicolás Maduro (2013–Incumbent) / Revoked by President Mauricio Macri.	Collar
2016	Japan – Prime Minister Shinzo Abe (2006–2007, 2012–2020)	Grand Cross
25 February 2016	France – President François Hollande (2012–2017)	Collar
29 July 2016	Mexico – President Enrique Peña Nieto (2012–2018)	Collar
8 August 2016	United Nations – Secretary-General Ban Ki-moon (2007–2016)	Grand Cross
9 August 2016	Australia – Governor-General Peter Cosgrove (2014–2019)	Collar
22 February 2017	Spain – King Felipe VI (2014–Incumbent)	Collar
27 March 2017	Netherlands – King Willem-Alexander (2013–incumbent)	Collar
13 November 2017	United States – Former president Jimmy Carter (1977–1981)	Grand Cross
8 May 2017	Italy – President Sergio Mattarella (2015–Incumbent)	Collar
6 March 2018	Norway – King Harald V (1991–incumbent)	Collar
2 December 2018	China – President Xi Jinping (2013–Incumbent)	Collar
25 January 2021	Uruguay – Former president José Mujica (2010–2015)	Collar
