= Order of Boyacá =

Highest peacetime national honor of Colombia

Order of Boyacá Orden de Boyacá
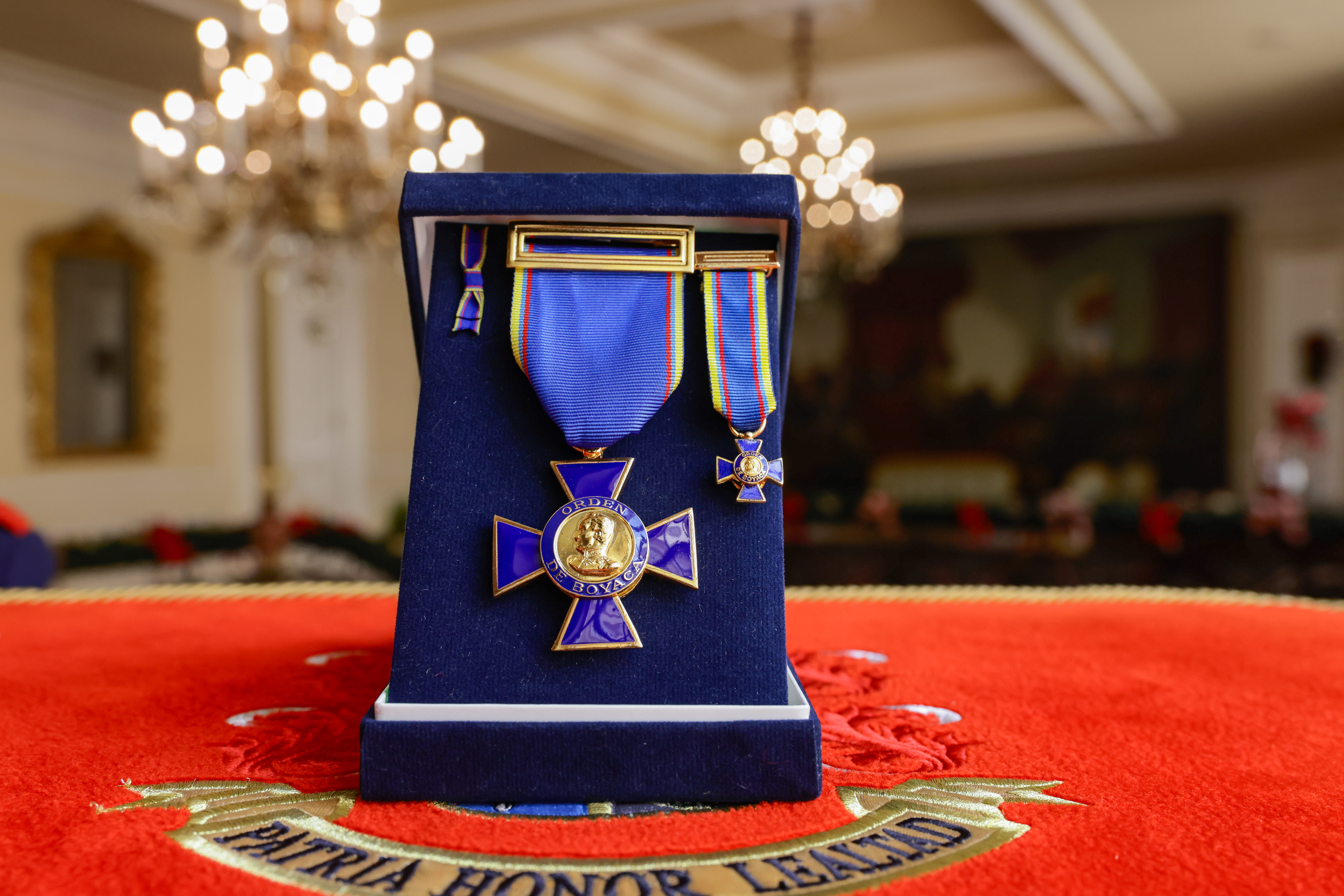
- Insignia of the Order of Boyacá

Awarded by Colombia
- Awarded for: Exceptional service to Colombia
- Status: Currently constituted
- Grand Master: President of Colombia
- Grades: Gran Collar, Gran Cruz Extraordinaria, Gran Cruz, Gran Official, Cruz de Plata, Comendador, Oficial, and Caballero

Precedence
- Next (higher): Military Order of St. Matthew
- Next (lower): Order of San Carlos
- Ribbon bar of the Order of Boyacá

The Order of Boyacá (Spanish: Orden de Boyacá) is the highest peacetime decoration of Colombia. The order is awarded for exceptional service to distinguished Colombian military officers and civilians as well as foreign citizens of friendly nations. Established in 1922, the Order of Boyacá traces its origin to a Cruz de Boyacá that was awarded to the generals who led their forces to victory in the Battle of Boyacá in 1819. Reestablished in 1919 as an award for military personnel the order has undergone revisions and expansions into its current form, with the biggest change happening in 1922 where civilians became eligible to be awarded the Order of Boyaca.

== Grades ==
The Order of Boyacá is awarded in eight different grades:

- Grand Collar (Gran Collar), awarded to heads of state and to the President of Colombia upon his election.
- Grand Cross Extraordinary (Gran Cruz Extraordinaria), awarded to former heads of state and Colombian Cardinals.
- Grand Cross (Gran Cruz), awarded to Cardinals, Ambassadors, Ministers of State, Marshals, Generals of the Armed Forces, Lieutenant Generals, Admirals, or individuals of an equal or similar rank.
- Grand Officer (Gran Oficial), awarded to Envoys Extraordinary and Ministers Plenipotentiary, Archbishops, Major Generals, Brigadier Generals, Admirals, Vice Admirals, or individuals of an equal or similar rank.
- Silver Cross (Cruz de Plata), awarded to individuals and organizations as recognition for tenure and length of service.
- Commander (Comendador), awarded to Ministers Residents, business owners and managers, Bishops, Colonels, Lieutenant colonels, Majors, Captains, Commanders, Lieutenant Commanders, or individuals of an equal or similar rank.
- Officer (Oficial), Chargé d'affaires ad interim, Counselors, First Secretaries, Consuls General, Captains, Lieutenants, or individuals of an equal or similar rank.
- Knight (Caballero), awarded to Second and Third Secretaries, Consuls and Vice-Consuls, Attachés to embassies and legations, Lieutenants and Second Lieutenants, Lieutenants (junior grade) and Ensigns, or individuals of an equal or similar rank.

Ribbon bars of the Order of Boyacá
Grand Collar	Grand Cross Extraordinary	Grand Cross	Grand Officer
Silver Cross	Commander	Officer	Knight

== Notable recipients ==
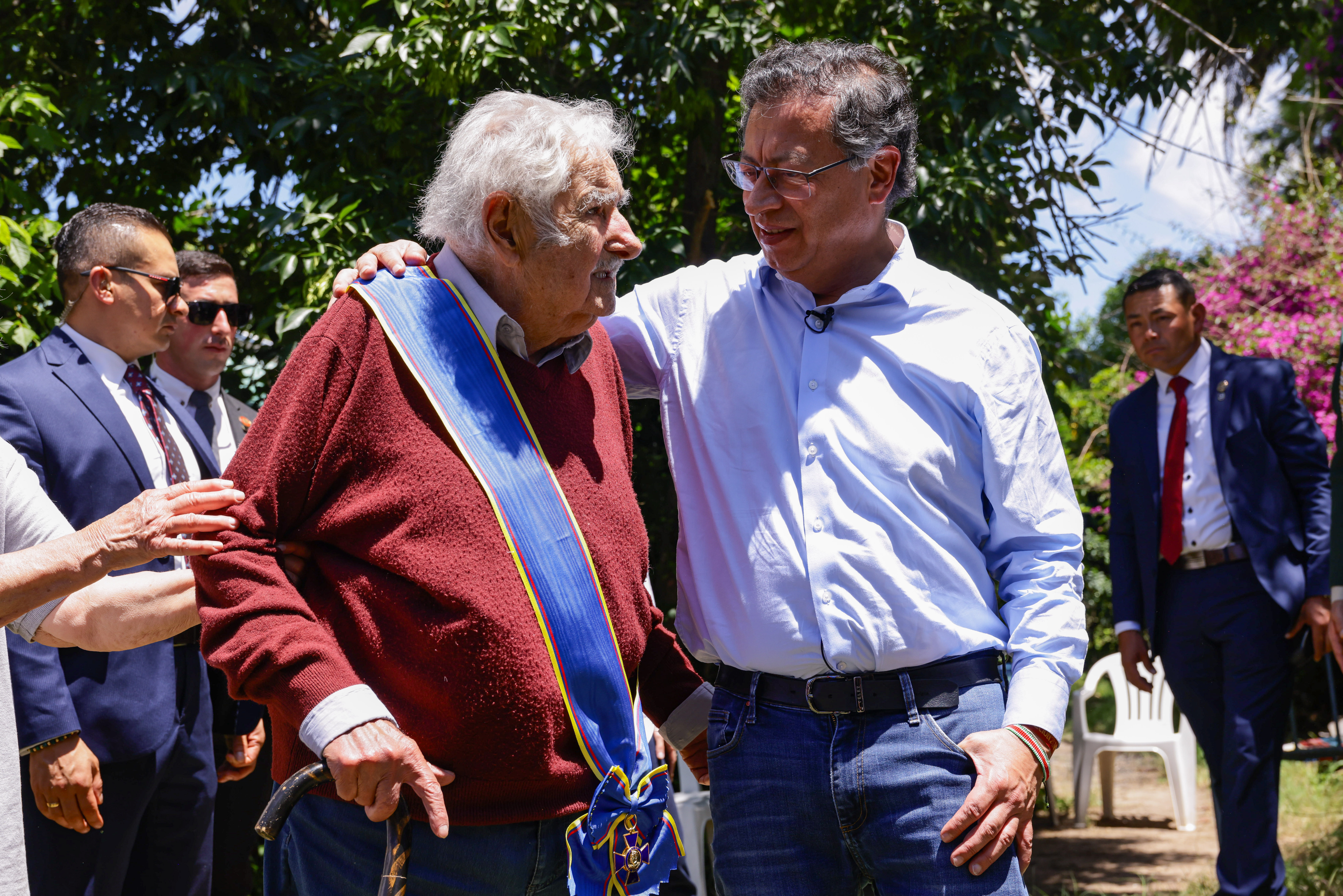
President Gustavo Petro awarding José Mujica with the Extraordinary Grand Cross of the Order of Boyacá in 2024

Country	Name	Charge	Grand Collar	Grand Cross	Grand Cross Extraordinary	Year
Uruguay	José Mujica	Former President		Yes		2024
Chile	Gabriel Boric	President	Yes			2023
Dominican Republic	Luis Abinader	President	Yes			2022
South Korea	Moon Jae-in	President	Yes			2021
United States	Joe Biden	Vice President		Yes		2016
Spain	Felipe VI	King	Yes			2015
Spain	Letizia	Queen		Yes		2015
Brazil	Dilma Rousseff	President	Yes			2015
Chile	Sebastián Piñera	President	Yes			2010
United Kingdom	Tony Blair	Former Prime Minister		Yes		2011
Brazil	Luiz Inácio Lula da Silva	President	Yes			2005
United Kingdom	Elizabeth II	Queen	Yes			1993
Morocco	Youssef Fassi Fihri	Ambassador		Yes		1992
Poland	Mieczyslaw Biernacki	Ambassador		Yes		1992
Finland	Urho Kekkonen	President	Yes			1980
Mexico	José López Portillo	President	Yes			1979
Spain	Juan Carlos I	King	Yes			1976
Spain	Sofia	Queen		Yes		1976
Republic of China	Chiang Kai-shek	President	Yes			1963
Czechoslovakia	Tomáš Masaryk	Former President	Yes			1937
Czechoslovakia	Edvard Beneš	President	Yes			1937
El Salvador	Maximiliano Hernández Martínez	President		Yes		1936
Ecuador	Alfredo Baquerizo Moreno	President			Yes	1931
Venezuela	Juan Vicente Gómez	President	Yes			1925
Spain	Alfonso XIII	King	Yes			1925
Spain	Victoria Eugenie	Queen		Yes		1925
