= Lord of Balaguer =

Title held by heir to the Kingdom of Majorca

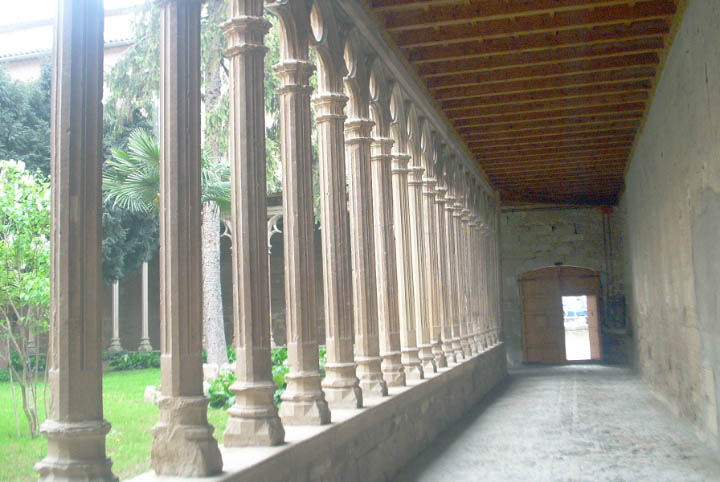
Saint James Cloister, Convent of Saint Dominic, Balaguer

Lord or Lady of Balaguer (Catalan: Senyor de Balaguer, Spanish: Señor o Señora de Balaguer) is one of the titles of the heir of the Crown of Spain. It is a title historically held by the person first in line to the Kingdom of Majorca, a part of the Crown of Aragon. The current holder is Princess Leonor, elder daughter and heir presumptive of King Felipe VI.

== Evolution ==
This Lordship was created in 1418 by King Alfonso V of Aragon, called the Magnanimous, for his brother John II, symbolically linked to the city that had been capital of the suppressed County of Urgell, the feudal command of the greater rival of the House of Trastámara for the possession of the Aragonese Crown during the Interregnum, James II, Count of Urgell.

When John II succeeded Alfonso V in 1458, the title was awarded to John's second son, Ferdinand. After Ferdinand II's accession, the lordship was held by the heir apparent to the Crown of Aragon and was always joined to the title of Prince of Girona.

== See also ==
- Balaguer
- Crown of Aragon
- Coat of arms of the Prince of Asturias
- Line of succession to the Spanish Throne
- List of titles and honours of the Heir Apparent to the Spanish Throne
