= Duke of Montblanc =

Dukedom of Spain

- Coat of arms of Montblanc
- Creation date: 16 January 1387
- Created by: John I of Aragon
- Peerage: Spanish nobility
- First holder: Martin of Aragon
- Present holder: Leonor, Princess of Asturias
- Subsidiary titles: Marquess of San Agustín
- Status: Extant

Duke or Duchess of Montblanc (Catalan: Duc de Montblanc, Spanish: Duque de Montblanc) is one of the titles of the heir of the Crown of Spain. It is a Spanish title which since the 15th century has been preserved as one of the titles of the heir apparent to, first, the Aragonese crown and, later and currently, the Spanish crown. The title is specifically that of the heir to the Principality of Catalonia, part of the Crown of Aragon.

The Duchy of Montblanc was created by John I of Aragon when he granted it to his brother Martin on January 6, 1387. When Martin became King of Aragon in 1396, the title returned to the crown.

Since then, kings have bestowed "Duke of Montblanc" as a nonhereditary title, usually upon one of their sons. During the reign of Ferdinand II of Aragon, the title was granted to the heir apparent to the kingdoms of the crown of Aragon, together with the title of Prince of Girona.

After the War of the Spanish Succession (1700–1714), the victorious Philip V of Spain disestablished all the statuses and constitutions of the Crown of Aragon, including the Duchy of Montblanc.

The present king of Spain, Felipe VI, was the first member of the Borbon dynasty in Spain to have borne this title, which he did while heir apparent to the Spanish crown. Since 19 June 2014, the title has been reserved for Felipe's daughter Leonor, Princess of Asturias, as heiress presumptive to the Spanish crown.

== See also ==
- Crown of Aragon
- Coat of arms of the Prince of Asturias
- Line of succession to the Spanish Throne
- List of titles and honours of the Heir Apparent to the Spanish Throne
- Montblanc (Catalonia)
