= Count of Cervera =

Spanish noble title since 1353

Coat of Arms of the former Counts and County of Cervera

The title Count or Countess of Cervera (Catalan: Comte de Cervera, Spanish: Conde o Condesa de Cervera) is one of the titles of the heir of the Crown of Spain. Its current holder is Leonor, Princess of Asturias, heiress to Felipe VI. Cervera is the capital of the comarca of Segarra, in the province of Lleida, Catalonia. The title specifically represents the heir to the Kingdom of Valencia, a part of the Crown of Aragon.

The title was created on 27 January 1353 by Peter IV of Aragon for his son and heir, the infante John, who was later John I of Aragon. The title, which Peter claimed as Count of Barcelona, passed in the Crown of Aragon; it has been united with the Aragonese title Prince of Girona since 1414, after which its history may be traced under that title.

The Crown of Aragon and its institutions were formally abolished after the War of the Spanish Succession (1702–1713) with the accession of the first Bourbon king of Spain, by the Nueva Planta decrees, under which all the lands of Aragon were incorporated, as provinces, into a united Spanish administration, as Spain moved towards a more centralized government under the new Bourbon dynasty.

By royal decree from 21 January 1977, the hereditary titles of the former Crown of Aragon were invested in Don Felipe de Borbón (now King Felipe VI), naming him "Prince of Asturias and other titles historically related to the Heir to the Crown of Spain". In the question of succession the Spanish Constitution of 1978 (Title II, art. 57.2) indicates: "The Heir to the Throne, from his birth or the fact that causes his call, has the rank of Prince of Asturias and other titles traditionally linked to the Heirs to the Crown of Spain".

== See also ==
- Cervera
- Crown of Aragon
- Coat of arms of the Prince of Asturias
- Line of succession to the Spanish Throne
- List of titles and honours of the Heir Apparent to the Spanish Throne
