= Sofía of Spain =

Sofía of Spain may refer to:

- Queen Sofía of Spain (born 1938)
- Infanta Sofía of Spain (born 2007)
