= Jewels of the Swedish royal family =

Jewels belonging to the Royal House of Sweden

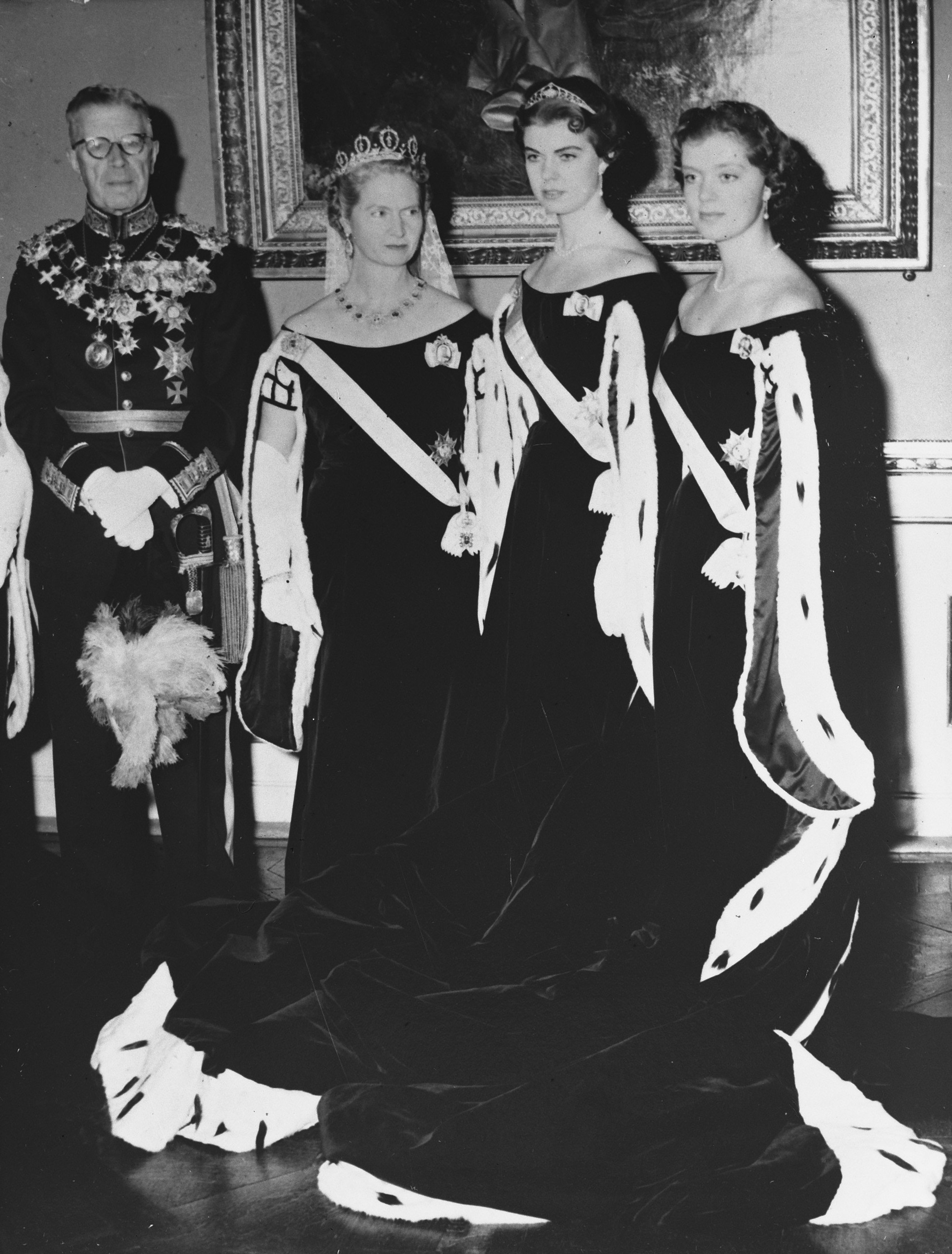
(L–R) Gustaf VI Adolf, Princess Sibylla, wearing the Connaught Diamond Tiara with the Vasa Earrings and the Bernadotte Emerald Demi-Parure, Princess Margaretha, wearing Queen Louise's Diamond Tiara, and Princess Birgitta at the opening of the Riksdag, 1956

The Swedish royal family owns a historic collection of jewels – some owned by the Bernadotte family foundation and others by private individuals. They are separate from the state regalia of Sweden which is owned by the Swedish state.

The jewels are worn on occasions such as state banquets, the Nobel Banquet, the annual Representationsmiddag (Representation dinner) and royal weddings. They are maintained by the court jeweller, W. A. Bolin.

== History ==
Much of the Swedish royal family's jewel collection originates from when Princess Joséphine of Leuchtenberg--granddaughter of Napoléon Bonaparte's first wife, Joséphine de Beauharnais-- married the future Oscar I in 1823. Joséphine, known in Sweden as Josefina, also received a large inheritance of jewels from her sister, Empress Amélia of Brazil. Princess Viktoria of Baden brought a large jewel collection with her when she married the future Gustaf V in 1881, as did Princess Margaret of Connaught when she married the future Gustaf VI Adolf in 1905.

Karl XIV Johan established a fideicommissum of jewels that would be at the queen's disposal, so that the collection would increase but could never decrease. At the end of the 19th century, Oscar II transformed the fideicommissum into a foundation, now part of the Bernadotte family foundation. These pieces do not belong to the royal family privately, but they can borrow them from the foundation to wear.

== Diadems ==
The Braganza Tiara

The Braganza Tiara is a 3kg diamond diadem, commissioned by Pedro I of Brazil for his second wife, Amélie of Leuchtenberg. When Amélie died, the tiara was passed to her sister, Josephine of Leuchtenberg. The tiara has been part of the Swedish royal collection ever since. It has notably been worn by Louise Mountbatten at the Coronation of George VI and Elizabeth.

== See also ==
- Jewels of Elizabeth II
- Jewels of Diana, Princess of Wales
- Jewels of the Spanish royal family

== Print sources ==
- Bond, Cay; Alm Göran (2006). (in Swedish) Drottning Silvias festklänningar och de kungliga smyckena. Stockholm: Atlantis. Libris 10154529. ISBN 91-7353-130-8 (inb.)
- Alm, Göran; Fogelmarck Stig, Granslund Lis (1976). (in Swedish) Smycken för drottningar tillhöriga de Bernadotteska stiftelserna: Stockholms slott 1976-1977. Stockholm: Ståthållarämbetet. Libris 3277116
- Steen Jensen, Bjarne (2002) (in Danish). Juvelerne i det danske kongehus. Köpenhamn: Nyt Nordisk forlag Arnold Busck. ISBN 87-17-07143-7 (inb.)

=== Documentaries ===
- Kungliga smycken - Symboler för makt och kärlek (In Swedish) Aired 2020 on SVT (2 parts)
- De Kongelige Juveler (In Danish and English) Aired 2011 on DR (2 parts)
