= Regalia of Spain =

Crown of Spain

Corona tumular
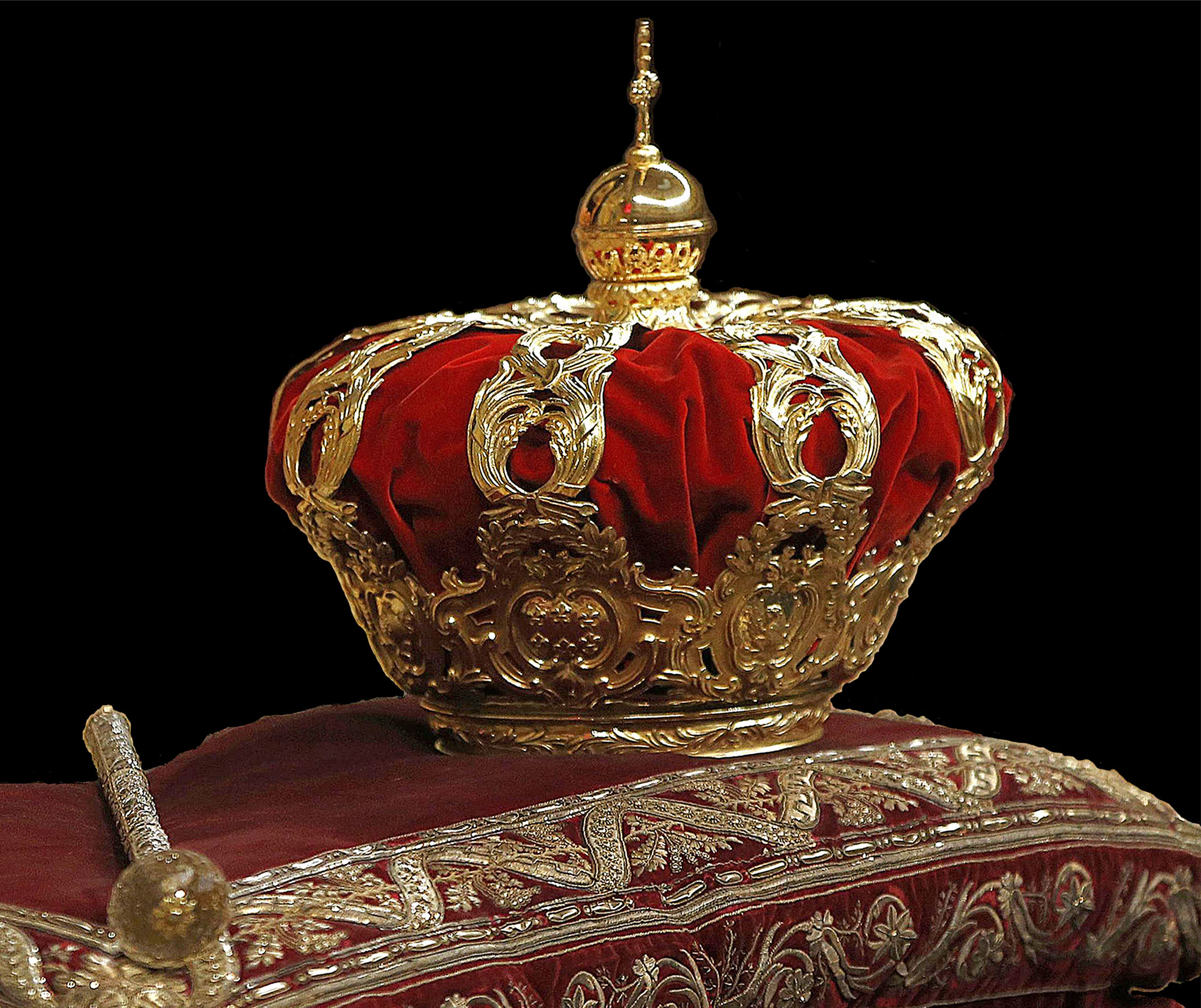
- The corona tumular and sceptre

Heraldic depictions

Details
- Country: Spain
- Made: 1775
- Owner: Spanish State
- Weight: 1 kg
- Arches: 8
- Material: Silver-gilt
- Cap: Red velvet
- Notable stones: None

The Spanish Royal Crown may refer to either the heraldic crown, which does not exist physically, or the crown known as the corona tumular, a physical crown used during Spanish royal proclamation ceremonies since the 18th century. It is never worn by the monarch.

The last time the corona tumular was used at a public ceremony was in the Cortes Generales during the swearing-in of King Felipe VI on 19 June 2014 after the abdication of his father, King Juan Carlos I. Since July 2014, the royal crown and sceptre are on permanent public display for the first time ever in the so-called Crown Room at the Royal Palace of Madrid.

== History ==
The heraldic royal crown of Spain

The heraldic crown of the Queen Consort of Spain

The last Spanish monarchs being solemnly crowned were Juan I of Castile (1379), Fernando I of Aragon (1414), and Leonor of Navarre (1479). Joan III of Navarre was crowned as late as 1555, although she ruled Navarre beyond the Pyrenees.

After the 17th century, all Spanish monarchs have taken the royal rank by proclamation and acclamation before the Church, and since the 18th century, before the Cortes Generales, although the royal crown has been present in these ceremonies.

The current king, Felipe VI, was proclaimed King of Spain on 19 June 2014, having the following symbols displayed in front of him:

- The commemorative crown (i.e. the corona tumular) bearing the marks of 1775, possibly made for the funeral of Elisabeth Farnese, queen consort of King Felipe V. The crown, made of gold-plated silver and no gems, displays the heraldic symbols of the founding kingdoms of Castile and León, with a turret and lion respectively. It was made by order of King Carlos III in Madrid.
- A sceptre, present of Rudolf II, Holy Roman Emperor, to King Felipe II; made in Vienna in the 16th century.

== National jewels vs. private jewels ==
The jewels exhibited solemnly in the royal proclamations and other collections traditionally linked to the Spanish Crown, such as the Treasure of the Dauphin –currently displayed at the Museo del Prado– or others kept in different places, are part of the National Heritage managed by Patrimonio Nacional.

The jewels worn by members of the Spanish royal family today, such as headbands, tiaras, necklaces, decorations, etc., are strictly private, are not linked to any institution, and are considered the personal property of the corresponding member –be it the King as a private person, or some other relative–. In that condition, they were taken with them into exile in 1931 –with the proclamation of the Second Spanish Republic– and stayed out of Spain until 1975. Of special relevance is the joyas de pasar collection, for the exclusive use of the Queen on solemn occasions.

== Gallery ==
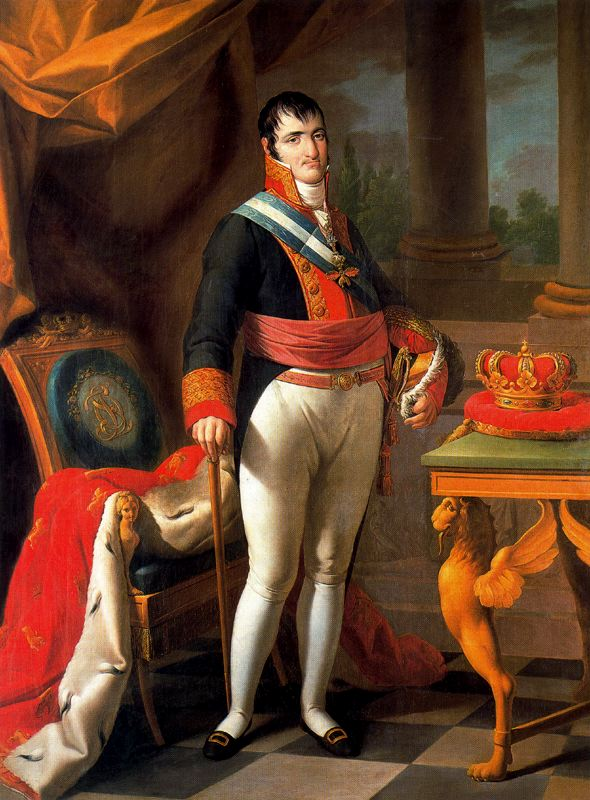
The heraldic crown depicted on a portrait of King Fernando VII

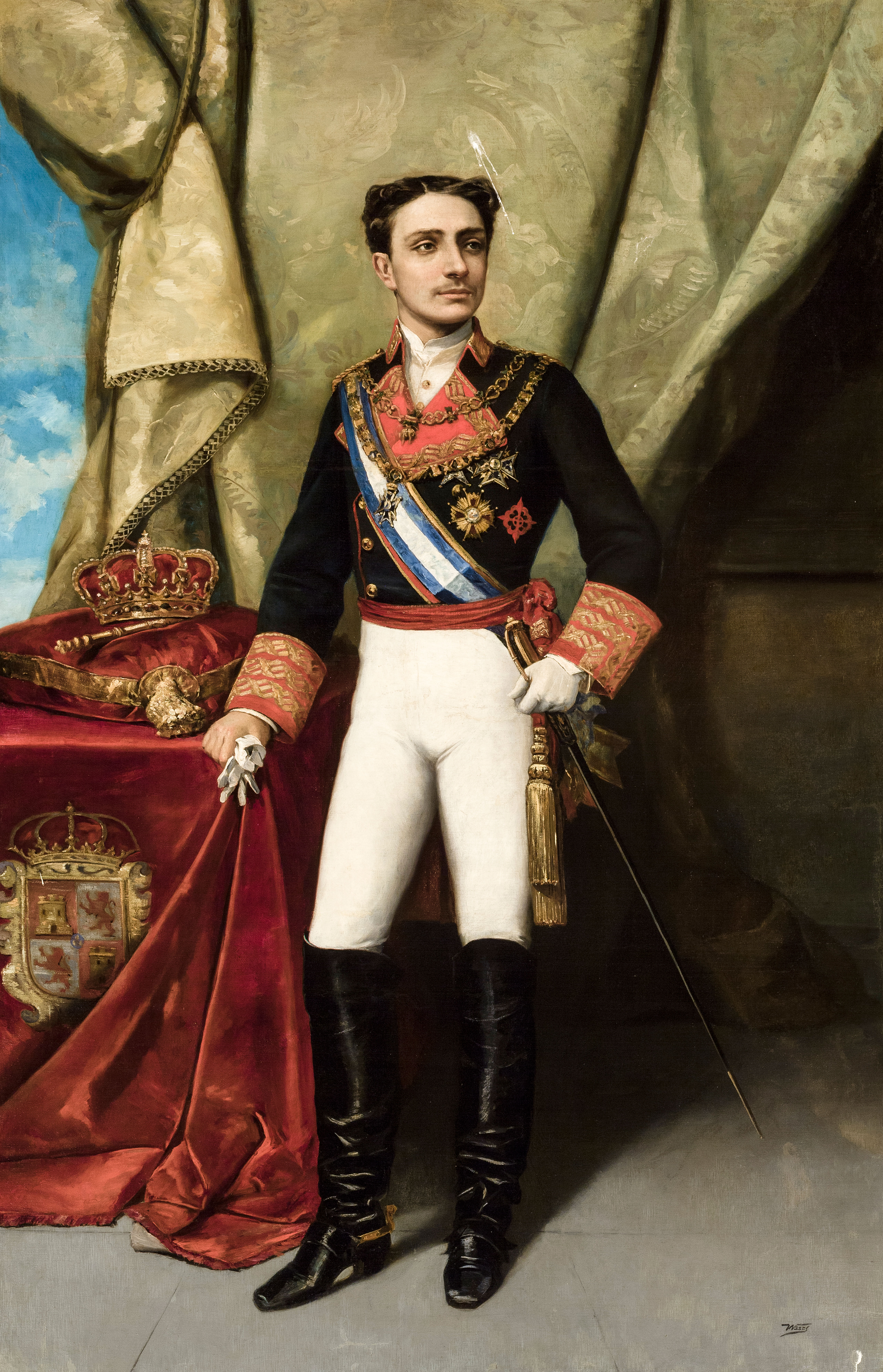
The heraldic crown depicted on a portrait of King Alfonso XII

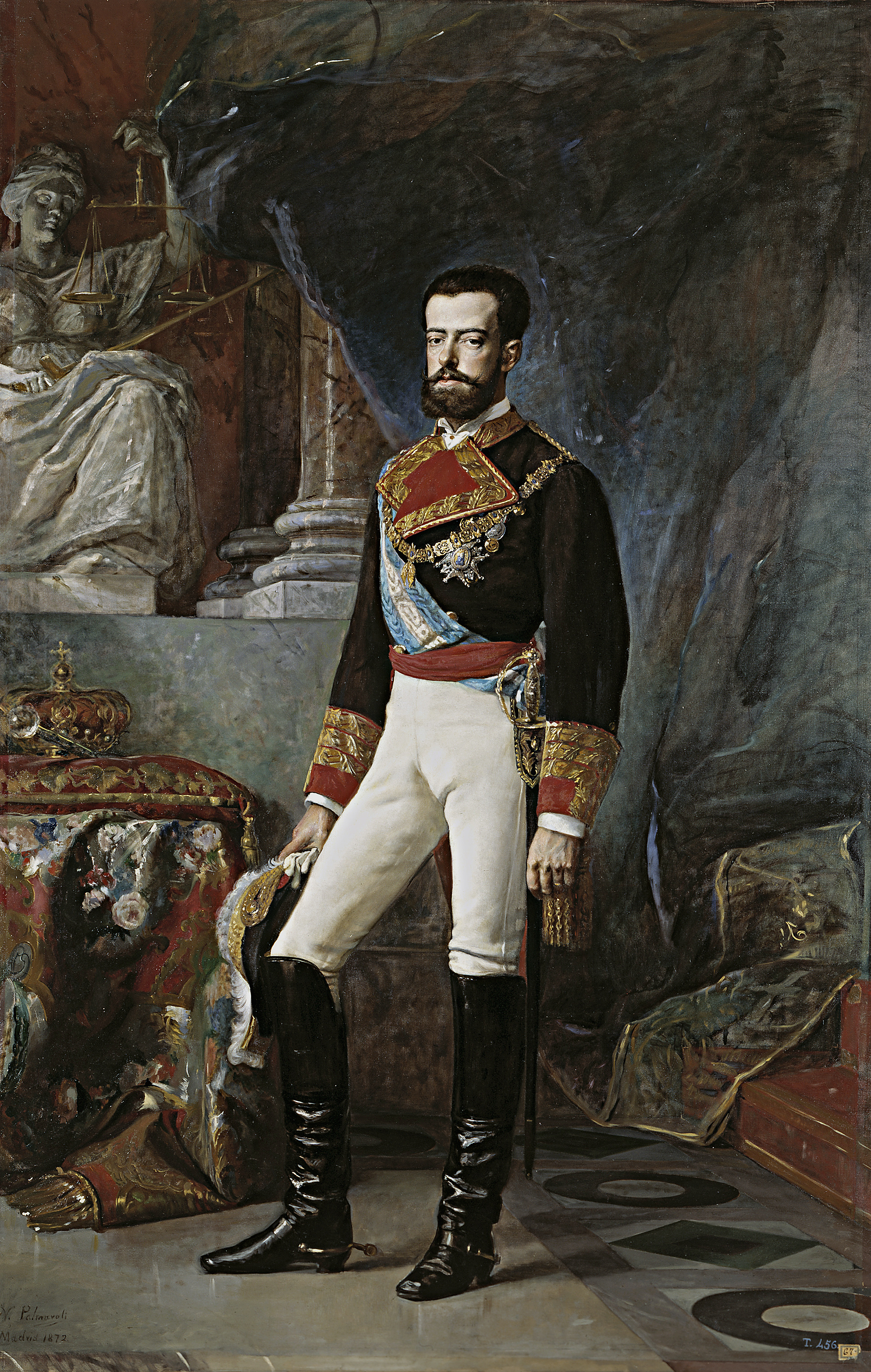
The corona tumular depicted on a portrait of King Amadeo I

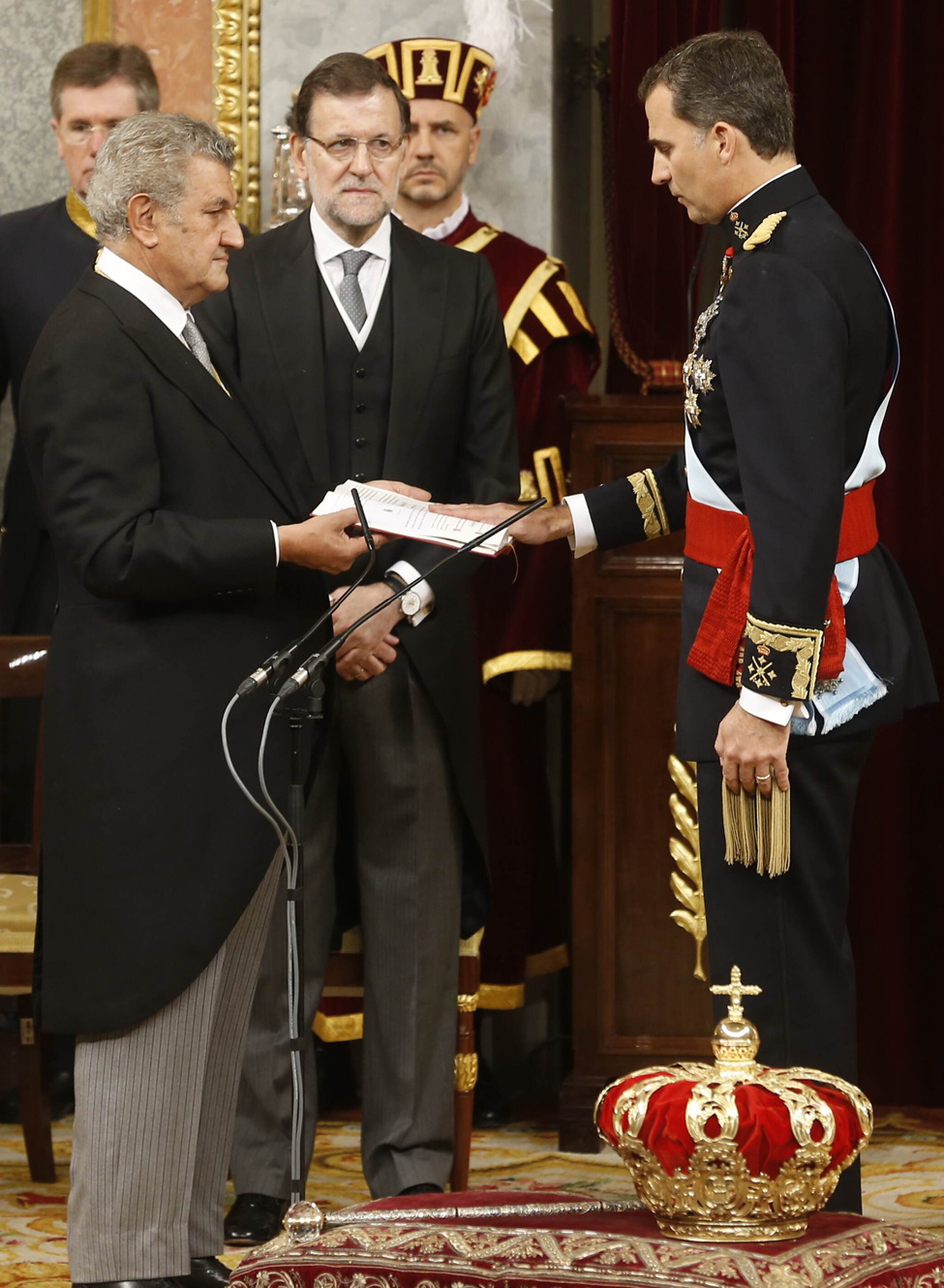
The proclamation of Felipe VI, the present king, in 2014. The crown is in the foreground
