= Queen Letizia of Spain =

Queen of Spain since 2014

Letizia
- Letizia in 2026

Queen consort of Spain
- Tenure: 19 June 2014 – present
- Born: Letizia Ortiz Rocasolano; 15 September 1972 (age 54); Oviedo, Spain
- Spouses: Alonso Guerrero Pérez (m. 1998; div. 1999) Felipe VI (m. 2004)
- Issue: Leonor, Princess of Asturias; Infanta Sofía
- House: Bourbon-Anjou (by marriage)
- Father: Jesús José Ortiz Álvarez
- Mother: María de la Paloma Rocasolano Rodríguez
- Education: Complutense University of Madrid; Institute for Studies in Audiovisual Journalism

Letizia Ortiz Rocasolano (pronounced [leˈtiθja oɾˈtiθ rokasoˈlano]; born 15 September 1972) is Queen of Spain as the wife of King Felipe VI.

Letizia was born in Oviedo, Asturias. She worked as a journalist for ABC and EFE before becoming a news anchor at CNN+ and Televisión Española. In 1998, she married writer Alonso Guerrero Pérez; they divorced the following year. In 2004, Letizia married Felipe, then Prince of Asturias as the son and heir apparent of King Juan Carlos I. The couple have two daughters, Leonor and Sofía. As Princess of Asturias, Letizia represented her father-in-law in Spain and abroad. On Juan Carlos's abdication in June 2014, Felipe became king, making Letizia queen consort.

As the consort of the ruling monarch, Letizia has no constitutional functions of her own and it is constitutionally prohibited for her to assume any, unless she assumes the role of regent. The Queen performs public commitments representing the Crown, often with her husband, but she is focused on being the patron, president or member of numerous charities and organizations, and she is the visible face of the Spanish international cooperation, often traveling around the world supervising and promoting it.

== Family ==
Letizia Ortiz Rocasolano was born on 15 September 1972 at Miñor Sanatorium in Oviedo, Asturias, the eldest daughter of Jesús José Ortiz Álvarez, a journalist, and his first wife, María de la Paloma Rocasolano Rodríguez, a chief registered nurse and hospital union representative with a bachelor's degree in art history. She has two younger sisters, Telma (born 1973) and Érika (1975–2007). Érika died by suicide via intentional drug overdose while Letizia was pregnant with her second child.

Ortiz's parents divorced in 1999 and her father remarried in Madrid on 18 March 2004 to fellow journalist Ana Togores.

Ortiz's paternal grandparents were José Luis Ortiz Velasco (1923–2005), a commercial employee at Olivetti, and María del Carmen "Menchu" Álvarez del Valle (1928–2021), a radio broadcaster in Asturias for over 40 years. Her maternal grandfather was Francisco Julio Rocasolano Camacho (1918–2015), a mechanic and cab driver in Madrid for over 20 years who was of French and Occitan origin. Her maternal grandmother, Enriqueta Rodríguez Figueredo (1919–2008), was a Filipina of Spanish descent.

Several studies have been conducted to try to determine the queen's family genealogy. British genealogists have provided evidence that through her mother's Rocasolano lineage, Ortiz descends from Astorg Roquesoulane, a 16th-century woman who died in 1564, and her coat of arms incorporates the arms of the Rocasolano family. A French genealogist found evidence that through her mother's Rocasolano lineage, Ortiz is a 9th cousin of French singer and actress Anny Flore. Other reports have suggested, and remain unproven, that on her paternal grandfather's side, she is a descendant of an untitled family descended from medieval nobility who served as constables of Castile.

== Education and career ==
Ortiz attended La Gesta School in Oviedo, before her family moved to Rivas-Vaciamadrid near Madrid, where she attended the Ramiro de Maeztu High School. She completed a bachelor's degree in journalism, at the Complutense University of Madrid, as well as a master's degree in audiovisual journalism at the Institute for Studies in Audiovisual Journalism.

During her studies, Ortiz worked for the Asturian daily newspaper La Nueva España and later for the newspaper ABC and the national news agency EFE. After completing her master's degree, she travelled to Guadalajara, Mexico, where she worked at the newspaper Siglo 21 and began work toward a PhD. She did not, however, complete her doctoral thesis because she returned to Spain. After returning to Spain, she worked for the Spanish version of the economic channel Bloomberg before moving to the news network CNN+.

In 2000, Ortiz moved to TVE, where she started working for the news channel 24 Horas. In 2002, she anchored the weekly news report programme Informe Semanal and later the daily morning news programme Telediario Matinal on TVE 1. In August 2003, a few months before her engagement to Felipe, Prince of Asturias, Ortiz was promoted to anchor of the TVE daily evening news programme Telediario 2, the most viewed newscast in Spain.

In 2000, she reported from Washington, D.C., on the presidential elections. In September 2001, she broadcast live from Ground Zero following the 9/11 attacks in New York and in 2003, she filed reports from Iraq following the war. In 2002 she sent several reports from Galicia in northern Spain following the ecological disaster when the oil tanker Prestige sank.

== Marriages and children ==
=== First marriage ===
In the late 1980s, Letizia met Alonso Guerrero Pérez (b. 1962), a school teacher – 10 years older than her – who taught Spanish language and literature at the Ramiro de Maeztu Institute of Madrid, where she studied. After a 10-year courtship, on 7 August 1998 the couple married in a civil ceremony at the City Council of Almendralejo (Badajoz), municipality of origin of Guerrero. Letizia was 26 years old and Alonso 36. Ninety guests attended the ceremony. The marriage ended by divorce in 1999. After the divorce, Letizia moved to a small apartment located in the Madrid district of Vicálvaro. She later gave the apartment to her sister Erika; she lived there until her death in 2007.

=== Second marriage and children ===
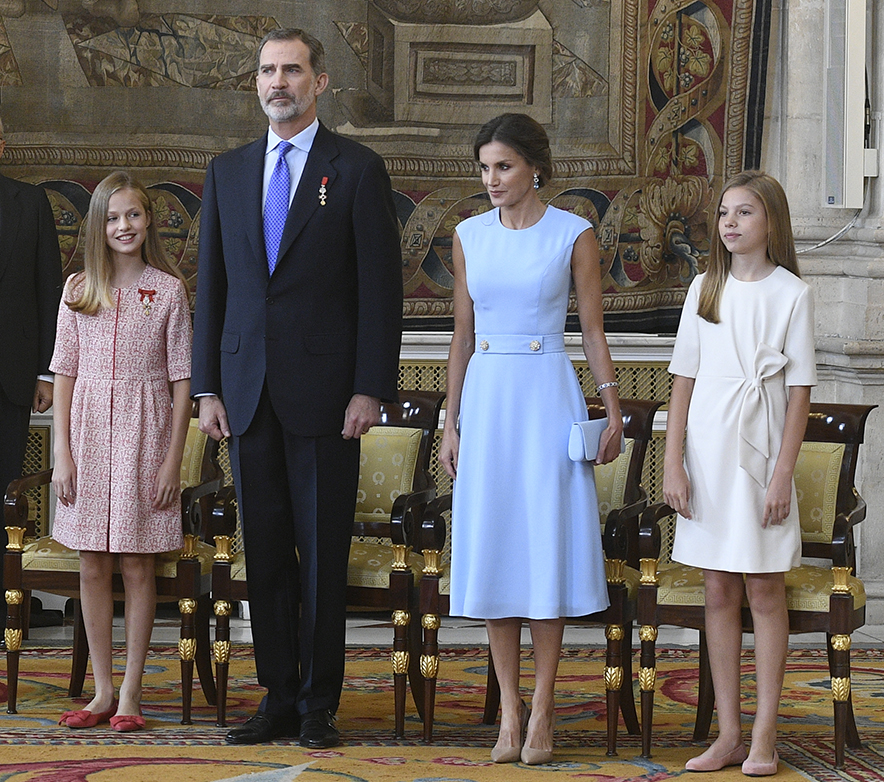
King Felipe VI, Queen Letizia and their two daughters, the Princess of Asturias and Infanta Sofia, in June 2019

On 1 November 2003, to the surprise of many, the Royal Household announced Ortiz's engagement to Prince Felipe. Following the announcement, she moved to live in a wing of the Zarzuela Palace until the day of her wedding. The Prince of Asturias had proposed to her with a 16-baguette diamond engagement ring with a white gold trim. She marked the occasion by giving him white gold and sapphire cufflinks, and a classic book.

The wedding took place on 22 May 2004 in the Almudena Cathedral in Madrid. It was the first royal wedding in this cathedral. It had been nearly a century since the capital celebrated a royal wedding, as the prince's parents married in Athens and his sisters, Infanta Elena and Infanta Cristina, married in Seville and Barcelona, respectively. Letizia's bridal gown was designed by Spanish fashion designer Manuel Pertegaz, her bridal shoes by Pura Lopez; and the veil, a gift from Felipe to his bride, was made of off-white silk tulle and hand-embroidered with detailing. As Letizia's previous marriage involved only a civil ceremony, the Catholic Church does not consider it canonically valid and therefore did not require an annulment to proceed with a Catholic marriage to Felipe.

Letizia and Felipe have two daughters: Leonor, Princess of Asturias, born on 31 October 2005, and Infanta Sofía, born on 29 April 2007. They were born in the Ruber International Hospital in Madrid.

== Princess of Asturias ==
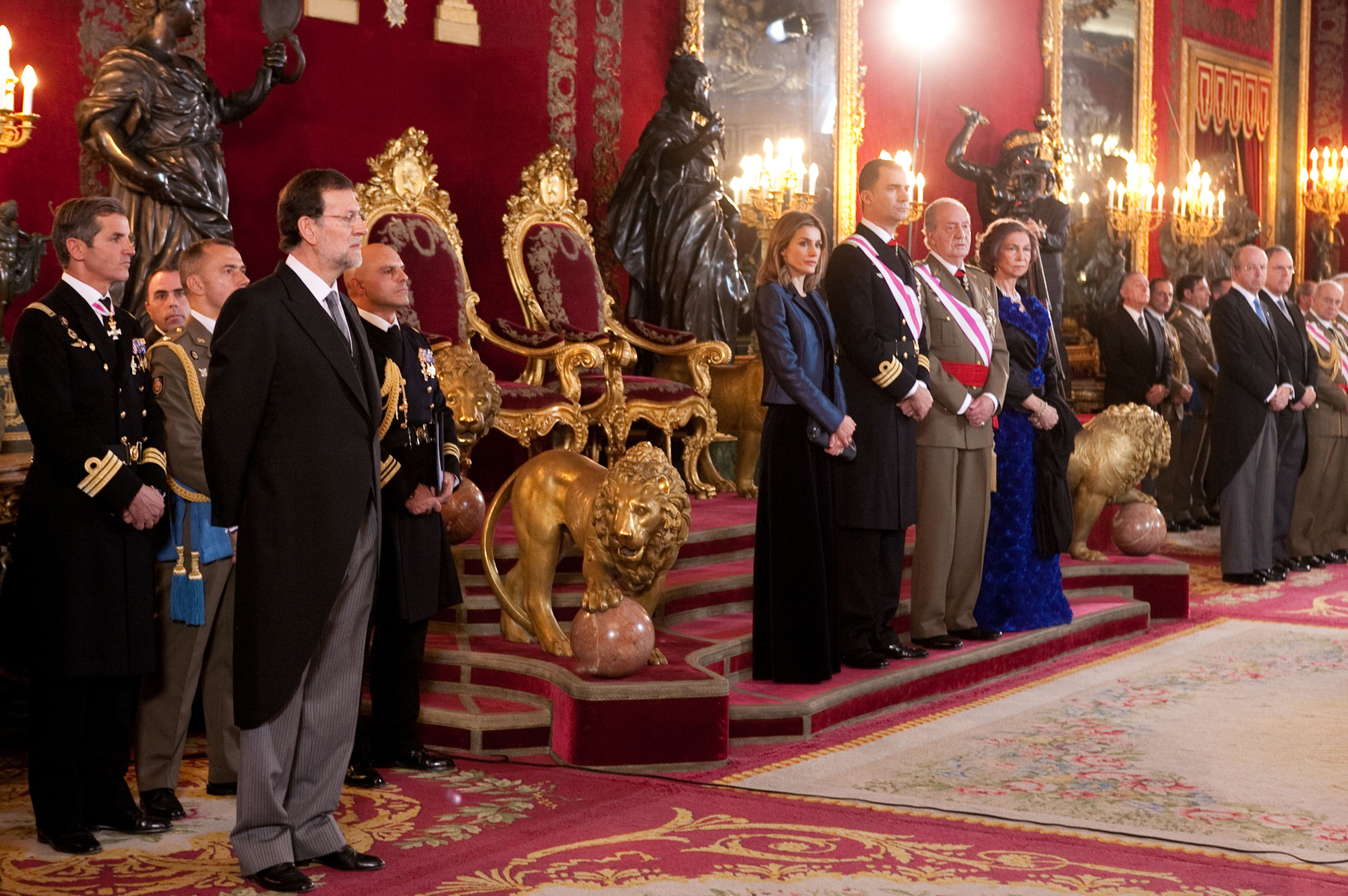
King Juan Carlos I and Queen Sofía, with the Prince and Princess of Asturias, at the 2009 Pascua Militar

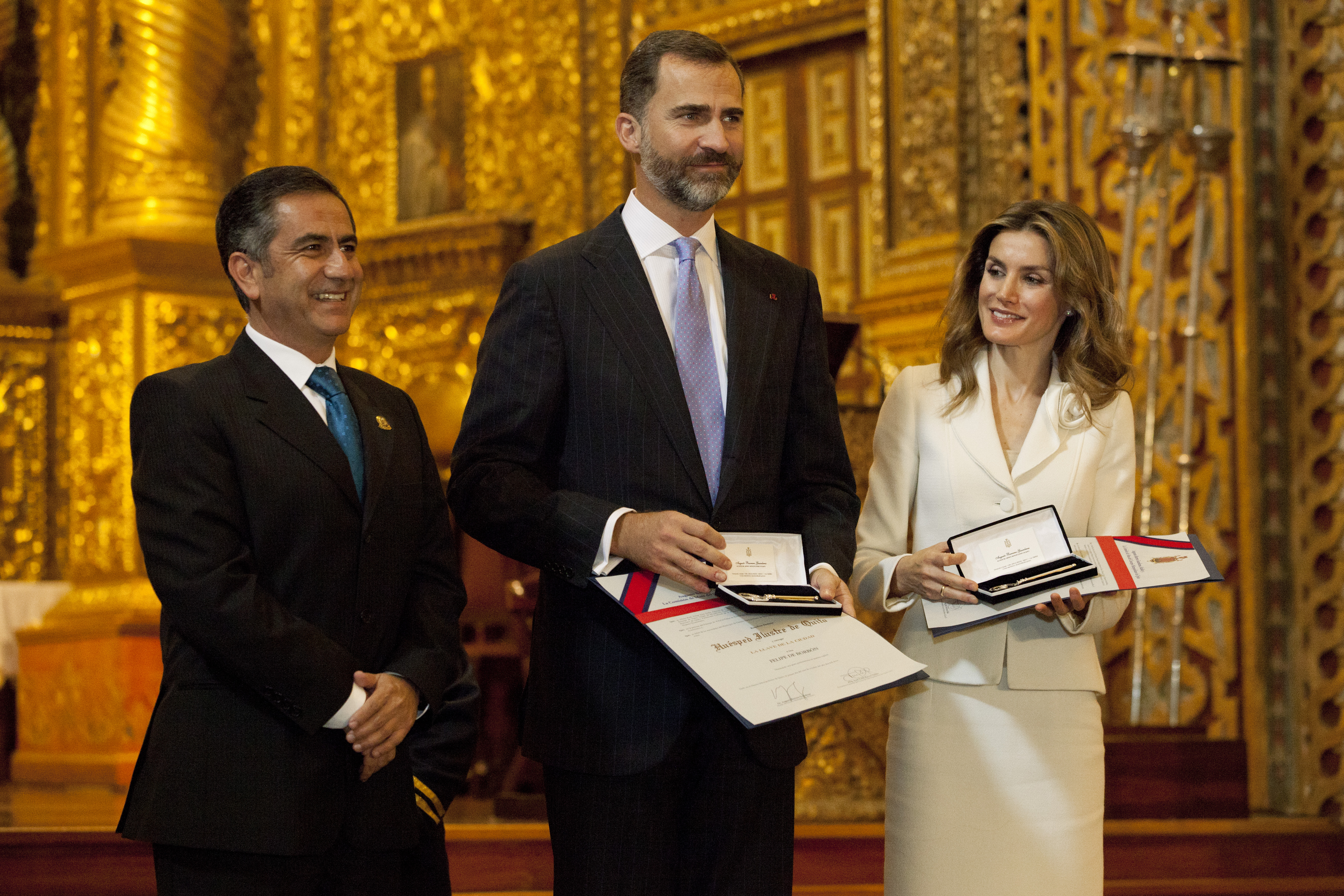
The Prince and Princess of Asturias during an official visit to Ecuador in 2012

After becoming Princess of Asturias, Letizia automatically joined the royal family and moved her residence to the Prince's Pavilion (Spanish: Pabellón del Principe), Felipe's private residence, near to the Zarzuela Palace (the private and work residence of the royal family).

Although Letizia attended some specific events of the royal family before the wedding (such as the state funeral for the 2004 Madrid train bombings victims or the wedding of Frederik, Crown Prince of Denmark, and Mary Donaldson), she immediately joined in the duties of her husband representing her father-in-law. Five days after her wedding, Letizia traveled with Queen Sofia, Prince Felipe and Infanta Cristina to the wedding of Jordan's Crown Prince Hamzah bin Hussein and Princess Noor bint Asem, which took place at the Zahran Palace. That same year, Letizia accompanied her husband on several national activities but also in international trips such us the official visits to México in July, Hungary in September, the United States in October, and Serbia in December, as well as receiving the president of the Czech Republic, Václav Klaus, and his wife, Livia Klausová, in Madrid.

In 2005, Letizia accompanied her husband to Brazil and Uruguay, both in February. They also travelled to Stockholm (Sweden) in April, to inaugurate a new office of the Cervantes Institute, and to Japan in June, where they met the Japanese Imperial Family and to visit the Expo 2005. Following the birth of Infanta Leonor at the end of 2005, the princess's agenda was reduced, although during the following year, in addition to her national commitments, she accompanied her husband on official trips to Portugal and China. The second pregnancy, this time of Infanta Sofía, also prevented her from attending some activities but, in October 2006, the Royal Household announced that the Princess of Asturias would have her own official agenda, which would be compatible with that of her husband. Her first solo act as princess was the inauguration of a public school in Pozuelo de Alarcón (Madrid) on 9 October 2006. Since then, Letizia performed regular audiences and visits focused on social issues such as children's rights, rare diseases, culture, and education. In this sense, in September 2010, the Spanish Association Against Cancer (AECC) appointed her as honorary president of the Association and its scientific foundation.

For all this, in late 2007 her solo agenda started to grow in the number of events she performed by herself and Felipe's and Letizia's agendas became more distinct and separate, and José Manuel de Zuleta, 14th Duke of Abrantes, joined the Prince of Asturias's Secretariat as private secretary to the Princess.

According to the compilation presented by the Royal Household on the occasion of the 10th anniversary of the marriage of the Prince and Princess of Asturias, between 22 May 2004 and 22 May 2014 they attended together more than 1,516 official engagements, while Princess Letizia attended another 190 alone. They also made 73 trips abroad together to 38 countries, while the Princess traveled abroad alone on two occasions, once to Geneva (Switzerland) to visit the headquarters of the World Health Organization (WHO) and another to Berlin (Germany) for the presentation of the 3rd Eva Luise Köhler Research Award about rare diseases. Together with her husband, the Princess held 248 public audiences, in which they have seen more than 7,200 people, while the Princess alone held 107 audiences for 2,100 people.

== Queen of Spain ==
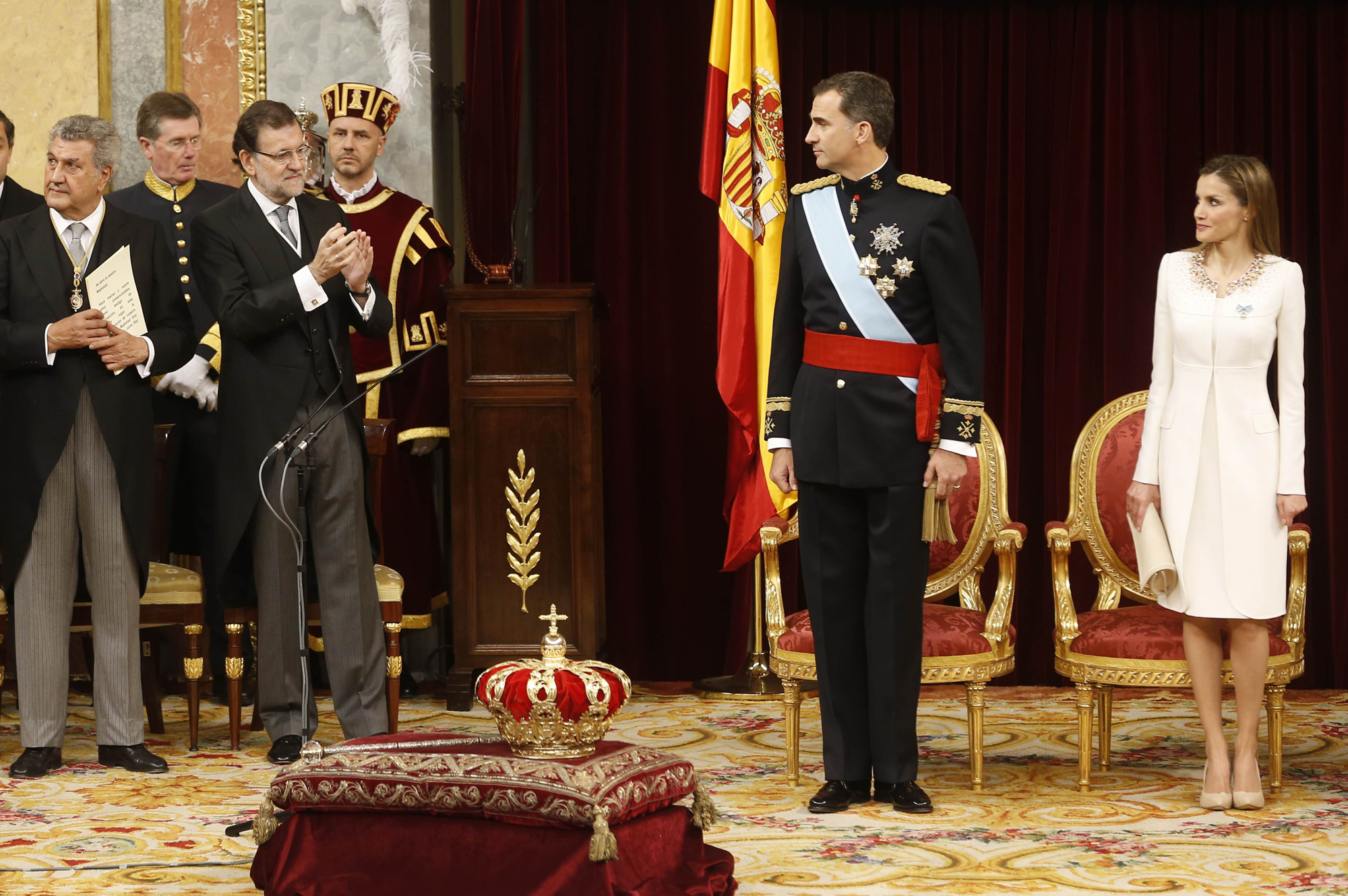
Felipe and Letizia during the proclamation of the new sovereign before the Spanish parliament

On 19 June 2014, Letizia became Queen of Spain with her husband's accession as Felipe VI; as such, she holds the style of Majesty. She is the first Spanish-born queen consort since Mercedes of Orléans, the first wife of Alfonso XII, in 1878. She is also the first Spanish queen to have been born as a commoner. The queen consort was present when King Juan Carlos I gave his son, King Felipe VI, the sash of captain general of the Armed Forces (symbolizing the transfer of royal and military power), as well as when Felipe swore before the Cortes Generales to fulfill his duties, protect and defend the Constitution as well as respecting the rights of the citizens and the Spanish regions.

Queen Letizia undertook her first solo engagement as queen on 23 June 2014 at the inauguration of the El Greco and modern painting exhibition at the Prado Museum in Madrid. On 25 June 2014, the King ratified the Duke of Abrantes as her private secretary. In their first overseas trip as king and queen, Felipe and Letizia met Pope Francis on 30 June 2014, in the Apostolic Palace. They later met with Cardinal Secretary of State Pietro Parolin, accompanied by Mgsr. Antoine Camilleri, under-secretary for Relations with States. The visit followed one by King Juan Carlos I and Queen Sofia on 28 April.

In September 2014, Letizia chaired the Royal Board on Disability, a government agency protected by the Crown whose president is the consort of the reigning monarch. On 25 October 2014, she attended the delivery ceremony of the Prince of Asturias Awards, the last with this name. From 2015 onwards, they were renamed "Princess of Asturias Awards" with Leonor, Princess of Asturias as their president. On 27 October 2014, she travelled to Vienna, Austria to inaugurate an exhibition about Spanish painter Diego Velázquez, which marked her first international solo visit. There, she met the Austrian president Heinz Fischer and his wife, Margit Fischer. It was not her last solo foreign visit that year, visiting Portugal in November for the Closing Ceremony of the 2nd Ibero-American Meeting on Rare Diseases and Italy to attend the Second International Conference on Nutrition, organized by the United Nations Food and Agriculture Organization (FAO), where she delivered the main speech. In her speech, she praised the role of women in the fight against hunger, described as "unacceptable" that more than 850 million people in the world suffer from hunger and demanded that the food industry balance its "commercial interests" with its "responsibility" to eradicate obesity. In December 2014, she chaired the general meeting of the Spanish Association Against Cancer, an association that she has chaired since 2010 and which she continues to do as queen.

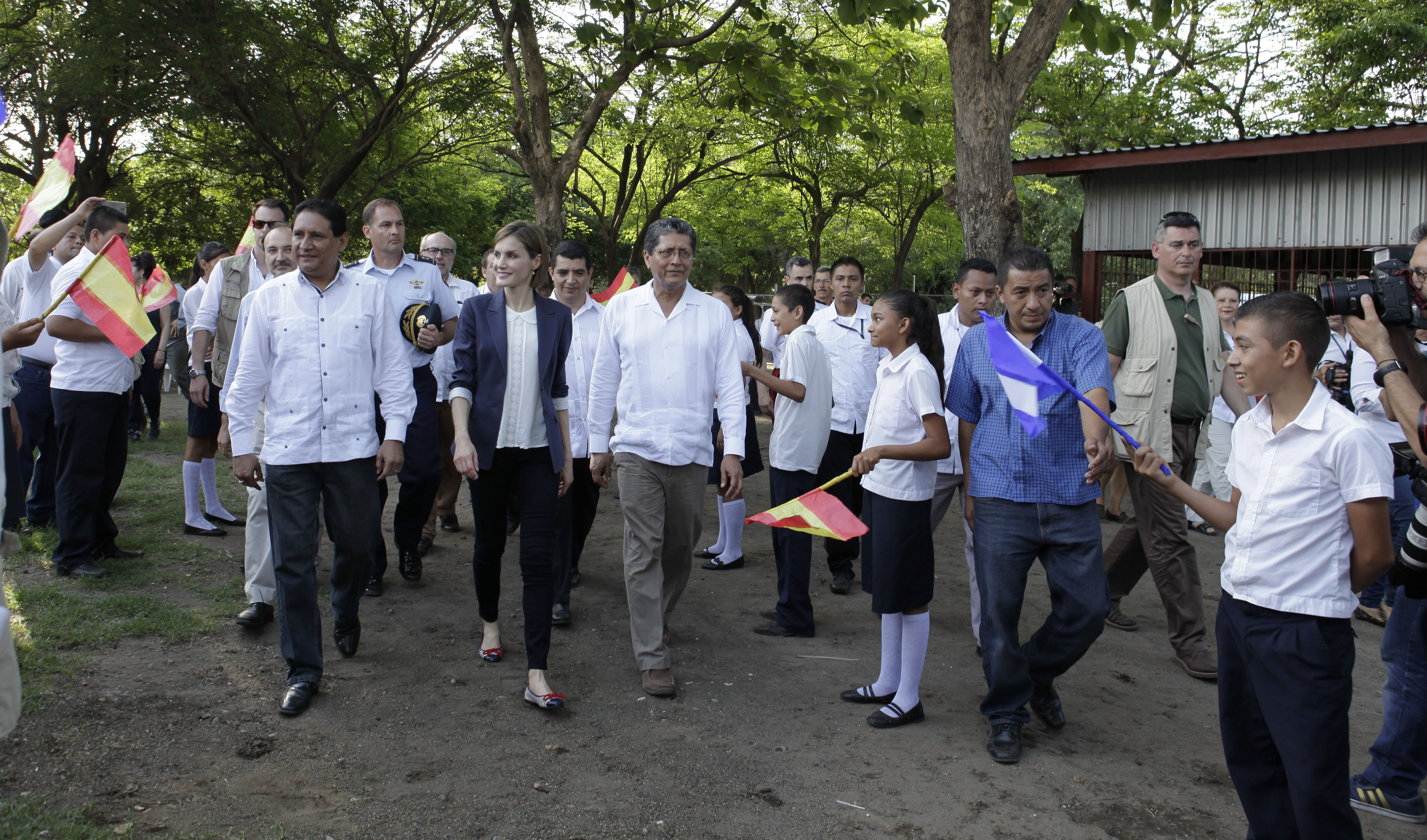
Queen Letizia during her cooperation visit to Jiquilisco, El Salvador

During 2015, Letizia continued giving support to social causes related to relevant diseases, attending events and meetings of the Spanish Association Against Cancer, the Spanish Federation of Rare Diseases and the Spanish Red Cross, among others. The King and Queen had planned their first state visit for March 2015 to France. However, on 24 March 2015 they had to postponed the visit due to the pilot of Germanwings Flight 9525 deliberately crashing the plane in the French Alps, killing 150 people, including 51 Spaniards. They resumed the state visit on early June, being welcomed by French president François Hollande. They also met the prime minister, Manuel Valls, the president of the French Senate, Gérard Larcher, the president of the National Assembly, Claude Bartolone and the mayor of Paris, Anne Hidalgo. On 13 April 2015, Queen Letizia visited the Artillery Academy, which marked her first solo military event. A few days later, she travelled with her husband to Copenhagen, Denmark, to commemorate the 75th birthday of Queen Margrethe II. From 25 to 28 of May 2015, Letizia made her first international cooperation visit to Honduras and El Salvador.

In June 2015, Letizia was named Special Ambassador for Nutrition for the United Nations Food and Agriculture Organization (FAO). Late this month, after travelling to France, she and the King made a state visit to México, their first visit to the Americas as Spain's sovereigns. They met the Mexican president, Enrique Peña Nieto, the First Lady, Angélica Rivera, the head of México City, Miguel Ángel Mancera and the leaders of the Congress of the Union. In late July 2015, she traveled alone to Milan, Italy for the Expo 2015. From 14 to 19 September 2015, the King and Queen made an official visit to the United States, where they visited American president Barack Obama and his wife, Michelle Obama, and the United States Senate Committee on Foreign Relations. They later traveled to Louisiana, where they were received by soldiers with the traditional uniform of the Spanish Louisiana and to Virginia, to visit Mount Vernon. In October 2015, she traveled alone to Düsseldorf, Germany, to inaugurate an exhibition about Spanish painter Zurbarán. That month, she also accompanied King Felipe to the Princess of Asturias Awards ceremony, the first since Leonor assumed as Princess of Asturias. At the end of 2015, the Queen attended two funerals. First, in November, she attended, with the rest of the Royal Family, the funeral of Infante Carlos, Duke of Calabria in El Escorial. Second, in December, she attended the funeral of Spanish police officers killed in the 2015 Spanish Embassy attack in Kabul.

2016 was a low-key year for the Royal Family. The electoral process started with the 2015 general election and followed by the 2016 general election made it difficult for the Crown to develop a normal agenda. Letizia began 2016 by receiving different social entities in audience, such as the Roma Secretariat Foundation, the Association of Children's Organizations of Spain, the Association for Specific Language Disorder of Madrid and the Spanish Nutrition Foundation, which informed the Queen about their goals, activity and projects.

In March 2016, leaked text messages between Letizia and businessman Javier López Madrid created controversy. Together with other executives and board members of the Caja Madrid and Bankia financial group, Madrid had been accused of corruption. In October 2014, Letizia pledged her support for him, texting "We know who you are and you know who we are. We know each other, like each other, respect each other. To hell with the rest. Kisses yoga mate (miss you!!!)". Felipe also joined in, texting "We do indeed!" The newspaper El Diario later published these texts. A palace official subsequently stated that the King and Queen were no longer friends with López Madrid due to his legal issues. Also in March, Letizia made the first of the two international trips she had in 2016. She accompanied King Felipe to Puerto Rico, in order to chair the 7th International Congress of the Spanish Language. On 22 April 2016, the King and Queen gave audience to Spanish figure skater Javier Fernández after winning the 2016 World Championship (his second consecutive title). To finish the year, in late November 2016, the King and Queen made a state visit to Portugal, where they met Portuguese president Marcelo Rebelo de Sousa and prime minister António Costa, among others. While the King was fulfilling his constitutional obligations before the Portuguese authorities, the Queen met with the president of the Portuguese League Against Cancer, Víctor Veloso.

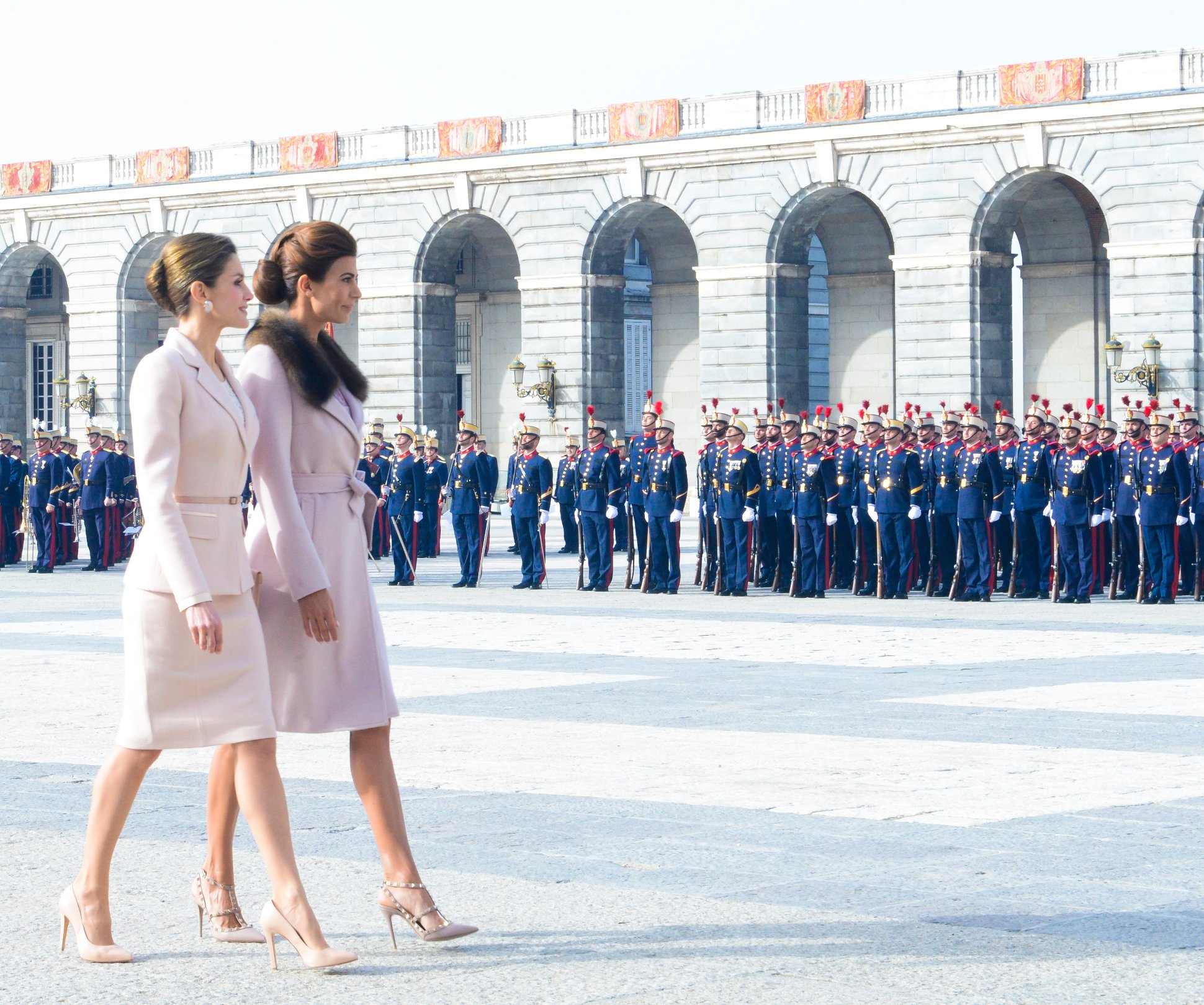
Letizia alongside Juliana Awada, First Lady of Argentina, in 2017

2017 started very like the past year, with Letizia meeting some relevant social organizations that she chaired. In February, both the King and Queen welcomed important foreign leaders at the Royal Palace of Zarzuela, such as the German president Joachim Gauck and his wife, Gerhild Radtke, and the Hungarian president János Áder and his wife, Anita Herczegh. Precisely, in an event with these last guests, the royals learned the initial judicial ruling that declared Iñaki Urdangarin, the King's brother-in-law, guilty of several corruption crimes. The King's sister, Infanta Cristina, was cleared of all crimes. To finish the month, Felipe and Letizia welcomed the Argentine president, Mauricio Macri, and the First Lady, Juliana Awada, during their state visit to Spain.

On 23 March 2017, she made her first solo trip of the year to Porto, Portugal, to attend the 7th Conference on Tobacco or Health. There, she met the Portuguese president, the European Commissioner for Health and Safety, Vytenis Andriukaitis, the minister of Health of Portugal, Adalberto Campos Fernandes, and the mayor of Porto, Rui Moreira. In April 2017, Queen Letizia and King Felipe made a state visit to Japan. At the end of the year, they travelled to the Netherlands to celebrate the 50th birthday of Willem-Alexander. In May, they offered a lunch to Jordanian Princess Muna Al Hussein and to the Portuguese president. They also celebrated, along with King Juan Carlos and Queen Sofía, the 40th anniversary of the Reina Sofía Foundation and the 10th anniversary of the Alzheimer Centre of the Foundation. In mid-July 2017, the Spanish royals made a state visit to the United Kingdom, where they met with Queen Elizabeth II and Prince Philip, Duke of Edinburgh. They also reunited with the Prince of Wales and the Duchess of Cornwall, Charles and Camilla.

On 31 October 2018, the Queen witnessed the first public address of her eldest daughter, Princess Leonor, who read the first article of the Spanish Constitution during the celebration of the 40th anniversary of the Magna Carta. A year later, on 18 October 2019, Letizia accompanied her daughter Leonor to the delivery of the Princess of Asturias Awards, the first time for the young princess. The heir to the throne delivered her first speech in public in this event.

In the context of the COVID-19 pandemic, King Felipe had to isolate himself in quarantine for testing positive for coronavirus in several occasions between 2020 and 2022. While he was isolated, the Queen replaced him in those events for which she was constitutionally authorized (awards delivery, lunches, inauguration of events, etc.) but not in those activities tightly related to constitutional responsibilities (such as the working meeting with the president of Bosnia and Herzegovina, Željko Komšić, in 2022, which had to be postponed. For the 2020 Rey Jaime I Awards in Valencia, Queen Letizia presented the award-winners with their gold medals and gave a short speech praising the "talent, effort and generosity" of prize-winners. In 2022, it was reported that Letizia was suffering from Morton's neuroma. She is also reported to have been suffering from metatarsalgia.

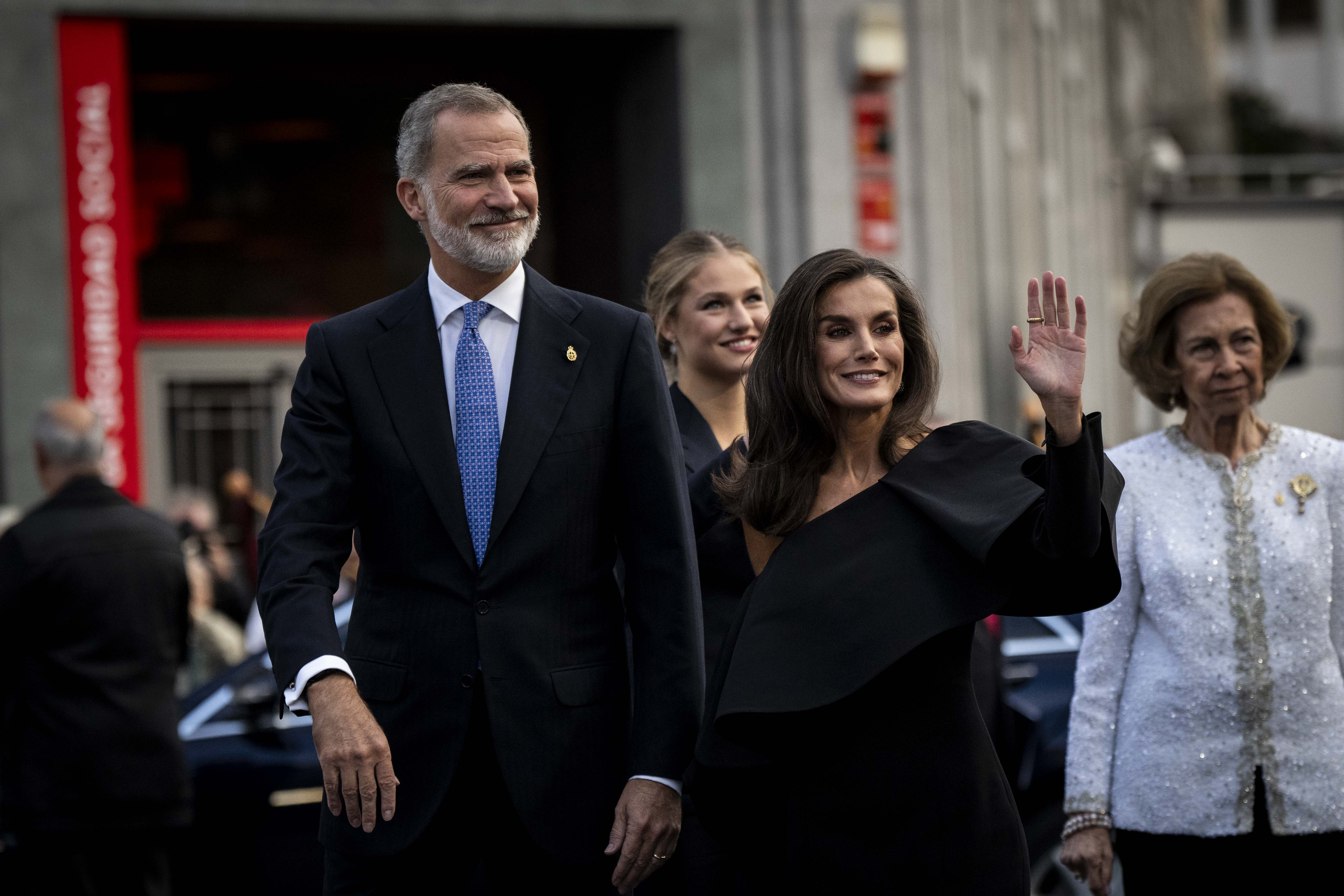
The King and Queen, together with the Princess of Asturias and Queen Sofía, during the Princess of Asturias Awards ceremony in 2024

After a one-month delay to avoid interfering with the electoral campaign of the 2023 general election, on 25 July 2023 the King and Queen inaugurated the Royal Collections Gallery, a new museum sponsored by Patrimonio Nacional, the government agency that guards the Crown assets. On 17 August 2023, King Felipe and Queen Letizia, together with Infanta Sofía, accompanied Princess Leonor to the General Military Academy, to begin three years of military training. Leonor used both her father's and her mother's surnames "Borbón Ortiz". In late August 2023, she travelled with her youngest daughter, Sofía, to Australia to see the final of the 2023 FIFA Women's World Cup between Spain and England. The Queen delivered the trophy to the World Champions, Spain, and celebrated with them on the pitch. Indirectly, this drew criticism to the British royal family for their absence from the event.

On 30 April 2024, State lawyer María Dolores Ocaña Madrid was appointed as private secretary to the Queen, being the first woman to hold the office. It was also announced that Maria Dolores Ocaña would take a step back from her role due to personal reasons. Journalist and presenter Marta Carazo of RTVE became the Queen's secretary on 1 September 2025.

On 3 November 2024, King Felipe, Queen Letizia, Prime Minister Sánchez and Valencian president Carlos Mazón were violently confronted during a meeting with victims of the October 2024 Spain floods in Paiporta in the Valencian Community, who threw mud and objects at them and injured two bodyguards. Although the Prime Minister had to be evacuated, the monarchs remained there listening to the complaints and requests of the residents. After the incident, the visit to neighboring towns was postponed, but the Royal Household confirmed that they would return "in the next few days". The King returned to the region on 12 November to check the efforts of the Armed Forces in the disaster and, on 19 November, he and the Queen resumed the visit canceled two weeks earlier. On 22 December 2024, the King and Queen made a surprise visit to Catarroja to check in again to see how the residents were doing. In this visit they were accompanied by Princess Leonor and Infanta Sofía who were on their respective school breaks. On 12 March 2025 to show their continued support for Valencia they visited the people again to check in on what has happened since then.

In 2024, Letizia accompained her husband in State visits to the Netherlands (16–18 April 2024) and Italy (10–12 December 2024) and, in 2025, to Egipt (16–19 September 2025) and China (10–13 November 2025). She also continued his development cooperation trips, visiting Guatemala (4–6 June 2024) and Cape Verde (25–27 March 2025).

The Queen inaugurating the 2026–2027 vocational training course at the Ribera del Tajo High School in Talavera de la Reina, Toledo

On 19 July 2026, at MetLife Stadium, she alongside King Felipe, Princess Leonor, and Infanta Sofía attended the 2026 World Cup Final against Argentina.

On 23 September 2026, the Queen made a solo trip to Brussels to participate in the events marking World Cancer Research Day, an initiative promoted by the Spanish Association Against Cancer—of which Letizia is the honorary president.

A few days later, in her role of promoting education, she inaugurated the 2026–2027 vocational training course at Ribera del Tajo High School in Talavera de la Reina.

== Titles, styles, honours and arms ==
=== Titles and styles ===
Letizia's royal cyphers as Princess of Asturias (left) and as queen (right)

Upon marrying Felipe, Letizia was styled "Her Royal Highness The Princess of Asturias", as consort of the Prince of Asturias, heir to the Spanish Crown. Likewise, Letizia had the right to use the other titles that belonged to Felipe as heir (these were those of Princess of Girona, Princess of Viana, Duchess of Montblanc, Countess of Cervera, and Lady of Balaguer).

After the accession of Felipe to the Spanish throne, Letizia became queen consort and was styled as "Her Majesty The Queen". In private conversations, the correct etiquette is to address her initially as "Your Majesty" (Majestad) and thereafter as "Madam" (Señora), but never as "You" (Tú or Usted).

=== Honours ===
On 21 May 2004, the day before her marriage to Felipe, Letizia was appointed a Dame Grand Cross of the Royal and Distinguished Order of Charles III. Since then, Letizia has received different appointments and decorations by foreign states and other Spanish honours.

=== Arms ===
The coat of arms of Queen Letizia was adopted in 2014, based on the design created for her by the Asturian Academy of Heraldry and Genealogy (Academia Asturiana de Heráldica y Genealogía) in May 2004 and approved by Vicente de Cadenas y Vicent, Cronista Rey de Armas; this was used by her as Princess of Asturias. The revision of 2014 was confirmed by Don Alfonso Ceballos-Escalera y Gil, Chronicler of Arms for Castile and León.

The Queen's coat of arms has no official status, as in Spain only those of the King, former King Juan Carlos, and of the Princess of Asturias are so recognized by Royal Decree.

Coat of arms of Queen Letizia of Spain
Crest The queen consort's crown (crown's arches differenced as consort) Escutcheon Impaled I, quarterly 1st Gules a castle Or, triple-embattled and voided gate and windows, with three towers each triple-turreted, of the field, masoned Sable and ajoure Azure (Castile); 2nd Argent a lion rampant Purpure crowned Or, langued and armed Gules (Leon); 3rd Or, four pallets Gules (Crown of Aragon) and 4th Gules a cross, saltire and orle of chains linked together Or, a centre point Vert Argent (Navarre); enté en point, with a pomegranate proper seeded Gules, supported, sculpted and leafed in two leaves Vert (Granada); inescutcheon Azure bordure Gules, three fleurs-de-lys Or (Bourbon-Anjou); II, quarterly 1st and 4th Azure, an eight points star Or a bordure chequy Gules and Argent (Ortiz); 2nd and 3rd Or, a rose Gules barbed and seeded Vert (Rocasolano). Orders The Grand Cross of the Order of Charles III ribbon. Banner The Queen's personal Royal Standard is that of the Spanish monarch (crimson square flag) bordered with the main colours of the arms of her family (blue and yellow) and charged with her personalized coat of arms. Symbolism Queen Letizia's personalized coat of arms impales her husband's shield to the dexter (viewer's left) with her family arms -1st and 4th quarters, the arms of her father Jesús Ortiz; 2nd and 3rd quarters, the arms of her maternal grandfather Francisco Rocasolano. Previous versions From 2004 to 2014 The coat of arms used as the princess was the whole differenced with a label of three points Azure (used as a difference of the Spanish heir-apparent) and the crown as Spanish heir-apparent, it had four half-arches (with Crown's arches differenced as consort).

== See also ==
- Joyas de pasar

Letizia Ortiz Rocasolano Born: 15 September 1972
Spanish royalty
Preceded by Sophia of Greece and Denmark	Queen consort of Spain; 2014–present	Incumbent
