= Forward College =

Higher education college

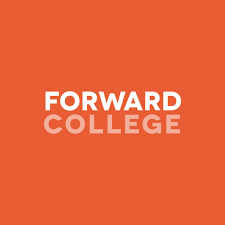
- Motto: Make your studies a journey
- Type: Private higher education institution
- Established: September 2021
- Founders: Boris Walbaum, Celine Boisson, Jeffrey Sampson
- Accreditation: Ministère de l’Enseignement supérieur et de la Recherche (France)
- Location: 48°49′13″N 2°20′19″E
- Website: forward-college.eu

Forward College is a European higher education institution founded by Boris Walbaum, Celine Boisson and Jeffrey Sampson in September 2021. It operates campuses in Lisbon, Paris, and Berlin, with students spending one academic year at each campus during their studies. Investors in Forward College include Xavier Niel.

== Academic profile ==
=== Accreditation ===
Forward College is a recognised teaching centre of the University of London, and a state-recognised higher education institution, accredited by the French Ministry of Higher Education and Research.

=== Courses ===
Forward College offers seven academic bachelor's degrees from the University of London Worldwide, designed by the London School of Economics and King's College London and awarded by the University of London. Disciplines offered include business, management, economics, politics, international relations, data science, business analytics, and psychology.

The college also offers three degrees designed and awarded entirely by Forward College, including an "open bachelor's" programme, inspired by the US liberal arts model, that allows students to explore a range of subjects in the first year before specialising in the second and third years. The other two programmes are "philosophy, politics and economics" (PPE) and "psychology, politics, law and economics" (PPLE). All three independent programmes are accredited by the French Ministry of Higher Education and Research.

Bachelor's courses are offered at different intensities: standard bachelor's degrees (180 ECTS credits) with a major subject and possibly one minor subject, bachelor's+ degrees (220 ECTS credits) combining a bachelor's degree with a major subject and one or two minor subjects, and double bachelor's degrees (260 ECTS credits) with two major subjects and one minor subject.

=== Reputation and rankings ===
In 2025, Forward College was awarded the Global Student Satisfaction Award for Student–Teacher Interaction by Studyportals.

== Notable people ==
Infanta Sofia of Spain, daughter of King Felipe VI and Queen Letizia, is attending Forward College. Her enrolment has received attention in international media outlets, confirming her studies at the institution's campuses in Lisbon, Paris, and Berlin.
