= Pura Lopez =

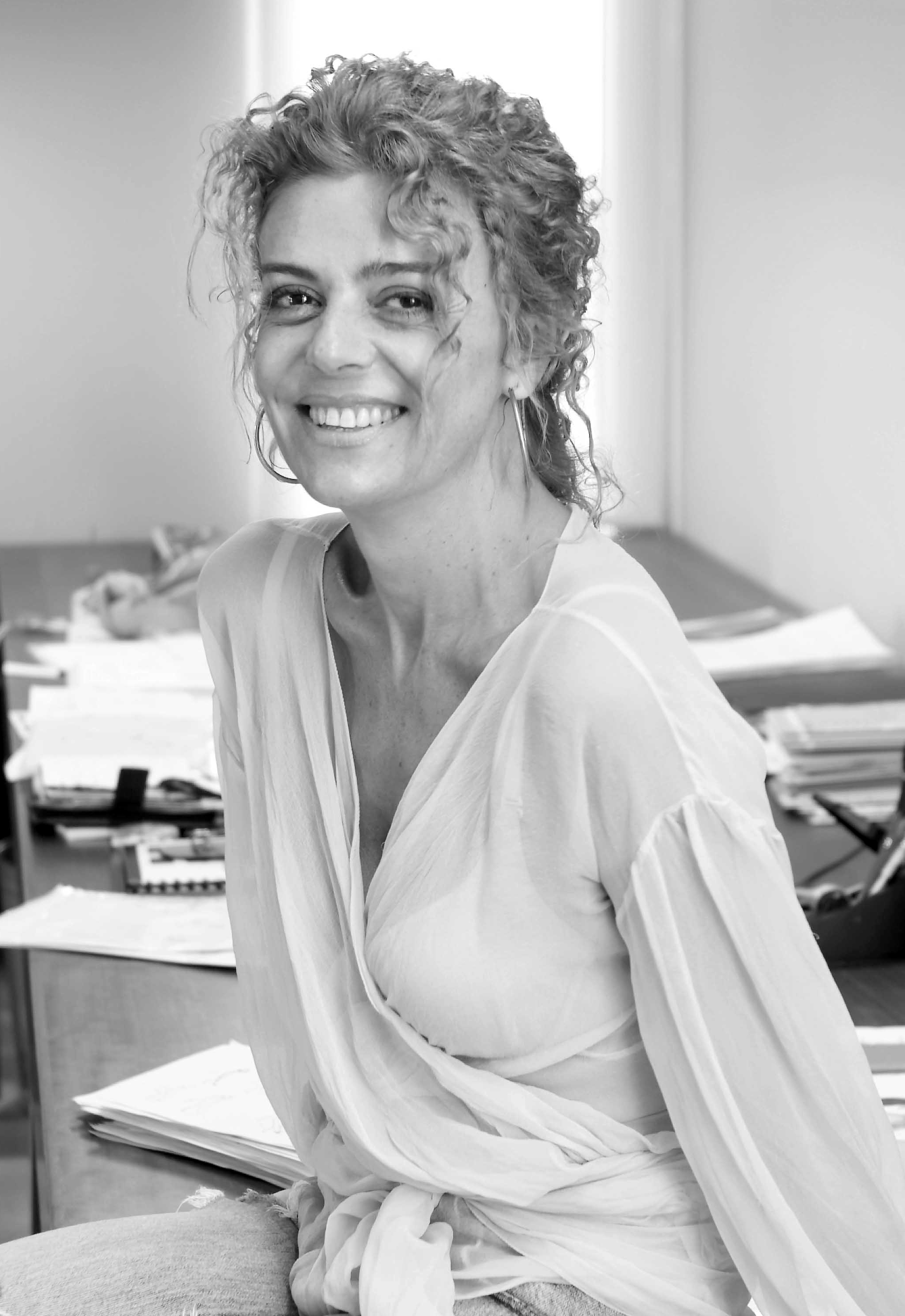
- Born: Pura Lopez Segarra; 29 September 1962 (age 63); Elche, Spain
- Occupation: Shoe designer
- Years active: 1986–present
- Parents: Antonio López Moreno (father); Josefina Segarra García (mother)
- Website: Official website

Pura Lopez (born 29 September 1962 in Elche, Spain) is a Spanish shoe designer, director of the design department of the Pura Lopez brand. She is a shoe designer for Royal Family members and Spanish cinema.

== Early life ==
Pura Lopez was born in Elche, Alicante, Spain, the daughter of Antonio Lopez Moreno, a shoe manufacturer who founded his company as a family business in 1964 during the rapid growth of the shoe industry in [Spain].

Lopez was growing surrounded by shoes and everything related to shoe production. Her observations and attention to the techniques gave her deep knowledge of the shoe construction and design concepts. Later, in the interview for the Spanish Magazine Surrealista, Lopez admitted that she was always attracted by art and creative process but she never really thought to work neither in the shoe industry nor in fashion.

In 1979 Lopez entered the School of Applied Arts and Creative Careers of Alicante to study the Interior Design.

In 1981 she proceeds with her education entering the School of Arts and Design of Barreira in Valencia, where she studies Fashion Design.

In the summer of 1984 Lopez went to New York City, where she started attending a specialized course on Clothing Fashion Design in the Fashion Institute of Technology. A year later she went to Milan, to study footwear design and construction in ARSUTORIA School. That became a significant period in Lopez's life. She stayed in every-day contact with the fashion world, often attended fashion shows and pret-a-porter runways to learn as much as possible about the trends and fashion world.

In 1986 Lopez joined her family business. She started working in the Department of Design, Development and Production for two significant collections: "Josephine" and "Academia". Soon after her arrival the Lopez family changed their strategy and started a new ladies shoe brand.

In 1987 the concept of Pura Lopez brand was developed. The main figure is a woman of wide culture, fashion-oriented, very feminine whilst strong.

After a family council, the new brand was named after its creator. Currently the second generation of Lopez family conducts all the affairs of the company where Lopez is in charge of the Design Department and her brother, Antonio Lopez Segarra is CEO.

The distinctive particularity of Pura Lopez shoes is the color spectrum of pastels, which vary depending on the season. Thanks to accurate calculations of the form construction Lopez manages to create the models with high heels and platforms without compromising the stability. Lopez chose her moto: "Your shoes should inspire you to walk" and her concept: "a shoe is a main accessory in the woman’s wardrobe" considering it to be an indicator between the platitude and elegance. According to Lopez "The shoes are communication."

Today the Pura Lopez brand is the basis of family business Dalph International founded in 1956.

== Recognition ==
Admission to the runway became Lopez's big victory. Her models are being used for shows and catwalks by such designers as Cibeles y Gaudí, Juanjo Oliva, Andrés Sardá, Javier Larraínzar and Guillermina Baeza.

Moreover, she collaborates with such houses as La Perla, Devota & Lomba, Joaquim Verdu, Roberto Verino, Roberto Torretta and participates in Madrid Fashion Week.

In 1998, Pura Lopez represented the Spanish shoe industry in 1998 Lisbon World Exposition in Lisbon, Portugal.

Lopez works with Haute couture, creating special occasion shoes for the members of the European Monarchies such as Mary Donaldson, Mary, Crown Princess of Denmark and Queen Letizia of Spain, who prefers to wear Pura Lopez shoes in different occasions of celebrations.

Howbeit the most significant moment in Lopez's career was 22 May 2004 - the wedding day of Queen Letizia of Spain and King Felipe VI, when the bride was wearing the dress of Spanish designer Manuel Pertegas and Pura Lopez shoes. Other guests followed the bride's lead and wore Pura Lopez shoes as well: Infanta Cristina of Spain and her cousin, Princess Alexandra of Greece.

The wedding was watched by more than 25 million television viewers in Spain alone, and was broadcast throughout the world. After that Lopez was adored and requested as wedding shoes designer.

In 2009 Lopez received Fuenso International Shoe Award.

On 30 March 2012 the Association of businessmen, professionals and managers recognized Lopez as the best businesswoman of the year.

At the moment Pura Lopez is present in more than 1000 places worldwide. Those are fashion boutiques, monobrand store and department stores of the whole world. in Galeries Lafayette on Boulevard Haussmann in Paris, France and Galleries Lafayette in Casablanca, Morocco.

The average retail price of Pura Lopez shoes is about 250—350 euro.

In February 2012 Pura Lopez opens their first show room in the center of Milan.

== Shoes ==
Lopez creates two collections a year that embrace several fashion concepts. As a result, each collection goes up to 200 styles per season.

That large amount is due to the fact that Lopez always has in mind all the types of women that she is designing for. She considers the bone structure, the height and time of the day. First she creates a group of High Fashion - Runway shoes. Then the same process is repeated for classic evergreen style; then for chic and elegant style; then for conservative target etc. But not all the models are then exposed. After the development Lopez chooses only the most interesting and innovative ones and sends them to the production.

Pura Lopez shoes are produced in eight separate factories that belong to the company in Elche, Spain. Only Italian leather is used for the shoes, as well as modern and antique technologies of shoe-making. The designer uses a lot of texture and "crust" nappa and is not afraid to apply a "vintage effect", i.e. artificial leather aging that makes the product more attractive when it is being used a lot.

The production capacity of the company is divided into five lines up to 1800 pairs a week each.

From 2009 Lopez began to expand the bag line and to introduce them to the main collections.

== Cinema ==
The designs of Pura Lopez models were used in such movies as La Dama Boba of Manolo Iborra Martinez based on the play by Lope de Vega, Insomnia by Chuz Guttieres, Kika by Pedro Almodóvar Caballero, as well as in the French production of Asterix and Obelix.

But in all their glory the shoes appeared in the movie Manolete with Adrien Brody. Lopez was invited to create the design of the shoes worn by Penélope Cruz. The styles chosen for the movie reflect all the femininity and glamour of the 1940s women — the time when platforms, round pumps and high heels were especially relevant.

Lopez admitted that she liked her experience in the movie industry because it gave her a great possibility to express her creative potential without respecting any limits.

Pura Lopez shoes are worn by such celebrities as: Kylie Minogue, Monica, Penélope Cruz, Isabelle Fuhrman, Lea Michele, Kim Kardashian, and others.

== Interesting facts ==
- Lopez does not like to repeat the models so she never uses the same design without changing it at least a little bit in two collection in a row. That productivity requires a lot of time. Lopez says that she and her designers team could often stay in the studio for days choosing the colors and materials that match.
- Once Lopez decided to create an exclusive design just for her. But in the end she couldn't resist and included it in the main collection.
- Queen Letizia of Spain who is constantly called the «Princess of Fashion», frequently wears Pura Lopez shoes.
- Lopez doesn't like to give interviews. She can easily be seen in the Fairs and Presentations where she comes incognito.
