= Joyas de pasar =

Jewelry worn by the Queen of Spain

The joyas de pasar (transl. jewels to be passed down) are collection of historic jewels, privately owned by the head of the Spanish royal family, to be worn by the Queen of Spain on solemn occasions. The initial set of jewellery was gathered by Queen Victoria Eugenie, wife of King Alfonso XIII, and is transmitted to the next generation following the instructions that she left in her will. They are separate from the Regalia of Spain which is owned by the Spanish State.

== History ==
Princess Victoria Eugenie of Battenberg married King Alfonso XIII at the Church of Saint Jerome the Royal in Madrid on 31 May 1906. Alfonso had given his fiancée as a wedding gift a large tiara, a necklace, and a pair of earrings –all made of large diamonds and platinum– expressly designed by the Spanish jeweler Ansorena, as well as an old family necklace of large pearls.

Victoria Eugenie believed that the most important jewels that she had received should always end up in the hands of the head of the royal family, instead of ending up dispersed, for the use of the future Queens of Spain –regnant and consort–. So she listed in her will eight pieces of jewellery that were to be allocated to her son Juan, begging him to pass them on to her grandson Juan Carlos. These were mainly the jewels that she received as a wedding gift from her future husband, King Alfonso XIII, as well as other jewels received from Alfonso’s aunt, Infanta Isabel. She stated in her will that she felt that she had received these jewels in usufruct, meaning that she could use and enjoy them but that she did not own them, so she could neither disassemble them nor get rid of them. She left her other jewellery to be distributed between her daughters Infanta Beatriz and Infanta María Cristina. When she made her will in 1963, there was no monarch in Spain, but she believed that the monarchy would eventually be restored.

It was Princess María de las Mercedes, the wife of Infante Juan, the one who first called them joyas de pasar when Queen Victoria Eugenie gave her the pieces after the death of her husband King Alfonso XIII. The jewels passed to King Juan Carlos I at the time of his proclamation in 1975, but his wife Queen Sofía, in an act of prudence in the midst of the transition to democracy, waited until the Constitution was promulgated in 1978 to begin wearing them. They passed to King Felipe VI at the time of his proclamation in 2014 and since then they are worn by Queen Letizia on solemn occasions.

== Jewels ==
=== Initial pieces ===
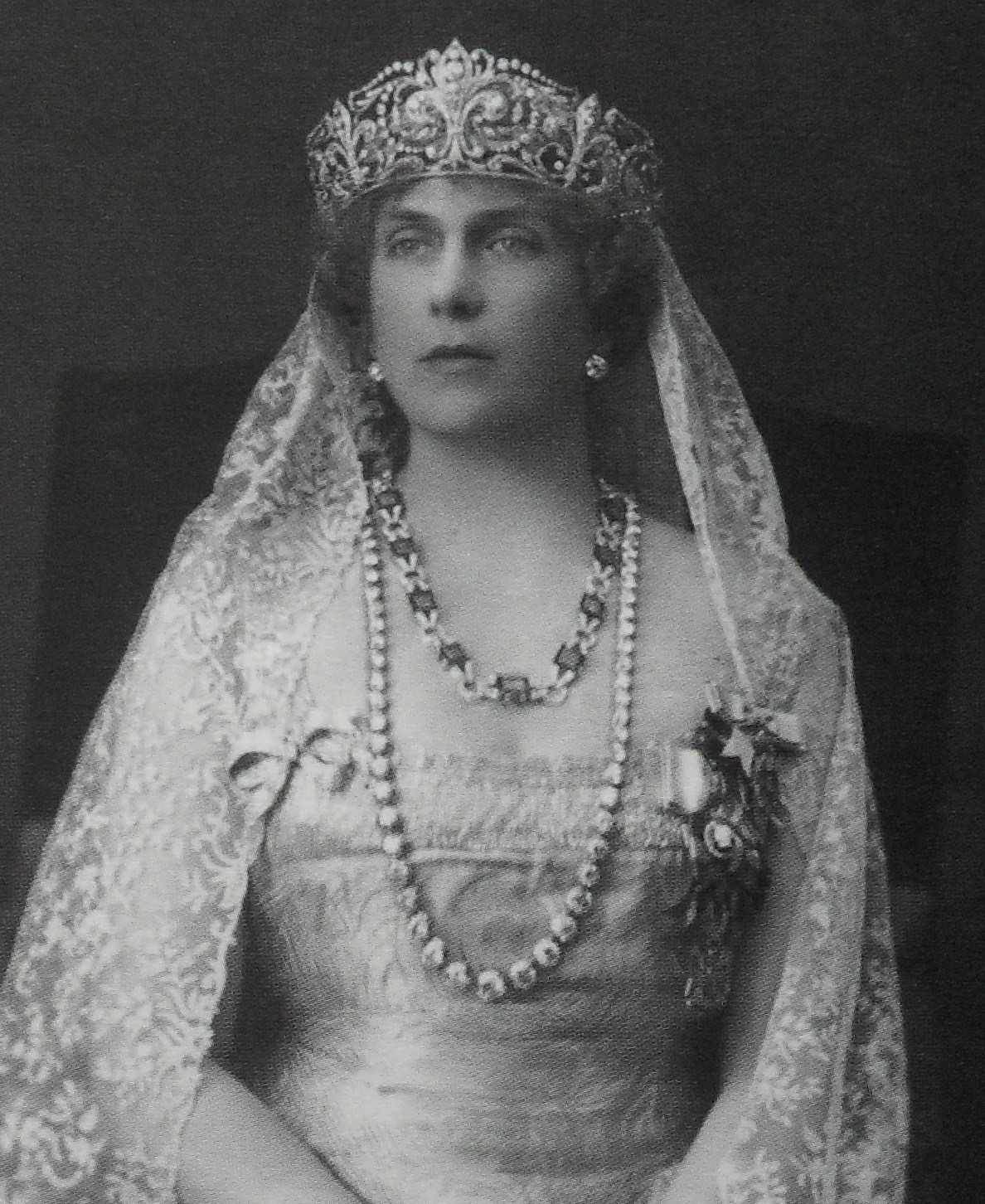
Portrait of Queen Victoria Eugenie wearing the fleurs-de-lis tiara, the chaton necklace, and the earrings, as well as a shorter emerald necklace, by Christian Franzen (1922).

Queen Victoria Eugenie listed in her will eight pieces of jewellery:

- Fleurs-de-lis tiara, designed by the Spanish jeweller Ansorena. King Alfonso XIII gave it to Princess Victoria Eugenie for their wedding in 1906. It is made of diamonds and mounted in platinum. It forms three fleurs-de-lis, the heraldic emblem of the Bourbons, joined by scrolls and leaves. In 1910 it was modified so that it could also be worn open. The fleurs-de-lis can also be used independently as brooches. It is known within the family as La buena (transl. The good one). As their most ostentatious tiara – although not the most valuable – , it has only been worn by the wives of the heads of the house. (Note: Although, it is not stated anywhere that the fleurs-de-lis tiara must only be worn by the Queens of Spain –reigning, consorts or aspirants–.) Queen Victoria Eugenie wore it and was portrayed with it on numerous occasions. (Note: Queen Victoria Eugenie wore the fleurs-de-lis tiara for last time at the gala dinner prior to the wedding of her granddaughter Infanta Pilar in 1967.) Her daughter-in-law María de las Mercedes wore it at the Coronation of Elizabeth II in 1953, as one of the very few occasions she used it. Queen Sofía and Queen Letizia have worn it on exceptional solemn occasions, especially in state visits of foreign heads of state to Spain or in state visits to foreign monarchies. Queen Letizia wore it at the state banquet for the Enthronement of Emperor Naruhito in 2019.
- The largest chaton necklace, designed by Ansorena. Also given by King Alsonso XIII to Princess Victoria Eugenie for their wedding. It was originally composed of thirty collets –rounded shape brilliant-cut diamonds set in Russian style with a platinum claw–. (Note: The chaton is a type of collet that consists of a metal ring that surrounds the stone and bends slightly over it, which allows the extension of the piece to be easily expanded or reduced.) Since then, King Alfonso XIII gifted her two new diamond collets in every celebration –such as her birthday, the birth of a child, an anniversary or Christmas– to add to the necklace. The necklace became so long that she divided it into two, one with thirty-eight collets and the other with twenty-seven, which she used to wear at the same time.
- The necklace of thirty-seven large pearls. Originally it was the engagement gift that Francisco de Asís gave to his cousin and fiancée, Queen Isabel II, in 1846. A year after her death in 1904 in exile, her jewelry was auctioned. King Alfonso XIII managed to acquire the necklace and give it to Princess Victoria Eugenie for their wedding.
- A diamond brooch from which hangs a pear-shaped pearl called La Peregrina II. Originally, a plump pear-shaped pearl hung from the thirty-seven pearl necklace, which in 1878 was separated from the main piece so that it could be sold separately. King Alfonso XIII managed to acquire it after the Queen's death and gave it to his fiancée Princess Victoria Eugenie mounted on a Louis XV style bow-shaped diamond brooch.
- A pair of earrings with a large diamond surrounded by smaller diamonds, designed by Ansorena. Also given by King Alsonso XII to Princess Victoria Eugenie for their wedding.
- Two exact diamond bracelets. They come from a small Cartier diamond tiara that King Alfonso XIII gave it to his fiancée upon her arrival in Spain in 1906. After her departure from Spain in 1931, she commissioned Bulgari to transform the tiara into two twin bracelets.
- Four short strands of large pearls. These pearls belonged to Infanta Isabel. It is unknown when the Infanta gave them to Victoria Eugenie.
- A brooch with a pale gray pearl surrounded by diamonds and from which a pear-shaped pearl hangs. It is a circular pin set with diamonds with a large pearl in the center and from which hangs a pear-shaped pearl that also belonged to Infanta Isabel.
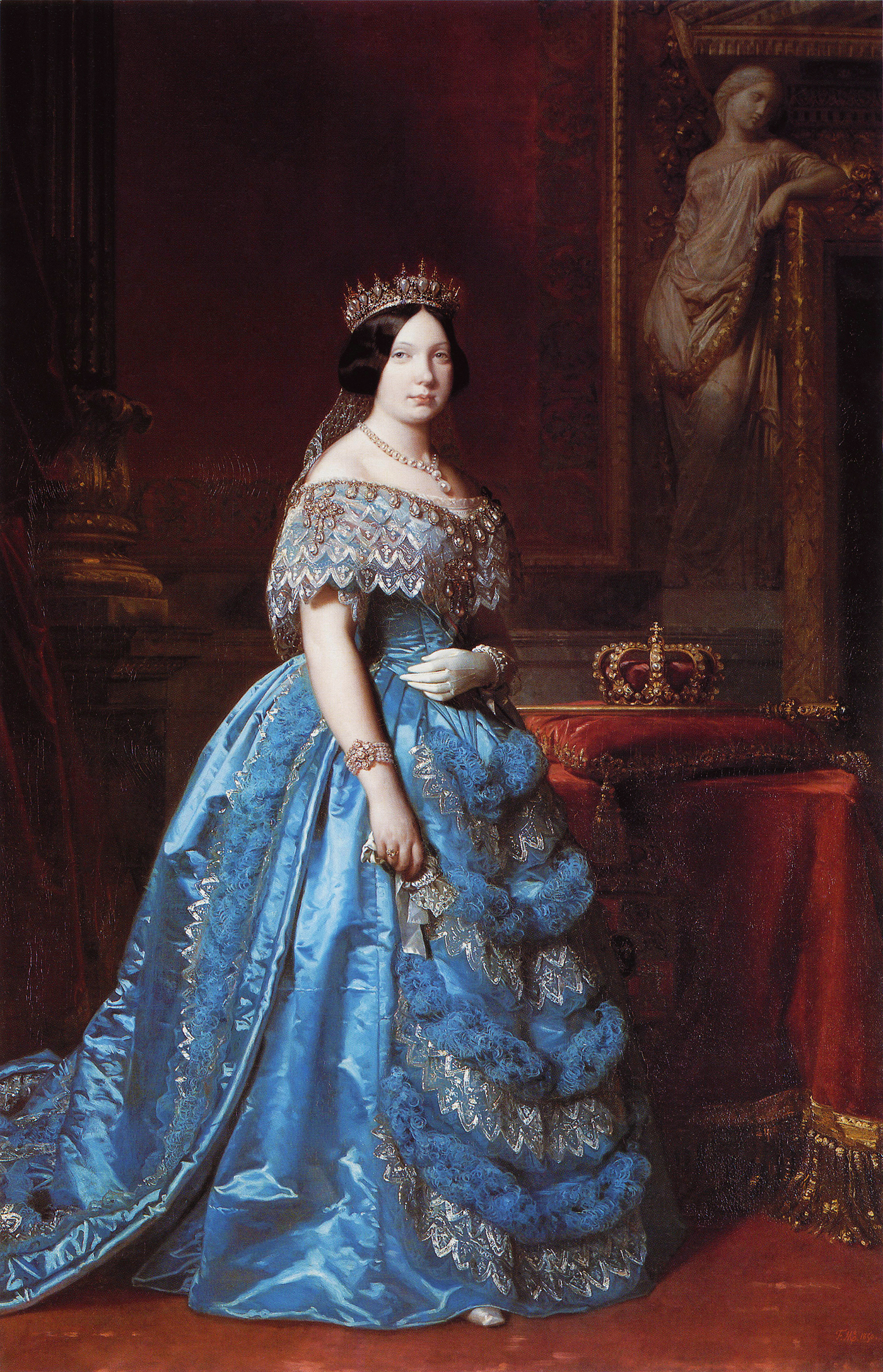
Portrait of Isabel II wearing the thirty-seven pearls necklace with La Peregrina II, by Federico de Madrazo (1850).

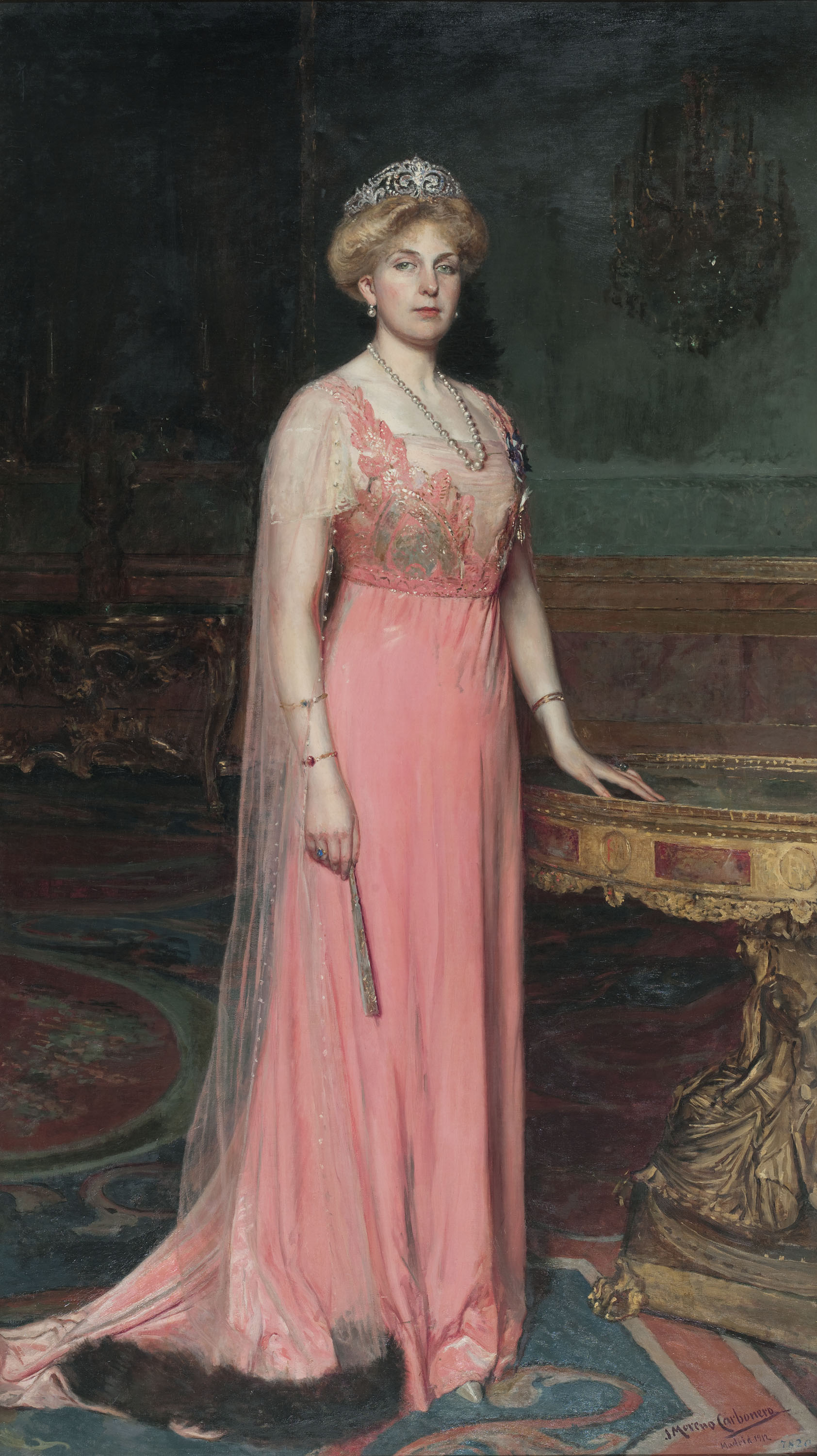
Portrait of Queen Victoria Eugenie wearing the fleurs-de-lis tiara, by José Moreno Carbonero (1912).

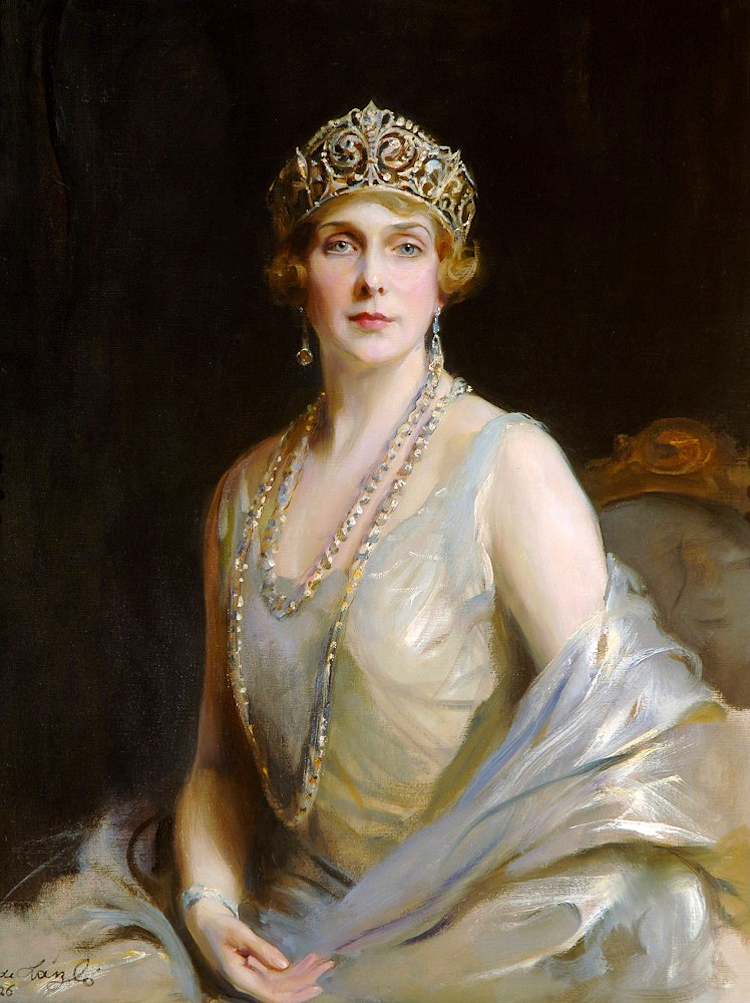
Portrait of Queen Victoria Eugenie wearing the fleurs-de-lis tiara, by Philip de László (1926).

=== Later pieces ===
Over the years other pieces have been added to the royal jewellery collection:

- Shell tiara, designed by Mellerio dits Meller in 1867, also known as the La Chata diadem, the nickname of Infanta Isabel. King Alfonso XIII gave it to Princess María de las Mercedes for her wedding with Infante Juan.
- Cartier pearl and diamond tiara, designed by Cartier in 1920 for Queen Victoria Eugenie. It is art-deco inspired and is fringed with diamonds and six large pearls on a platinum base. Initially it had a seventh pearl that crowned it and which was later removed. After her death, her daughter Infanta María Cristina received the tiara. King Juan Carlos I, María Cristina's nephew, bought it from her later.
- Maria Christina's pearl and diamond loop tiara, designed by Cartier in Kokoshnik style, for Queen Maria Christina, second wife of King Alfonso XII. It is made of platinum, diamonds and two rows of pearls, and is known within the family as La rusa (transl. The Russian one). King Alfonso XIII gave it to Princess María de las Mercedes for her wedding with Infante Juan. It was worn by Infanta Pilar in her wedding in 1967.
- Prussian tiara, designed by Koch in 1913, given by Kaiser Wilhelm II to his daughter, Princess Victoria Louise, for her marriage. It was a gift to Princess Sofía from her mother, Queen Frederica, for her wedding in 1962, where she wore it. It was also worn by Letizia in her wedding in 2004.
- Floral tiara, designed by J.P. Collins in 1879, originally gifted to Queen Maria Christina, it was sold after her death in 1929. It was bought later by the Spanish Government and given to Princess Sofía for her wedding in 1962. It was worn by Infanta Cristina in her wedding in 1997.
- Princess tiara, designed by Ansorena in 2010 for Princess Letizia. It is a diamond diadem with a fleur-de-lis and pearls. Although at first the tiara was believed to be a gift from Prince Felipe to his wife, it was the jeweler itself that confirmed to ¡Hola! that the gift came from themselves.
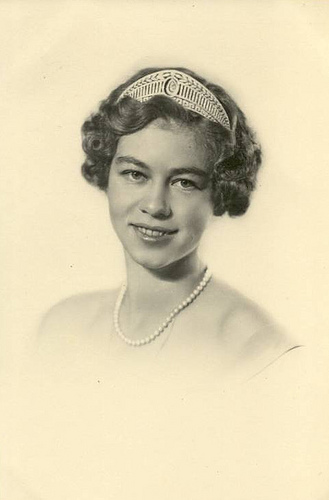
Portrait of Princess Frederica of Hanover wearing the Prussian tiara (c. 1930–36).

== Examples of use in state visits ==
- On 22 March 1983, at the state banquet offered at the Royal Palace of Madrid to King Carl XVI Gustaf and Queen Silvia in their state visit to Spain, Queen Sofía wore the fleurs-de-lis tiara for the first time, and she paired it with the earrings and the twin bracelets. Queen Silvia wore her Connaught tiara.
- On 22 April 1986, at the state banquet offered by Queen Elizabeth II at Windsor Castle to the King and Queen of Spain in their state visit to the United Kingdom, Queen Sofía wore the fleurs-de-lis tiara and the earrings. Queen Elizabeth II wore her Queen Alexandra’s kokoshnik tiara, the Queen Mother Elizabeth wore her Greville honeycomb tiara, and Diana, Princess of Wales wore the Queen Mary’s lover’s knot tiara.
- On 17 October 1988, at the state banquet offered at the Royal Palace to Queen Elizabeth II and Prince Philip in their state visit to Spain, Queen Sofía wore the fleurs-de-lis tiara, the earrings, and the twin bracelets, Infanta Elena wore the floral tiara, Infanta Cristina wore the Prussian tiara, Infanta Pilar wore the Maria Christina's pearl and diamond loop tiara, and Infanta Margarita wore a tiara that had belonged to Infanta María Isabel. Queen Elizabeth II wore her Girls of Great Britain and Ireland tiara.
- On 9 June 2014, at the state banquet offered at the Royal Palace to the President of Mexico Enrique Peña Nieto in his state visit to Spain, Queen Sofía wore the fleurs-de-lis tiara, the earrings, the chaton necklace, and the twin bracelets for the last time. Princess Letizia wore the floral tiara.
- On 22 February 2017, at the state banquet offered at the Royal Palace to the President of Argentina Mauricio Macri in his state visit to Spain, Queen Letizia wore the fleurs-de-lis tiara for the first time, and she paired it with the earrings and the twin bracelets.
- On 12 July 2017, at the state banquet offered by Queen Elizabeth II at Buckingham Palace to the King and Queen of Spain in their state visit to the United Kingdom, Queen Letizia wore the fleurs-de-lis tiara, the earrings, and one of the twin bracelets. Queen Elizabeth II wore her Brazilian aquamarine parure tiara, necklace, bracelet, and earrings, Camilla, Duchess of Cornwall wore the Greville honeycomb tiara, and Catherine, Duchess of Cambridge wore the Queen Mary’s lover’s knot tiara.
- On 23 November 2021, at the state banquet offered by King Carl XVI Gustaf at Stockholm Palace to the King and Queen of Spain in their state visit to Sweden, Queen Letizia wore the fleurs-de-lis tiara, the earrings, and the twin bracelets. Queen Silvia wore her cameo parure tiara, Crown Princess Victoria wore the aquamarine kokoshnik tiara, and Princess Sofia wore her wedding tiara.
- On 6 November 2023, at the state banquet offered by Queen Margrethe II at Christiansborg Palace to the King and Queen of Spain in their state visit to Denmark, Queen Letizia wore the fleurs-de-lis tiara and one of the twin bracelets. Queen Margrethe II wore her Danish emerald parure tiara, necklace, and earrings, and Crown Princess Mary wore her Edwardian tiara.
