= Alonso Guerrero Pérez =

Spanish writer

Alonso Guerrero Pérez (born 12 November 1962) is a Spanish writer and professor. In addition to fiction, he has also written essays, literary criticism, and journalism.

== Biography ==
Born in Almendralejo (Badajoz), after his university studies he became a high school teacher. He was awarded some literature prizes: the prestigious "Premio Felipe Trigo" from Villanueva de la Serena (Badajoz) for his Tricotomía, in 1982; and the Premio Navarra de Novela for his Los años imaginarios in 1987.

== Personal life ==
On 7 August 1998 Alonso Guerrero married Letizia Ortiz, a Spanish journalist, in a simple civil ceremony at Almendralejo, after a 10-year courtship. They divorced in 1999. Ortiz went on to marry the future King Felipe VI, thus becoming Queen of Spain.

== Works ==
- Tricotomía (1982)
- Los años imaginarios (1987)
- Los ladrones de libros (Badajoz, Departamento de Publicaciones de la Excma. Diputación Provincial de Badajoz, 1991)
- El hombre abreviado (1998) ISBN 9788497931922
- El durmiente (1998)
- Fin del milenio en Madrid (1999)
- De la indigencia a la literatura (2004)
- El edén de los autómatas (2004) ISBN 9788401335174
- La muerte y su antídoto (2004) ISBN 8493375411
- Doce semanas del siglo XX (2007) ISBN 978-84-935610-2-4
- Un palco sobre la nada (2012) ISBN 9788492847174
- Un día sin comienzo (2014), about the 2004 Madrid train bombings ISBN 9788492847372
- El mundo sumergido (2016) ISBN 9788492847471
- El amor de Penny Robinson (2018) ISBN 978-84-17229-64-1
- Las mujeres felices son una quimera (2022)
