= Infanta Sofía of Spain =

Member of the Spanish royal family (born 2007)

Infanta Sofía
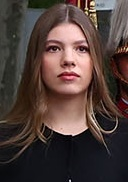
- Sofía in 2025
- Born: 29 April 2007 (age 19); Madrid, Spain
Names
- Sofía de Todos los Santos de Borbón y Ortiz
- House: Bourbon-Anjou
- Father: Felipe VI
- Mother: Letizia Ortiz Rocasolano
- Education: UWC Atlantic College (2023–2025); Forward College (2025–present)

Infanta Sofía of Spain (Sofía de Todos los Santos de Borbón y Ortiz; born 29 April 2007) is a member of the Spanish royal family. She is the younger daughter of King Felipe VI and Queen Letizia and, as such, is second in the line of succession to the Spanish throne.

Doña Sofía was born at the Ruber International Hospital in Madrid during the reign of her paternal grandfather, King Juan Carlos. She has received the same education as her sister, being educated at the Santa María de los Rosales School and, in 2023, she started an International Baccalaureate at the UWC Atlantic College in Wales, United Kingdom.

== Early life and family ==
Infanta Sofía was born on 29 April 2007 at 16:50 (CET) at the Ruber International Hospital in Madrid by means of a caesarean section, two days after due date. Like her elder sister, her birth was announced by the royal family to the press via SMS. It was announced that her umbilical cord stem cells would be sent to a European private bank in Belgium and to a Spanish public one. The parents, then the Prince and Princess of Asturias, did the same with Leonor's cells: they were taken to a private centre in Arizona, which caused controversy in Spain.

Doña Sofía was named after her paternal grandmother, Queen Sofía. She was christened on 15 July by the Archbishop of Madrid, Antonio María Rouco Varela, in the gardens of the Palacio de la Zarzuela. Her godparents are Paloma Rocasolano (her maternal grandmother) and Konstantin, Prince of Vidin (Konstantin-Assen de Bulgaria). Like her sister, she was given at her christening one name, plus the compound middle name de Todos los Santos (of All the Saints) that is a longtime naming tradition among the Spanish Bourbons.

She received her First Communion on 17 May 2017 at the parish Asunción de Nuestra Señora, and was accompanied by her parents, her older sister, her grandparents, her maternal great-grandmother Menchu Álvarez del Valle, her step-grandmother Ana Togores, and her godfather Konstantin-Assen of Bulgaria, Prince of Vidin. On 23 May 2023, she received the sacrament of confirmation.

== Education ==
Like her older sister, in September 2009, Doña Sofía started her education at the Escuela Infantil Guardia Real, the daycare for the children of the Spanish Royal Guard. On 13 September 2010, she began her first year of pre school at the Santa María de los Rosales School in Madrid. She later began her first year of primary school in September 2013. In August 2023, she began studying a 2-year International Baccalaureate programme at the UWC Atlantic College in the Vale of Glamorgan, Wales. She graduated on 24 May 2025.

After announcing in April 2025 that the Infanta had decided not to undergo military service, in July 2025 the Royal Household confirmed that she would study Politics and International Relations at Forward College, an institution affiliated with the University of London. The studies, which began in September 2025, will last three years and will span three European capitals: Lisbon, Paris and Berlin.

== Activities ==
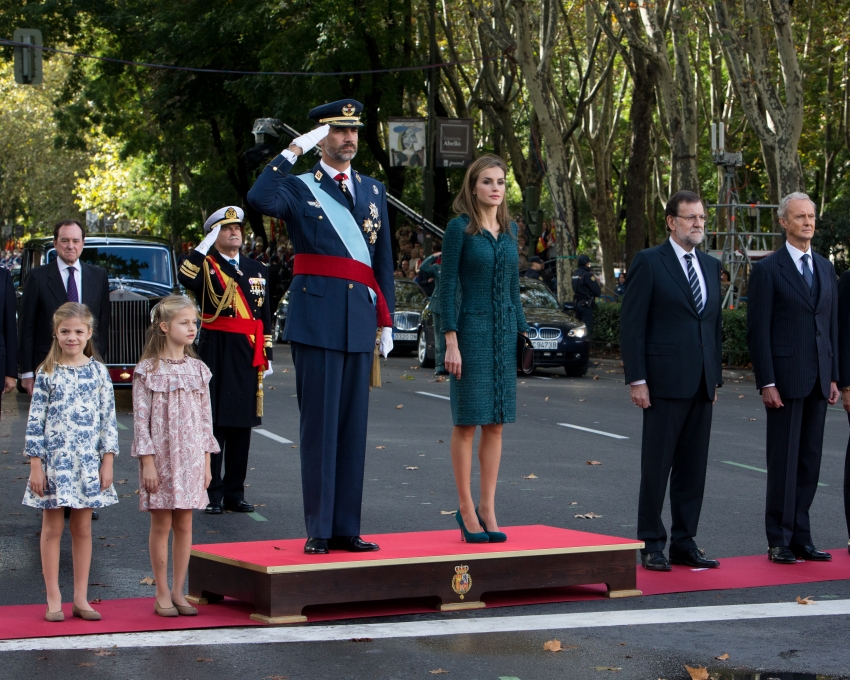
Infanta Sofía (left), along with the rest of the royal family and other authorities at the National Day celebrations on 12 October 2014.

As Infanta of Spain, it is very common to see her in official events with her parents and sister, such as the opening of Parliament, the National Day parade or the Princess of Asturias and Princess of Girona Awards ceremonies. At the age of 3, she attended her first event, an official reception at the Royal Palace on the occasion of the victory of the Spain national football team in the 2010 FIFA World Cup. In 2021, Infanta Sofía and Princess Leonor participated in their first joint act without their parents, representing the "A Tree for Europe" campaign of the European youth association Equipo Europa.

While her sister was studying abroad, she took center stage by accompanying her parents to different events, such as the 2021 and 2022 National Day parades and the 2023 Copa del Rey final.

On 16 July 2022, she accompanied her sister Leonor in her first international trip. Both royals traveled alone to support the Spain women's national football team, which was playing for a place in the quarterfinals of the UEFA Women's Euro 2022 against Denmark.

In late August 2023, she travelled with her mother, Queen Letizia, to Australia to see the final of the 2023 FIFA Women's World Cup between Spain and England. The Queen and the Infanta delivered the trophy to the World Champions, Spain, and celebrated with them on the pitch. Indirectly, this drew criticism to the British royal family for their absence from the event.

In July 2024, she travelled with her father, King Felipe, to watch the Spain national football team compete in the UEFA Euro 2024 final. Sofia presented the trophy with her father following their victory.

In April 2024, Patrimonio Nacional announced that she would be a patron of a photo contest. The photography contest aims to showcase the beauty of Spain. On 5 December 2024 announced that the photography contest would only feature Sofía and not her parents or her older sister. She handed the awards on December 13, at the Royal Palace. This marked her first solo act. Sofía is due to present the second edition of the photography contest later in 2025. In addition to the photography contest, a painting contest formerly known as “Ciudad de Hellín (City of Hellín)” will be changed to the “Certamen Internacional de Pintura “Infanta Sofía” de Hellín (International Painting Contest of Infanta Sofía of Hellín)” to honour her.

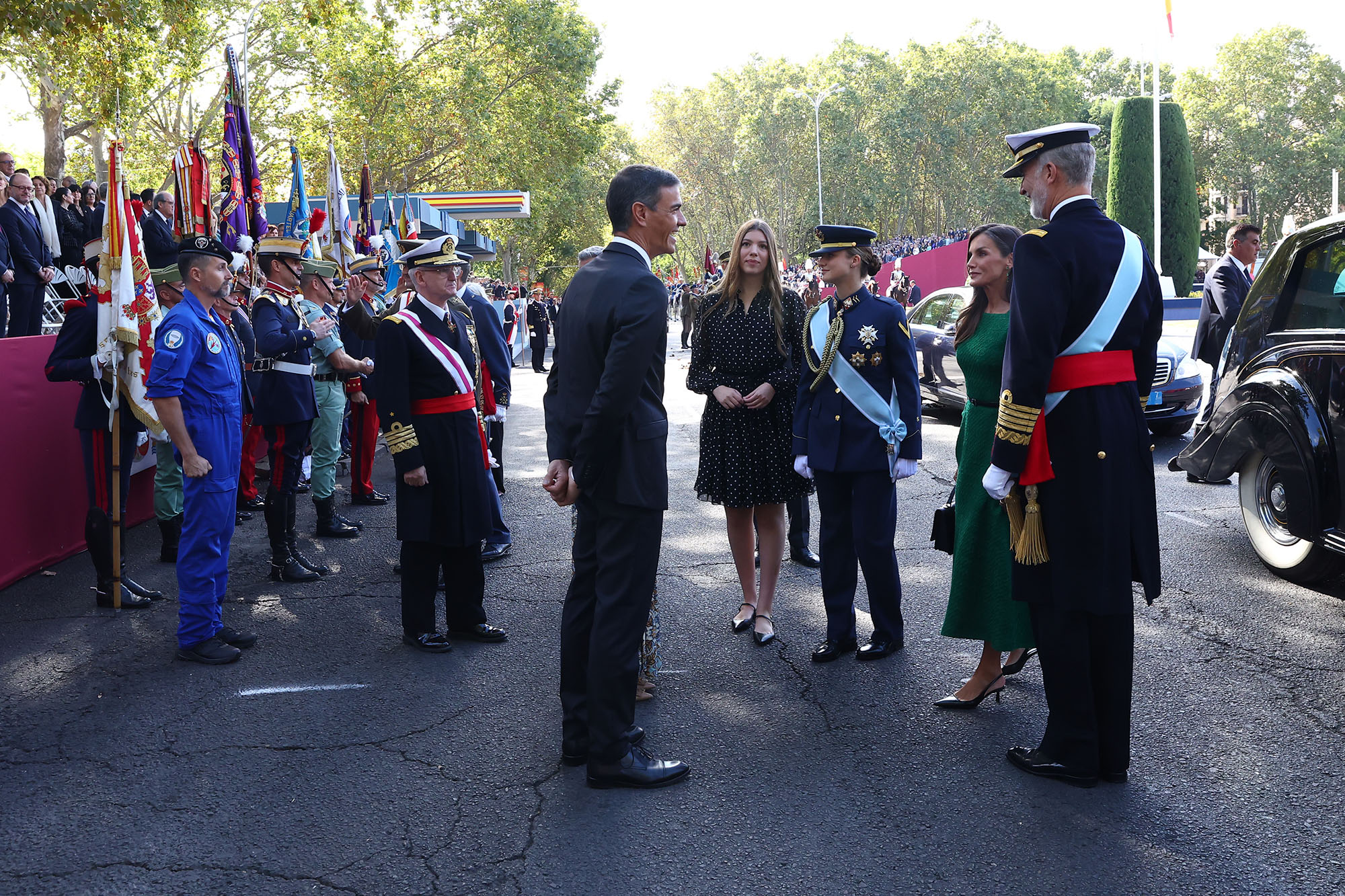
The royal family talking with the prime minister

After graduating in the spring of 2025, Sofia resumed her official duties in July that year. On July 15, she joined her parents in an audience to the Board of Trustees of the Spanish Committee of the United World Colleges Foundation. The following day, she accompanied her parents to the graduation ceremony of the new Navy officers, among whom was her sister. At the end of the month, she attended the Princess of Girona Awards ceremony and the UEFA Women's Euro 2025 final.

On 4 August 2025, Infanta Sofía along with her sister Leonor, Princess of Asturias, attended the annual reception at Marivent Palace for Balearic Islands' authorities and personalities. The reception also had King Felipe VI, Queen Letizia, and Queen Sofía in attendance. This event marked the first reception attended by Leonor and Sofía.

On 17 October 2025, she met with the President of Portugal for a private casual meeting. Her older sister Leonor’s first official visit to Portugal took place on 12 July 2024. She met with the President as her first year of university is taking place in Portugal. The next two years of her academic career will take her to Paris, then Berlin respectively.

In January 2026, Sofía attended the funeral of Princess Irene of Greece and Denmark and replaced her grandmother, Queen Sofía, in some public events.

On the 6th and 7th of June 2026 she attended events relating to the Papal visit of Pope Leo XIV.

Since 2026 she has been the honorary president of the Ibercaja Foundation's Leading Teachers (Docentes Referentes) program, an initiative that aims to reward teachers who excel in their educational work. On 8 July 2026 she delivered her first official speech at the first edition of the Leading Teachers Awards in Zaragoza.

== Titles, styles and honours ==
As children of the prince of Asturias, Doña Sofía was born infanta and styled "Her Royal Highness Infanta Doña Sofia". Although with the same dignity and status as a prince, Sofia does not hold the title of princess, because in Spain only the heir to the Crown is allowed to carry that title.

Following her father's accession to the throne on 19 June 2014, Sofia is second in line to the Spanish throne.

=== Honours ===
- Knight Grand Cross of the Royal Order of Isabella the Catholic (GYC, 30 April 2025).

== See also ==
- Princess of Asturias Awards
- Politics of Spain

Infanta Sofía of Spain House of Bourbon Cadet branch of the Capetian dynasty Born: 29 April 2007
Lines of succession
Preceded by The Princess of Asturias	Line of succession to the Spanish throne 2nd in line	Succeeded by The Duchess of Lugo
