= Guard of honour =

Military honour guard unit

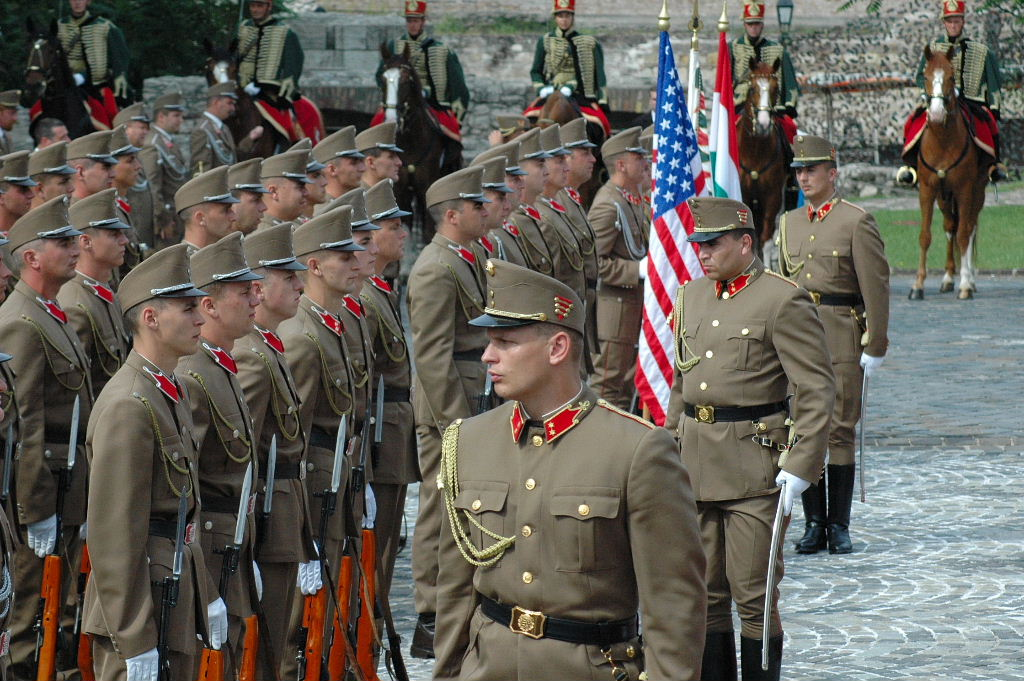
Soldiers from the Hungarian Defence Forces form a guard of honour at a welcome ceremony for US president George W. Bush's visit to Hungary, 2006

A guard of honour (Commonwealth English), honor guard (American English) or ceremonial guard, is a group of people, typically drawn from the military, appointed to perform ceremonial duties – for example, to receive or guard a head of state or other dignitaries, the fallen in war, or to attend at state ceremonials, especially funerals. In military weddings, especially those of commissioned officers, a guard, composed usually of service members of the same branch, form the sabre arch. In principle, any military unit could act as a guard of honour. In some countries, certain units are specially assigned to undertake guard of honour postings or other public duties. Republican guards, royal guards and foot guards frequently have ceremonial duties assigned to them.

Guards of honour also serve in the civilian world for fallen police officers, firefighters, and other civil servants. Uniformed firefighting and law enforcement personnel render military-style salutes, and color guards present the colors at funerals and memorial services for fallen firefighters, law enforcement personnel and other civil servants. Certain religious bodies, especially churches of the Anglican Communion and the Methodist movement, have the tradition of an honour guard at the funeral of an ordained elder, in which all other ordained elders present "guard the line" between the door of the church and the grave, or hearse if the deceased is to be buried elsewhere or cremated. Catholic chivalric orders, such as the Order of the Holy Sepulchre and the Sovereign Military Order of Malta, provide guards of honour for deceased knights and high-ranking officers during funerals. The practice of providing a guard of honour as a mark of respect also occurs in sports, especially throughout the Commonwealth of Nations.

In football, this practice has increasingly appeared in recent years. In leagues like England’s Premier League and Spain’s La Liga, teams often give a guard of honour to the champions at the first home match of the following season, showing respect and sportsmanship for their achievement. This gesture has become a widely recognized symbol of recognition and fair play in modern football.

== Countries ==
Guards of honour have been mounted by a number of military forces, uniformed paramilitary organizations, and civilian emergency services.

=== Africa ===
==== Algeria ====
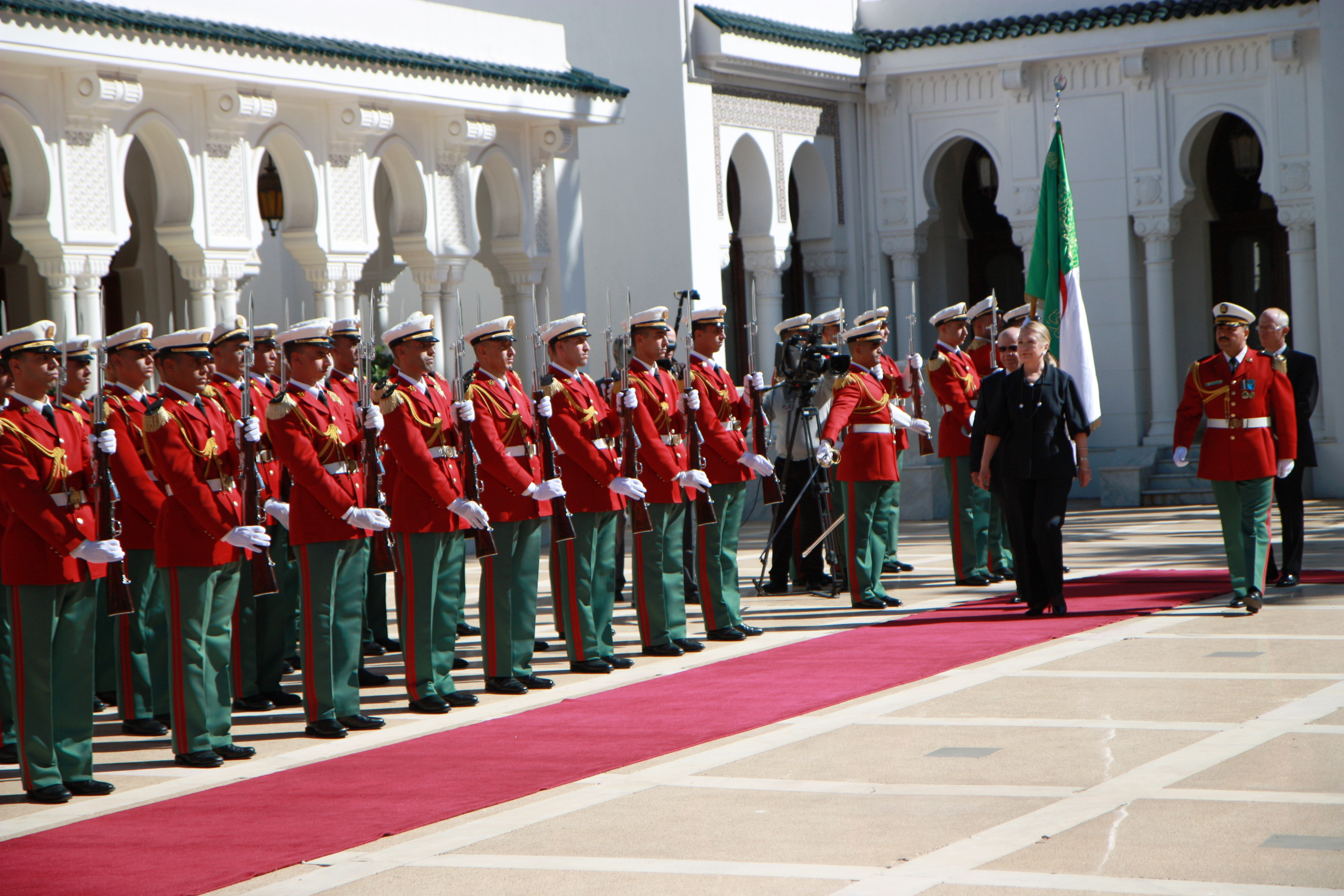
U.S. Secretary of State Hillary Clinton inspects a guard of honour formed by the Algerian Republican Guard, 2012

The Algerian Republican Guard is a mainly ceremonial military corps of the Algerian Army. Composed of 6,000 troops, it is very similar in its formation style to equivalent units in the French Army. The Republican Guard includes a military band and a cavalry unit, the uniform and traditions of which are based on those of the famous Berber cavalry, the Numidian cavalry, the French cavalry, and the Arab cavalry, as well as infantry.

==== Egypt ====
The Egyptian Republican Guard is a division level unit in the Egyptian Army which is the seniormost unit in the Egyptian Armed Forces that has the responsibility of defending the President of Egypt, as well as major presidential and national institutions. It is a type of guard regiment that is composed of dozens upon dozens of armored brigades, mechanized brigades and divisional artillery, Being the seniormost unit in the armed forces, the Republican Guard Division is the only major military unit allowed in central Cairo besides the troops of intelligence services and Central Security Forces.

==== Namibia ====
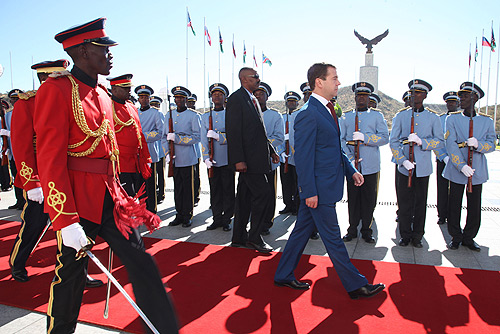
Russian president Dmitry Medvedev inspects a guard of honour formed by the 21 Ceremonial Guard Battalion of the Namibian Defence Force, 2009

The Guard of Honour unit in Namibia is the 21 Ceremonial Guard Battalion of the Namibian Defence Force. Falling under the 21 Brigade based in Windhoek. It was part of the presidential security detail until removed from this role and put on honour guard duty.

==== Nigeria ====
The members of the Nigerian Presidential Guard Brigade are elite Nigerian soldiers who guard the residence of the President of the Federal Republic and his or her guests as well as performing ceremonial duties. It is similar to the United States Secret Service in that its members also provide security for visiting heads of state. The brigade performs a weekly changing of the guard ceremony outside Aso Villa and stands guard at the Presidential Villa. Aside from that, the guards brigade also mounts the guard of honour for state visits, as well as the Independence Day Military Parade in Abuja. The brigade is the senior unit in the Nigerian Army's order of battle.

==== Senegal ====
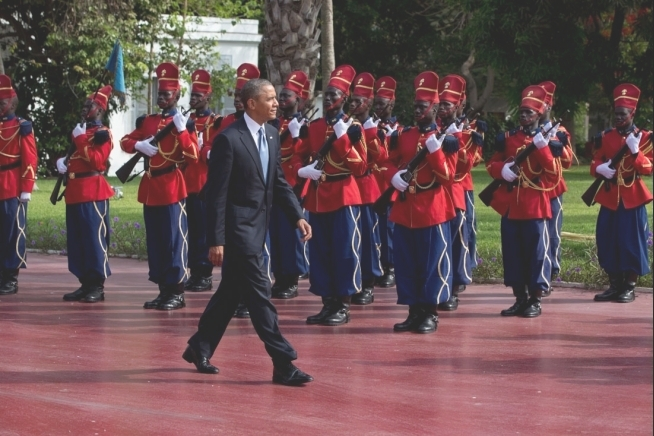
U.S. president Barack Obama inspects a guard of honour formed by the Red Guard of Senegal, 2013.

The Red Guard of Senegal is a Senegalese Gendarmerie unit that is responsible for maintaining the security of the President of Senegal. It is similar to the ceremonial elements in the French Republican Guard. The unit's uniform is derived from the French colonial Spahi. The Red Guard is under the direct command of the Security Legion of the Senegalese Mobile Gendarmerie. It is composed of many units that serve ceremonial duties, with the most notable being the honour guard battalion, which an infantry unit, and the mounted squadron.

==== South Africa ====
The guard of honour unit in South Africa was the State Presidents Guard (Staatspresidentseenheid) until 1990. The unit has since been replaced by the National Ceremonial Guard in the South African National Defence Force. Permanent honour guards in the country had not existed prior to the Staatspresidentseenheid's founding in 1967. In compensation for a lack of ceremonial units, the Citizen Force and the Cape Town Highlanders Regiment were often deployed for ceremonial events. Following the abolition of apartheid in South Africa, the guard was disestablished, leaving the defence forces without an official guard of honour until 1995, when the NCG was founded.

==== Zimbabwe ====
The Presidential Guard is an elite combat unit of the Zimbabwe National Army, serving as a Household Division-like service for the President of Zimbabwe. The unit, in their green service uniform and yellow berets, mount the guard of honour on behalf of the Zimbabwe Defence Forces. Past events where the guard of honour was provided by the presidential guard includes Defence Forces Day festivities, Heroes Day, the Independence Day Parade, and the inauguration of Emmerson Mnangagwa.

The flag of the Presidential Guard of Zimbabwe consists of a beige background, with three equal horizontal stripes of red, green and red, and the centre having a shield which contains a white wreath beneath a bird, over which are two brown rifles in saltire. The brigade is based currently at Dzivarasekwa Barracks in Harare and is led by Brigadier Anselem Sanyatwe.

=== Americas ===
==== Argentina ====
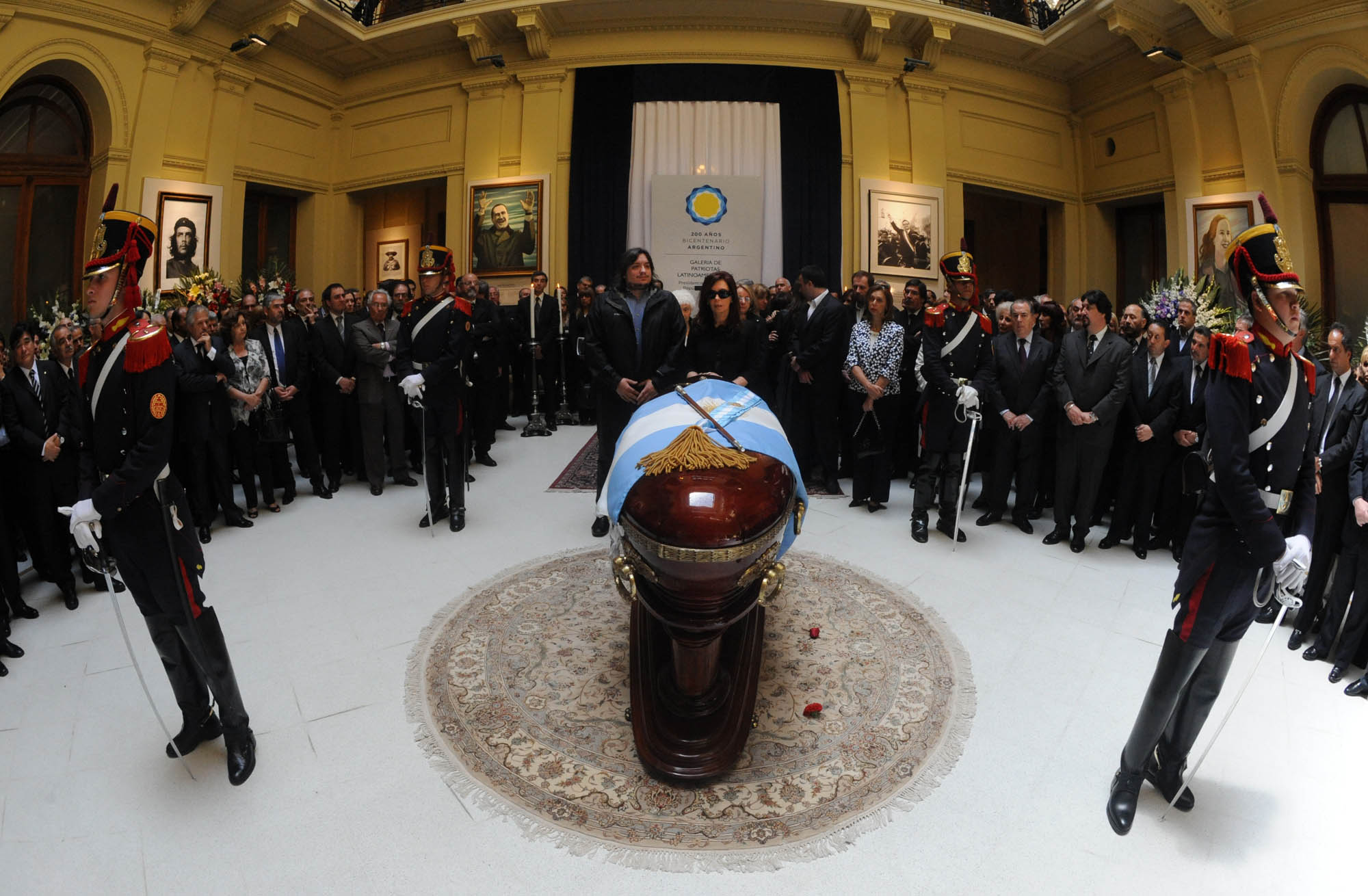
A guard of honour formed by Argentine Mounted Grenadiers Regiment around the remains of former Argentine president Néstor Kirchner during his state funeral. 2010

The Regiment of Mounted Grenadiers serves as a part of the Argentine Army, serving as the presidential guard and ceremonial mounted detachments. Two unmounted grenadiers are stationed in front of the Pink House as a symbol of the ceremonial and honour guard. They also provide security to the Buenos Aires Metropolitan Cathedral, where its founder's remains are buried, and at the Palace of the Argentine National Congress, as well as in the other presidential residences. Raised in 1813, it is designated as the senior regiment of cavalry in the Army.

==== Brazil ====
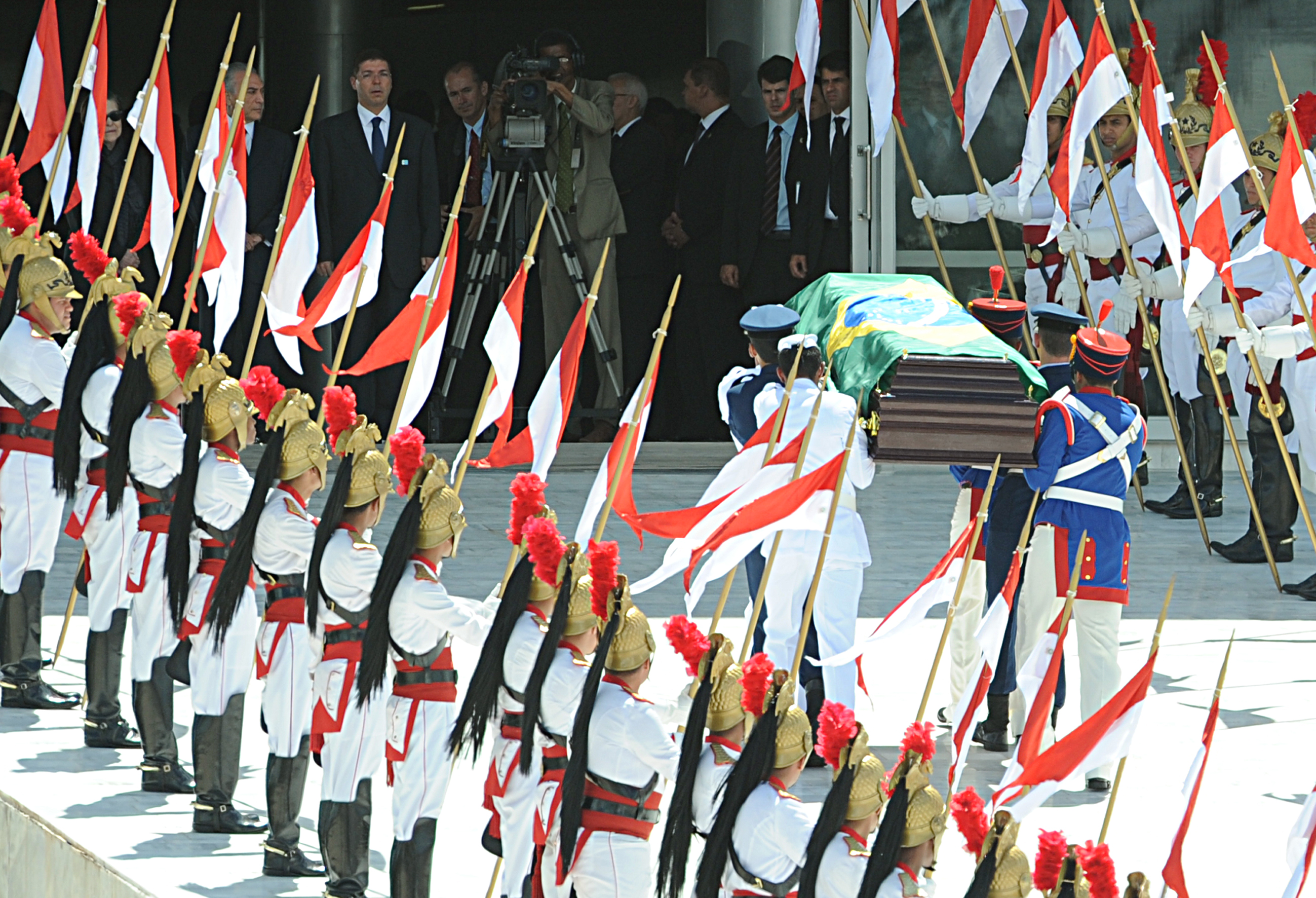
The Independence Dragoons line the ramp of the Palácio do Planalto during the state funeral of the former Vice President of Brazil José Alencar on March 30, 2011

The Brazilian armed forces and Brazilian Military Police have several units designated as guards of honour, which perform public and ceremonial duties on behalf of the Armed Forces and the military police units. The most important of them is the Brazilian president's honour guard units, all of the Brazilian Army. It is composed of the 1st Guards Cavalry Regiment (1o Regimento de Cavalaria de Guardas – RCG, in Portuguese) – "Independence Dragoons", the Presidential Guard Battalion (Batalhão da Guarda Presidencial – BGP, in Portuguese) and the Cayenne Battery. All these units fall under the Planalto Military Command.

The Brasilia Marine Group of the Brazilian Marine Corps, a component of the Brazilian Navy, provides ceremonial guards of honour as well. The Ministry of Defence maintains its own joint service honour guard.

==== Canada ====
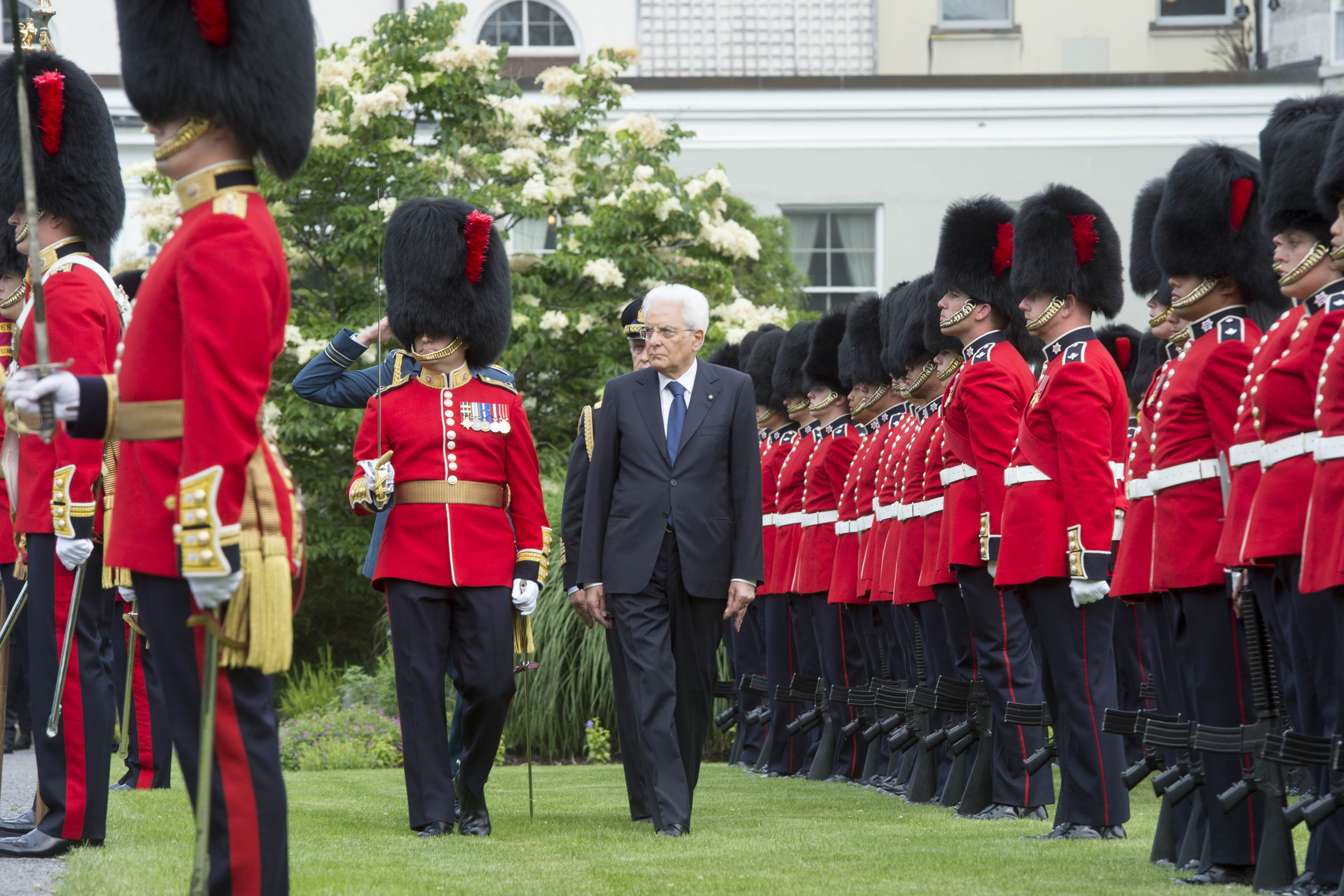
Italian president Sergio Mattarella inspects a guard of honour formed by the Governor General's Foot Guards of the Canadian Army, 2017

Military public duties in Ottawa, Canada's national capital, are formally the responsibility of two regiments of foot guards: the Canadian Grenadier Guards and the Governor General's Foot Guards. One of their main tasks is the provision of sentries at ceremonial and other official state functions organized by the Government of Canada. Their tasks include mounting the guard of honour at military funerals and other events attended by visiting dignitaries. The two regiments of foot guards, together with the Governor General's Horse Guards, based in Toronto, make up Canada's Household Division.

The Canadian Army also operates a summer public duties detachment known as the Ceremonial Guard, which assumes public duties in Ottawa from late-June to late-August. The Ceremonial Guard is made up of regulars or reservists of the Canadian Army, although its membership is also augmented by members regulars and reservists of the Royal Canadian Air Force, and the Royal Canadian Navy. Like the foot guards, the Ceremonial Guards also mount the guard of honour for military funerals, and visiting dignitaries while in season. Members of the Ceremonial Guard wear the uniforms of the Canadian foot guards, as they have historically staffed the summer public duties detachment, before membership in the Ceremonial Guard was opened to the entire Canadian Armed Forces in the 21st century. The Ceremonial Guard is considered an ad hoc detachment, as its members are drawn from various units of the armed forces, and does not constitute a permanent unit in the Canadian Forces' order of battle.

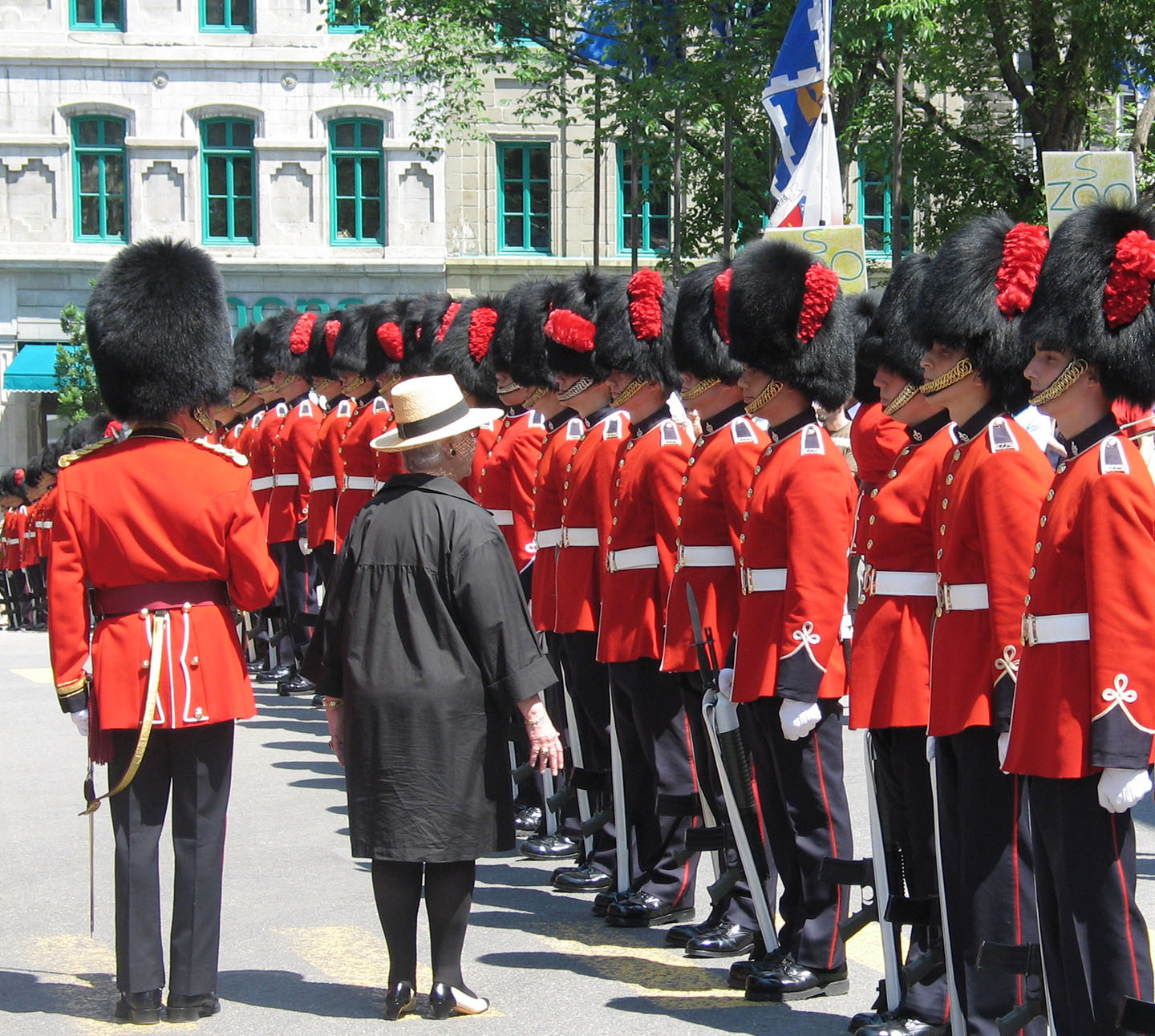
Mayor of Quebec City Andrée Boucher inspects a guard of honour formed by the Canadian Army's Royal 22^{e} Régiment, 2006

Beside the Canadian foot guards and the Ceremonial Guards, units with regularly scheduled guard mountings include the Royal 22nd Regiment, which mounts the guard from late June to Labour Day (the first Monday of September) at the Citadelle of Quebec in Quebec City, a military installation and secondary residence of the King and Governor General. As the unit is based in Quebec City, it rarely mounts the guard of honour for foreign dignitaries.

Guards of honour are also formed by civilian police, and fire services, including the Royal Canadian Mounted Police. These civilian honour guards are typically mounted for funerals, and local ceremonies, with the honour guard units typically made up of 30 to 60 members. Some, like the York Regional Police, operate a mounted honour guard unit. Fire and rescue ceremonial units such as the Toronto Fire Services Honour Guard and the Calgary Firefighters Honour Guard are unique in that they are armed with a ceremonial axe.

==== Colombia ====
The 37th Infantry Presidential Guard Battalion, composed of five companies, a historical company and one artillery battery plus a military band, a fanfare trumpet section and Corps of Drums, is the President of Colombia's honour guard service regiment under the National Army of Colombia. It is stationed at the Casa de Nariño in Bogotá where the changing of the guard ceremony takes place three days per week and carries the traditions of Simon Bolivar's infantry guards company raised in the midst of the Spanish American wars of independence in 1815.

==== Cuba ====
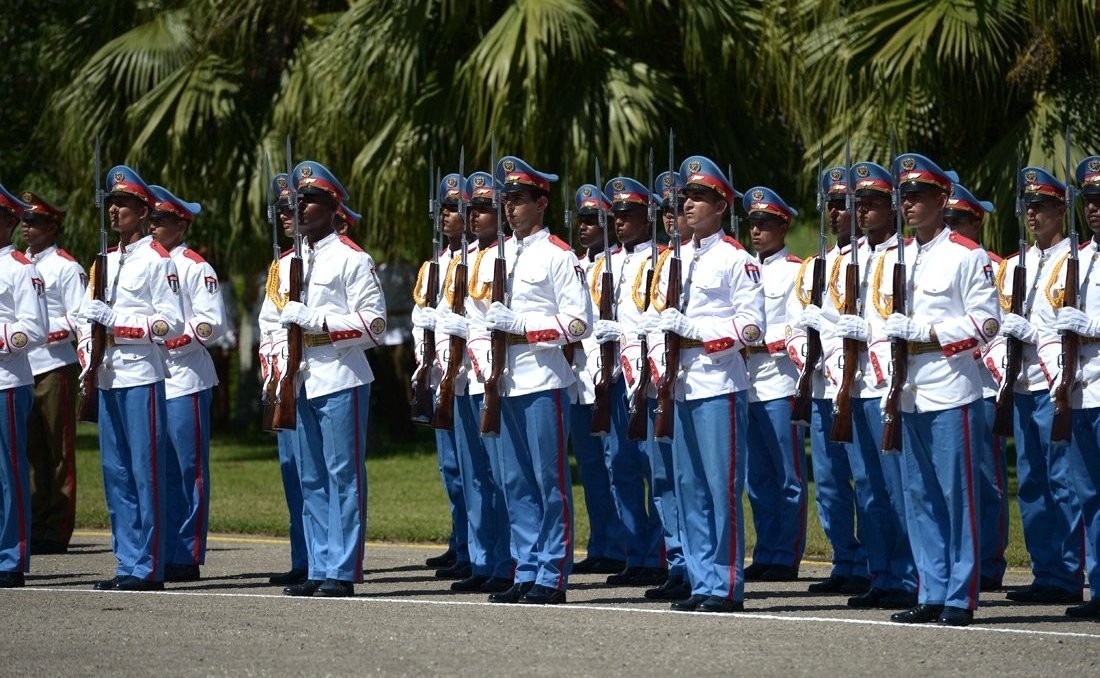
A guard of honour formed by the Cuban Ceremonial Unit presenting arms during the welcoming ceremony for the Russian state visit to Cuba, 2014

The Ceremonial Unit of the Cuban Revolutionary Armed Forces provided honours for the Communist Party of Cuba, the Government of Cuba, and the Cuban Revolutionary Armed Forces. It is a sort of mix between Russian and German ceremonial formations, with the unit notably adopting the German-born goosestep. Its ceremonial duties are usually performed at government buildings and notable areas in Havana, with the Plaza de la Revolución (the main square in the capital) and the Palace of the Revolution (the workplace of the President of Cuba). The main purpose of the military unit is the performance of the changing of the guard every half an hour at the José Marti Mausoleum in Santiago de Cuba. Prior to Fidel Castro's 1959 Cuban Revolution, honour guards were performed by units that resembled honour guard units in the United States, such as The Old Guard.

==== Haiti ====
Haitian honour guard duties are performed by the General Security Unit of the National Palace of the Haitian National Police (L'Unité de Sécurité Générale du Palais National, USGPN) which is a major specialized unit of the PNH. It has, since 1997, mainly ensured security at the Palais National and the security of the President of Haiti. The USGPN works with the Presidential Security Unit (Unité de sécurité présidentielle, USP) to protect the president, as well as intervene when a crime takes place and or assist police officers in their duties, outside of the USGPN's ceremonial ones. Funeral honours, state visits, and military parades are some of the many ceremonies that the USGPN takes in.

==== Jamaica ====
The Jamaica Regiment is primarily responsible for public duties in the capital of Kingston on behalf of the Jamaica Defence Force. The regiment's first battalion usually mounts the guard of honour at national ceremonies, serving as a foot guard to the Governor-General of Jamaica. Members of the regiment also provide sentries at the National Heroes Park.

==== Mexico ====
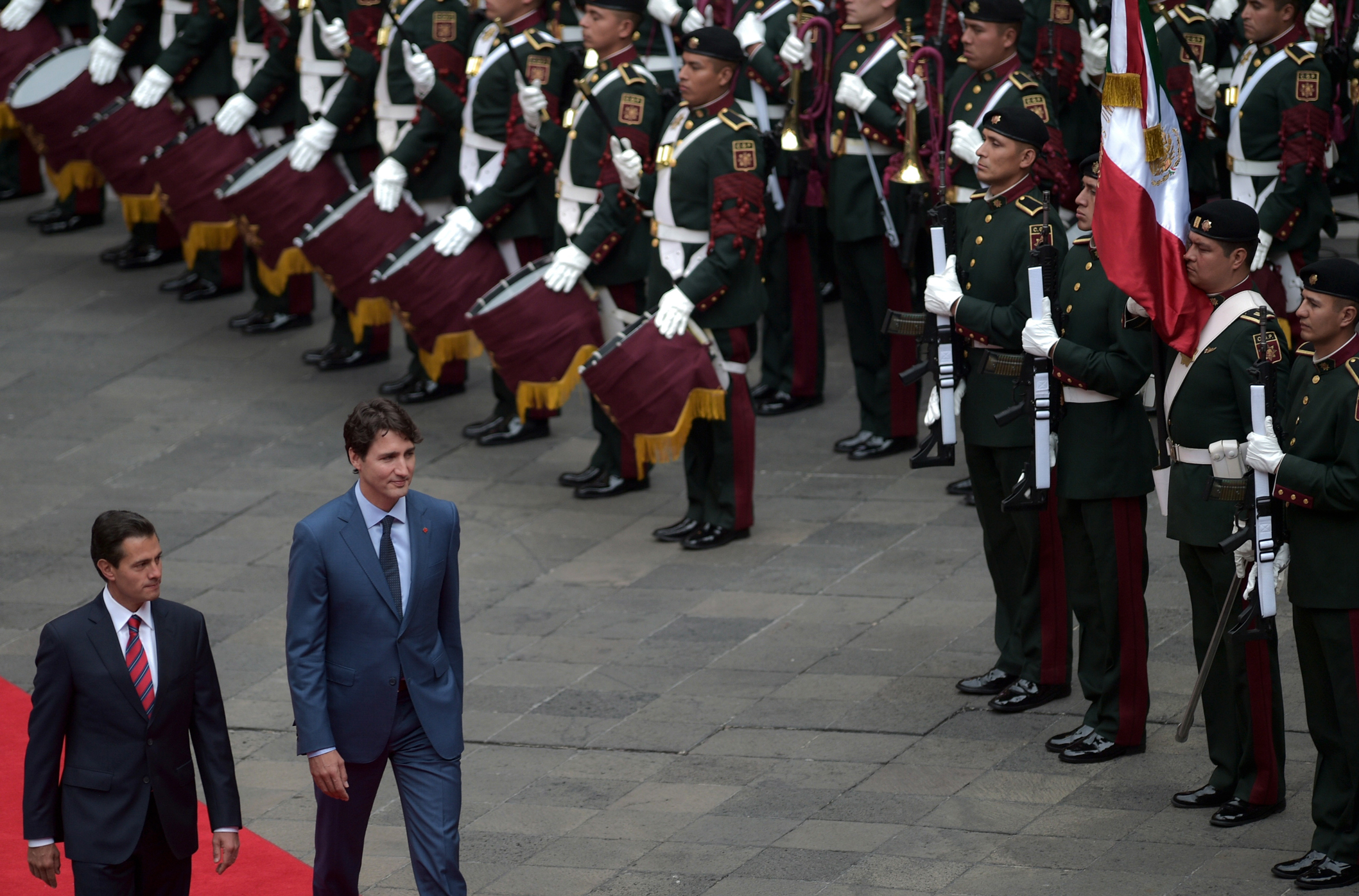
Canadian prime minister Justin Trudeau inspects a Mexican military guard of honour during an official visit to Mexico, 2017

The Honour Guard in Mexico consists of members selected from the Mexican Navy, Mexican Army, Air Force and/or the National Guard, and report to the Secretariats of National Defence, Security and Civil Protection and the Navy, while these three government secretariats maintain currently (since the 2018 disbandment of the Estado Mayor Presidencial), through the Presidential Guards Corps of the National Guard, a dedicated joint service guards corps with a division of presidential military police and selected other formations from these select secretariats. Some of their duties include protection of the Mexican flag in Zocalo, and the raising and lowering of it, as well as providing ceremonial guards at National Palace or Campo Marte during state visits to Mexico.

There are also those selected from other organizations, such as historic societies, schools, sports centers, celebrities, etc., but these are for national holiday events within the country. Escolta de la bandera or Escolta de guerra or Escolta de honores or simply La escolta is the term in Spanish for colour guards and flag parties.

==== Peru ====
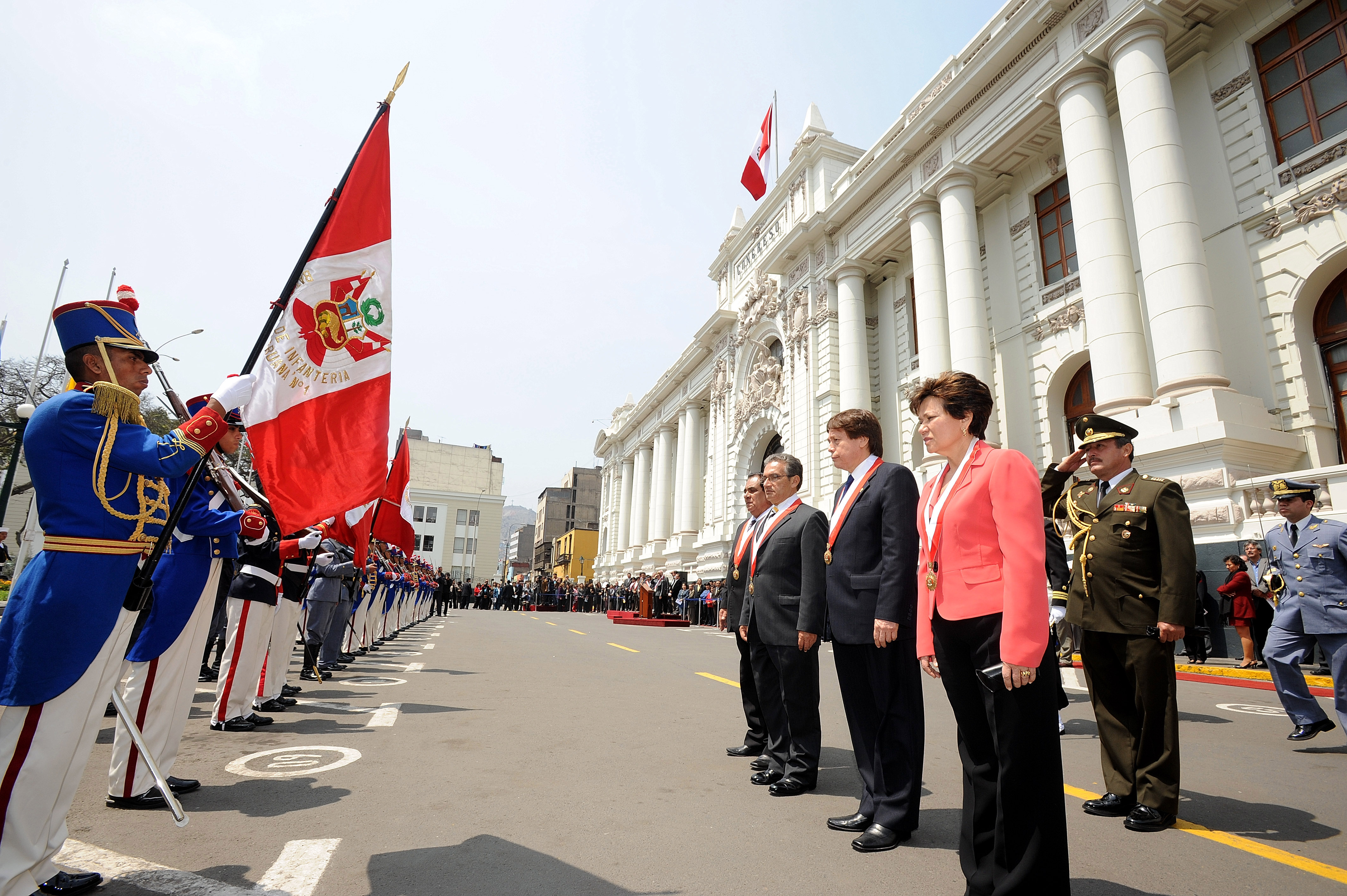
The president of the Peruvian congress César Zumaeta inspect a guard of honour formed by the Hussars of Junín of the Peruvian Army, 2010

The Presidential Life Guard Dragoons Regiment is the premier ceremonial unit of the Peruvian Army having similar practices to the Cavalry Regiment, French Republican Guard. It is one of two official Household Cavalry and Dragoon Guards regiments in the army which have the affording of ceremonial protection to the President of Peru and to the Government Palace in Lima as their foremost duties. Other units, such as the Hussars of Junín and the Peruvian Guard Legion Infantry Battalion, also perform public duties in the capital.

The other services of the Peruvian Armed Forces have their own dedicated ceremonial units. They include the Fanning Marine Company (Compañía de Infantería de Marina Capitán de Navío AP Juan Fanning García) of the Peruvian Navy; and the Airborne Platoon of the 72nd Squadron of the Peruvian Air Force.

==== United States ====
Each uniformed service branch in the U.S. Armed Forces has its own official honour guard: the Army (3rd U.S. Infantry Regiment), Marines (U.S. Marine Corps Ceremonial Guard Company), Navy (U.S. Navy Ceremonial Guard), Air Force (U.S. Air Force Honor Guard), Space Force (U.S. Space Force Honor Guard), and Coast Guard (U.S. Coast Guard Ceremonial Honor Guard). Most state national guard units and state defence forces have a ceremonial guard unit as well. High Frontier Honor Guard is the official United States Air Force ceremonial unit assigned to Peterson Space Force Base in Colorado Springs, Colorado, and acts as the de facto official honor guard unit for the United States Space Force.

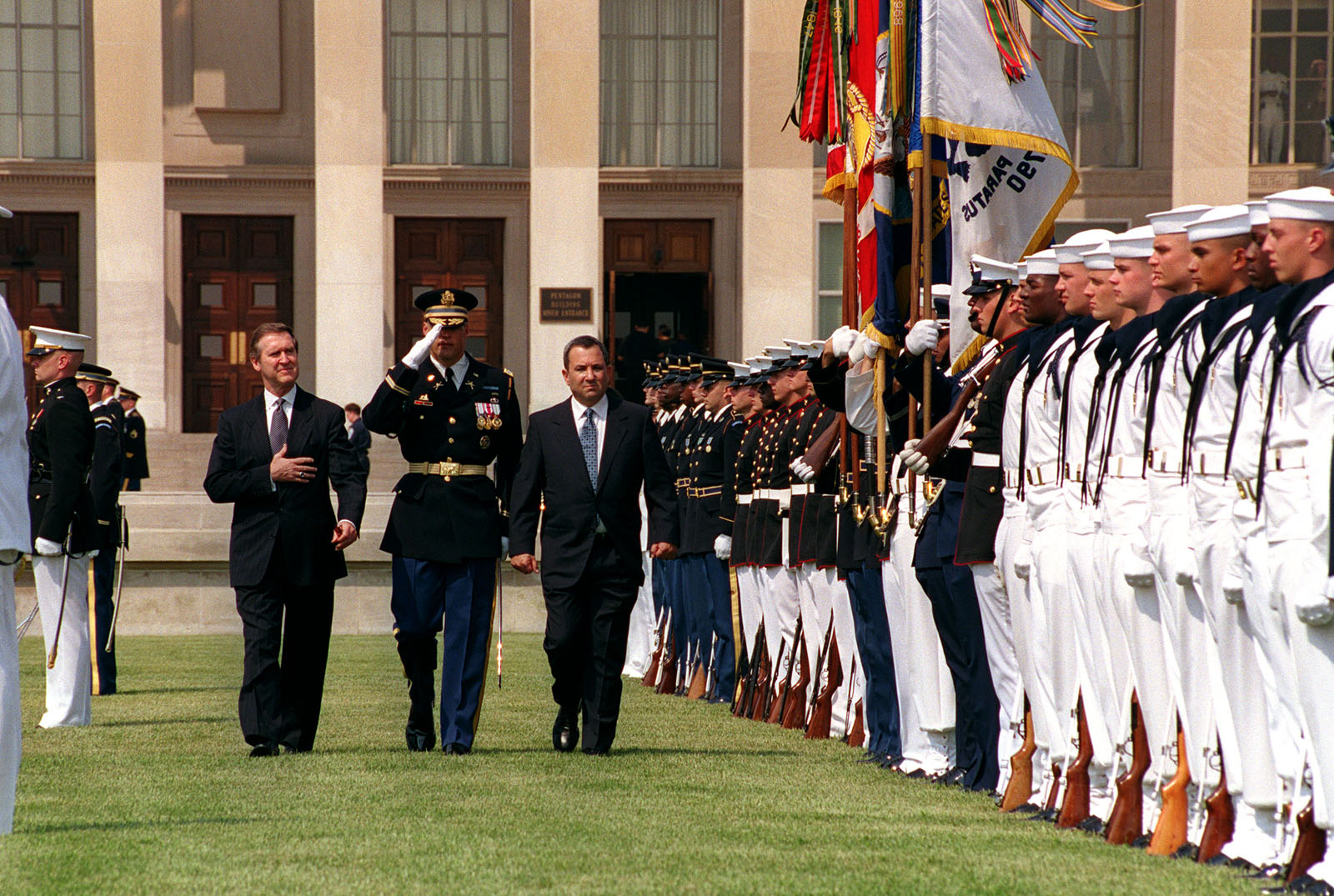
Israeli prime minister Ehud Barak inspects a joint-services guard of honour, made up of personnel from the U.S. air force, army, and navy, 1999

The official honour guard of every branch is located in the National Capital Region, though nearly every military installation will have its own honour guard for local ceremonies and events. The honour guard units in National Capital Region, formed into the Joint Service Honor Guard of the National Capital Region and the Department of Defense, an ad hoc unit of battalion size, represent the military as a whole and the United States as a nation, and perform numerous ceremonies on behalf of the President of the United States, the commander-in-chief of the federal Armed Forces, with musical accompaniment by each of the central bands of the Armed Forces based in the capital.

Since World War II, The 3rd United States Infantry Regiment (The Old Guard) has served as the official Army honour guard and escort to the President, and it also provides security for Washington, D.C., in time of national emergency or civil disturbance. Arlington National Cemetery's Tomb of the Unknowns is guarded by members of the U.S. 3rd Infantry Regiment. Since 2007, a Joint-Service Drill Competition has been held every April in front of the Reflecting Pool of the National Mall. Other ceremonial military units also include the Royal Guards of Hawaii of the Air National Guard and the High Frontier Honor Guard at Peterson Air Force Base. The organized militia for the Connecticut State Militia also maintains a ceremonial guard unit, the Governor's Foot Guard.

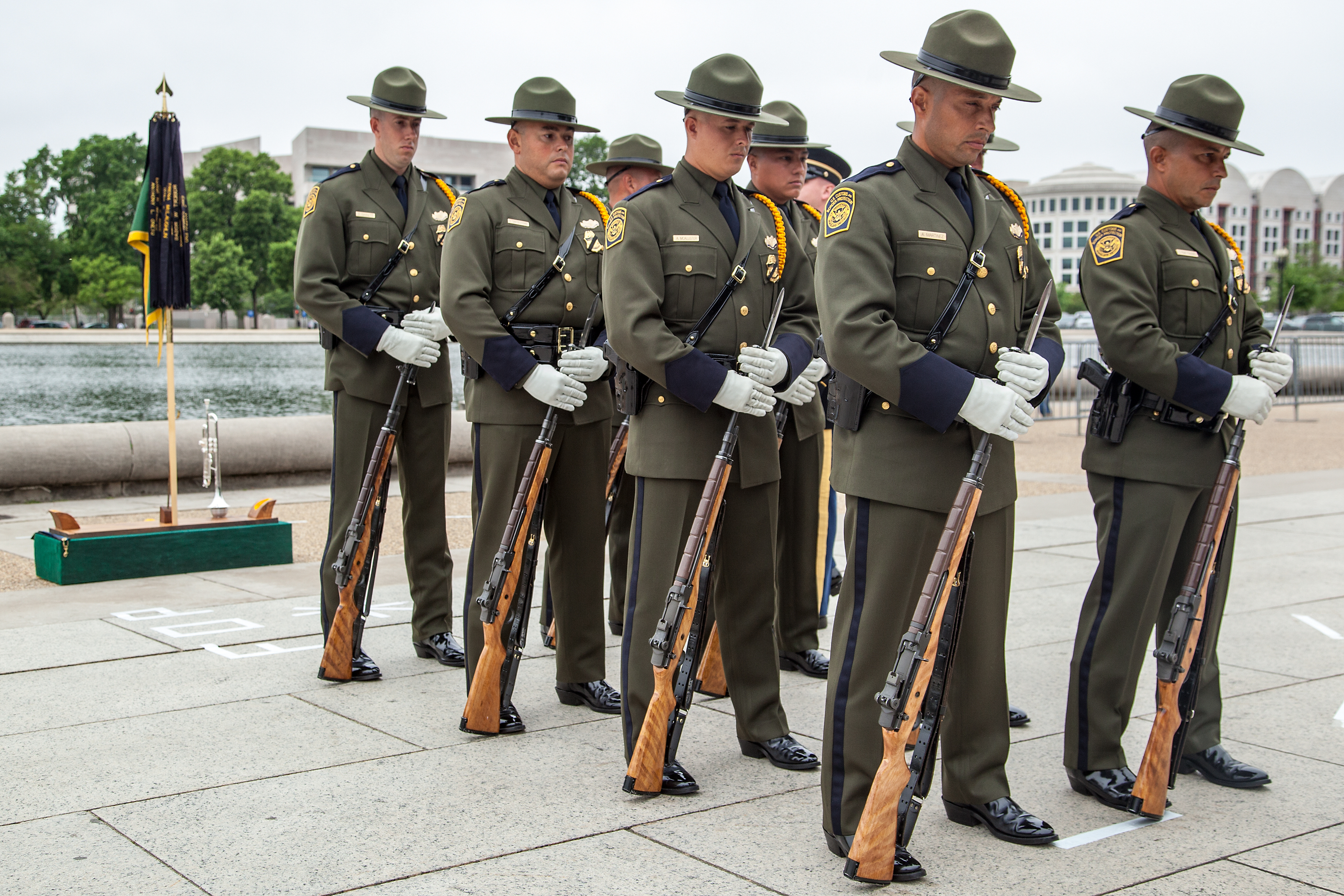
An honour guard from the U.S. Customs and Border Protection service at the Ulysses S. Grant Memorial on Peace Officers Memorial Day in 2013

Many local, state, national and federal public safety agencies in the United States maintain Honour Guards, Pipes & Drums and Buglers, including fire departments, law enforcement agencies, emergency medical services, and search and rescue agencies, who typically use adaptations of military honour guards, and honour those who die in the line of duty (LODD-Line of Duty Death), off-duty but still on the job, and retirees, as well as participating in support of other agencies, and parades. Some Law Enforcement agencies are able to maintain a Rifle Team for 'three volley' salutes. Most, even those within major career paid agencies, are not paid for performing and preparing for the honour guard duty.

==== Venezuela ====
The Presidential Honour Guard is the joint service military unit mandated to ensure the immediate security of the President of Venezuela and his First Family and for the performance of public duties in the most important places in the country. The most distant antecedents of the Presidential Honour Guard go back to the Hussars Troop of Simon Bolivar, of the Venezuelan War of Independence and of the larger Spanish American wars of independence, raised in June 1815 and part of a more bigger guards brigade targeted for the immediate security of the Liberator, and the early 20th century 1st Cavalry Regiment "Ambrosio Plaza" that until the 1950s, albeit reduced to squadron size, provided the ceremonial security of the President and was modeled on the Prussian horse guards units of the late 19th century.

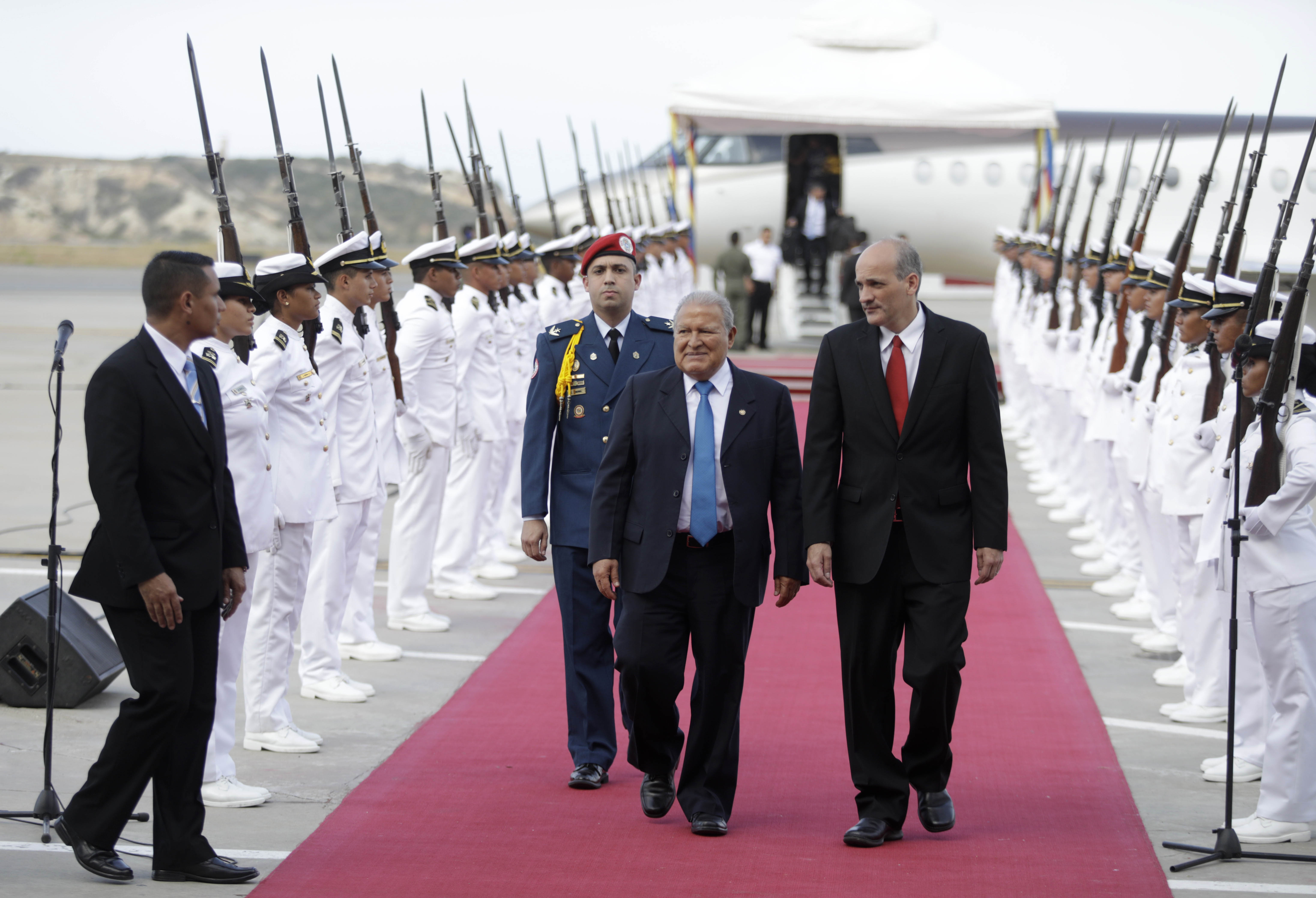
El Salvadorian president Salvador Sánchez Cerén walk through an honour guard cordon formed by members of the Venezuelan military, 2019

The modern brigade serves as a ceremonial escort to the President of Venezuela at Miraflores Palace and attends all state arrival ceremonies conducted there, as well as providing security for the palace complex. The brigade also provides honour guards (i) at the Tomb of the Unknown Soldier at Carabobo Field, Carabobo commemorating the memory of national heroes and the fallen of the Battle of Carabobo of 1821, (ii) at the Montana Barracks in Caracas in memory of the late Hugo Chávez; and (iii) at the National Pantheon in Caracas in memory of Bolívar and other national heroes buried there. The brigade also performs public duties functions as required. Brigade personnel come from all branches of the National Bolivarian Armed Forces of Venezuela (NBAF) and public security services. The brigade is commanded by a general or flag officer and includes a Presidential mounted escort of platoon or troop size, all wear the busby when in full dress.

Aside from the PHGB, there are two other foot guards battalions in the NBAF, the Caracas Foot Guards Battalion of the Ministry of Defence, and the Brigadier Daniel Florence O'Leary Headquarters and HQ Services Foot Guards Battalion of the Venezuelan Army Headquarters. Both foot guard battalions are also tasked with forming guards of honour and public duties. These two battalions wear berets instead of combat helmets when in full dress, when in historical dress the shako is worn.

=== Asia ===
==== Bangladesh ====
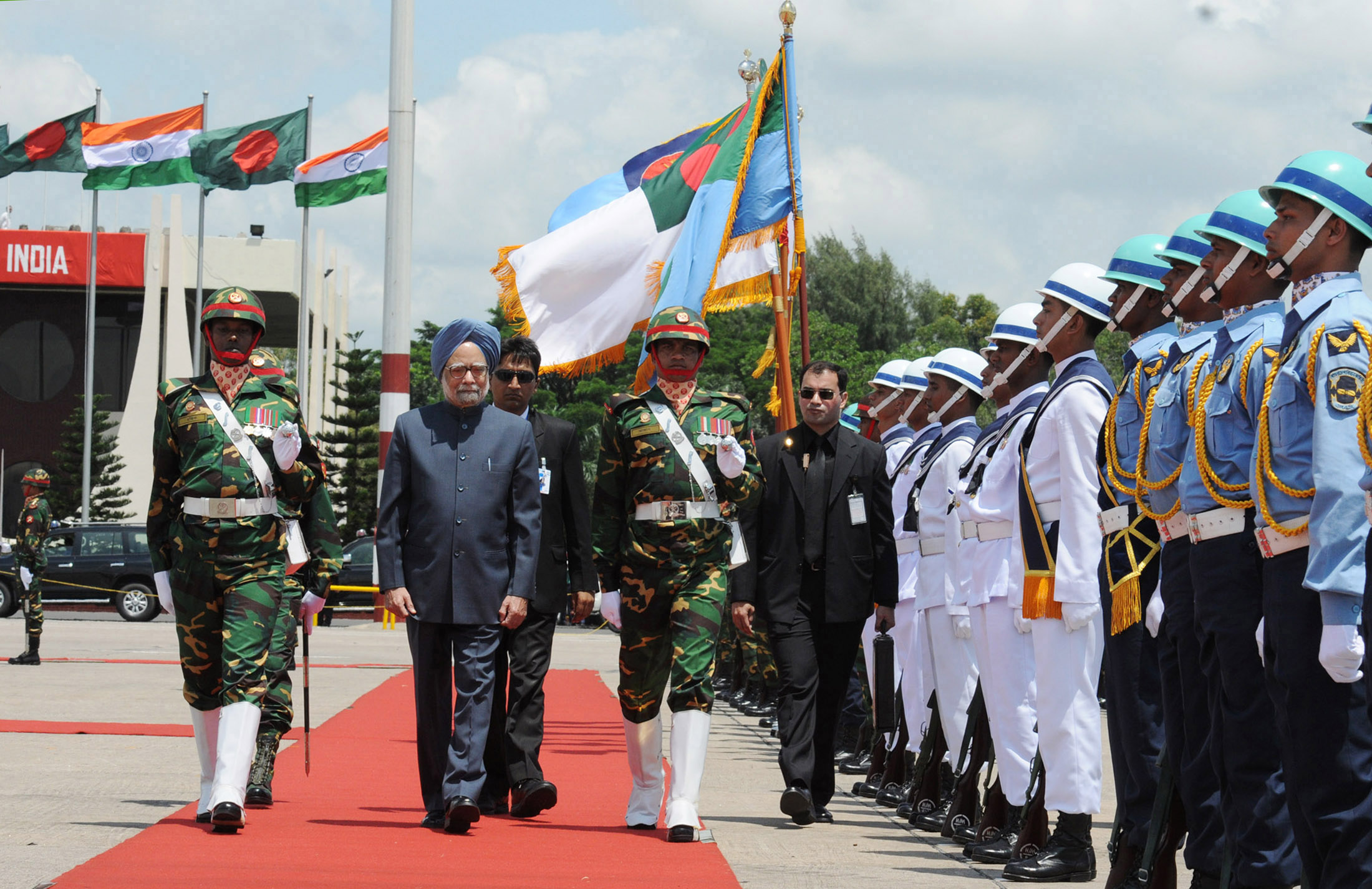
Indian Prime Minister Dr. Manmohan Singh inspecting the Guard of Honour at Hazrat Shahjalal International Airport in Dhaka, 2011

The Guard of Honour in Bangladesh is primarily conducted by the President Guard Regiment, which is a special unit of the Bangladesh Army. This elite unit is responsible for providing ceremonial guards for the President of Bangladesh and other high-level dignitaries.

The PGR also plays a crucial role in the inauguration of new presidents, where they perform ceremonial duties such as the Guard of Honour during the swearing-in ceremonies and other significant state events along with Bangladesh Navy and Bangladesh Air Force.

==== China ====
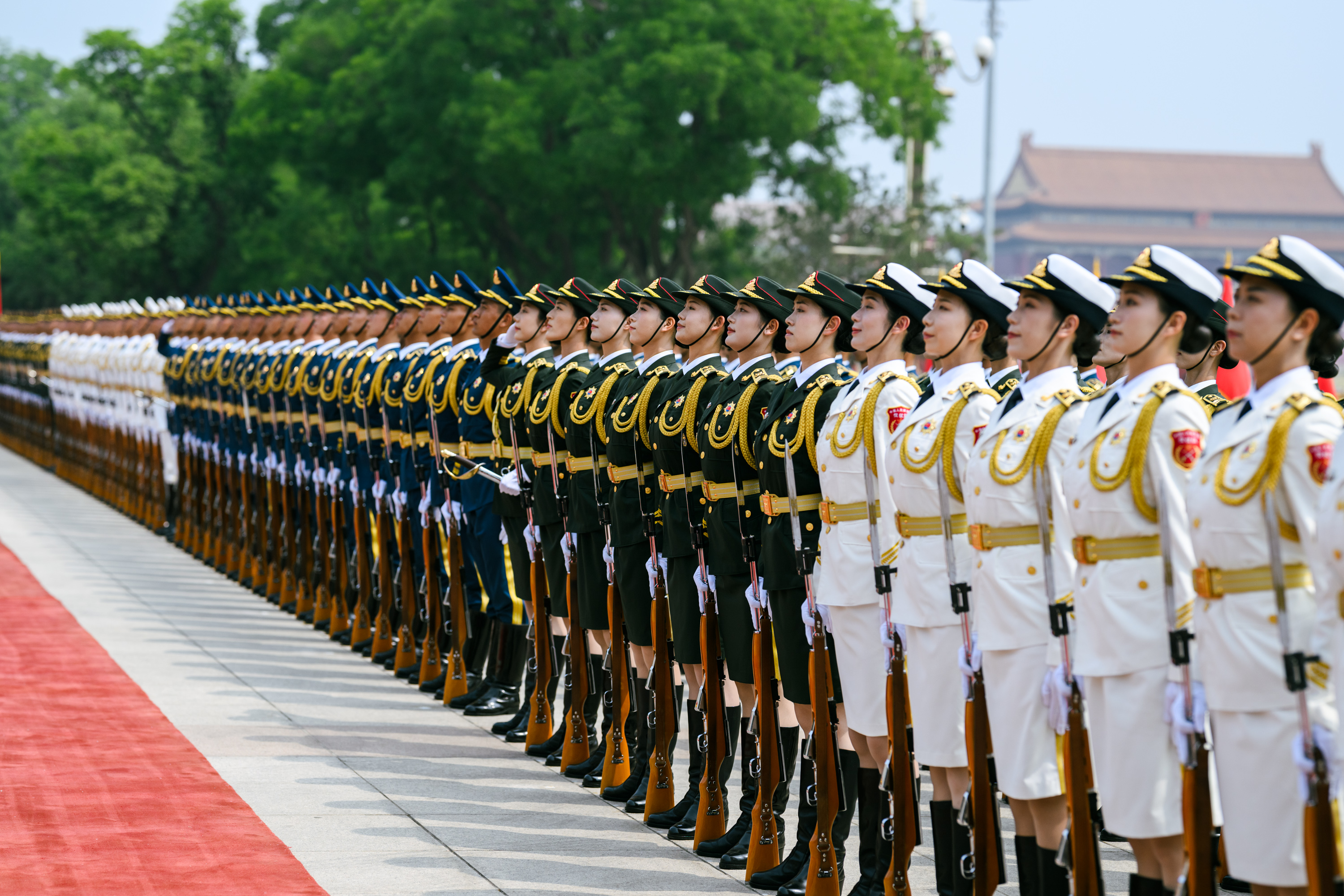
American president Donald Trump inspects the honour guard formed by the Beijing Garrison Honour Guard Battalion, 2026

Today the duties of honour guards are performed by the Combined Honour Guard of the People's Liberation Army (PLA), are provided by the 1st Guard Division of PLA Beijing Garrison in Beijing, under the Central Theater Command and reporting directly to the General Staff. They marched as the first battalion in the military parade of the 35th, 50th, 60th and 70th anniversaries of the People's Republic of China. They are often on parades led by a colour guard detail carrying the PLA flag.

In addition to the Beijing battalion, the PLA also operates a number of other honour guard units that, including in the PLA Navy and the PLA Air Force, as well as the People's Armed Police Honour Guard Battalion in Beijing. Other PLA honour guard units based outside Beijing includes the Hong Kong Garrison Honour Guard Battalion, Macau Garrison Honour Guard Battalion, and the Xinjiang Garrison Honour Guard Battalion

Police-manned honour guards are also deployed within the special administrative regions of Hong Kong and Macau. This is partly due to the Hong Kong Police Force and the Macau Security Force having a largely ceremonial British and Portuguese tradition respectively. In the case of Hong Kong, the honour guards are reminiscent of those belonging to the British Household Division. In December 2016, the HKPF received ceremonial training from instructors from the Army School of Ceremonial at the British Army's Infantry Training Centre. It renders honours to the Chief Executive of Hong Kong and the Chief Justice of the Court of Final Appeal. The only notable example of a police honour guard under the Ministry of Public Security on the mainland is the Yunnan Public Security Force Honour Guard at Hekou Port near the China–Vietnam border, having been covered during a report by New China TV in September 2016.

==== India ====
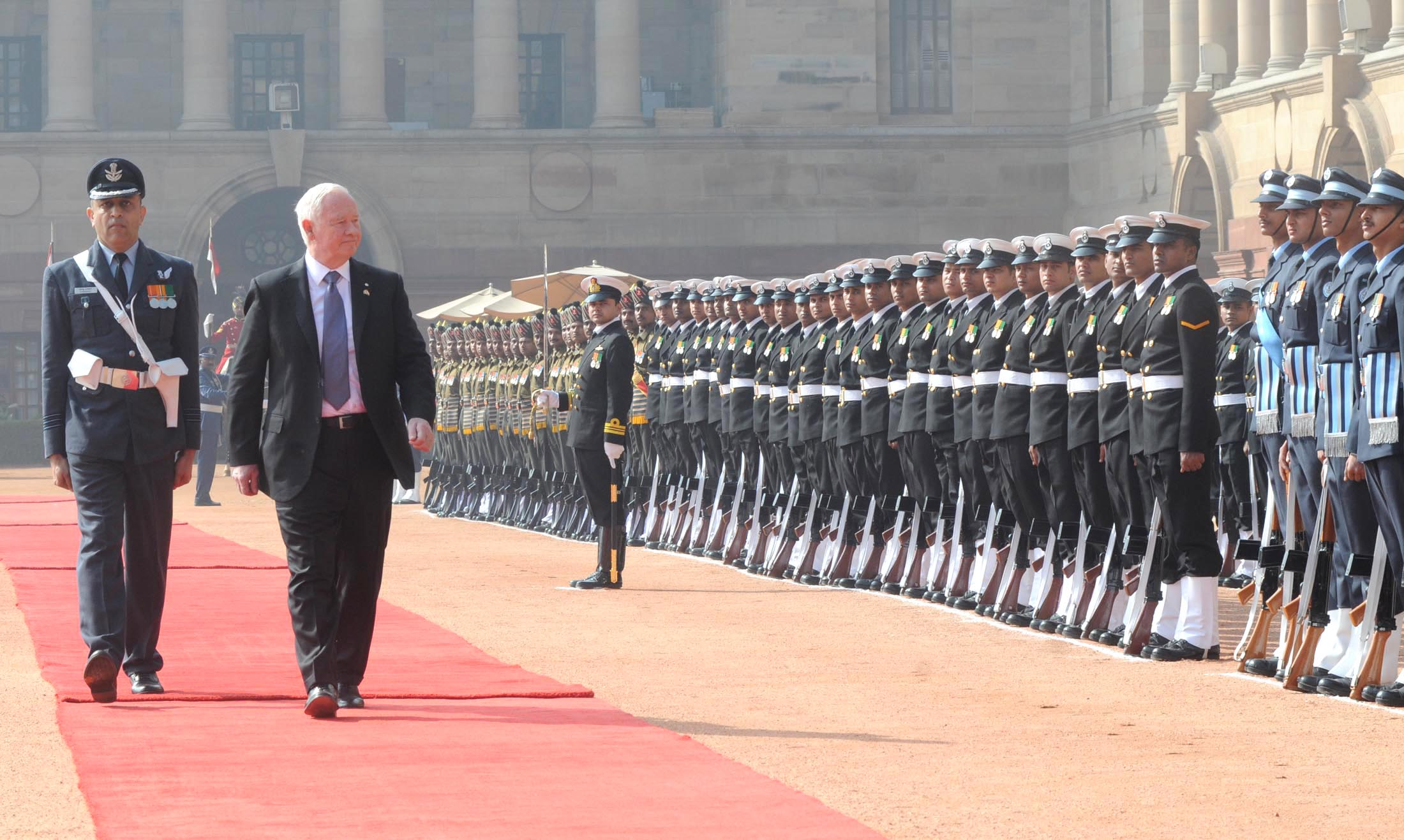
Then-Governor General of Canada David Johnston reviews the guard of honour at Rashtrapati Bhavan during a state visit to India, 24 February 2014

The President's Bodyguard is the seniormost household cavalry unit in the Indian Army, serving as a guard of honour for the President of India.

In India, the Tri-Services Guard of Honour is made up of men or women drawn from three services of the Indian military: the Indian Army, Indian Air Force, and Indian Navy. It is based at New Delhi and is of company size, present only during state visits. In January 2015, during Barack Obama's state visit to India, Wing Commander Pooja Thakur became the first female officer to lead the guard of honour for a foreign leader. In the Indian Air Force, there is only one unit that serves as an exhibition drill team. This unit, known officially as the Air Warrior Drill Team (AWDT), was founded in 2004 and serves as the guard of honour of the IAF.

==== Indonesia ====
The term "guard of honour" in Indonesian is Pasukan Kehormatan which take their modern form in deputized formations of the former Royal Netherlands East Indies Army and the Royal Netherlands Navy.

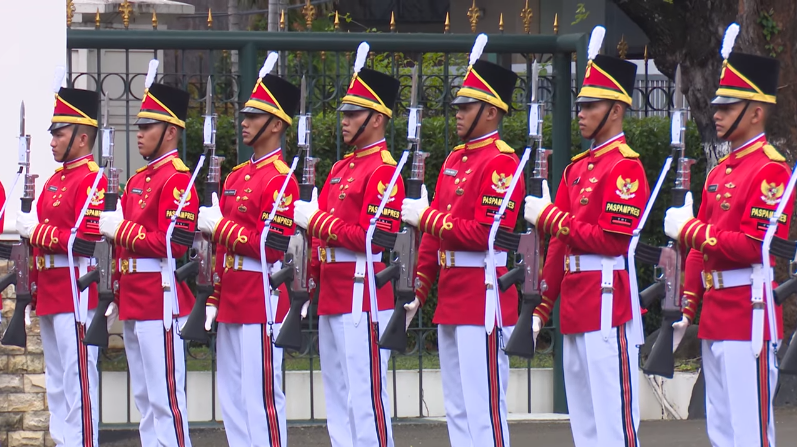
A guard of honour formed by the State Protocol and Escort Battalion of the Presidential Security Force of Indonesia presenting arms, 2017

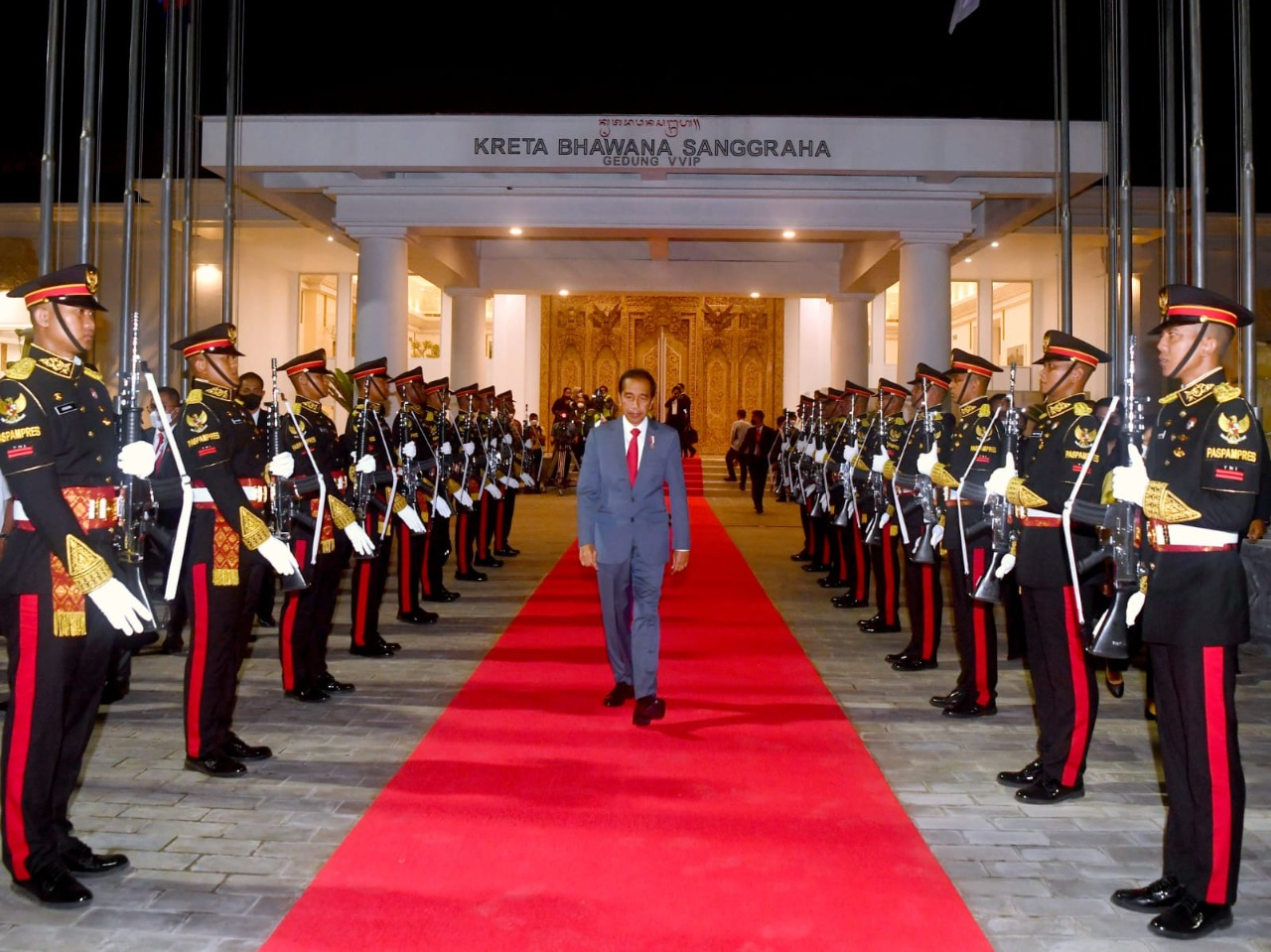
Presidential Security Force Honour Guards with black uniform and peaked cap

In Indonesia, the unit institutionally tasked to act as the Guard of Honour during a state visit is the Presidential Security Force (Paspampres) which takes place at the national palaces (Merdeka Palace or Bogor Palace) with the President of Indonesia and the visiting dignitary present to inspect the guards. The Paspampres is part of the Indonesian National Armed Forces (TNI) tasked with protective security duties for the head of state and state-protocol duties (ceremonial). As a military tri-services special joint service command, the ceremonial duties of Paspampres are to conduct public duties during state function occasions including to provide quarter guard and guard mounting duties for the national official residences.

The ceremonial duties tasked to the Paspampres is the responsibility of a unit within Paspampres known as the "State Protocol Escort Battalion" (Batalyon Pengawal Protokoler Kenegaraan abbreviated "Yonwalprotneg"), it is a detachment consisting of chosen military policemen selected from the Military Police Corps with a minimum height requirement of 180 centimetres (71 in). This detachment is also tasked to become the Cordon Guard during the arrival ceremony at the airport apron during a state visit and is responsible to act as pallbearers during a state funeral. Their uniform are red full dress uniforms with a white buff belt worn on the upper waist, white trousers with white parade boots and a black shako as the headdress, sometimes a light blue beret is worn for other duties such as during the Changing of the Guard ceremony or a state funeral. A black uniform with peaked cap also present.

During the national ceremony commemorating the independence day of Indonesia conducted at Merdeka Palace on the 17 of August, guards of honour which line-up at the palace yard are part of the armed forces tri-services and police ad hoc Guard of Honour which consists of guardswomen and guardsmen from the Army, Navy, Air Force, and Indonesian National Police. During this occasion, Honour guardsmen from the Yonwalprotneg unit of Paspampres (wearing Red and White full dress uniform with shako) acts as the principal guard of honour accompanying the Paskibraka escorting the flag of Indonesia. The same format is seen in other parts of the country during the independence day commemoration ceremony with the Guards of honour tasked from local territorial military or police units in provinces, cities, and regencies throughout the country with the regional heads as the guest of honour inspecting the ceremony. These regional guards of honour wear the assigned peaked caps or berets of their branch or service arm, as well as the shako.

==== Iran ====
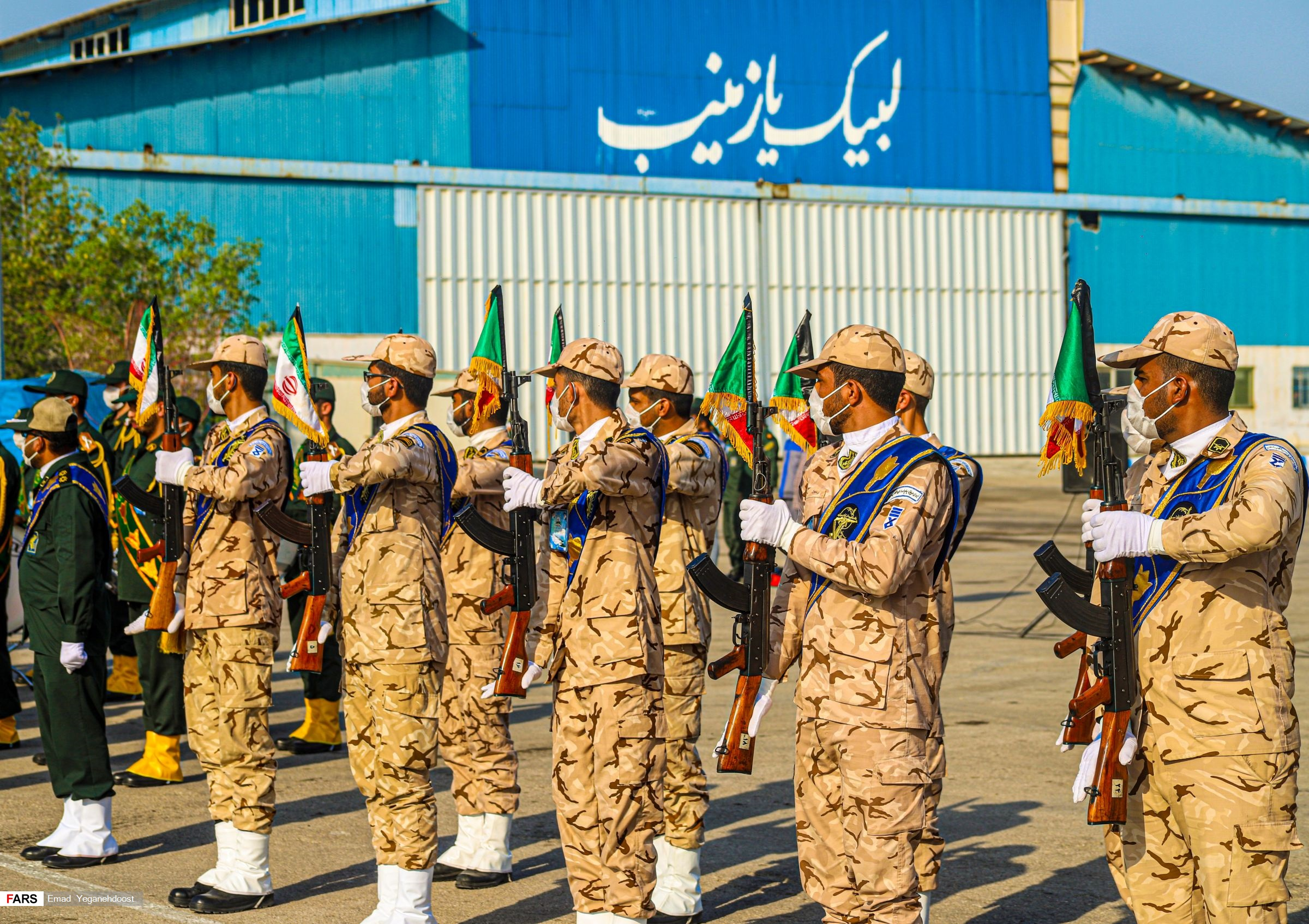
Honour guards from the Islamic Revolutionary Guard Corps presenting arms during a ship commissioning ceremony, 2020

The Central Provost of Islamic Republic of Iran Army maintains a guard of honour unit called the "Presidential Ceremony Guard". It provides honour guards for the Iranian President and during events of state such as arrival ceremonies for foreign leaders and national holidays. Also known as DEJAJA, the unit is composed of infantrymen, sailors, and airmen, all of which serve under the command of the army provost. Aside from public duties, the provost also serves as a military police unit for the capital of Tehran.

Prior to 1979, the Imperial Immortal Guard provided honour guards for official events of state.

==== Iraq ====
The Iraqi Armed Forces maintains a guard of honour made up of personnel from each branch of the armed forces. The unit provides guards of honour for foreign dignitaries at the Iraqi Ministry of Defence. Prior to 2003, the personnel of the guard of honour were selected from the Republican Guard.

==== Japan ====
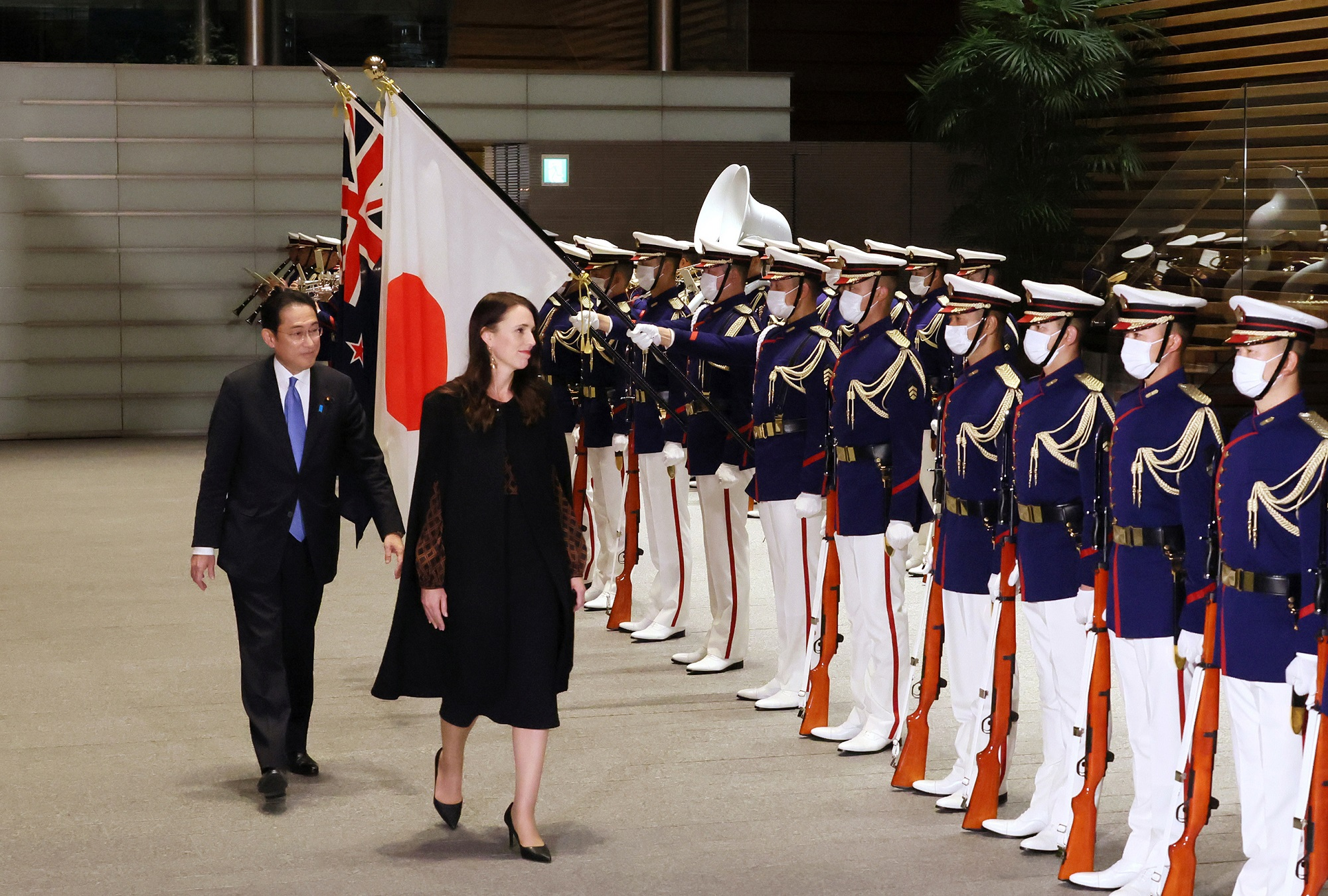
New Zealand prime minister Jacinda Ardern inspects the Special Ceremonial Detachment of Japan's 302nd Military Police Company, 2022

The 302nd Military Police Company is a JGSDF unit under the direct control of the Eastern Army located in the Ichigaya garrison (MOD HQ). When foreign leaders make state visit to Tokyo, a Special Ceremonial Detachment of the company is assembled outside the Chōwaden Reception Hall at the Tokyo Imperial Palace or the Prime Minister's Official Residence to take part in the welcoming ceremony. The 115-strong personnel company is organized into three platoons, each consisting of three honour guard squads. In wartime situations, the company serves as a military police unit.

The Imperial Guard of Japan performs regular public duties at the Tokyo Imperial Palace by performing sentry duty at the gates outside of the palace, which is the seniormost residence of the Emperor of Japan. The Imperial Guard also maintains a platoon-sized mounted police unit for use at state ceremonies. A guard of honour is also sported by the National Defense Academy of Japan.

==== Kazakhstan ====
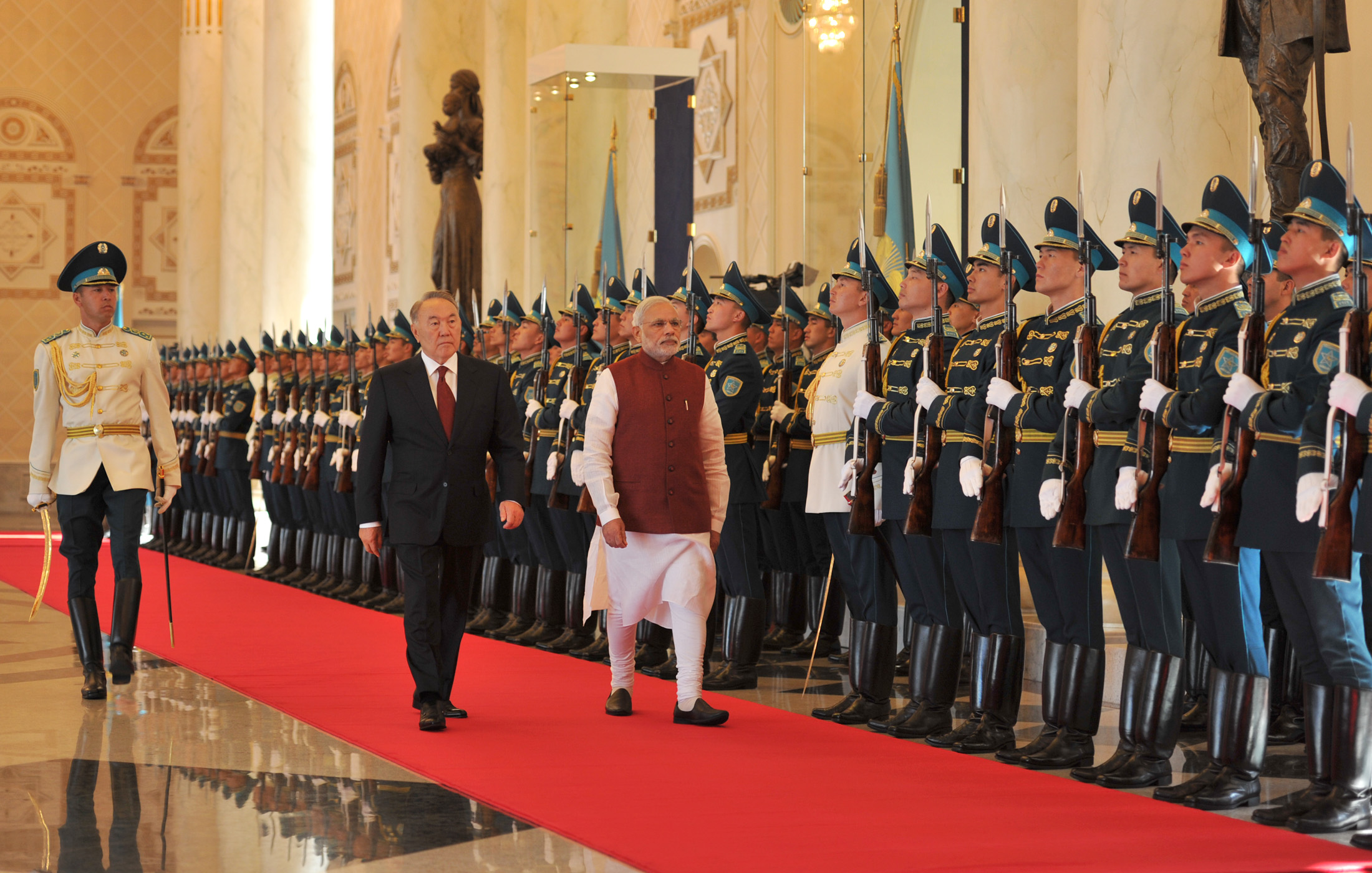
Indian prime minister Narendra Modi inspects the Kazakh Honour Guard Company during an Indian state visit to Kazakhstan, 2015

The Aibyn Presidential Regiment serves as the premier ceremonial unit of the President of Kazakhstan. It is under the direct command of the State Security Service of Kazakhstan and plays a direct role in maintaining state protocol. They have taken part in the changing of the guard ceremony in the Ak Orda Presidential Palace since 2001. On the other hand, the Honour Guard Company of the Ministry of Defence of Kazakhstan serves high-ranking members of the Ministry of Defence. It is composed of soldiers from the Kazakh Ground Forces, the Kazakh Navy, and the Kazakh Air Force, being truly representative of the Armed Forces of Kazakhstan. Like its name implies, it is subordinate to the country's defence ministry and is a reporting unit of the 36th Air Assault Brigade of the Kazakh Airmobile Forces. Both units take part in all essential national events and ceremonies, with a notable appearance being, among other things, the Inauguration of the President of Kazakhstan. The National Guard of Kazakhstan also maintains an honour unit which was formed in 2015.

==== Kyrgyzstan ====
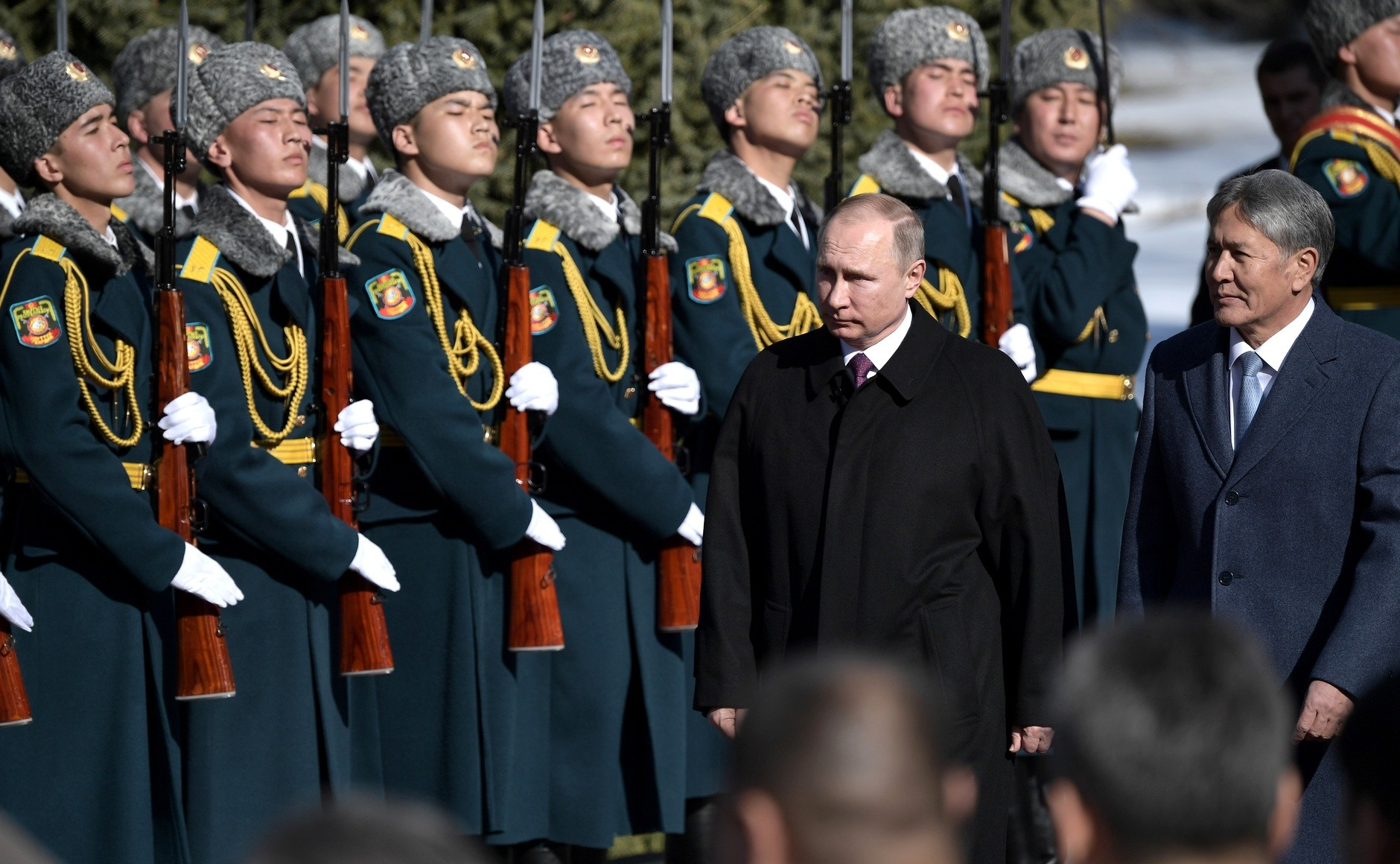
Russian president Vladimir Putin inspects a guard of honour formed by the Kyrgyzstan National Guard, 2017

The National Guard of Kyrgyzstan carries out official representative functions on behalf of the Armed Forces of the Kyrgyz Republic. The guard of honour is formed from the 701st Military Unit of the National Guard. The National Guard stands at attention at the National Flagpole on Ala-Too Square in Bishkek, and has been performing the changing of the guard ceremony every hour since 16 August 1998.

==== Malaysia ====
The guard of honour in Malaysia usually consists of the 1st Battalion, Royal Malay Regiment, which performs most ceremonial duties in Malaysia, such as Heroes' Day, visitation of diplomats and state leaders, National Day, guard duties at the Royal Palace of Malaysia, and many more, in the national level. The Royal Malay Regiment also mounts the guard during state visits to the Ministry of Defence.

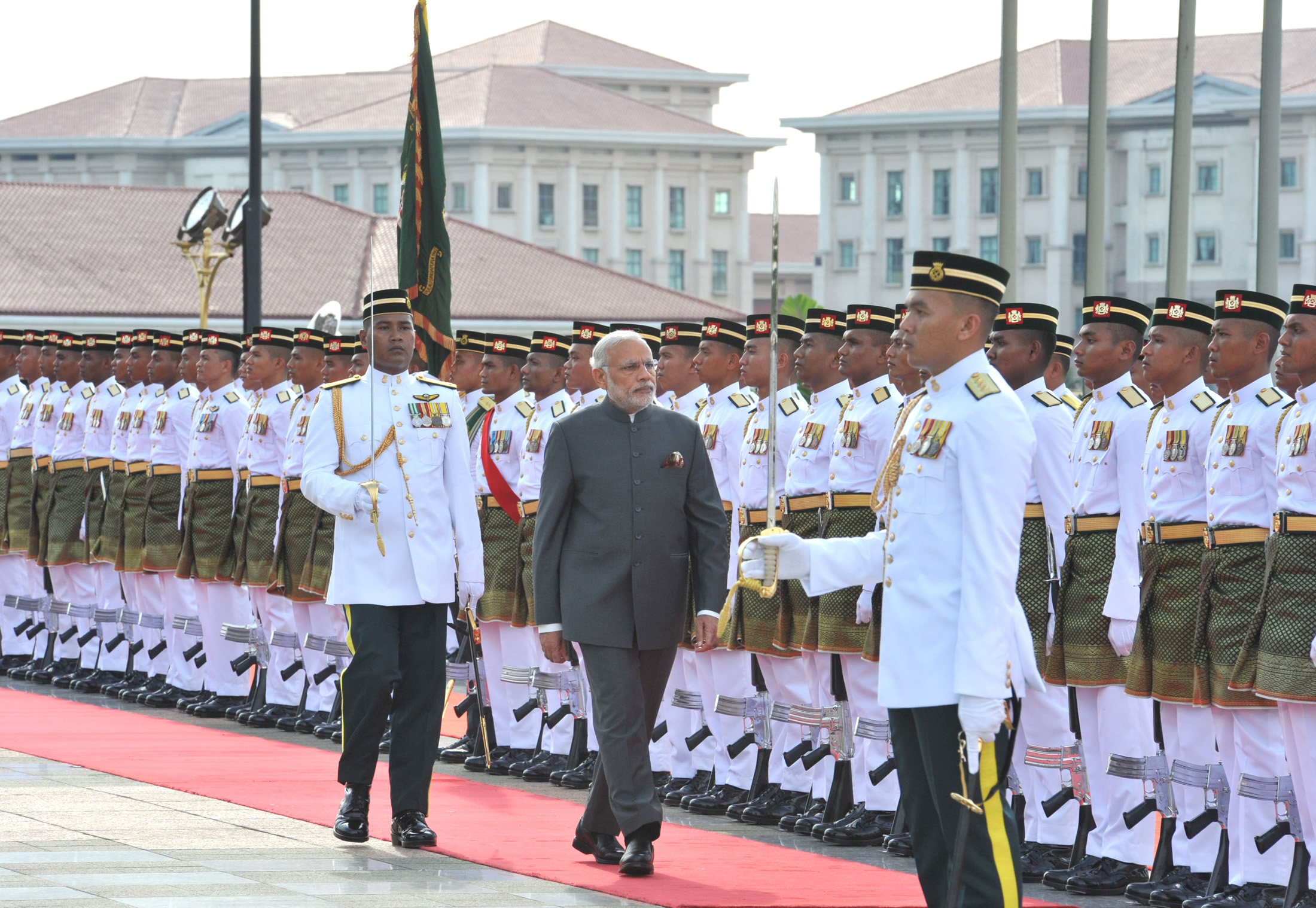
Indian Prime Minister Modi inspects a guard of honour formed by the Royal Malay Regiment during an Indian state visit to Malaysia, 2015

A guard of honour company from each of the battalions of the RMR is also mounted for state-level ceremonies in Kedah, Perak, Selangor and Pahang, as well as in the states of Penang, Malacca, Sarawak and Sabah. Units that have mounted the guard in these types of ceremonies include the Royal Ranger Regiment (based in Perlis), the Royal Armoured Corps (based in Terengganu), the Royal Artillery Regiment (based in Kelantan), the Royal Regiment of Engineers (based in Perak), and the Royal Signals Regiment (based in Negeri Sembilan). The Royal Johor Military Force, an independent state-level military force for Johor, also provides a guard of honour for state ceremonies within Johor.

Units of the Royal Malaysia Police in Melaka, Penang, Sabah and Sarawak, as well as the Royal Malay Regiment and the Royal Rangers, mount guards of honour of the governors of these states. Guard of honour units are also found in the Royal Malaysia Police, The People's Volunteer Corps, the Fire and Rescue Department, and the Malaysia Civil Defence Force.

Honour guards units of the Royal Malaysian Navy (RMN Honour Guard Battalion, Lumut) and the Royal Malaysian Air Force (RMAF Honour Guard Battalion or the RMAF College) are mounted in the presence of the Sultan of Selangor and the Sultan of Pahang, respectively, in events where each of the two service branches are involved. Visits to the MoD building by naval and air general and flag officers are also accompanied by the guard of honour units of these services.

==== Nepal ====
In Nepal, the Guard of honour is formed from special troops from Nepalese Army. It is mainly given to the President of Nepal and the Prime Minister of Nepal. Foreign Heads of State also receives the Guard of Honour. Formerly, Guard of honour was given in Tribhuvan International Airport premises but since 2018, Government of Nepal changed the venue to Tundikhel. The first foreign state head to receive the Guard of honour at Tundikhel was Pakistan Prime Minister Shahid Khaqan Abbasi during his visits to Nepal in March 2018.

==== North Korea ====
The Guard of Honour of the Korean People's Army falls under the direct command of the North Korean Supreme Guard Command or by its official name Unit 963. It takes part in ceremonies in which the Commander-in-Chief of the Armed Forces of North Korea and/or the Chairman of the Standing Committee of the Supreme People's Assembly are in attendance, most notably during arrival ceremonies at Pyongyang Sunan International Airport for world leaders. It has a very pan-KPA organization, with the colour guards of each service branch being present. Accompanying the colour guard is a lead officer in front, as well as two associate officers marching to the rear. Prior to military parades on Kim Il Sung Square and during visits to the Kumsusan Palace of the Sun, the Supreme Leader inspects a guard of honour company consisting of troops of the KPA Ground Forces, the Air and Anti-Air Force, the Navy, the Special Operations Forces, Strategic Forces and the Worker-Peasant Red Guards formed up. It is also the set-up during state visits, during arrival and departure ceremonies held at the Pyongyang Sunan International Airport runway.

==== Pakistan ====
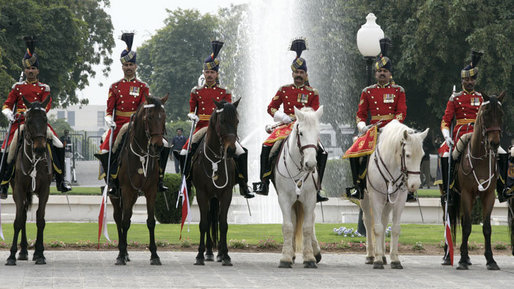
A mounted guard of honour formed by Pakistani cavalrymen during the welcoming ceremony for the U.S. state visit to Pakistan, 2006

In Pakistan, the guard of honour is provided by men drawn from three services of the Pakistan Armed Forces: The Pakistan Army, Pakistan Air Force, and the Pakistan Navy. A tri-service guard of honour company is stationed in Islamabad, the national capital, for services in state visits and important national holidays. The Guides Cavalry also provide ceremonial duties for events in Islamabad.

==== Philippines ====
As a general rule, guards of honor in the Philippines follow traditions modeled closely to their counterparts in the United States plus hints of the long Spanish influence.

The Presidential Security Command (PSC) provides honor guard services to the President of the Philippines in Malacañang Palace, especially during state visits to the country. The PSC is composed of men and women from the various uniformed organizations of the Philippines: the Armed Forces of the Philippines, the Philippine National Police, the Bureau of Fire Protection, and the Philippine Coast Guard. All wear a dark blue rayadillo full dress uniform with the pith helmet as headdress in ceremonial events.

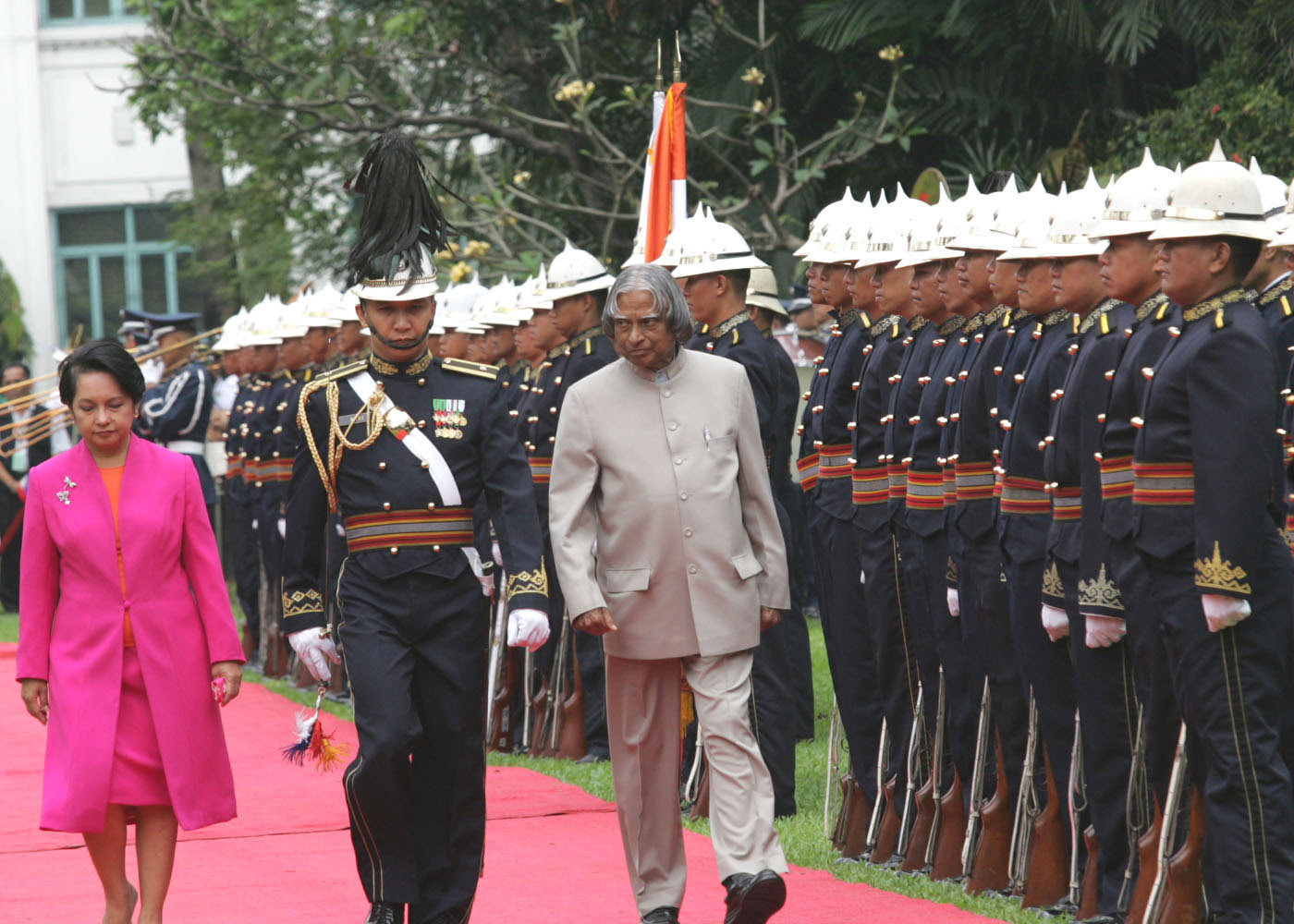
Indian president A. P. J. Abdul Kalam inspects a guard of honor formed by the Philippine Presidential Security Group, 2006

The Armed Forces of the Philippines have five designated honor guard battalions mandated for public duties for events concerning the Armed Forces. They include the army's Security and Escort Battalion, the navy's Headquarters Philippine Navy & Headquarters Support Group and Marine Security and Escort Group, and the Air Force Special Security Group. The armed forces' General Headquarters and Headquarters Service Command also maintains a separate honor guard battalion, the General Headquarters Security & Escort Battalion, which serves as the official honor guard battalion of the Secretary of National Defense.

Honour Guard units are also used within the Philippine National Police and the Philippine Coast Guard. These services typically mount honor guards on important occasions. The National Police guard of honor serves as the official guards of the Secretary of Interior and Local Government, and wear blue uniforms with the pith helmet or the peaked cap, a tradition stemming from the old Spanish Civil Guard. The guard of honor company of the Coast Guard serves similar duties for the Secretary of Transportation and is the only unit wearing English styled sailor caps as part of the ratings' dress uniform while petty officers and above wear the peaked cap. In other cases, the guard of honor wears the side or garrison cap.

==== Singapore ====
Singapore's guard-of-honour units are recruited from members of all four services of the Singapore Armed Forces – the Singapore Army, the Republic of Singapore Navy, the Republic of Singapore Air Force and the Digital and Intelligence Service – as well as the Singapore Police Force and the Singapore Civil Defence Force. They take their position at the forefront of major parades and significant state events, such as the country's National Day on 9 August.

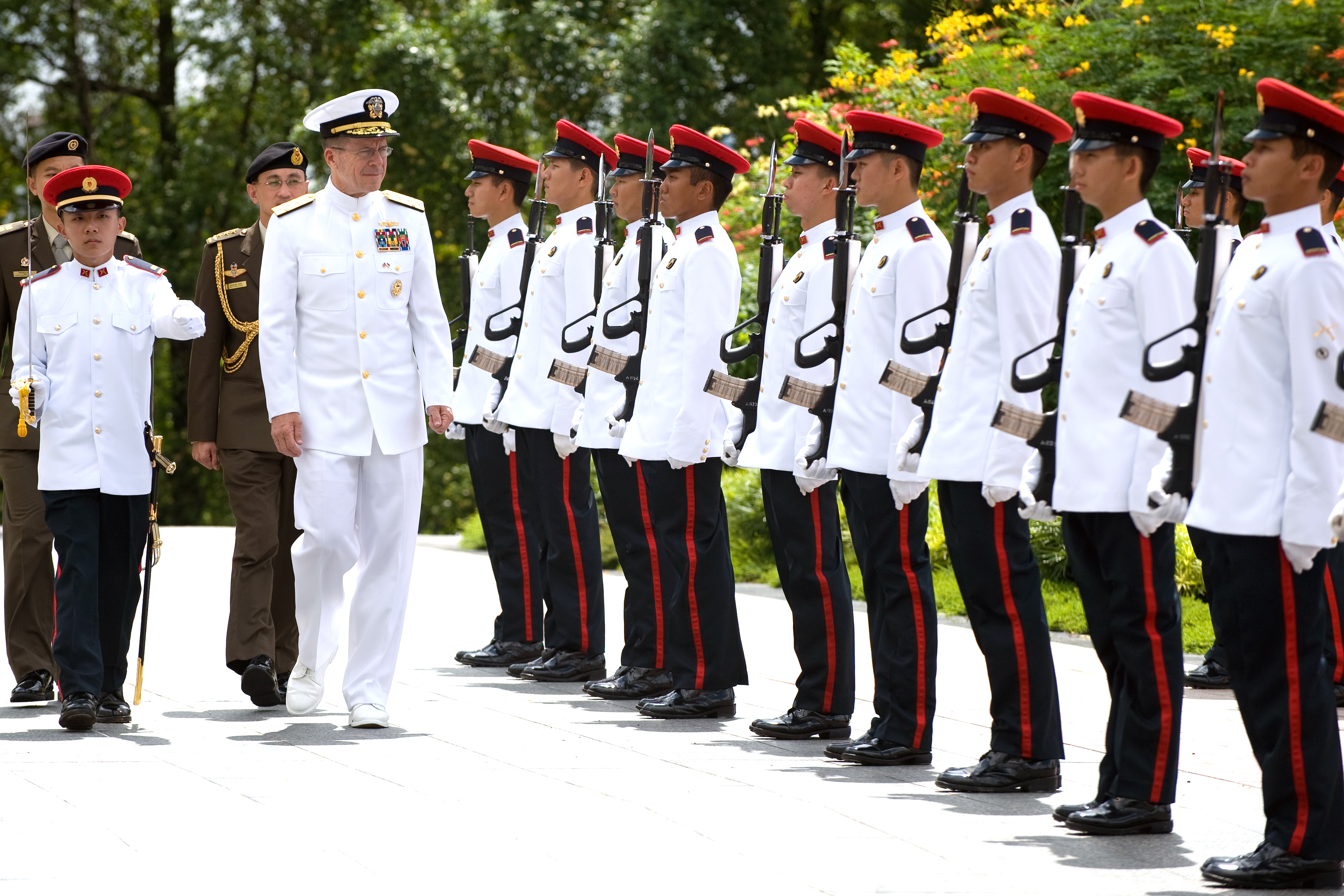
A U.S. Navy admiral inspects Singaporean military honour guards during a welcoming ceremony, 2008

Equipped with the SAR-21 Assault Rifle with bayonets attached for the enlisted and NCO ranks and sabres for officers, all ranks of the guards of honour wear the Ceremonial Uniform (known as the No. 1), which (except in the case of Navy honour guards) have various colours imbued on a thin strip running down the outer-sides of the trousers indicating the unit's service of origin (red for the Army, light-blue for the Air Force, and black for the Police). They also wear distinctive badges, medals, award ribbons, and buttons. These Guard of Honour units will typically be contrasted by at least one contingents of other servicemen attired in their regular uniform (the No. 4 uniform for the SAF units and the No. 3 uniform for the SPF unit).

Guard-of-honour units in attendance at the annual Singapore National Day Parade are the 1st Commando Battalion from the Singapore Army, Naval Diving Unit from the Republic Of Singapore Navy, Air Power Generation Command from the Republic Of Singapore Air Force and the Singapore Police Force Training Command.

For state visits and other important ceremonial duties within the Istana compounds, the guard-of-honour group is formed and mounted by personnel from the Singapore Armed Forces Military Police Command. The MPs also provide the No.1 Guard contingent during the yearly 1 July SAF Day celebrations.

==== South Korea ====
During the Joseon Dynasty, the role of guards of honour taken up by the Sumunjang (Korean: 수문장; Hanja: 守門將, lit. door guards of the palace), who reported directly to the Emperor and the Imperial Family with administrative responsibility to the Minister of Defence as part of the armed forces of the state.

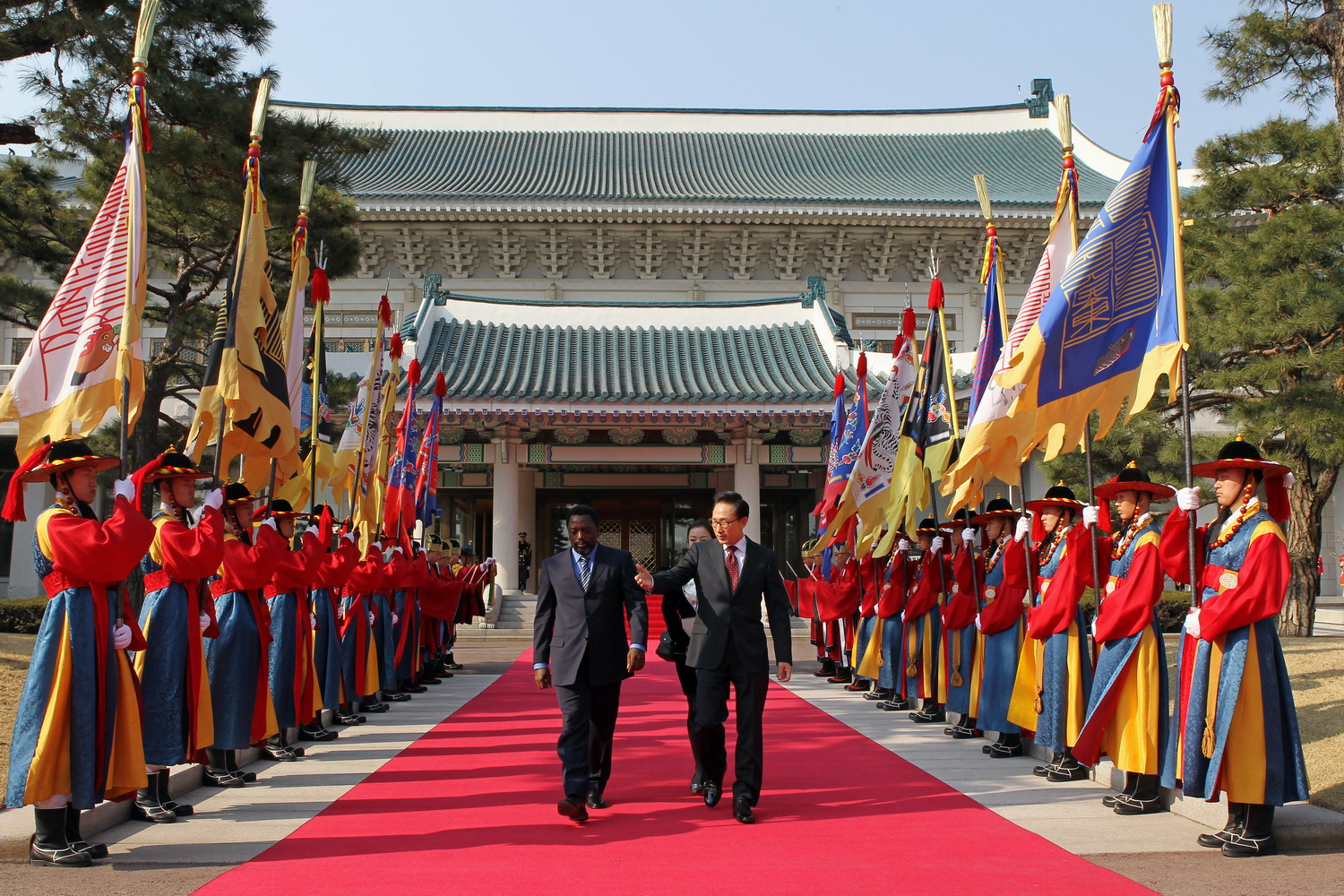
President of the Democratic Republic of Congo Joseph Kabila and South Korean president Lee Myung-bak walk through an honour guard cordon formed by the Traditional Guard Unit of the South Korea 2010

South Korea today operates several guards of honour companies under the Republic of Korea Armed Forces - one each from the Republic of Korea Army, Republic of Korea Navy, Republic of Korea Air Force and Republic of Korea Marine Corps, along with a traditional honour guard unit that is made up of soldiers from the Republic of Korea Army. The traditional guard in particular was founded in 1991 after president Roh Tae-woo reviewed the Old Guard Fife and Drum Corps and the Commander-in-Chief's Guard of the 3rd U.S. Infantry Regiment of the United States. Since then, the traditional honour guards have taken the role of officially welcoming heads of state and other dignitaries. Roles of the honour guards as a whole include funeral honours for the fall, ensuring the security of various military headquarters, and during state visits to the Blue House.

For ceremonial purposes the guards carry various rifles - the Army, Navy and Air Force carry the M16 rifle; the Marine Corps carry M1 Garands and the traditional guards carry ceremonial swords, arrows, spears, and lances, keeping with the traditions of the Korean military and as a tribute to the guards units of the Imperial era. Their colour guards reflect these influences as well. Seamen and junior ratings in the honour guards of the Republic of Korea Navy wear sailor caps bearing "Republic of Korea Navy" in Korean (with Hangul lettering) as part of the dress uniforms, while officers and senior ratings wear peaked caps. While the service guards units maintain their respective military bands based on the US and UK practices, the traditional guard unit also plays Daechwita, a form of traditional Korean military band music played for military ceremonies and events, and as such wears uniforms used by similar ensembles in the 19th century.

The United Nations Command maintains an honour guard that is composed of members of the ROKAF, the US Armed Forces and other partner nations.

==== Sri Lanka ====
In Sri Lanka, the guard of honour is provided by men drawn from three services of the Sri Lankan Armed Forces (The Sri Lanka Army, the Sri Lanka Navy, and the Sri Lanka Air Force). A guard of honour known as the President’s Ceremonial Guard Company is also drawn from the Sri Lanka Corps of Military Police. The Sri Lanka Police Mounted Division serves as a mounted guard of honour for the Sri Lanka Police, regularly performing public duties in providing mounted ceremonial escorts for Heads of state and VIPs, as well as provide guard of honour for the Opening of Parliament and the national day celebrations. During the colonial era, the Lascarins provided the local guards of honour, apart from British Army, British Indian Army, or Ceylon Defence Force personnel. The predecessor to the mounted police division is the Governor's Bodyguard, which served as the household cavalry unit of the Governor of British Ceylon. The Ceylon Mounted Rifles also serves in a mounted guard of honour role. In July 1987, Vijitha Rohana from the naval guard of honour for the visiting Indian Prime Minister attempted an assassination on his life te guard's ceremonial inspection.

==== Taiwan ====
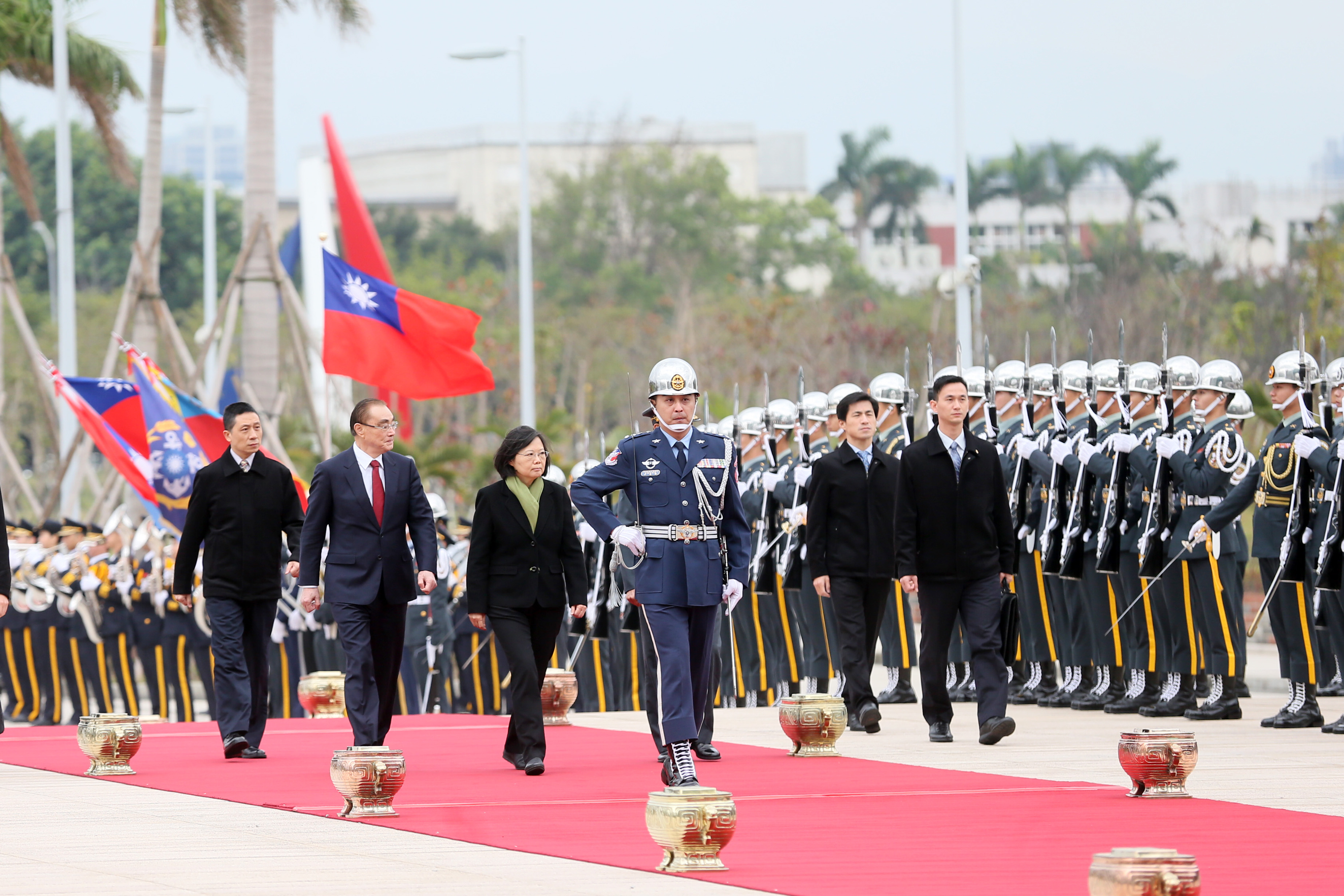
Taiwanese president Tsai Ing-wen inspects a joint-services guard of honour, made up of personnel from the Republic of China army, air force, and navy, 2017

In the Republic of China (known colloquially as Taiwan), the military honour guard duty is provided by members from the following companies representing the branches of the Republic of China Armed Forces:

- Honour Guard Company, Army HQ, Republic of China Army
- Honour Guard Company, Corps HQ Battalion, Republic of China Marine Corps
- Fleet Honour Guard, Republic of China Navy
- Honour Guard Company, ROC Air Force Air Defense Artillery Command, Republic of China Air Force

Each branch maintain their own respective honour guards, all of which follow the American precedent and make up the Armed Forces Honour Guard (中華民國三軍儀隊). The National Day Honour Guard Battalion is also made up of personnel of the honour guards companies of the aforementioned branches.

Guardsmen employ a M1 Garand rifle during ceremonial activities. The units also perform guard duties and are usually present at the Chiang Kai-shek Memorial Hall, Sun Yat-sen Memorial Hall, and the National Revolutionary Martyrs' Shrine in Taipei. Outside Taipei, Taiwanese honour guards are also present at the Cihu Presidential Burial Place, and the Daxi Presidential Burial Place in Taoyuan. Specifically, at the Chiang Kai-shek Memorial Hall, the Honour Guard of the ROC Army performs a changing of the guard ceremony daily with four guardsmen changing duties every hour.

An honour guard battalion, known as the Republic of China Police Honour Guard (中華民國警察儀隊), is also maintained by the Republic of China Police. Founded in 1977, it is currently managed and directed by the Police Department of the Ministry of the Interior.

==== Tajikistan ====
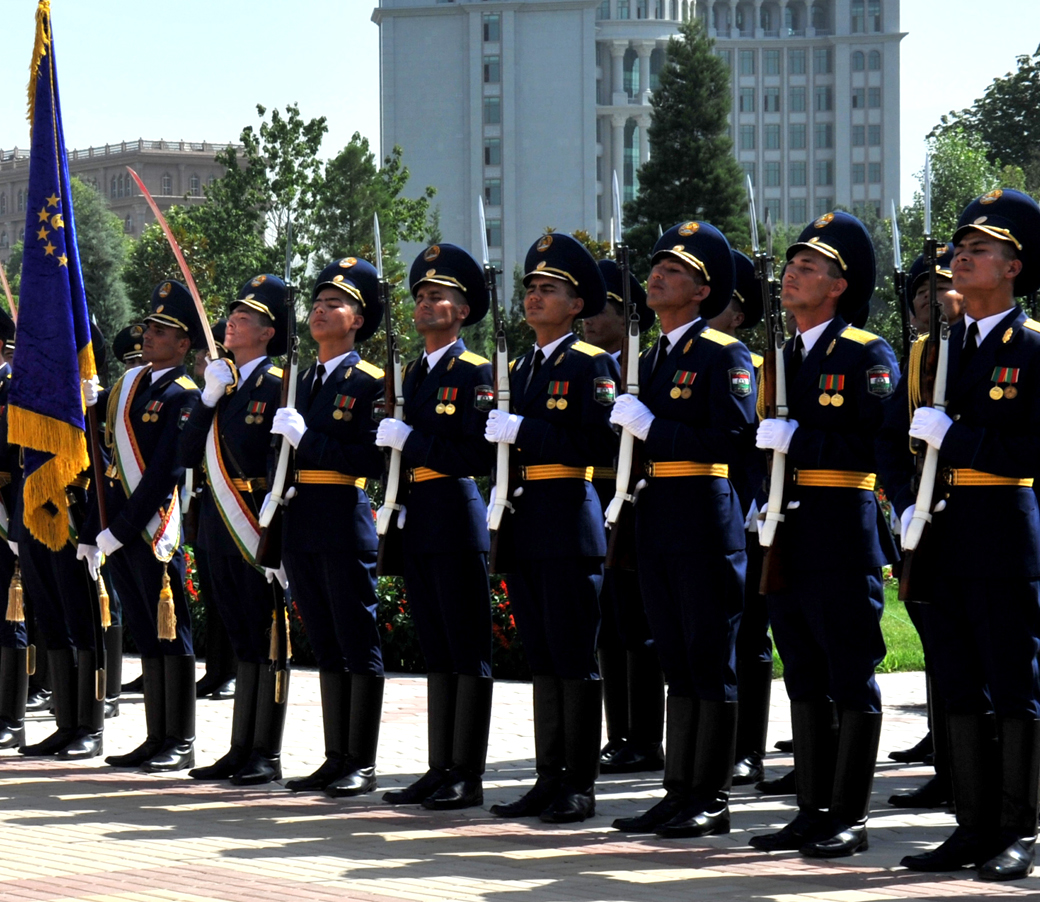
A Tajikistani guard of honour presenting arms during an Indian state visit to Tajikistan, 2015

In Tajikistan, the guard of honour is provided by men drawn from the four services of the Armed Forces of the Republic of Tajikistan: The National Army, Mobile Forces, Air Force, and the Border Troops, all under the command of the Ministry of Defence. Of the many roles of the Honour Guard Company of the Ministry of Defence has, providing ceremonial honours for foreign dignitaries and Tajik government officials at the Kohi Millat and other official buildings is the highest and most important of them all. Like its name implies, it is a direct reporting unit of the Ministry of Defence.

In addition to the military Presidential National Guard also maintains its own honour guard battalion, with its allegiance being primarily to the President of Tajikistan in his/her position as Supreme Commander in Chief of the armed forces.

==== Thailand ====
In Thailand, the honour guard role is taken on by the Infantry Battalion, 11th Military District of the Royal Thai Army whilst the Naval honour guard is taken from the Security Battalion, Bangkok Naval Base, and the Air Force honour guard is taken from the RTAF Security Force Command. These roles were formerly taken by the King's Guard (Thailand) of the Royal Security Command

The ceremonial uniform worn by the 1st and 2nd battalions of the 1st Infantry Regiment of the King's Guards, the seniormost of these units and more present in the public duties role, features a scarlet tunic and bearskin cap; similar to the uniforms used by foot guards in the Commonwealth of Nations. The regiment's 3rd battalion uniform features a white tunic and pink facings, with a pink bearskin cap. An RTAF tri-service guard of honour from the King's Guard is mounted during state visits, the naval and air force guardsmen were in the past usually cadets from their respective service academies.

==== Turkmenistan ====
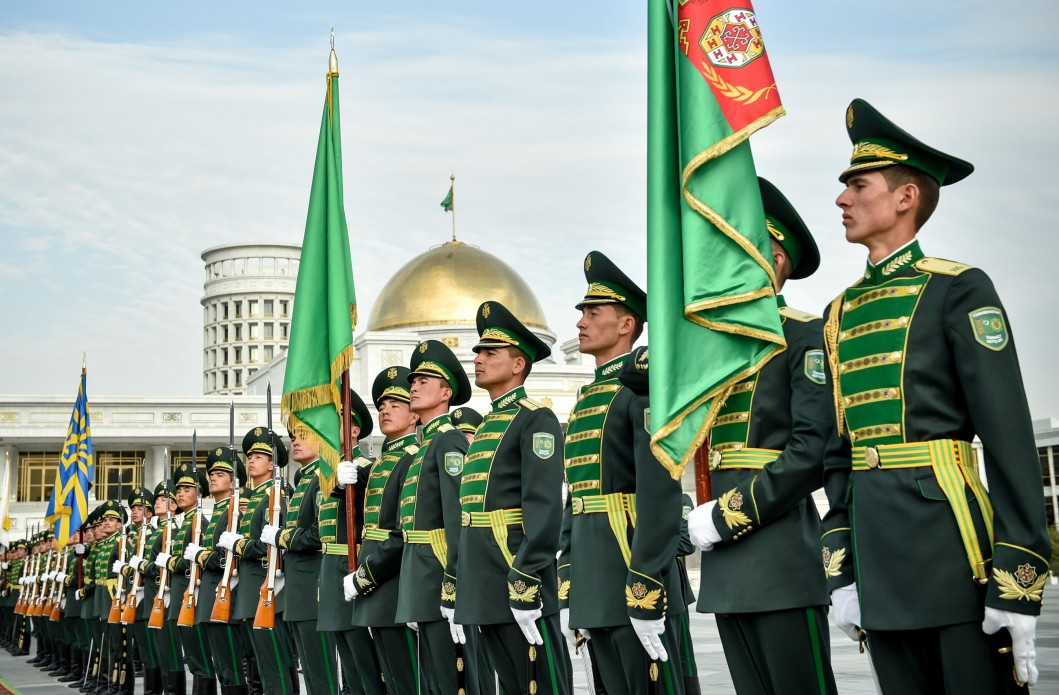
Guards of honour from the Turkmenistani Independent Guard Battalion during a Ukrainian state visit to Turkmenistan, 2015

The Independent Honor Guard Battalion of the Ministry of Defence of Turkmenistan usually provides military ceremony in the country. It comprises 100 soldiers representing the three main armed forces service branches: the Turkmen Ground Forces, Air Force, and Navy.

The battalion is always in attendance at all military and social events involving the President of Turkmenistan, and other high-ranking officials in events such as state visits and military parades, and is the first military formation to march on Independence Square in the annual Independence Day Parade.

The honor guard greets foreign leaders visiting Turkmenistan, guards the National Museum of Turkmenistan and maintains a horse squadron for ceremonial escorts of important Ashgabat visitors.

==== Uzbekistan ====
Ceremonial honour guards of the Armed Forces of the Republic of Uzbekistan are provided by the Honour Guard Battalion of the Tashkent Military District, which is under the auspices of the Ministry of Defence and is based in the Tashkent Region. The battalion is composed of over 100 soldiers, with each platoon being made up of servicemen from different branches of the armed forces. The ceremonial company of the Uzbekistan National Guard provided the guard of honour and served as pallbearers for the late Uzbek president Islam Karimov after his death in September 2016.

==== Vietnam ====
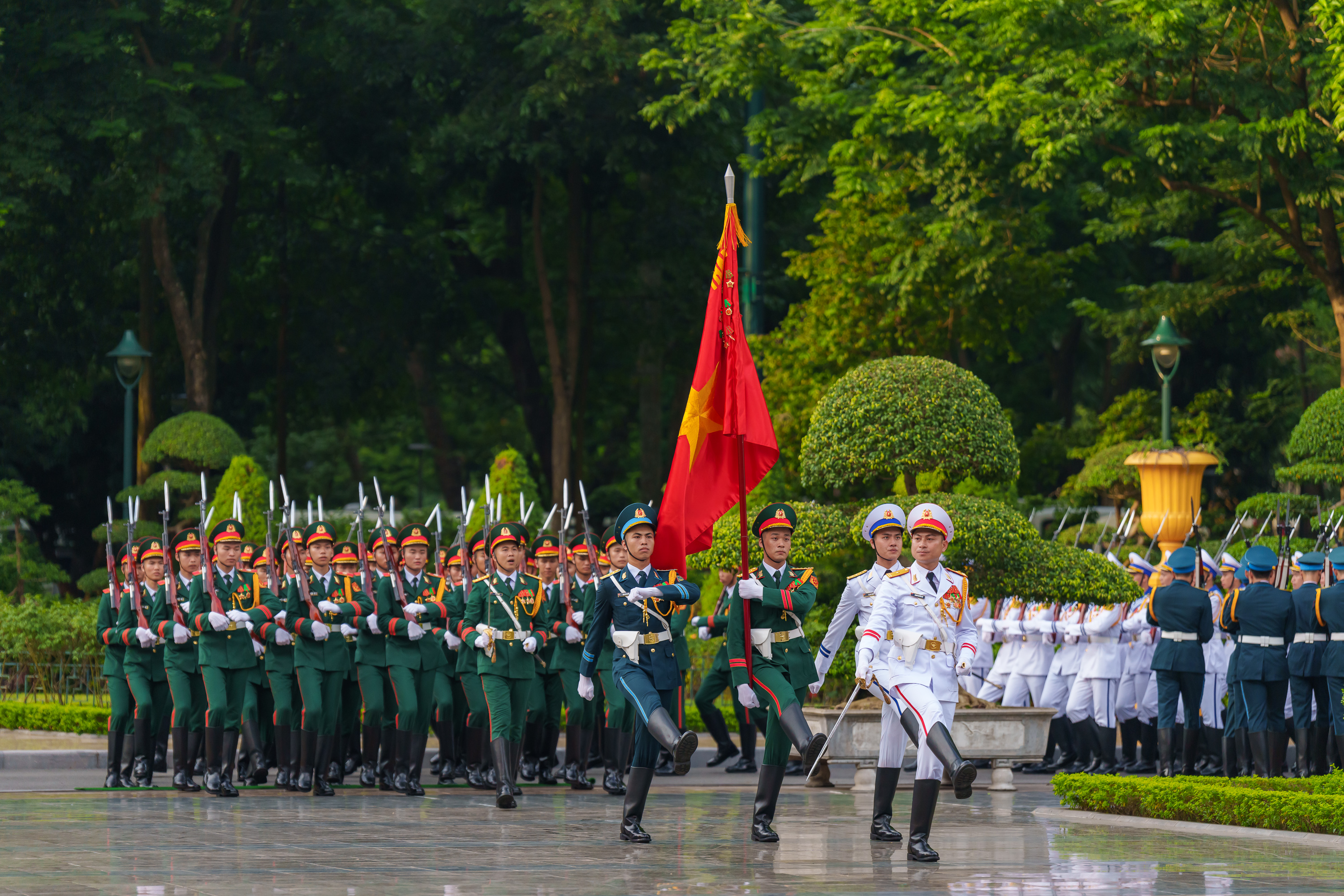
Military Honour Guard Battalion of the Vietnam People's Army of the Ministry of National Defence.

Two honour guard units fall under the People's Army of Vietnam, the Military Honour Guard Battalion of the Vietnam People's Army, and the Command of Ho Chi Minh Mausoleum Honour Guard. The military honour guard of the Vietnam People's Army provides the honour guard for state visits to the country, the National Day parade, days of remembrance, state funerals, and other functions as may be directed. The military honour guard unit is a part of the General Staff of the Vietnam People's Army. Honour guards at the Ho Chi Minh Mausoleum Honour Guard serve as the honour guard for the mausoleum.

=== Europe ===
==== Albania ====
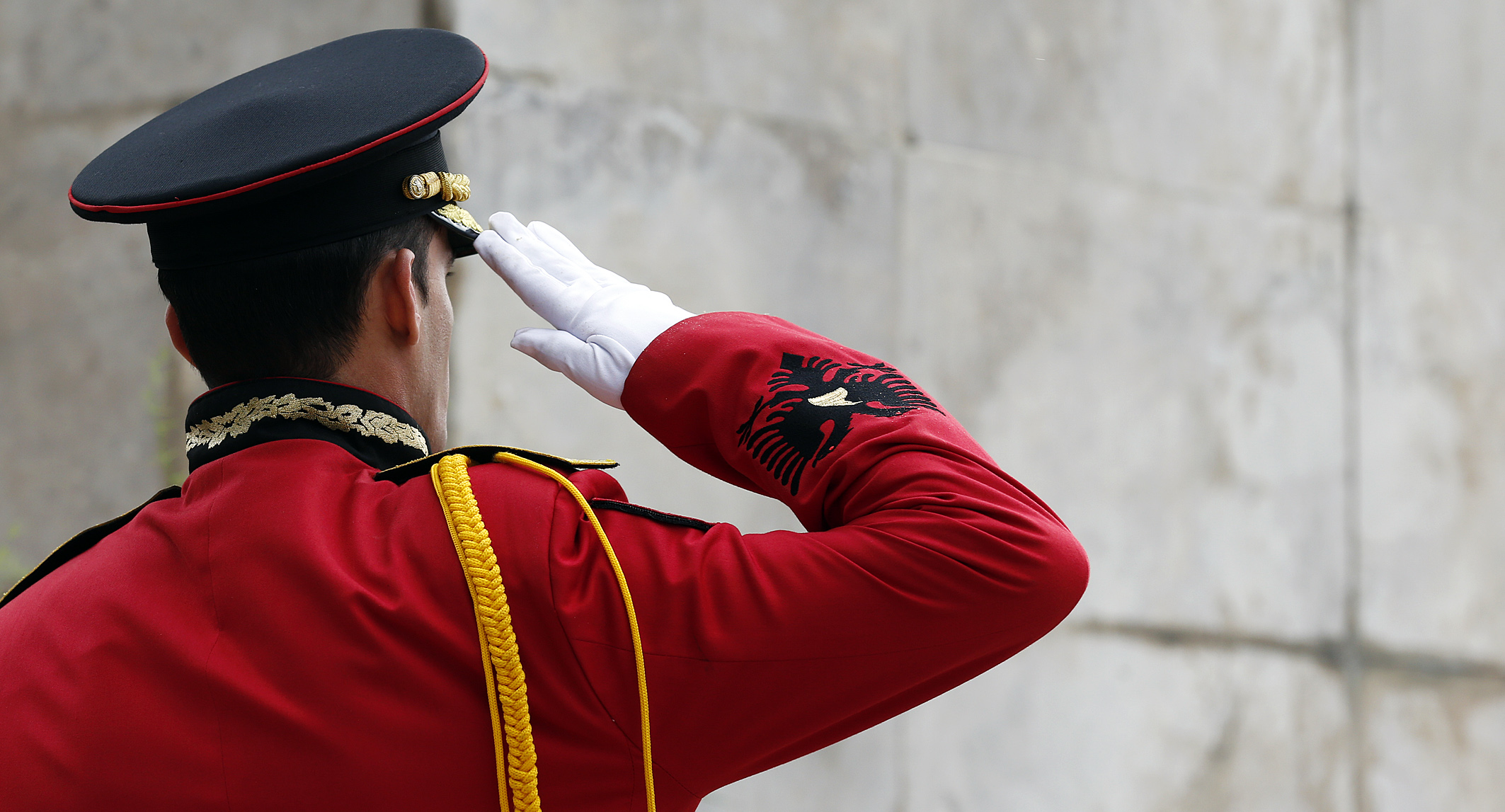
A member of the battalion saluting during the 100th Anniversary of the Independence of Albania in 2012.

The Albanian Republican Guard, established in 1928, is a law enforcement unit in Albania. They wear dark blue or black uniforms with gold trimmings and plumed helmets, they serve as the ceremonial honor guard for the President and high-ranking officials. Beyond their formal duties, they engage with tourists at the Presidential Palace in Tirana.

==== Armenia ====
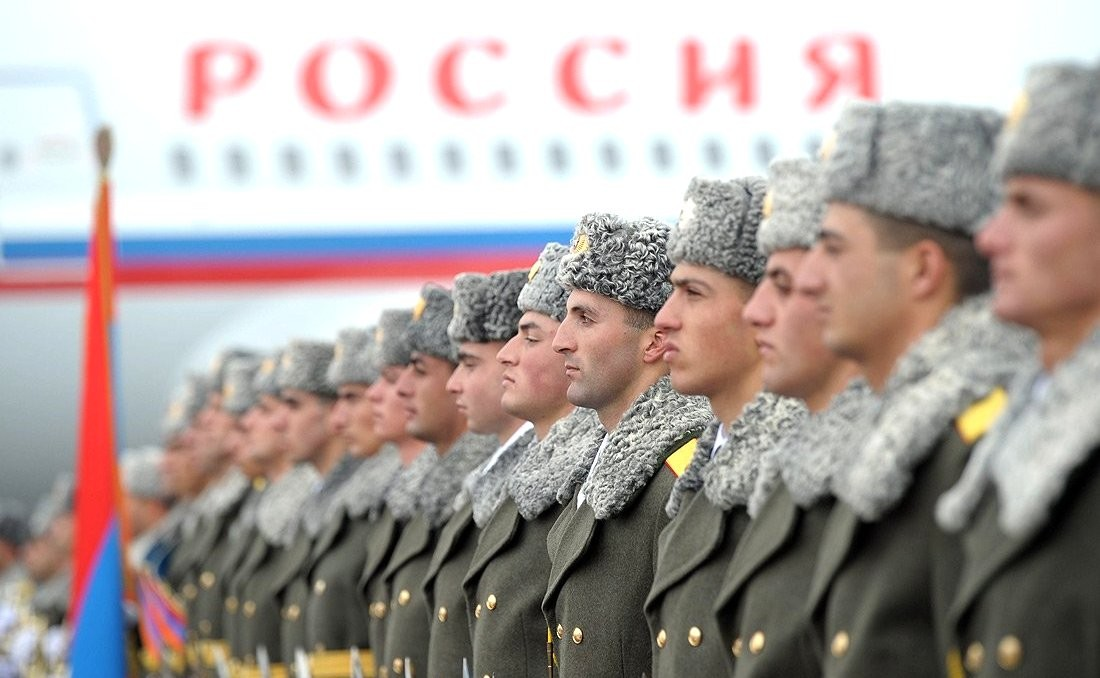
Members from the Armenian Honour Guard Company during a Russian state visit to Armenia, 2013

Honour guards from the Armed Forces of Armenia are provided by the Honour Guard Battalion of the Ministry of Defence of Armenia, which is stationed at the defence ministry's headquarters in Yerevan. The battalion was founded on the basis of the Honour Guard Unit of the 7th Guards Army of the Red Army. Since 2018, soldiers of battalion have acted as sentries at the Presidential Residence. The Armenian Police maintains their own Honour Guard Battalion, which serves under the auspices of the Yerevan Police Headquarters. Outside of public duties, the police guard of honour also takes part in law enforcement activities in the capital.

==== Austria ====
The Guard Battalion (German: Gardebataillon) of the Austrian Armed Forces is the ceremonial unit in Austria. The main task is to represent Austria at home and abroad. It is stationed exclusively at Maria Theresien Barracks in Vienna and maintains the Guards Band Vienna (German: Gardemusik) as well.

==== Azerbaijan ====
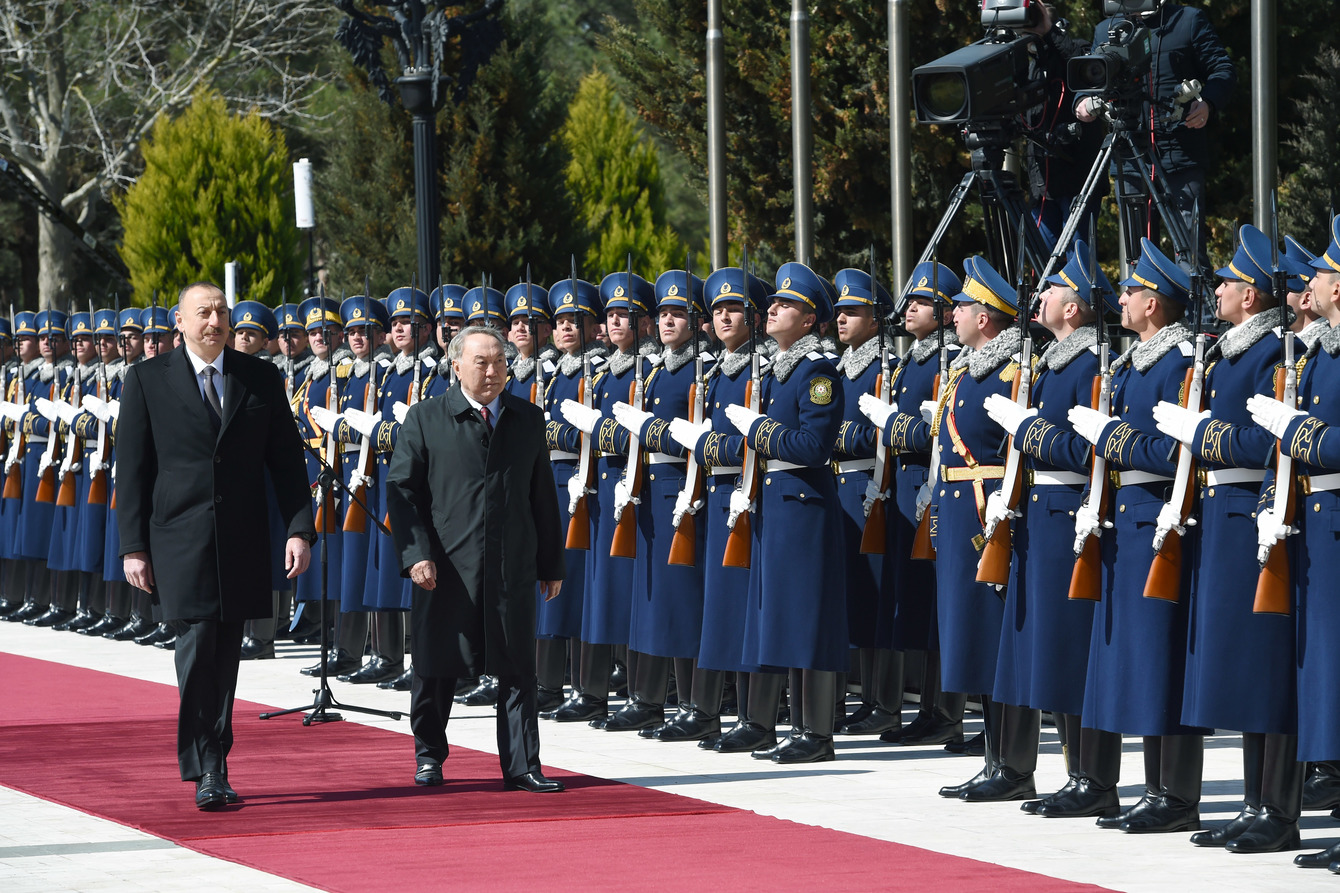
Kazakh president Nursultan Nazarbayev inspect a guard of honour formed by the Azerbaijani National Guard, 2017

In Azerbaijan, military honour guards during state visits are provided by the Azerbaijani National Guard of the Special State Protection Service of Azerbaijan. It is subordinate to the President of Azerbaijan, and has responsibilities that range from protecting government officials to mounting the guard of honour for state visits and military parades. A joint-service honour guard subordinate to the Ministry of Defence is also available and is usually mounted for military officials. Garrison honour guards are also maintained, with the commander of the unit being appointed by special order of the Chief of General Staff. In the Soviet era, the 4th cadet battalion of the Baku Higher Combined Arms Command School maintained a special honour guard unit that served as the official ceremonial ambassador of the military forces of the Azerbaijan SSR, participating in welcoming ceremonies at Binah Airport (now Heydar Aliyev International Airport).

==== Belarus ====
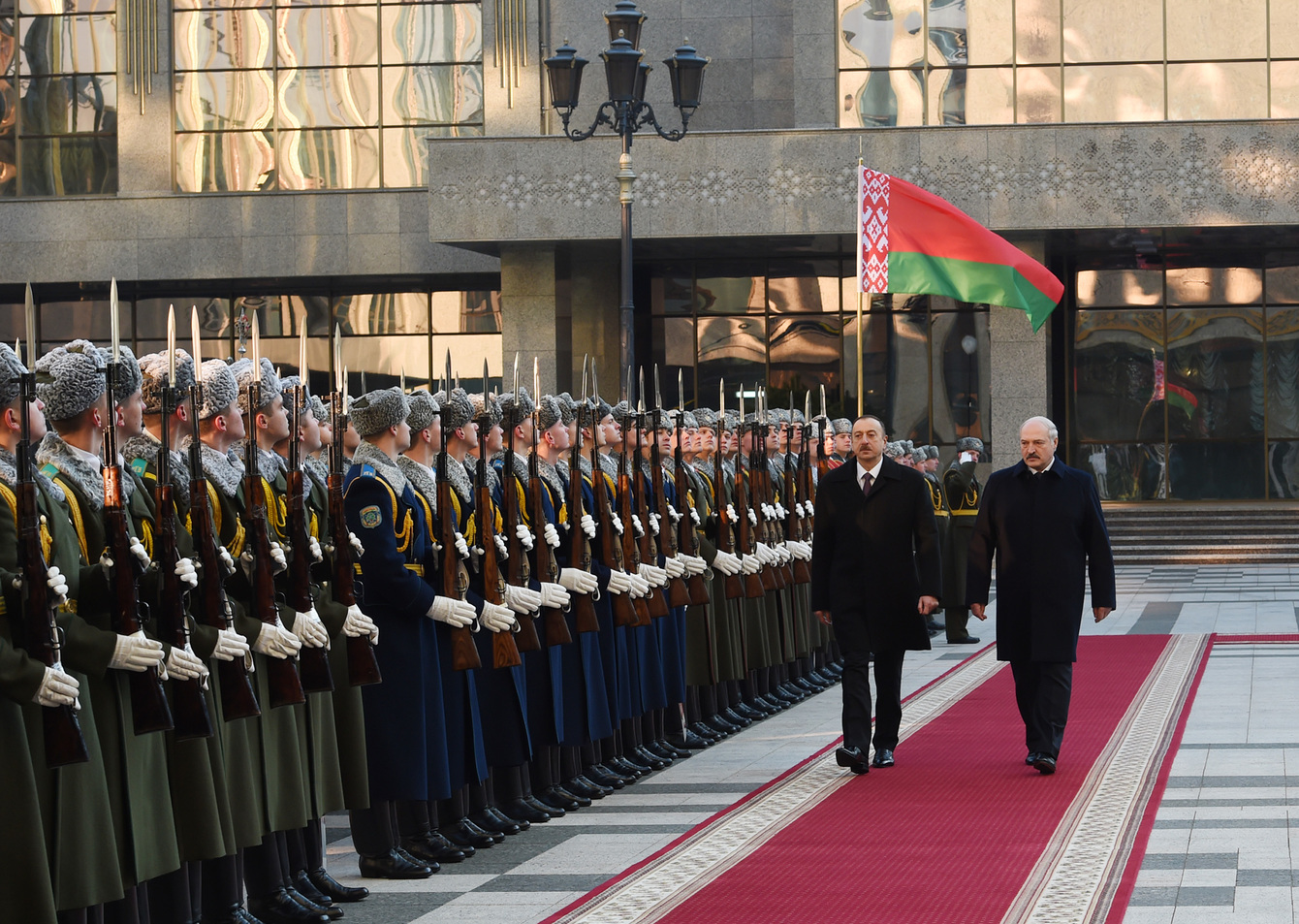
Azerbaijani president inspects the Honour Guard of the Armed Forces of Belarus during a state visit to Belarus, 2018

The Honour Guard of the Armed Forces of Belarus is the primary honour guard battalion of the Armed Forces of Belarus. It was created in 1995 as a result of a combination of two drill teams from different military academies in the country (the Minsk Air Defence and Rocket School and the Minsk Higher Military Command School specifically). The main honour guard is based in the capital of Minsk, under the direct command of the Minsk Military Commandant, while subordinate units are available all over the country. An example of an affiliated honour guard is the Honour Guard of the Military Faculty of the Yanka Kupala State University of Grodno (formed in 2010). It is currently composed of personnel from the Armed Forces, Internal Troops, and Border Troops.

==== Belgium ====
The Belgian Royal Escort (Dutch: Koninklijk escorte te paard, French: Escorte royale à cheval) is a horse-mounted unit that accompanies the King of Belgium on ceremonial occasions. It also provides escorts for foreign visiting heads of state and ambassadors presenting their credentials at the Royal Palace in Brussels.

The Royal Escort is not a full-time unit but is brought together on major ceremonies. Formerly a part of the Belgian Gendarmerie (now defunct), it is provided by units of the Belgian Federal Police. The uniform is composed of a black bearskin with red plume, black tunic and white breeches. Troopers carry a red-yellow-black pennant on their lance.

Occasionally, foot guards of honor is provided by cadets from the Royal Military Academy in their night-blue full dress uniform with shako and white plume/hackle.

==== Bosnia and Herzegovina ====
The Armed Forces of Bosnia and Herzegovina maintains a representative honour guard unit of the Armed Forces of BiH. Dressed in their notable blue and yellow uniforms, the OSBiH Honour Guard Company provides honours at all important state and military events, representing the Presidency of Bosnia and Herzegovina and the OSBiH. The unit was officially presented to the Chairman of the Presidency of Bosnia and Herzegovina for development on 26 November 2004 and was the first formed unit of the OSBiH. In the first twenty days of its existence, intensive training was conducted in the Butmir camp, supervised by British Army officers in the Household Division. By 2007, the unit had been a fully functional structure in the OSBiH, operating under the Military Police Battalion in Sarajevo. The organizational and formation structure of the company as of 2019 includes the Headquarters Group, Colour guard, 1st Platoon, 2nd Platoon, and 3rd Platoon. In the autonomous Republika Srpska, the Honour Unit of Ministry of Interior serves as the official guard of honour for the republic, acting in a similar fashion to the Serbian Guards Unit.

==== Bulgaria ====
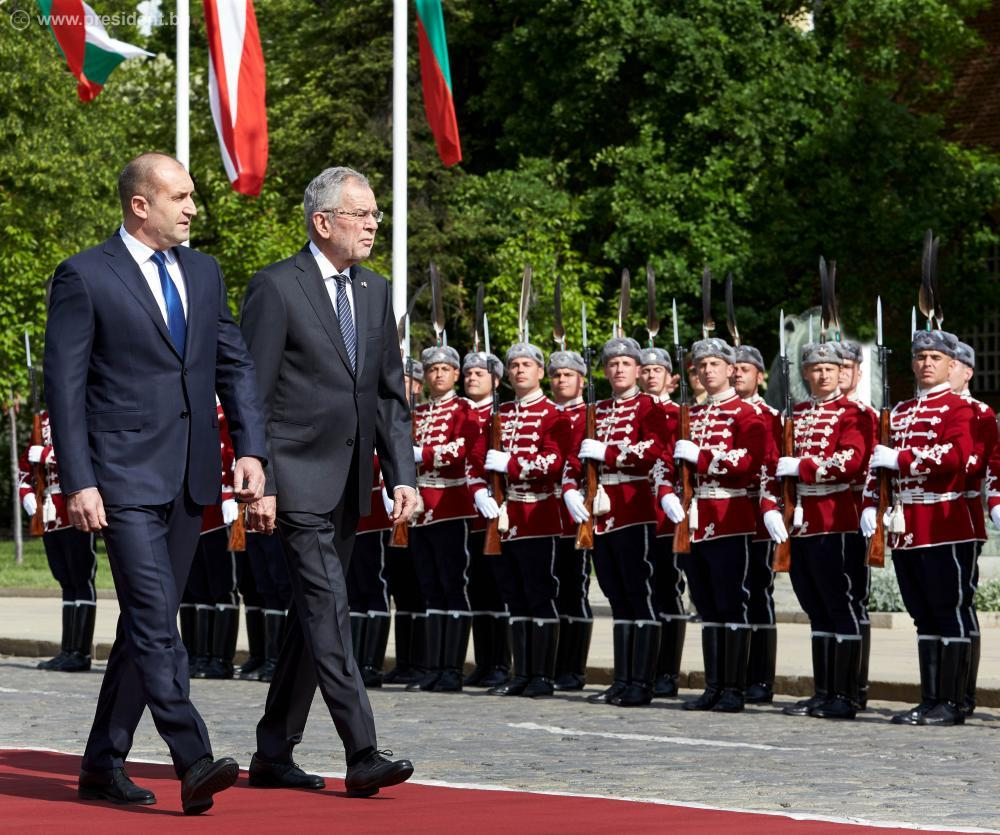
Austrian president Alexander Van der Bellen during his official visit to Bulgaria in 2018. A guard of honour formed by the National Guards Unit of Bulgaria is visible behind him.

The National Guards Unit, established 1878, is the official guard of honour of the Armed forces of Bulgaria. In 2001 the National Guards Unit was declared as the Army's officially designated representative formation and one of the symbols of modern state authority along with the flag, the coat of arms and the national anthem. It is organized as a two-battalion regiment, with a military band and two guard of honour battalions as well as service support units directly under the regimental HQ.

==== Croatia ====
In Croatia, the Honour Guard Battalion serves as the guard of honour. The Honour Guard Battalion performs protocol tasks for the needs of top-level state and military officials, as well as tasks related to the protection and security of the President of the Republic of Croatia. It consists of up to 300 members. The unit is under the direct command of the General Staff of the Armed Forces of the Republic of Croatia.

==== Czech Republic ====
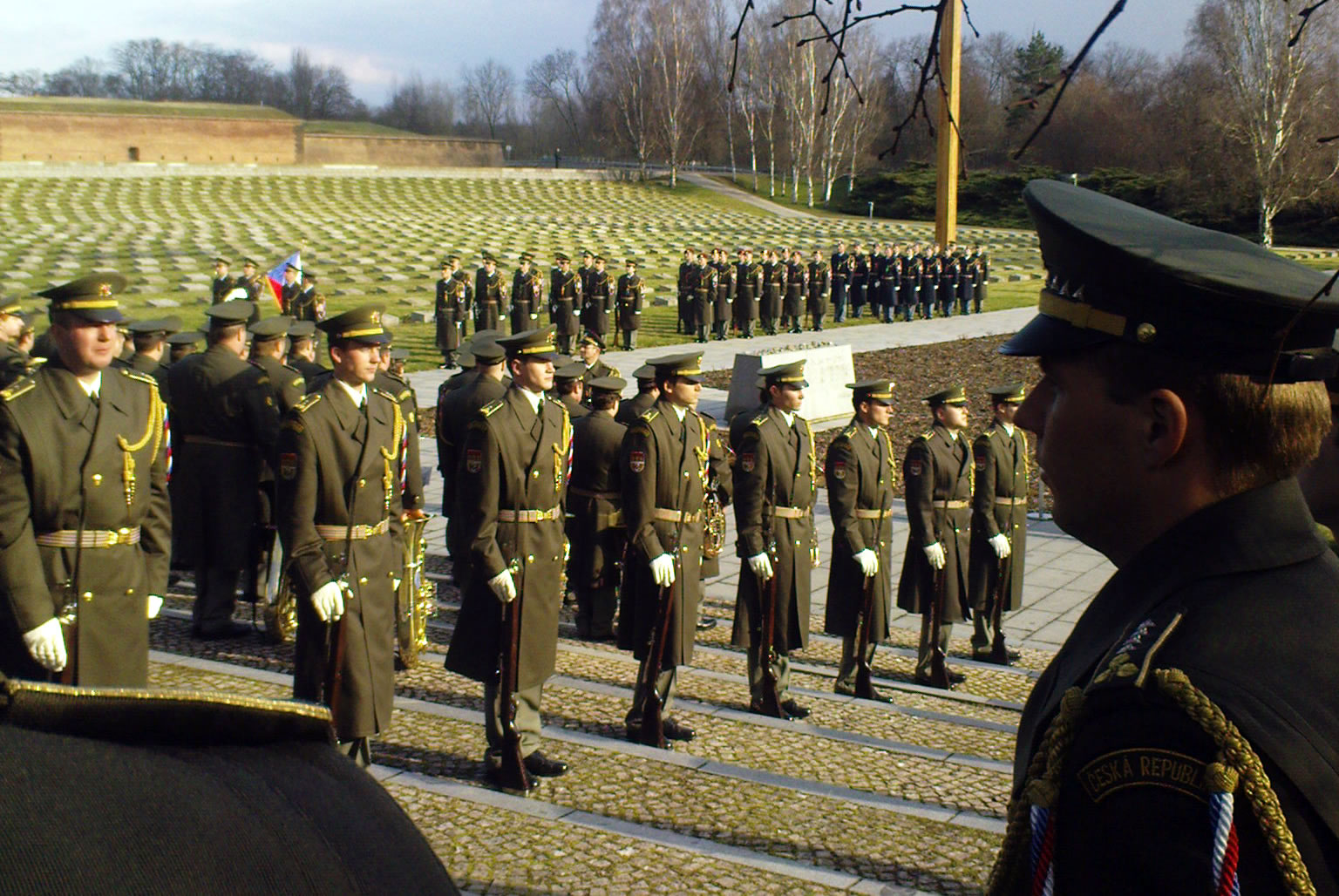
Honour guards from the Prague Castle Guard form a cordon at a cemetery during an Israeli state visit to the Czech Republic, 2009

Ceremonial duties are usually performed by the Prague Castle Guard, a special unit of the armed forces of the Czech Republic, organized under the Military Office of the President of the Czech Republic, which is directly subordinate to the President of the Republic.

The Army of the Czech Republic also maintains the Honour Guard of the Czech Armed Forces, which was founded in 2005. The company is currently made of 38 soldiers, including its commander. The company is also made up of three colour guard members, 27 honour guards, and four reserve members.

==== Denmark ====
The Royal Life Guards is an infantry regiment of the Danish Army. It serves in two roles: as a front line combat unit, and as a guard/ceremonial unit to the Danish monarchy. Danish Amalienborg palace is guarded by this unit day and night. The Guard Hussar Regiment Mounted Squadron also serves ceremonial purposes, such as providing escorts for VIPs and performing public duties.

==== Estonia ====
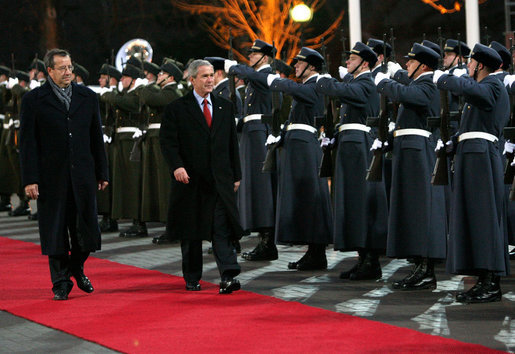
Guard Battalion honour company presenting arms for the President of the United States George W. Bush

The Guard Battalion is a specialized unit under the Military Police of the Estonian Defence Forces, which conducts ceremonial duties and prepares military police units. The Battalion also guards the Estonian presidential palace day and night.

==== Finland ====
The Guard Jaeger Regiment is located in Santahamina, near the capital Helsinki, and carries the ceremonial duties necessary for visiting guests of honour.

==== France ====
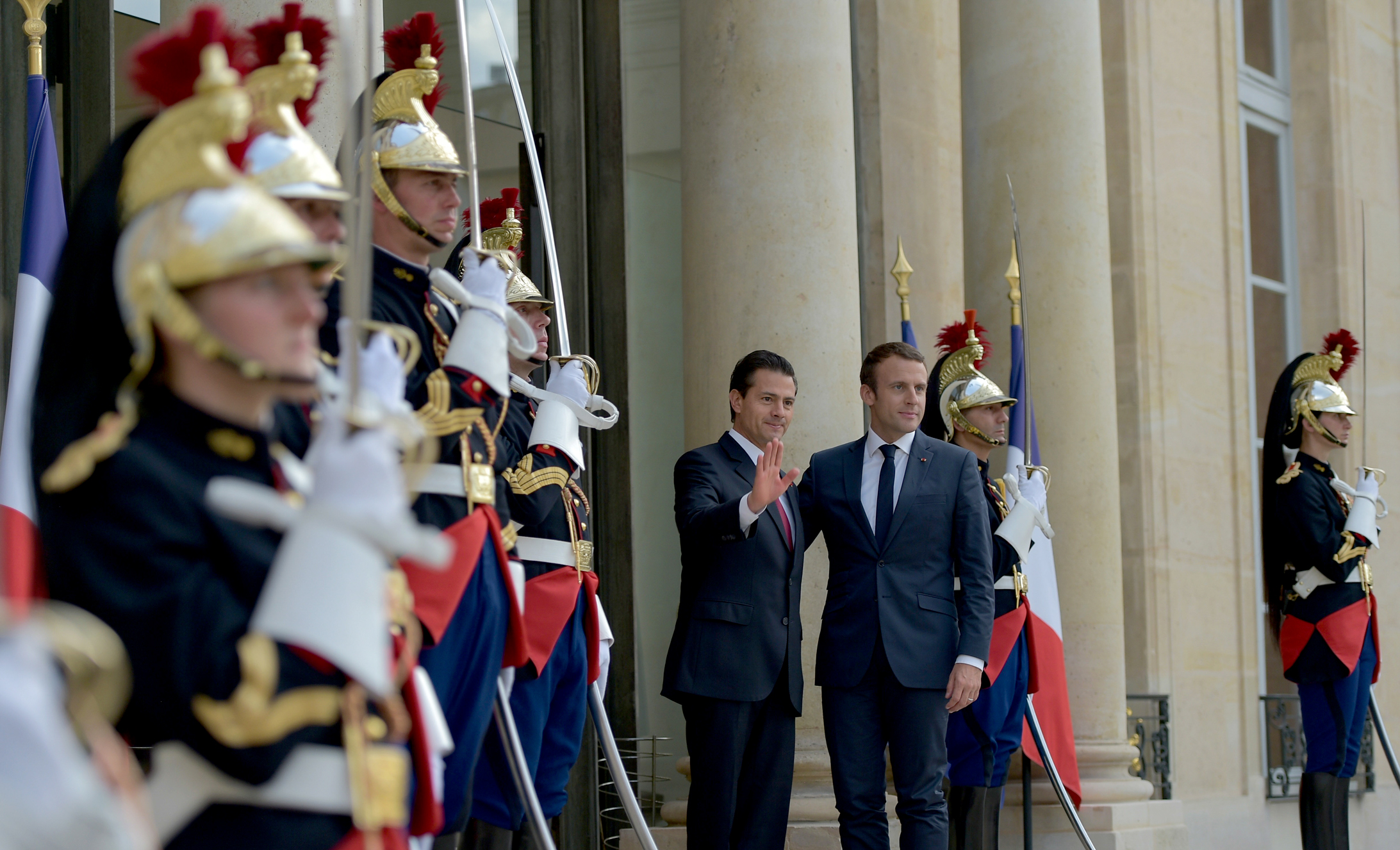
French Republican Guards stand as the guard of honour during a Mexican state visit to France, 2017

The Republican Guard of the National Gendarmerie provides both foot and horse-mounted guards of honour for the city of Paris. It specifically provides ceremonial security to the Élysée Palace, the Hôtel Matignon, the Palais du Luxembourg, the Palais Bourbon, and the Palais de Justice. A quad-service honour guard company composed of members of the Republican Guard, as well as personnel from the French Army, French Navy, French Air Force, and the French Foreign Legion, is also used for ceremonial services, primarily state visits and during state funerals involving distinguished civilians and fallen personnel of the armed forces.

A four-regiment unit named the Guards of Honour ("Gardes d'honneur") was established by Napoleon in 1813 to provide additional cavalry to the Grande Armée. It fought in the German campaign of 1813 and the campaign in north-east France (1814) before it was disbanded after the Bourbon restoration.

==== Georgia ====
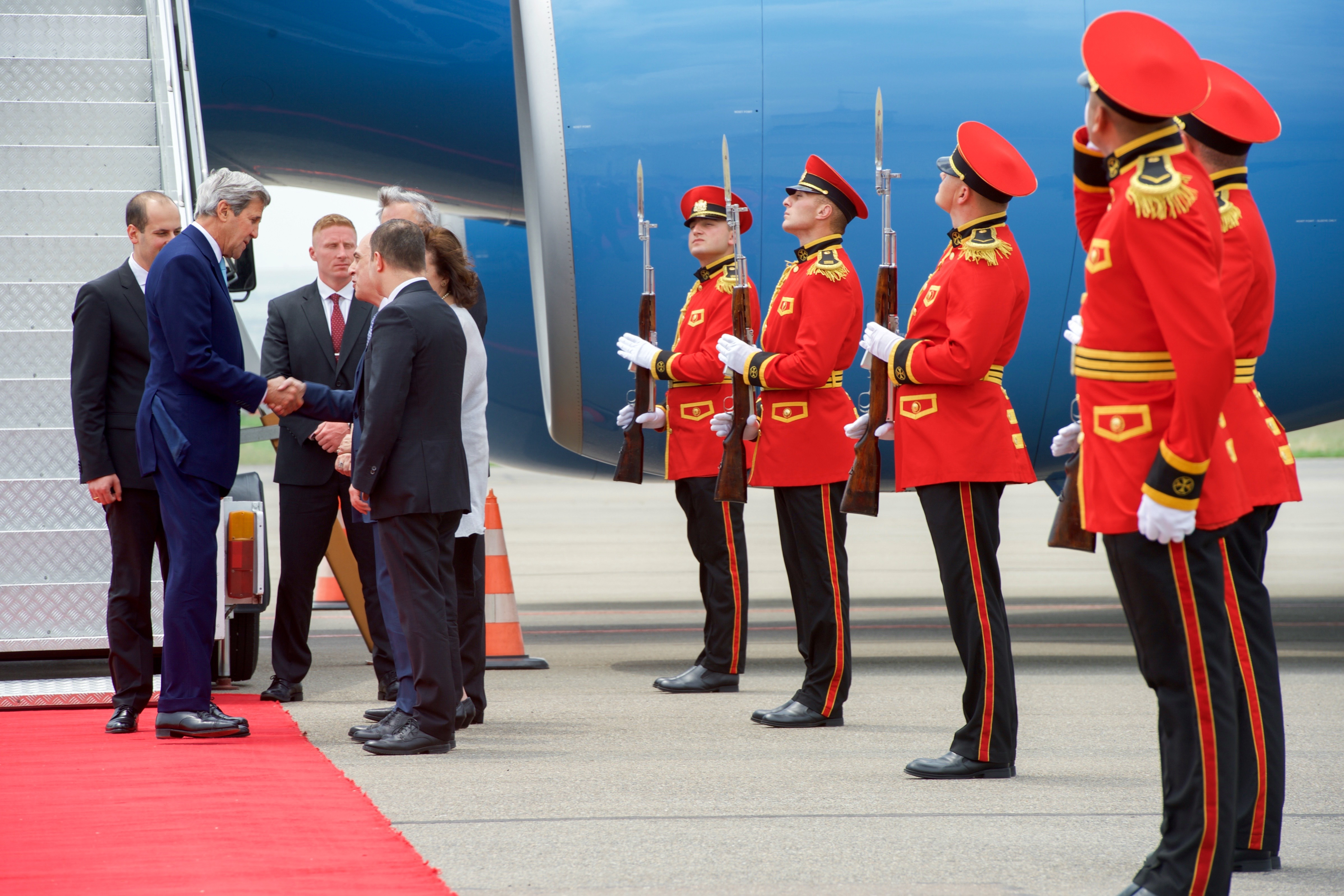
A Georgian military guard of honour present arms as the U.S. secretary of state disembarks from his plane, 2016

Aside from its duties as a rapid emergency response unit, the National Guard of Georgia is also responsible for mounting the guard of honour on behalf of the Defense Forces of Georgia during state visits, state funerals and national holidays. The company-sized unit of the NG also conducts Public duties in the national capital, guarding important structures and buildings in Tbilisi.

==== Germany ====
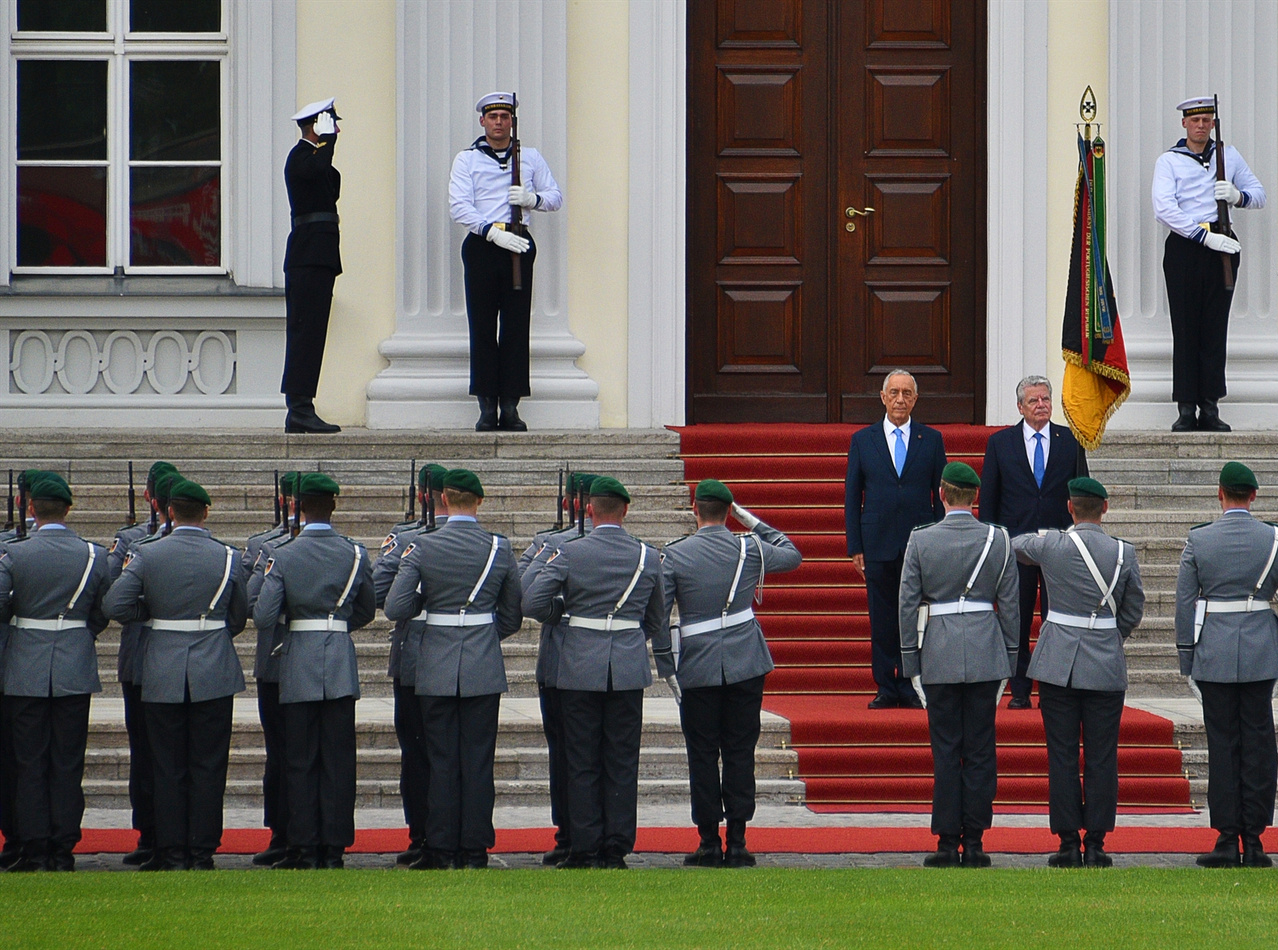
The Wachbataillon forming a guard of honour during Portuguese President Marcelo Rebelo de Sousa's state visit to Germany, 2016

The primary mission of the Wachbataillon is to perform the military honours for the German Federal President, Federal Chancellor, Federal Minister of Defence and the Inspector General of the Bundeswehr during state visits or on similar occasions. In addition, the Wachbataillon takes part in military events and ceremonies of major importance. A secondary mission is to perform ceremonial guard duty at the Ministry of Defence and other high-profile public places, and protect and guard the members of the German government and the Ministry of Defence. Usually, three guard companies made up of personnel of the Bundeswehr make up the guard of honour for the President and other high-ranking officials of the state, as well as during state visits of foreign heads of state and government.

Historical honour guard battalions include the Friedrich Engels Guard Regiment, which served as the primary honour guard regiment for the German Democratic Republic from 1962 to 1990. The Friedrich Engels Guard Regiment also formed a part of the security for the Neue Wache. In Nazi Germany, the guard of honour was provided by both the SS-Verfügungstruppe and the Wachregiment Berlin, the Army's guard and garrison regiment in Berlin.

==== Greece ====
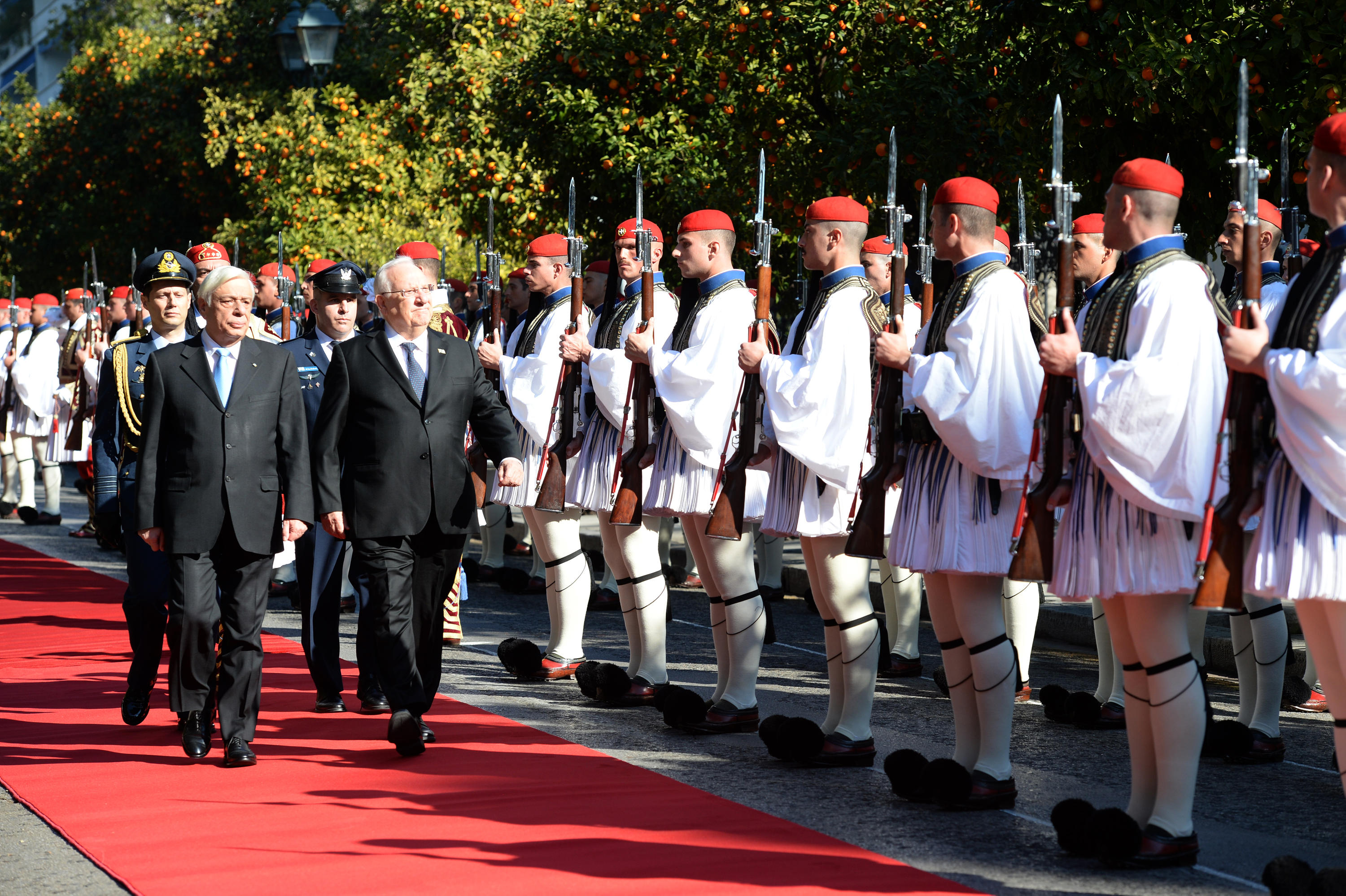
Israeli president Reuven Rivlin inspect a guard of honour formed by the Greek Presidential Guard, 2018

In Greece, the Presidential Guard is a unit of the Greek Army guarding the Tomb of the Unknown Soldier and the Presidential Palace. Its members, known as Evzones, must be taller than 1.85m and are trained hard as their duty includes standing completely still for more than an hour 4 times a day. They are famous for their military discipline, the ability to stand motionless without even blinking, their stylish walking and the uniform which derives from traditional Greek dress. A tri-service guard of honour composed of servicemen from the Hellenic Army, the Hellenic Navy, and the Hellenic Air Force is maintained as part of the Ministry of National Defence.

==== Hungary ====
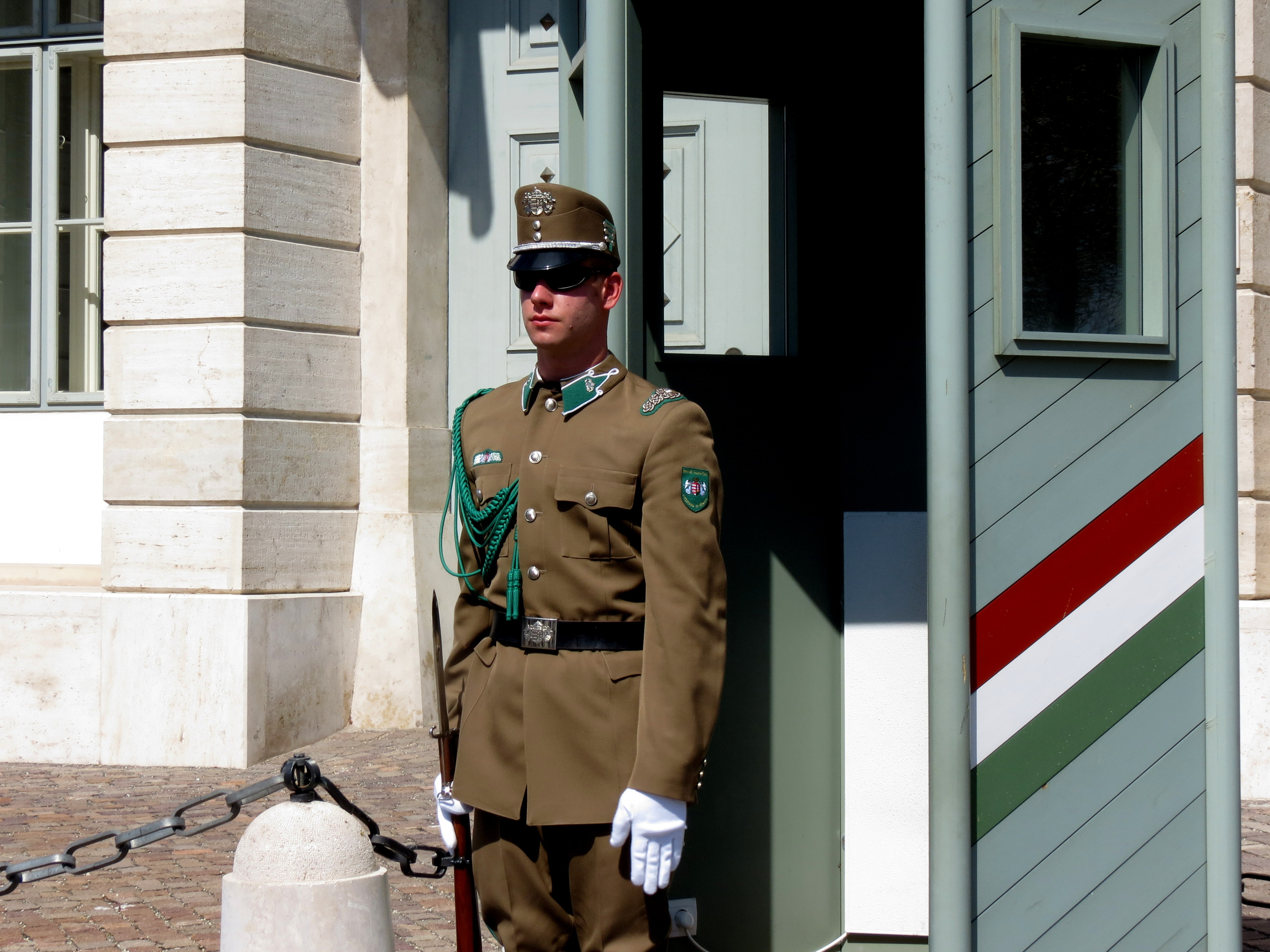
A guard at Sándor Palace in 2013

The official honour guard of the Third Hungarian Republic is currently the Hungarian Defence Forces' 32nd National Home Defence Ceremonial Regiment (32. Nemzeti Honvéd Díszegység), which provides sentries for the Sándor Palace in Budapest.

Until 31 December 2006, Hungary's honour guard duties were performed by the Hungarian Defence Forces' 32nd Budapest Guard and Ceremonial Regiment. After this regiment was disbanded, from 1 January 2007 until 31 December 2010, the honour guard responsibilities were assumed by the Ceremonial Battalion, a unit within the HDF Support Brigade (MH Támogató Dandár). On 1 January 2011, the duty of providing the national honour guard was taken over by the 32nd National Home Defence Ceremonial Regiment, which is also part of the MH Támogató Dandár.

During the period of the Hungarian People's Republic, the official honour guard was the Hungarian People's Army's 7015th Ceremonial Regiment.

==== Ireland ====
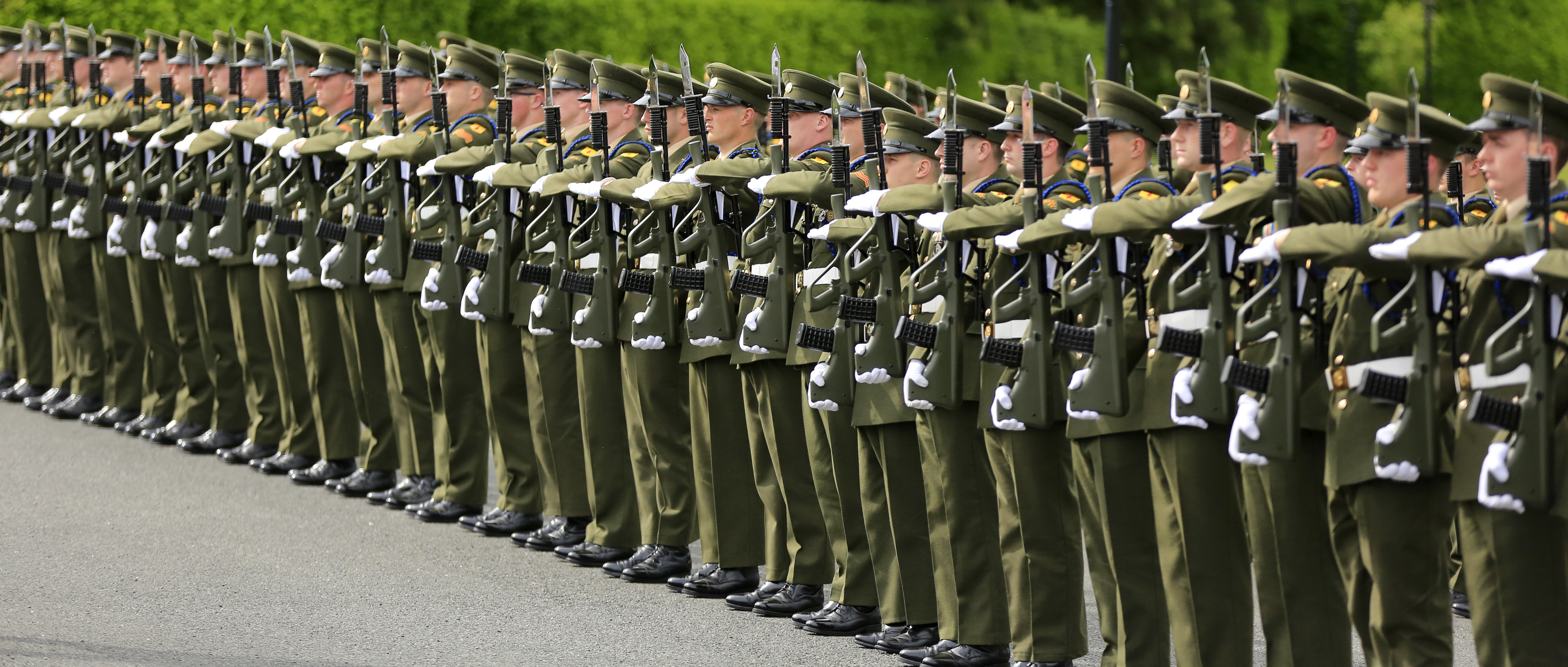
Honour guards from the Irish Ceremonial Military Guard during a Mozambican state visit to Ireland, 2014

In Ireland, a guard of honour is drawn from the Irish Army and is called 'Garda Onóra' in Irish. It is inspected by the President of Ireland, Taoiseach or visiting dignitaries. Specifically, battalions from the Infantry Corps are drawn for guards of honour, to form the Ceremonial Military Guard. Personnel carry dignitaries. Personnel of the guard carry Steyr AUG rifles and wear the Service Dress (SD) on ceremonial occasions. The Irish Defence Forces guard of honour participates in ceremonial events such as the National Day of Commemoration, the National Famine Commemoration and the Easter Parade. Guards of honour also take part in the Changing of the Guard at Merrion Square park in the capital.

The Blue Hussars also performed public duties for the Irish Army until it was dissolved in 1948.

==== Italy ====
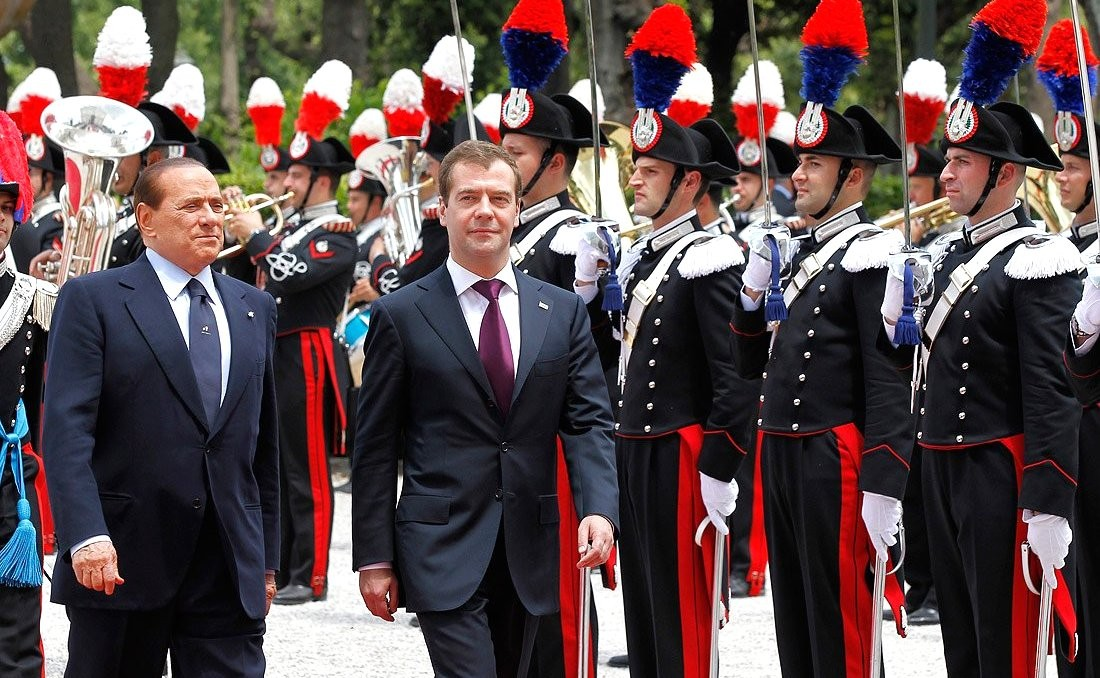
Russian President Medvedev inspects a guard of honour formed by the Italian Carabinieri, 2011

In Italy the unit institutionally intended to act as an honour guard to the President of the Italian Republic is the Corazzieri Regiment, a special branch of the Carabinieri. The Corazzieri follow the President during official occasions and are also partly responsible for the internal security of the Quirinal Palace. In addition to the Corazzieri, there are other honour units chosen from the different Armed Forces, specifically for representation purposes. These units have to stand guard at important places, such as the gates of the seats of the Chamber of Deputies and the Senate, at the Tomb of the Unknown Soldier in the Altar of the Homeland, and at the gates of the Quirinal Palace.

Other honour guards units are formed within all branches of the Italian Armed Forces, namely the Honour Company of the 1° Regiment "Granatieri di Sardegna"and the honour squadron from the 8° Regiment "Lancieri di Montebello" of the Italian Army, the Capitol Honour Services Company of the Italian Navy and the Honour Company of the Italian Air Force, all stationed in Rome.

Guards of honour are also drawn by local units within Rome of the Guardia di Finanza and Polizia di Stato.

==== Kosovo ====
The Kosovo Security Force maintains the Ceremonial Guard (Albanian: Garda ceremoniale), which serves as the guard of honour of the FSK. It provides ceremonial duties on all public holidays such as Independence Day, Constitution Day and Europe Day.

==== Moldova ====
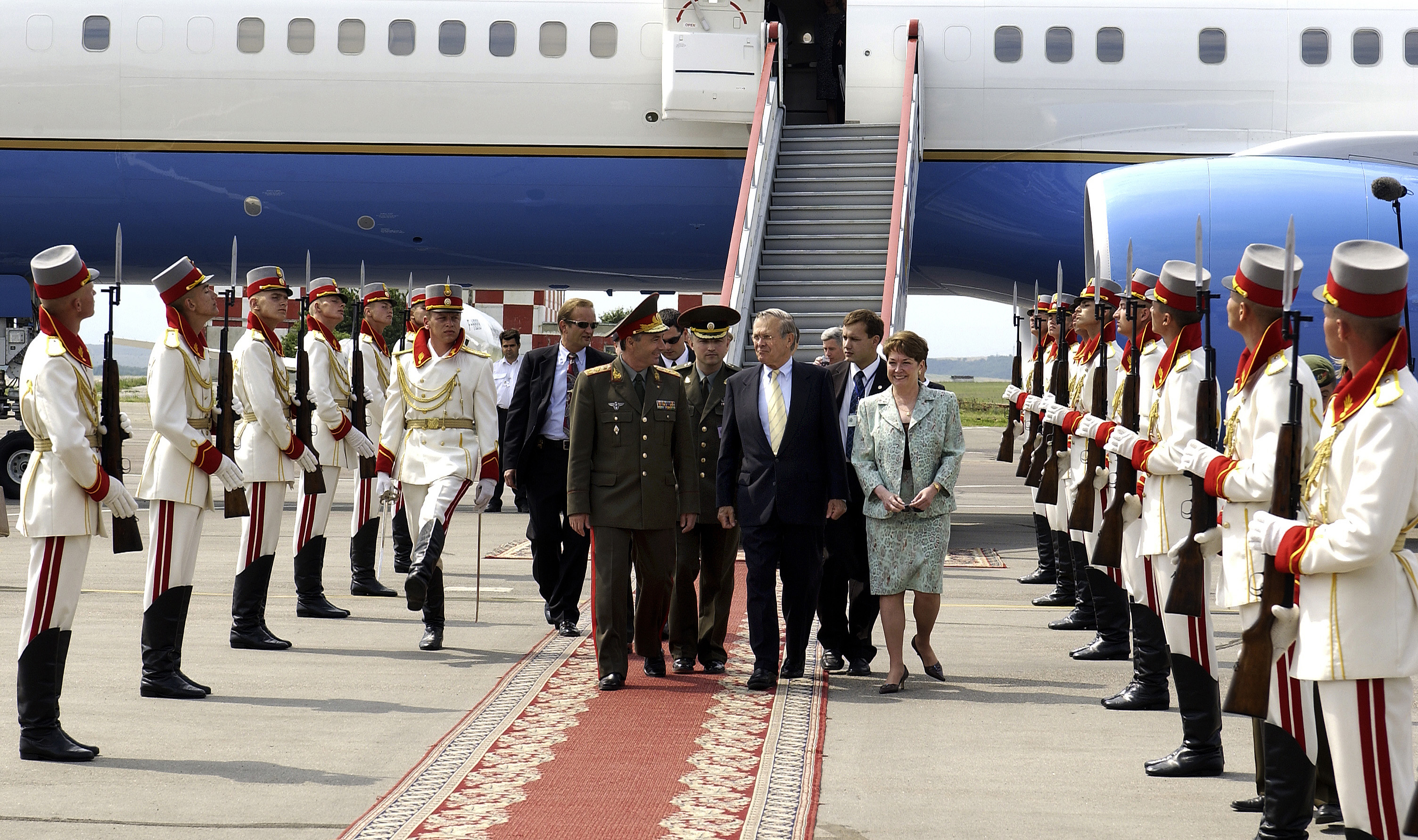
Moldovan and U.S. dignitaries walk through a guard of honour cordon formed by the Honour Guard Company, 2004

In Moldova, ceremonial honour guards are based on both the Russian and Romanian traditions and precedent. The two main honour guard units of the country are the Honour Guard Company of the Moldovan National Army and the Honour Guard of the Ministry of Internal Affairs (consisting of cadets of the Ștefan cel Mare Police Academy). The former unit provides personnel to conduct regular public duties in the capital of Chișinău, particularly for the President of Moldova in his/her position as Supreme Commander in Chief. It is the currently only unit in the Moldovan military to utilize the Soviet-style goose step. The latter unit is notable for its use of Stefan cel Mare era uniforms in its exhibition drill routine.

==== Monaco ====
The Honour Guard function of the Principality of Monaco are carried by the Compagnie des Carabiniers du Prince ("Prince's Riflemen Company").

==== Netherlands ====
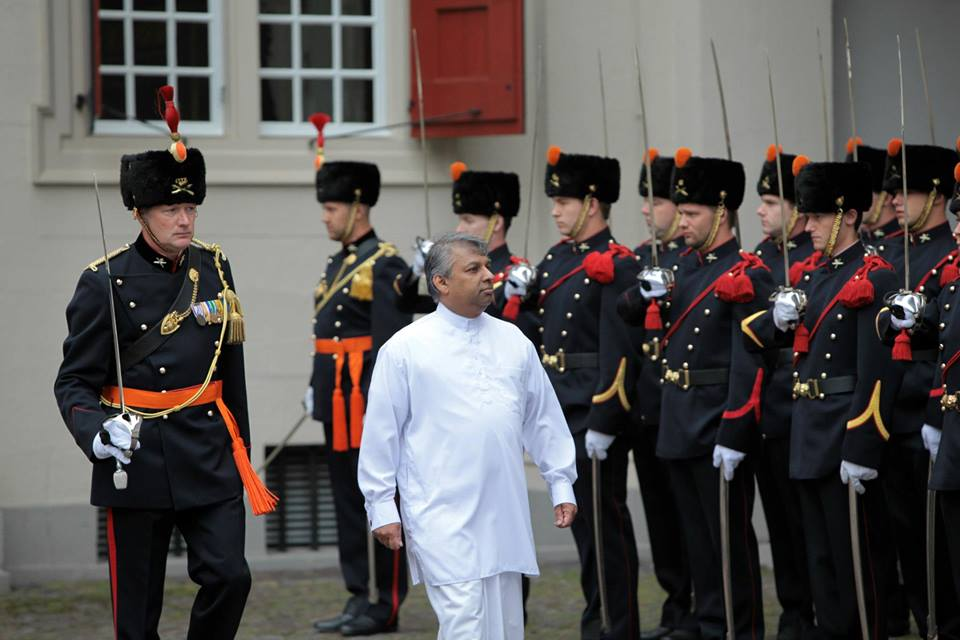
The Sri Lankan ambassador to the Netherlands inspects a Dutch guard of honour, 2021

The Honour Guards in Netherlands consists of two guard regiments, Garderegiment Grenadiers en Jagers and Garderegiment Fuseliers Prinses Irene, both from the Royal Netherlands Army. Until 1995 there were three. These regiments, organized as single infantry battalions, provide much of the protocol guards during state holidays in the Netherlands. Guard of honour detachments for public duties are also maintained by the Royal Netherlands Navy, Royal Netherlands Air Force and the Royal Marechaussee.

==== North Macedonia ====
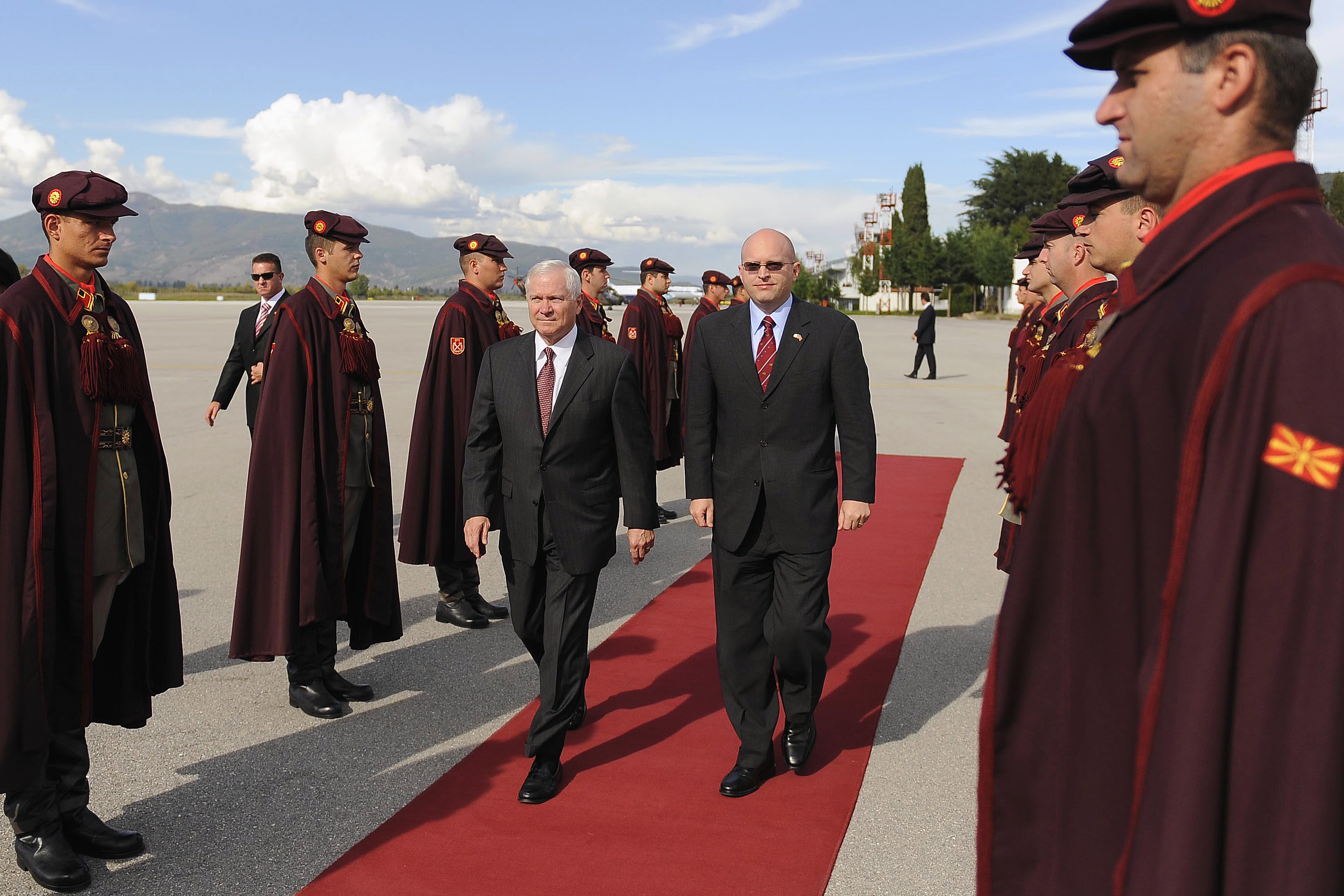
U.S. secretary of defence Robert Gates walks through a guard of honour cordon formed by the Macedonian Honour Guard, 2008

North Macedonia's Ceremonial Guard Battalion is part of the Army of the Republic of North Macedonia which is mainly used for ceremonial purposes. It is the personal guard of the President of North Macedonia. The National Guard can be often seen near the presidential palace, during official visits of foreign presidents or delegations, ceremonies, and during the days of the flag. In 2010 the Ministry of Defence proposed and designed new uniforms for the guards. Both, the old and the new uniforms are based on the uniforms of the Internal Macedonian Revolutionary Organization revolutionaries with some details of the other periods of the history of North Macedonia. Influence over the new design was based on the uniform worn by Bulgarian revolutionary Dedo Iljo Maleshevski and the uniforms of the 19th century Bulgarian Legion regiment which served in the Imperial Russian Army.

==== Norway ====
Hans Majestet Kongens Garde (His Majesty The King's Guard) is a battalion-sized honour guard unit of the Norwegian Army under the ceremonial command and patronage of the King of Norway. Also known as the HMKG, the battalion comprises six companies, with the 3rd company, the famous band and drill company, being the premier ceremonial unit in the HMKG, mostly serving its required public duties at Oslo's Royal Palace.

==== Poland ====
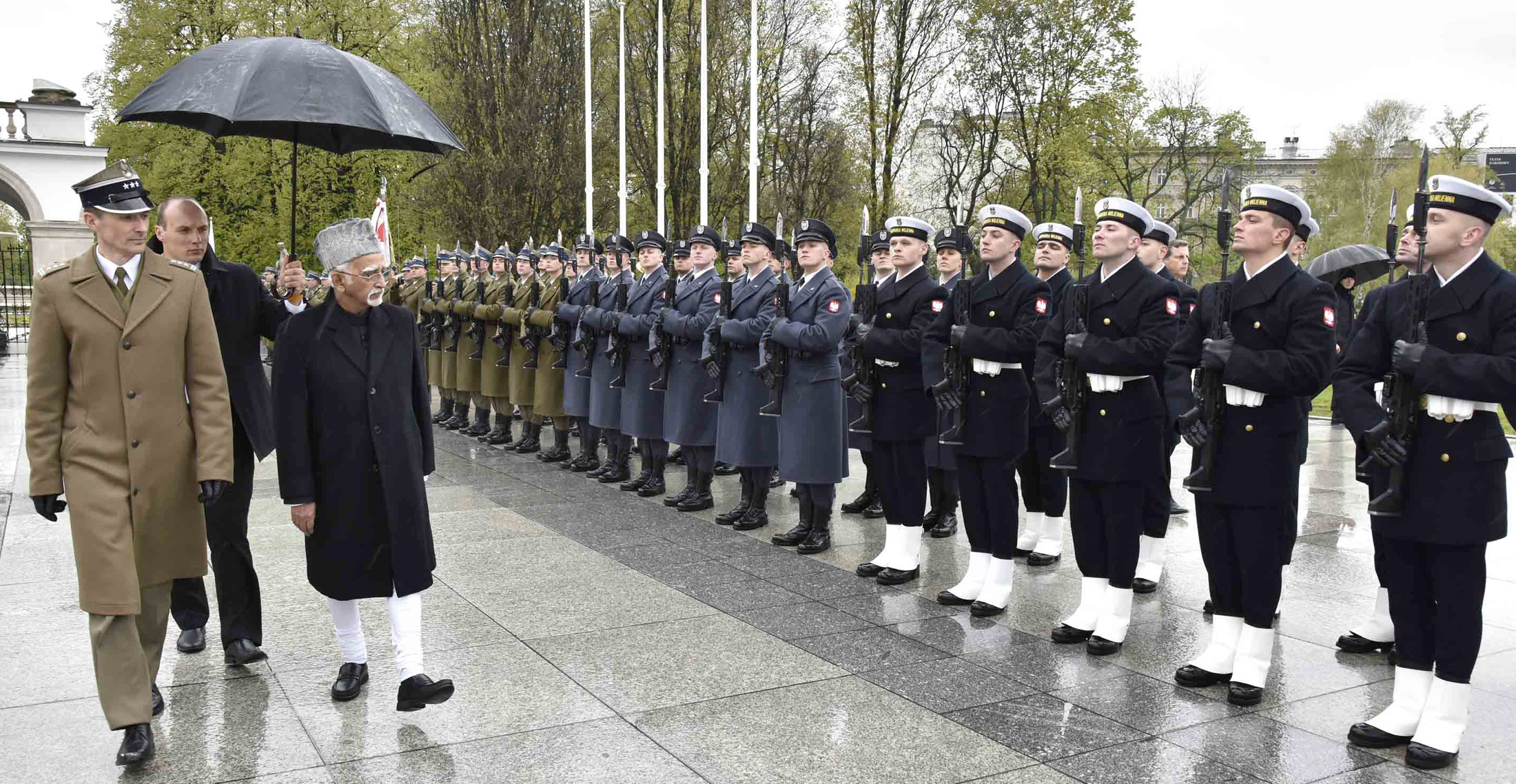
Indian vice president Mohammad Hamid Ansari inspects a guard of honour formed by the Polish military, 2017

The honour guard unit in Poland is the Representative Regiment of the Polish Armed Forces, created on 30 March 2018 on the basis of the Representative Battalion. It performs ceremonial duties on behalf of the armed forces and the President of Poland throughout the capital of Warsaw acting as the combined ceremonial representative for the Polish Armed Forces. It performs annually during the Armed Forces Day parade on Ujazdów Avenue and renders honours to foreign individuals during state arrival ceremonies at the Presidential Palace. Also posted within its ranks is the Presidential Mounted Ceremonial Troop of the Armed Forces, which also acts as an honour guard and horse guard unit. Outside the regiment, which represents the service branches of the Armed Forces (Polish Army, Navy and Air Force) mainly, the Warsaw Garrison and other civil uniformed services all maintain honour guard units of their own, all of which are company-sized.

The Marshal's Guard of the Sejm is the official honour and security unit for the Polish Parliament. Members of the guard are commonly observed guarding the plaque in the front of the Sejm which commemorates the Polish MPs and senators who were killed in the 2010 Polish Air Force Tu-154 crash in Smolensk, Russia. The Honour Guard Company of the Polish Border Guard has operated under the traditions of the Podhale Rifles since 2007. Honour guard companies are also maintained by the Polish Police, Polish Special Forces, Polish Territorial Defence Forces, State Fire Service, Warsaw Capital Garrison, and the Polish Border Guard.

==== Portugal ====
The main honour guard to the President of Portugal is the Security and State Honours Unit (Unidade de Segurança e Honras de Estado, USHE), which is a part of the National Republican Guard. This formation, of regimental size, includes the Presidential Squadron (Esquadrão Presidencial), the Horse Band, the Guard Marching Band, and the State Honours and Security Group, composed of three cavalry squadrons — the 2nd Squadron, a motorcycle unit since 1944, currently stationed in Ajuda, Lisbon; the 3rd Horse Squadron, stationed in Braço de Prata, Marvila; and the 4th Horse Squadron, also stationed in Ajuda — and two infantry companies, one stationed in Ajuda and the other in Necessidades. It carries out its ceremonial duties through armed detachments of guards of honour, usually dismounted but also mounted.It is a directly reporting unit of the Operations Command of the NRG.

==== Romania ====
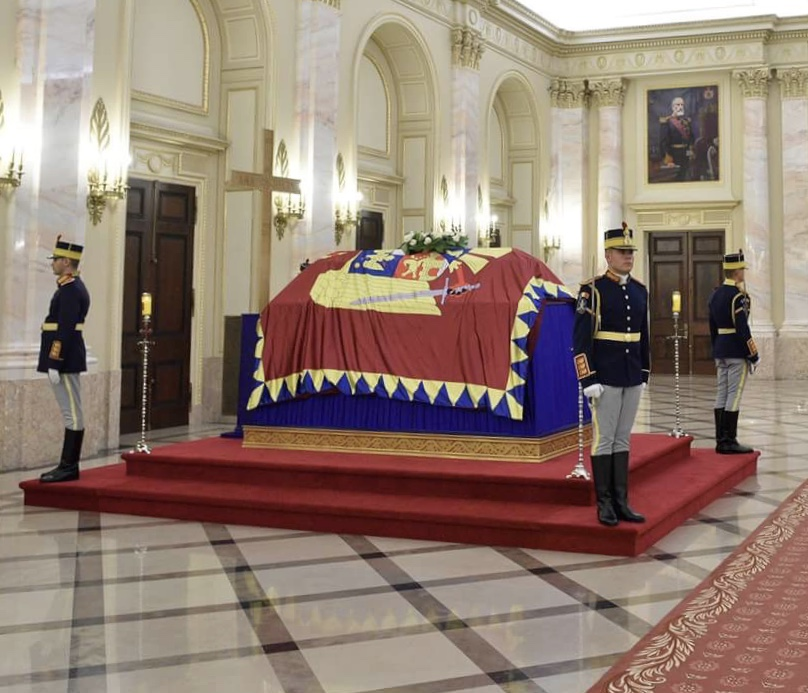
Michael the Brave 30th Guards Brigade soldiers stand guard of Queen Anne of Romania while she lays in state

Currently, the Michael the Brave 30th Guards Brigade of the Romanian Land Forces serves as the honour guard brigade of the Romanian Armed Forces. The brigade is present at ceremonial events and during visits from international officials.

The Romanian Gendarmerie also maintains an honour guard unit, called Unitatea Specială de Gardă de Onoare și Protecție Instituțională București (Bucharest Institutional Protection and Honour Guard Special Unit), and a horse guards troop acting during state ceremonies and celebrations of the service.

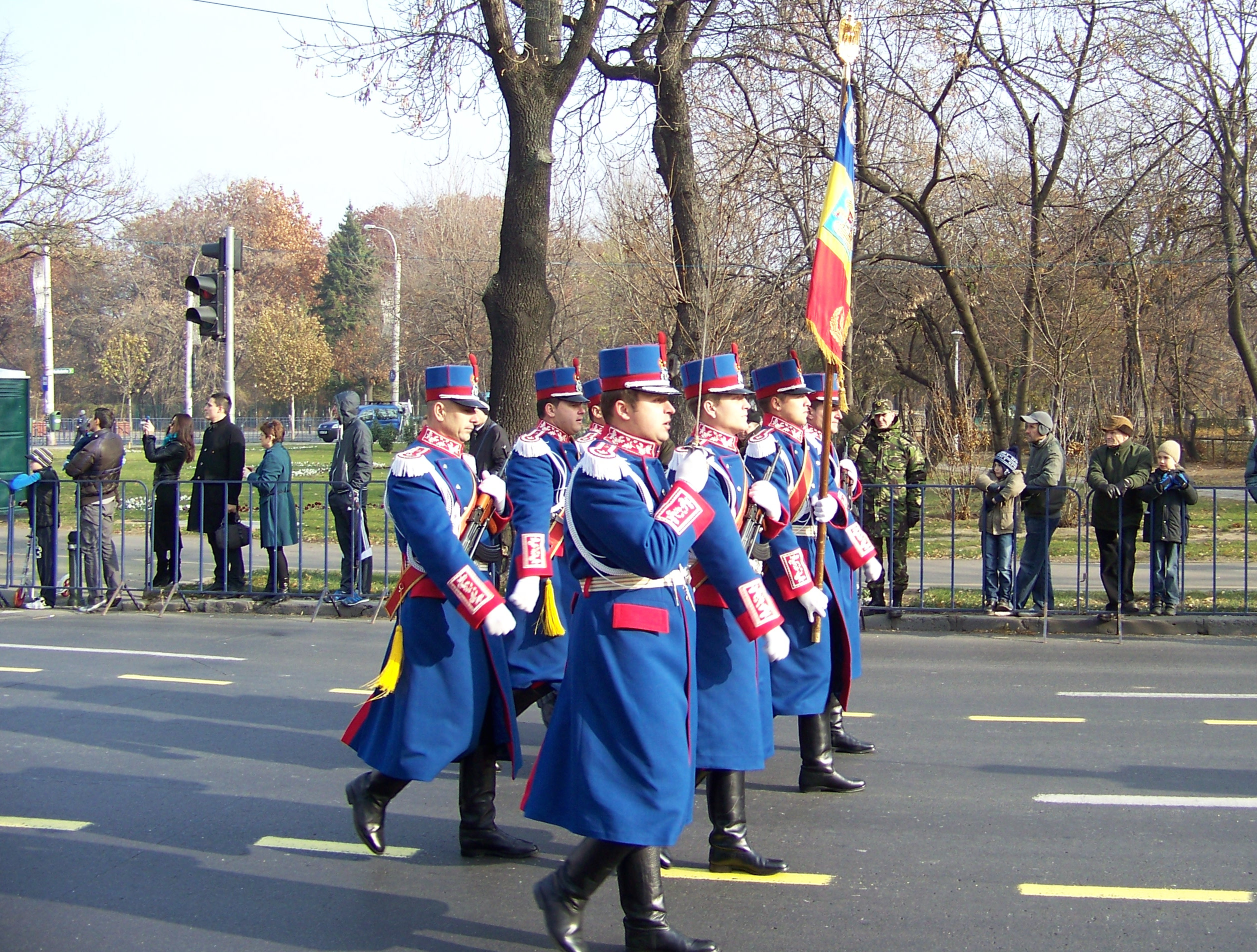
Honour guard of the Romanian Gendarmerie

The first honour guard unit of Romania was established on 1 April 1908 through a royal decree by merging the Bucharest Mounted Gendarmes Divizion with the gendarm squadron from Iași into the Royal Escort Regiment. During King Carol II's rule, over 20 various units of infantry, cavalry, artillery, and an air unit received the title of "guard unit".

In 1931, a Mixed Guard Brigade was also formed, then transformed into the Guards Division two years later. After the communist government took over, all guard units either lost their status or were disbanded. The guard and protocol duties were instead performed by a Republican Guard Regiment from 1948, and from 1968, the 30th Guards Regiment was established within the Romanian People's Army.

==== Russia ====
The Russian Imperial Guards served as honour guards for the Russian Empire for many centuries prior to the February Revolution. Russian honour guards have been considered to have laid out the foundation and model for honour guards in the former Soviet Union, and many of the pioneer guardsmen in these units came from the Imperial Guard, who then taught the first generation of honour guardsmen in ceremonial duties. Russia's primary honour guard (Russian: Почётный караул, Pochotny kara-ul) is the Kremlin Regiment of the Federal Protective Service of the Russian Federation, established in 1936, which is organized into a four battalion regiment, with two battalions designated as guards of honour, one infantry and one cavalry. This regiment is more known for its modern Imperial Guard inspired uniforms, which are worn on more important occasions, these were introduced for the first time in 2004 on the basis of uniforms of the former infantry and cavalry regiments of the Imperial Guards in Saint Petersburg.

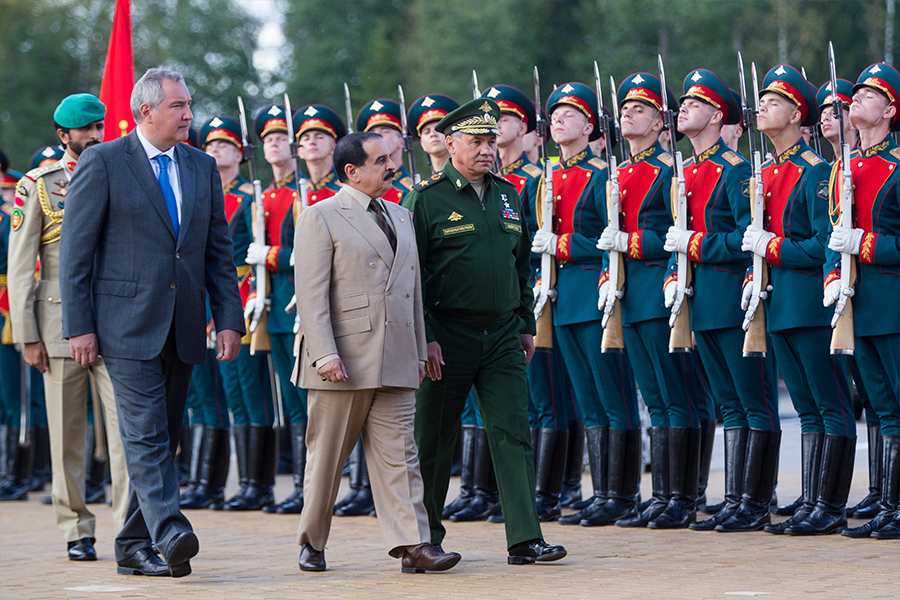
Dignitaries inspect a guard of honour formed by the Russian Armed Forces' 154th Preobrazhensky Independent Commandant's Regiment, 2016

The 154th Preobrazhensky Independent Commandant's Regiment, established in 1979, serves as the official representative honour guard regiment of the Russian Armed Forces and serves as the main honour guard unit of the armed forces. The duties of guards of honour are the responsibility of the 3rd Guard of Honour Battalion, established in 1990. Military districts and fleet formations of the Russian Navy also have their own honour guard companies. All three branches of the Armed Forces, alongside those of other paramilitary formations, maintain their own honour guard companies. Moreover, a large unit could form an honour guard unit on an ad hoc basis. This was applied by the Honour Guard of the Group of Soviet Forces in Germany in the 1960s.

Several military districts of Russian Ground Forces maintain honour guard companies, including the Eastern Military District (formed on 14 December 1971.), the Southern Military District, the Central Military District, and the Western Military District (formed on 20 January 1961 under the command of the 165th Separate Rifle Company). In addition to the honour guard companies of the military districts, the Russian Ground Forces also maintain the Volgograd Honour Guard, a unit of the Southern Military District's 20th Guards Motor Rifle Division.

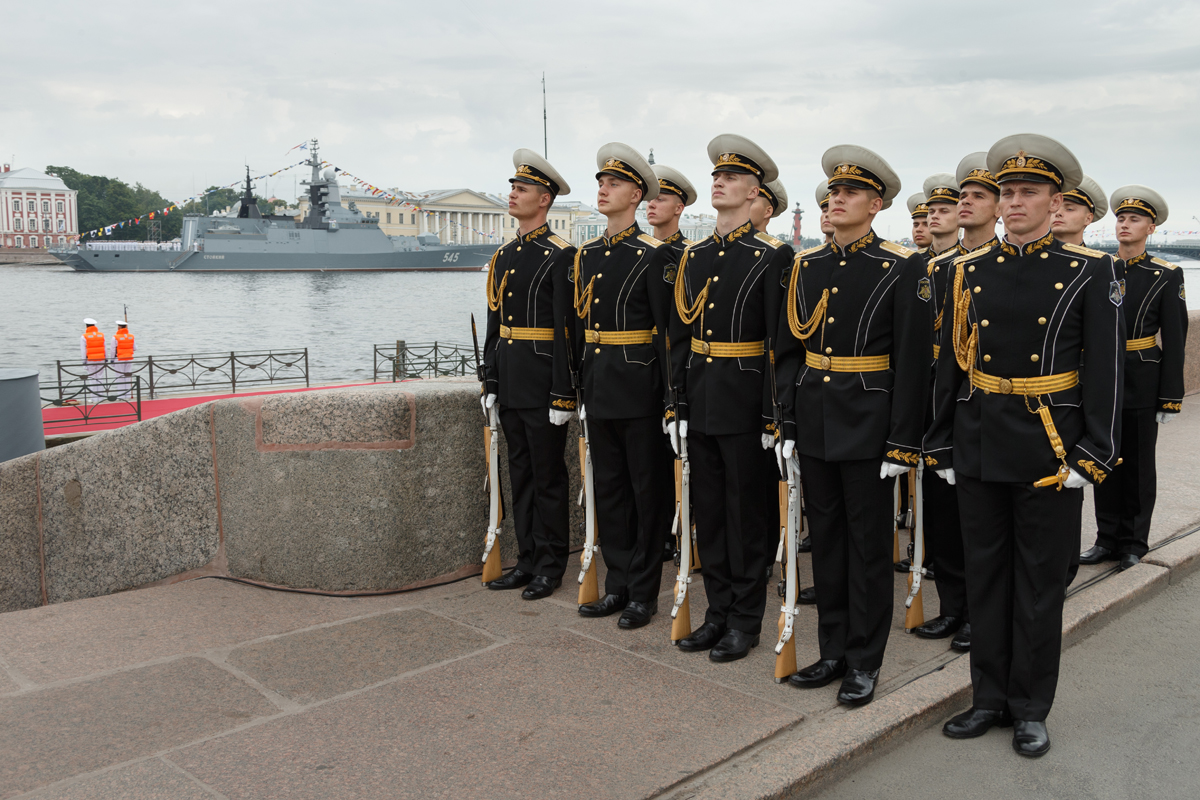
A guard of honour formed by sailors of the Russian Navy during Navy Day commemorations, 2017

The Russian Navy maintains a number of honour guard companies, including the Honour Guard Company of the Russian Navy, which represents the entire service. Other naval honour guard companies include those that represent the Baltic Fleet, Black Sea Fleet, the Northern Fleet, and the Pacific Fleet. The Russian Air Force maintains one guard company, the Honour Guard Company of the Zhukovsky – Gagarin Air Force Academy in Voronezh.

In addition to the Russian Armed Forces, a number of other Russian departments and agencies also maintain their own respective honour guard companies, including the Border Service of the Federal Security Service, Ministry of Emergency Situations, the Ministry of Internal Affairs, and the National Guard of Russia. A female honour guard platoon took part for the first time in a Victory Day Parade in Yekaterinburg in June 2020, wearing a special dress uniform that was tailored by individual standards.

==== San Marino ====
The Most Serene Republic of San Marino maintain a well-organized militia force, mostly used for ceremonial duties. Its foremost honour guard unit is the Guardia del Consiglio Grande e Generale ("Guard of the Great and General Council"), but ceremonial duties are carried also by its other units, the Compagnia Uniformata delle Milizie ("Uniformed Militia Company"), the Guardia di Rocca - Compagnia d'Artiglieria ("Guard of the Rock - Artillery Company") and the Guardia di Rocca - Nucleo Uniformato ("Guard of the Rock - Uniformed Unit").

==== Serbia ====
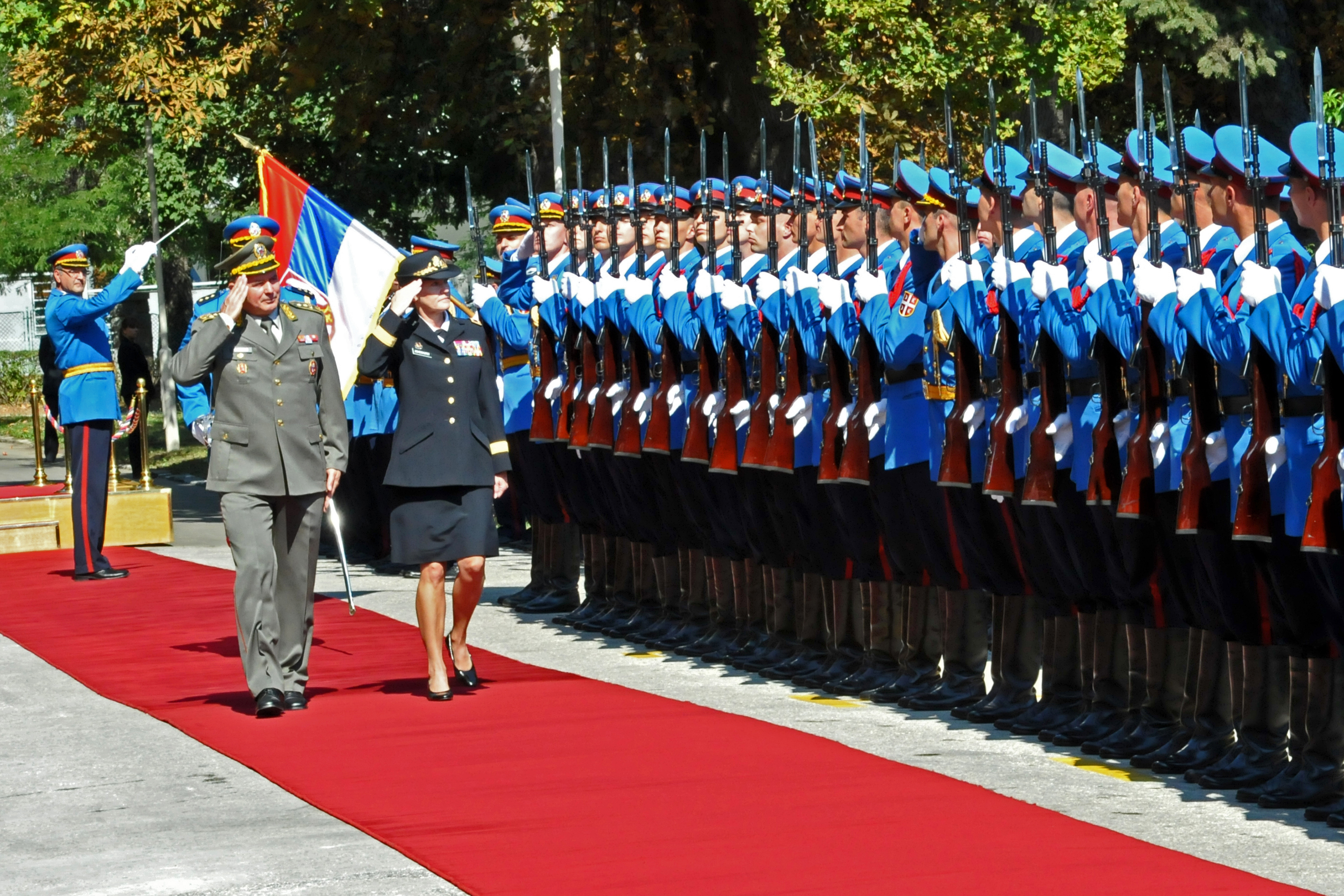
Serbian and Ohioan dignitaries inspect a guard of honour formed by the Guard of the Serbian Armed Forces, 2011

The Guard is an honour guard unit of the Serbian Armed Forces. Brigade-size, it is under the direct command of the General Staff. Its main tasks include guarding vital defence facilities and performing military honours to the highest foreign, domestic, and military officials.

For the needs of Ministry of Defence and the General Staff of the Serbian Armed Forces, the Guard performs tasks within the scope of the military police work and the tasks in the field of security and logistics. Guard continues the tradition of the Guard units which is now almost two centuries long. The first Guard unit formed in Serbia was created on the order of Prince Milos Obrenović on Saint George Day in 1830 in Požarevac. The Guard also sports the official military band of the Serbian Armed Forces, the Band of the Guard.

==== Slovakia ====
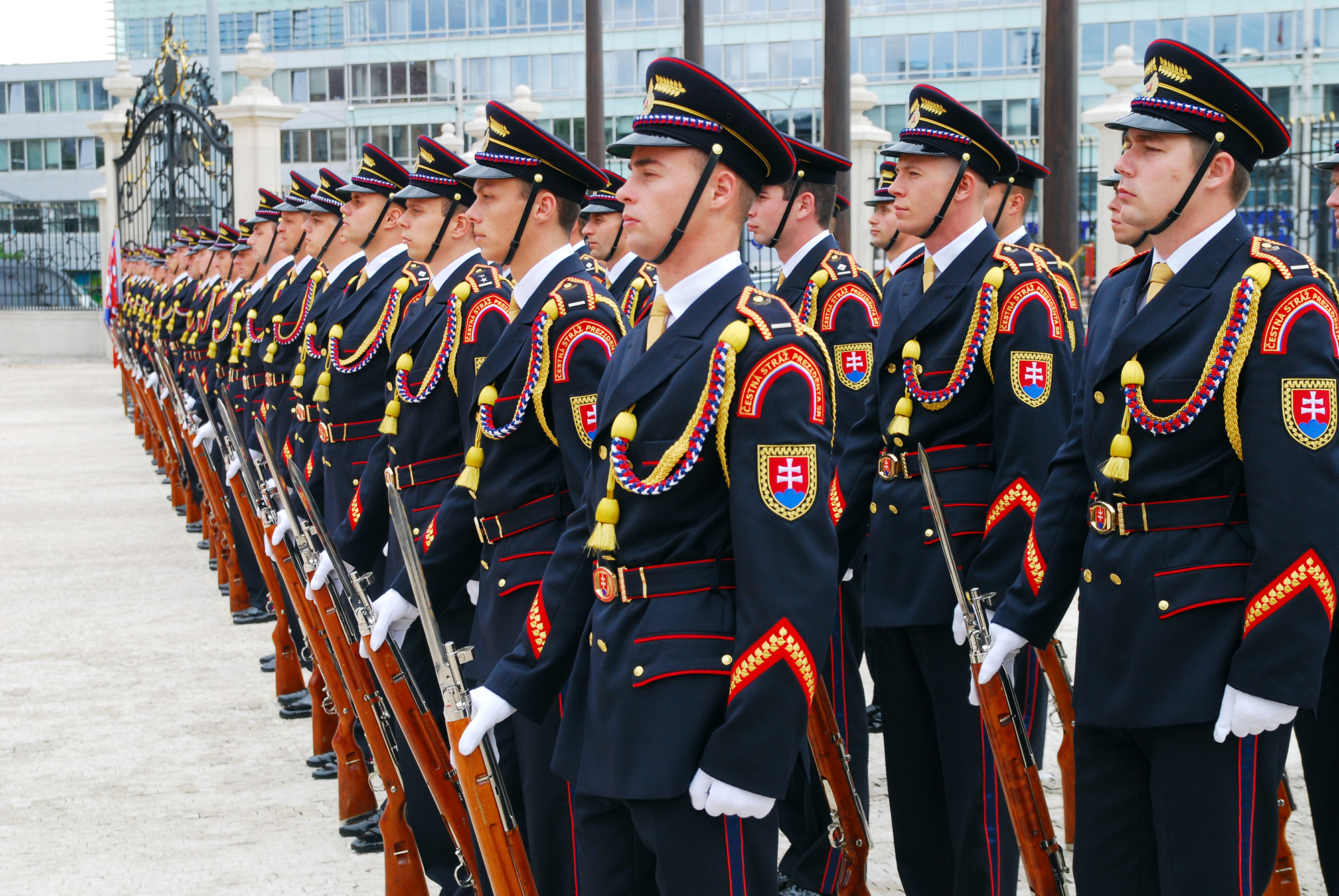
The Slovak Honour Guard of the President during a signing ceremony for an agreement between Slovakia and Ukraine, 2011

The Slovak Armed Forces currently operates two ceremonial guard of honour units. The Honour Guard of the President of the Slovak Republic, also known as the Presidential Guard, is the seniormost ceremonial unit in the Slovak Armed Forces, and the primary honour guard unit of the President of Slovakia. This unit serves under the command of the Military Office of the President of the Slovak Republic.

The Honour Guard Company of the Slovak Armed Forces (Slovak: Čestná stráž Ozbrojených síl Slovenskej republiky, CS OS SR) is a separate ceremonial honour guard unit of the Slovak Armed Forces, under the direct command of the Bratislava Garrison Headquarters. The unit was founded in 2009 as part of reforms in the armed forces. It is responsible for guarding the national symbols of Slovakia (the national flag, for example) in the front lobby of the National Council Building.

==== Spain ====
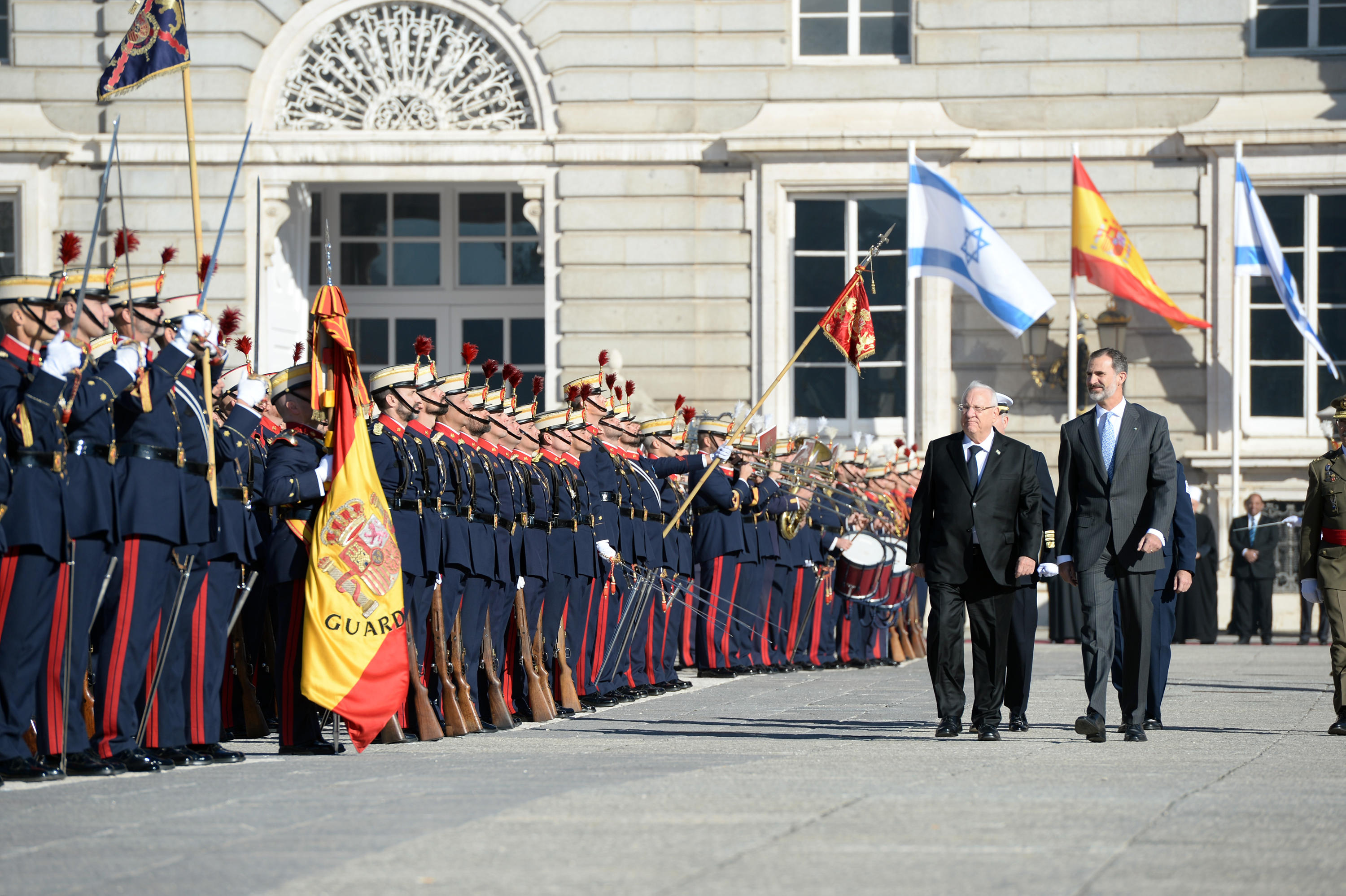
Israeli president Rivlin inspects a guard of honour formed by the Spanish Royal Guard, 2017

The Spanish Royal Guard performs ceremonial and honour guard services in addition to its military bodyguard role and deployment overseas. The regiment's Honour Group and Royal Escort Squadron are its primary ceremonial units. The Royal Escort Squadron provides the ceremonial escort of the Spanish Royal Family and is organized into three units: the Marker Squad, the Cuirassier Troop, and the Lancer Troop.

The guard of honour is also mounted for state visits. Units which mount the guard for state visits include the Spanish Army's Monteros de Espinosa (includes three platoons, and a drill team unit); the Mar Océano Navy and Marine Composite Company (includes three platoons); and the Plus Ultra Air and Space Force Squadron (includes three flights). The 1st King's Immemorial Infantry Regiment maintains a guard of honour unit known as the "Old Guard of Castille" Battalion (Guardias Viejas de Castilla). The Spanish Air and Space Force Honour Squadron (Escuadrilla de Honores del Ejército del Aire) is an independent honour guard the serves the air force. From 1937 to 1956, the Guardia Mora served as the mounted guard of honour for Francoist Spain, part of a bigger combined arms guard of honour regiment of personnel from service branches of the Armed Forces.

==== Sweden ====
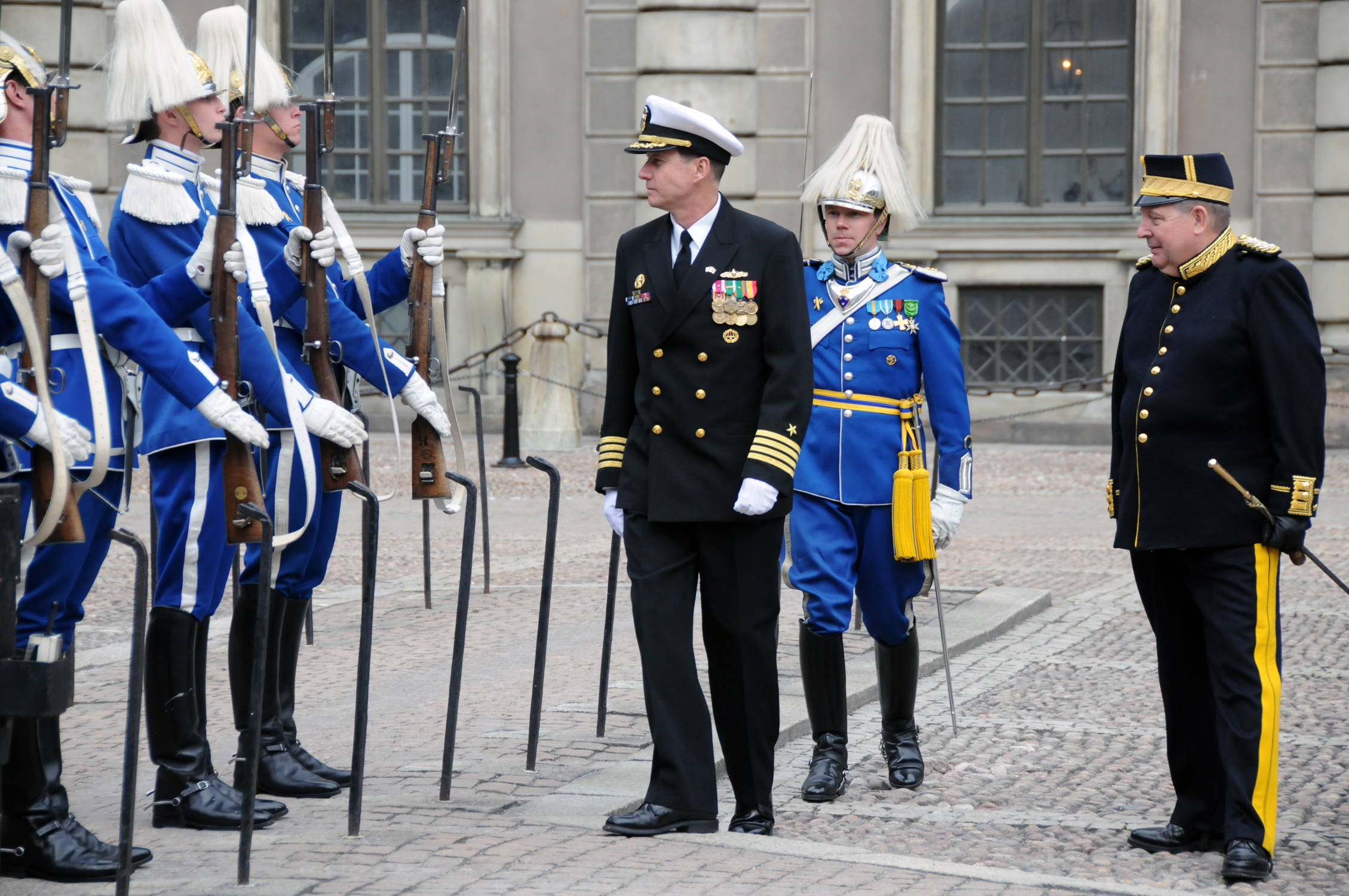
A U.S. Navy Captain inspects a guard of honour formed by Swedish Royal Guards, 2010

Honour guard service is carried out by all units of the Swedish Armed Forces, although the Life Guards Regiment in the Swedish Army accounts for the main part of honour guard services. The Royal Guards (Högvakten) at the Stockholm Palace and the Drottningholm Palace is the honour guard to the King of Sweden. The service is carried out full time by the Life Guards as well as other units of the Swedish Armed Forces including the Home Guard and other voluntary defence organisations.

The Grenadier company of the Life Guards' guard of honour battalion, the Kings' Guards Battalion, is used as an honour guard at state visit welcoming ceremonies. A detachment of grenadiers is also used as honour guard at the opening of the Riksdag, when an incoming foreign ambassador meets with the King at an audience to present letters of credence and when the King attends an annual meeting of one of the Royal Academies.

Drabantvakt ("Royal Bodyguard"), commonly known as Karl XI:s drabanter ("The Bodyguard of Charles XI") and Karl XII:s drabanter ("The Bodyguard of Charles XII") is a ceremonial guard used at state occasions such as state visits, investiture of a monarch, royal weddings and funerals etc. The guard was formed in 1860 based on historical royal bodyguards. The design of the uniforms of the guard is based on, but not identical to, uniforms used during the reign of Carles XI and Charles XII respectively. The guard platoon is made up of 24 guardsmen and one officer selected from the Life Guards' King's Guards Battalion.

==== Switzerland ====
Swiss Armed Forces honour guards are based on the German, French and American model for ceremonial drill. Switzerland does not have a professional honour guard unit. The military instead utilizes a battalion-sized capital unit that is used during official visits. Unlike other European countries, Swiss honour guards wear combat uniforms instead of an expected full dress uniform.

==== Turkey ====
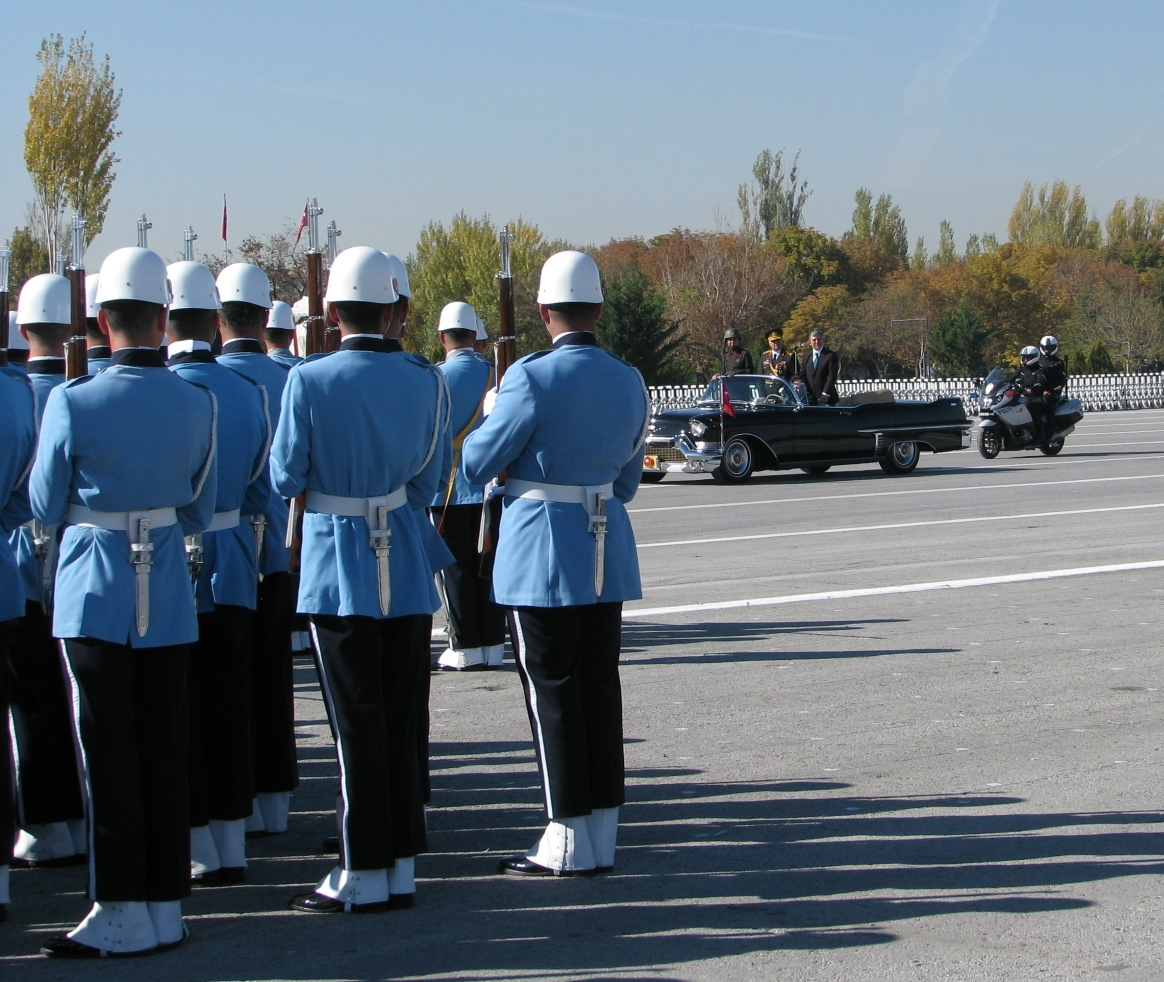
A guard of honour formed by the Turkish Presidential Guard Regiment, as Abdullah Gül, the president of Turkey, drives past, 2013

Several guard detachments operate within the Turkish Armed Forces. A joint service guard of honour company is in service in the Turkish Armed Forces' headquarters in Ankara, composed of select personnel from each service branch of the armed forces performing honour guard and public duties activities. In addition, the Turkish Armed Forces presently operates another ceremonial guard detachment at Anıtkabir, performing public duties at the mausoleum of the first President of Turkey, Mustafa Kemal Atatürk. The standard rifle used by the guard detachment at Anıtkabir is a M1 Garand.

The Presidential Guard Regiment acts as an honour guard regiment for the Turkish Land Forces, a component of the Turkish Armed Forces.

==== Ukraine ====
The Kyiv Honour Guard Battalion, which is part of Hetman Bohdan Khmelnytsky Independent Presidential Guard Brigade, is the official ceremonial guard of honour unit of the Armed Forces of Ukraine. It was formed from the guard of honour units in the Ukrainian SSR's Kiev Military District. Besides the HQ company, the battalion maintains three companies, a Military Band, and a Symbols Protection Company.

The NGU National Special Honour Guard Battalion of the National Guard of Ukraine is actively in use for many ceremonial activities, and was also in service prior to the disbandment of the Internal Troops of Ukraine in 2014.

==== United Kingdom ====
A guard of honour is formed to present formal ceremonial compliments to royal or presidential dignitaries by a guard not exceeding 100 personnel (including three officers, one with a colour) with other particular distinguished individuals saluted by a guard not exceeding 50 personnel. A half guard is a colloquial term describing a guard of honour of not more than 50 personnel (including two officers, one with a colour). A guard of honour could have a single service contingent (e.g. army) or it could be a tri-service (inter-service) affair. The guard commander, after saluting the dignitary (usually head of state), marches to and escorts the dignitary to inspect the guard (soldiers in formation). During the salute, the national anthems of both the dignitary's country and the host country are usually played by a ceremonial band.

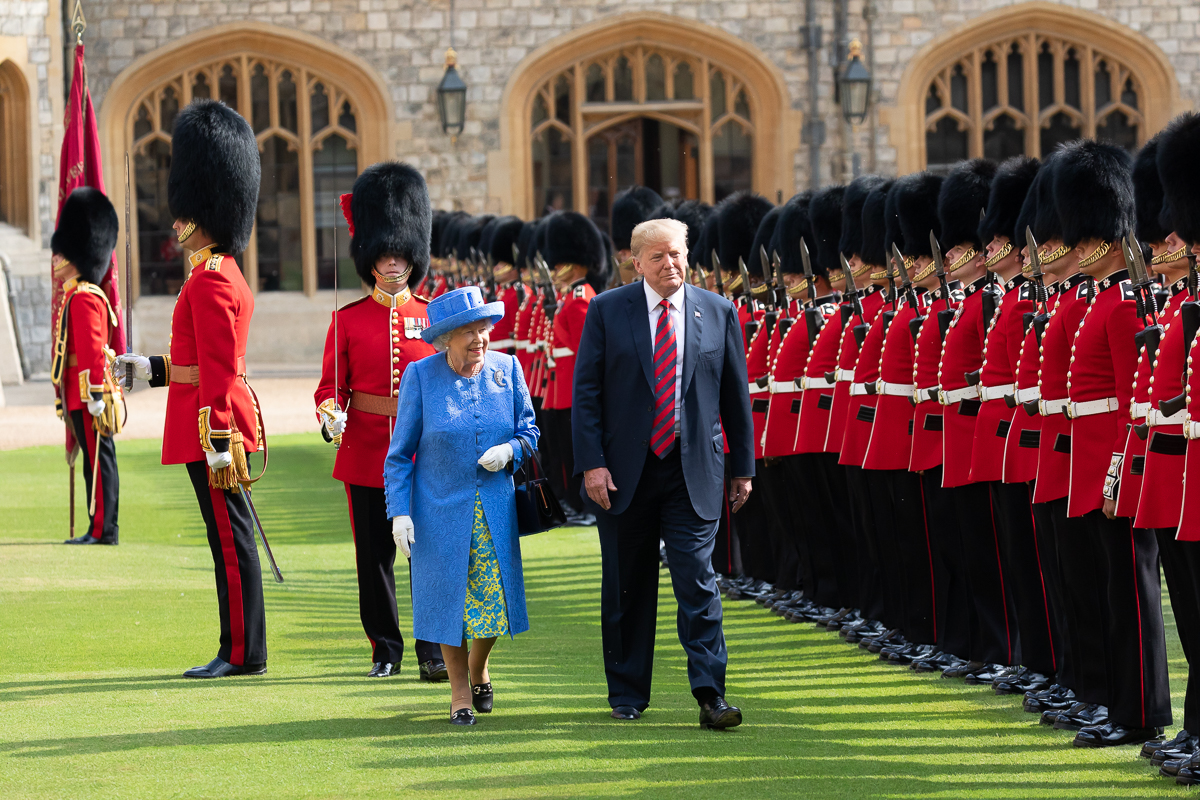
U.S. president Donald Trump inspects a guard of honour formed by the British Coldstream Guards, 2018

Only a standard, guidon, King’s Colour, or a banner presented by either a member of the Royal Family or the governor-general may be carried by a royal guard of honour. Only a regimental colour or a banner presented by a personage other than a member of the Royal Family may be carried on a half guard of honour. A smaller unit honouring distinguished visitors at a military installation is known as a quarter guard. The commander is three paces in front of the second file from the right and accompanies the personage for whom the guard is mounted. An officer carrying the Colour stands three paces in front of the centre; if there is a third officer he will be three paces in front of the second file from the other flank.

Units that traditionally perform ceremonial duties, such as Guard Mounting (changing of the King’s Guard) or Trooping the Colour, are the five regiments of Foot Guards and the Household Cavalry (Blues and Royals and Life Guards), which form the Household Division whilst the Honourable Artillery Company form the Guard of Honour when foreign Heads of State visit London. The Royal Air Force's ceremonial unit is the King's Colour Squadron. The British Armed Forces do not have dedicated ceremonial units other than the King's Troop, Royal Horse Artillery and the Guards and Royal Regiment of Scotland Incremental Companies.

The King's Guard is primarily made up of units from the Household Division for royal palaces and public monuments—namely Buckingham Palace, St James's Palace, Windsor Castle, and the Tower of London—and other units from all three services of the British Armed Forces filling in when not deployed; in Scotland, Holyrood Palace and Edinburgh Castle are usually the responsibility of Scottish regiments or units based in Edinburgh. Occasionally units from Commonwealth militaries are given the honour.

==== Vatican City ====
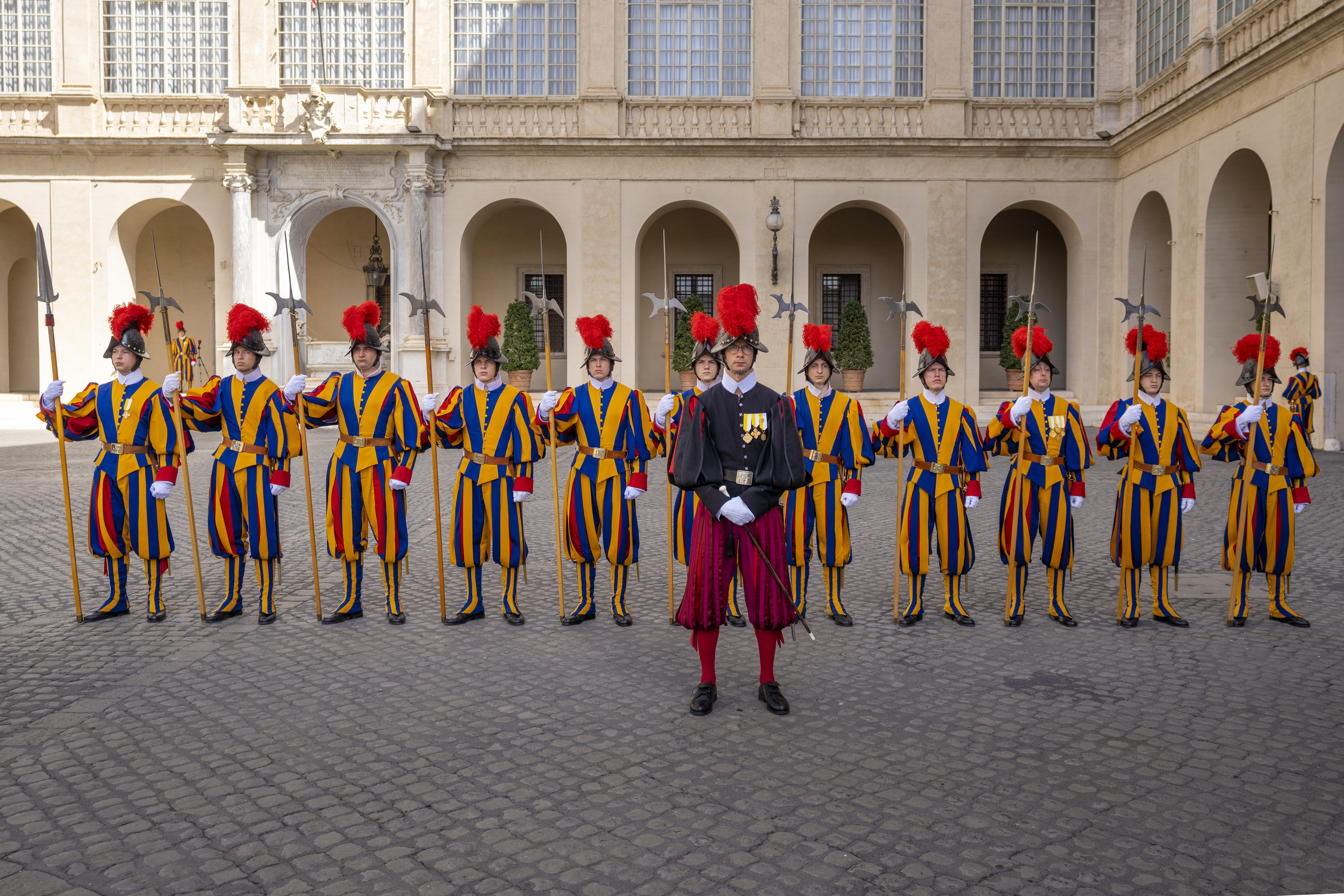
Members of the Swiss Guard during an official visit to Vatican City by U.S. secretary of state Tony Blinken, 2021

The de facto military force of the Vatican City State is the Pontificia Cohors Helvetica ("Papal Swiss Cohort"). Popularly known as the Swiss Guard, this 135 strong unit is formed by unmarried Swiss Catholic former servicemen aged between 19 and 30 years, recruited through a special convention with the Swiss Government. While largely performing ceremonial honour guard duties with traditional weapons (halberds, partisans and swords), the Swiss Guard is also equipped with modern military light weapons and trained in proper military and security duties. The Guard provides one of two official procotol bands in the country.

=== Oceania ===
==== Australia ====
The tri-service Federation Guard – consisting of members of the Australian Army, the Royal Australian Air Force and the Royal Australian Navy – provides the guard of honour for various ceremonies. It is the only military unit of its kind currently in the Australian Defence Force. All members of the guard are enlisted in their respective areas before volunteering for service in the guard. They are armed with L1A1 SLR rifles.

==== Fiji ====
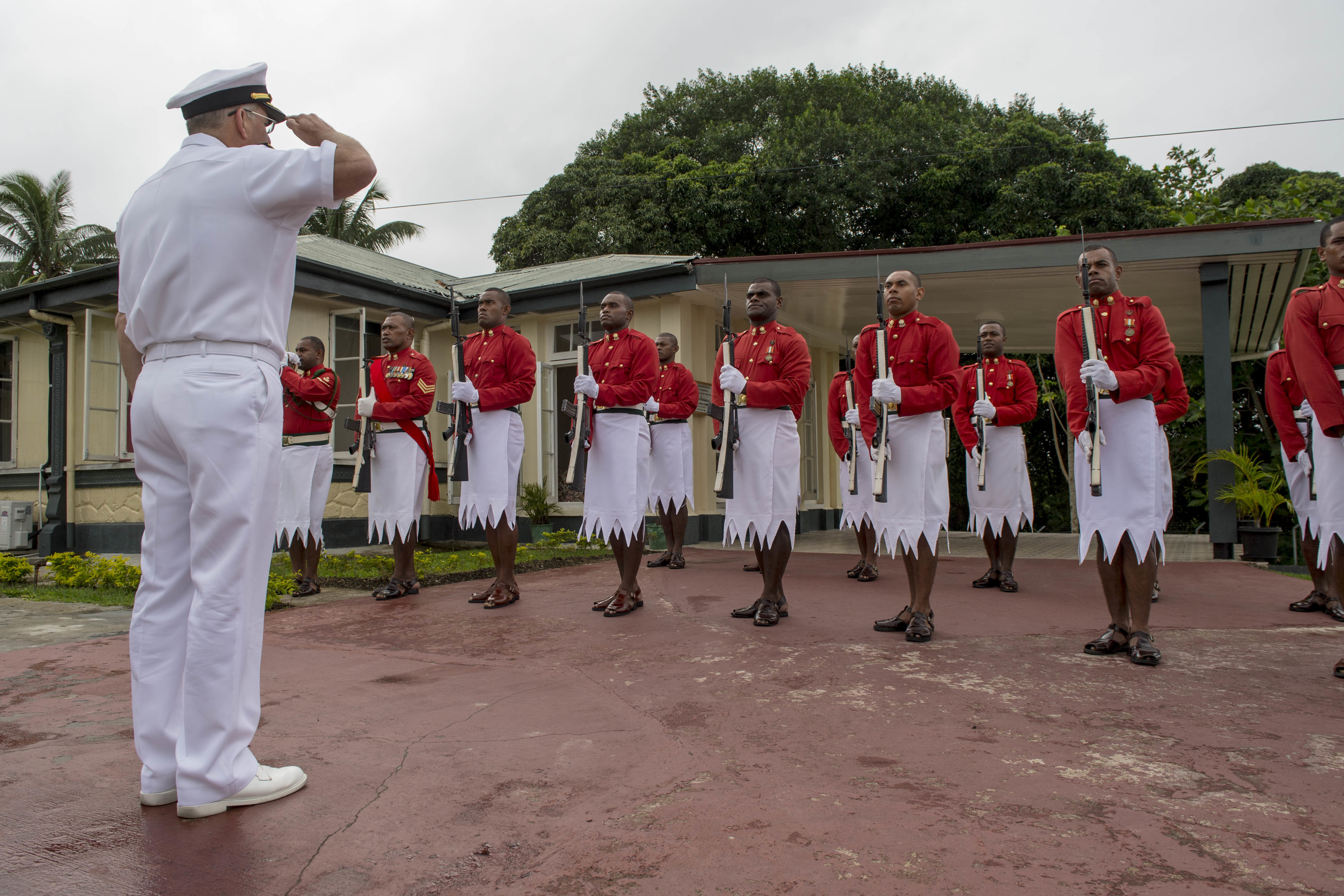
A quarter guard composed of the Fijian Presidential Palace Guards give a presidential salute to leaders of the Pacific Partnership.

Fijian Presidential Palace Guards serve as the official guard of honour unit of the President of Fiji. It is made up of members of all the different service branches of the Fiji Military Forces. It primarily serves its ceremonial duties at the Government House in the capital of Suva. The guards regularly take part in the changing of the guard at the government house. The uniform consists of a Red military shirt and a traditional Fijian Sulu. The guard's main rifle that they carry is the AK-101.

==== New Zealand ====
The New Zealand Defence Force is represented ceremonially by a unit that is known commonly as the Royal Guard of Honour: a company-sized unit (100 members) that is composed of members of the Army, Navy, and Air Force. The company is the official honour guard of the Governor-General, the Prime Minister, the Minister of Defence, and the Chief of Defence Force. The company performs most of its public duties at national events such as the Anzac Day commemorations in the capital. The Army portion of the company is notable for its highly distinctive "lemon squeezer" hat.

== Sports ==
=== Association football ===
In recent years, association football teams have shown their respect to teams in their own division which have already won the championship of the division with games to spare by forming a guard of honour onto or off the pitch for their players, an example of which could be seen in the 2019–20 Premier League season, where champions Liverpool F.C. received guards of honour from Manchester City, Aston Villa, Brighton, Burnley, Arsenal, Chelsea and Newcastle after they claimed the Premier League title with seven games to spare. The applauding team forms two lines to make a corridor and the league winners pass through the corridor, generally in single file.

Occasionally, guards of honour may also be granted for cup winners. An example could be seen at the 2024–25 Premier League match in May 2025 between Liverpool F.C and Crystal Palace F.C. where Liverpool, who had been given a guard of honour by Crystal Palace for having won the Premier League title with 4 matchdays to spare, reciprocated by giving a guard of honour to Crystal Palace, who had won the 2025 FA Cup final a week earlier.

The guard of honour is in some instances considered good form to perform but is not considered compulsory and teams may opt not to provide one, as especially tends to happen between teams considered particularly bitter rivals. For example, Real Madrid CF declined to give bitter rivals FC Barcelona a guard of honour in 2018 when the latter won the league title, and Atlético Madrid declined to give a guard of honour to Real Madrid in 2022 when the latter won the league title, due to the bitter rivalry between the two clubs. Likewise, not returning a guard of honour can also be seen as disgraceful; in the post-match ceremony of the 2026 FIFA World Cup final, newly-crowned champions Spain gave runners-up Argentina, who were the defending World Cup champions, a guard of honour when the latter accepted their silver medals, but Argentina refused to return the favour for Spain, standing on the far side of the pitch facing their fans with their backs turned towards Spain when they accepted their gold medals and the trophy.

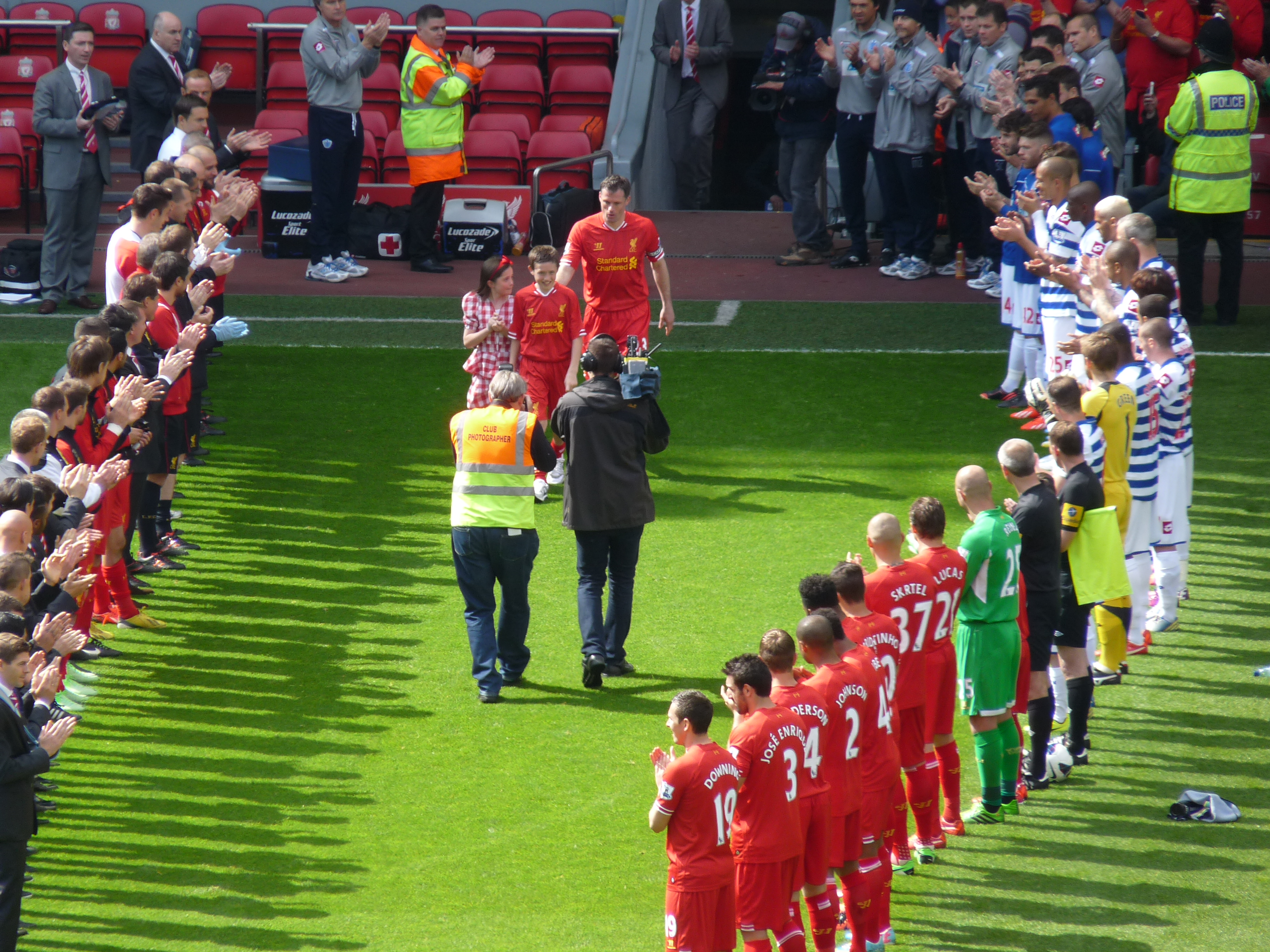
Jamie Carragher receives a guard of honour before the final match of his career

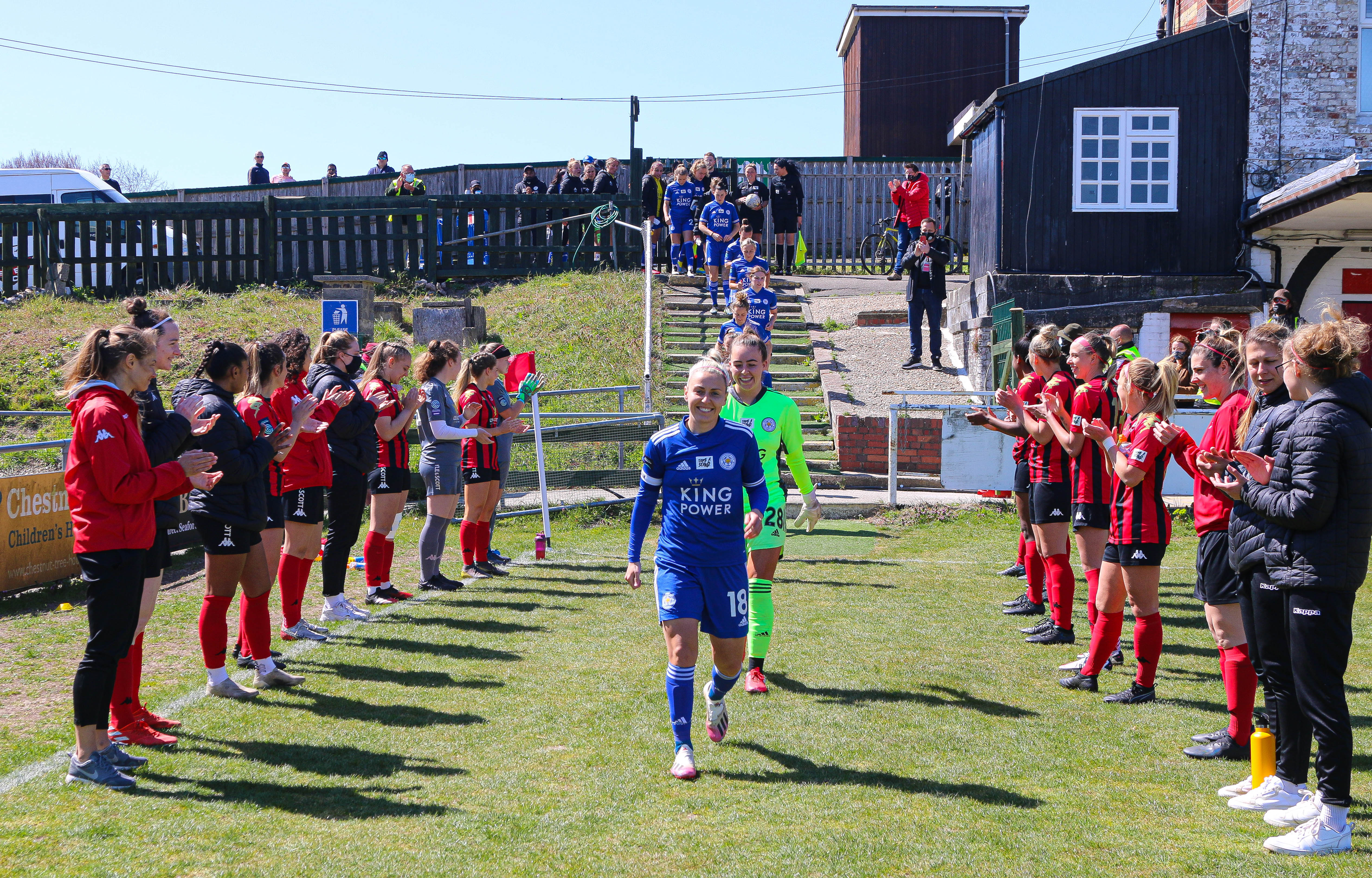
Leicester City W.F.C. players receives a guard of honour for clinching the 2020–21 FA Women's Championship title

Examples of guards of honour in association football

The same has occasionally been done for individual players meeting particularly momentous points in their career, such as when Scottish Premier league team Rangers squad did so for departing talisman Dado Pršo and Chelsea controversially chose to do so in a pre-planned display in the middle of a match for John Terry's last game, causing significant delays to the game.

=== Australian rules football ===
In Australian rules football, players will often form a guard of honour for those who are leaving the field after a landmark game or on their retirement game. For example, Fremantle formed a guard of honour for Fitzroy's last match in 1996; Melbourne and Essendon formed a guard in 2005 to honour Indian Ocean tsunami victim Troy Broadbridge; and Collingwood and North Melbourne formed a guard of honour in 2006 for retiring player Saverio Rocca, who forged a successful goalkicking career at both clubs. After playing in the Auskick games at half time of senior matches, the junior players line up to form a guard of honour for when the players return to the field.

=== Cricket ===
In cricket, the guard of honour is used to celebrate the achievement of a player (usually as a batsman), normally used during a player's final game. The players' teammates or opposition form a cordon, with their bats at the second count of the draw sabre forming an arch, and the successful player walks through. It may also be performed to mark a milestone, such as when a player breaks a world record. A player can receive guard of honour multiple times as they retire from different forms of the game separately. When a bowler retires, it would generally be when they leave the field for the final time, or when they play their final match in a certain venue of importance (away match, home ground, retiring on the same day a ground is due to be demolished).

=== Field hockey ===
In recent times guard of honour is usually done among hockey players for those who have done something valuable for their country like Balbir Singh Sr or Jamie Dwyer.

== See also ==
- Change of command
- Colour guard
- Military rites
- Vigil of the Princes
