= Peterson Space Force Base =

US Space Force base in Colorado Springs, Colorado, United States

- Colorado Springs, Colorado in United States
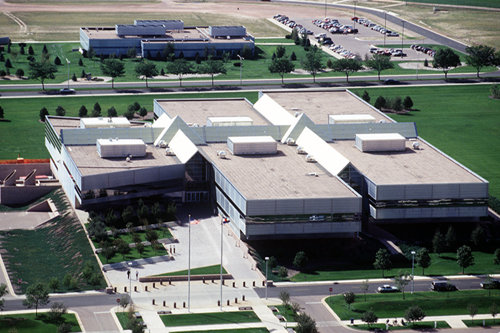
- Peterson SFB's Hartinger Building which is the headquarters of Space Operations Command and United States Space Command.

- Shield of Space Base Delta 1

Site information
- Type: U.S. Space Force base
- Owner: Department of Defense
- Operator: United States Space Force
- Controlled by: Space Base Delta 1
- Condition: Operational
- Website: www.peterson.spaceforce.mil

Location
- Location within Colorado Location within the United States Location within North America
- Coordinates: 38°49′25″N 104°41′42″W

Site history
- Built: 1942
- In use: 1942 – present

Garrison information
- Current commander: Col Zachary S. Warakomski
- Past commanders: Col James E. Smith
- Garrison: Space Base Delta 1 (Host)

Airfield information
- Identifiers: IATA: COS, ICAO: KCOS, FAA LID: COS, WMO: 724660
- Elevation: 1,885.7 m (6,187 ft) AMSL
Runways
Direction	Length and surface
17L/35R	4,114.8 m (13,500 ft) Concrete
17R/35L	3,359.5 m (11,022 ft) Asphalt
13/31	2,520.7 m (8,270 ft) Asphalt
- Airfield shared with Colorado Springs Airport; Source: Federal Aviation Administration

Peterson Space Force Base, previously Peterson Air Force Base, Peterson Field, and Army Air Base, Colorado Springs, is a United States Space Force base that shares an airfield with the adjacent Colorado Springs Municipal Airport and is home to the North American Aerospace Defense Command (NORAD), the Space Force's Space Base Delta 1, elements of the Space Force's Space Systems Command, and United States Northern Command (USNORTHCOM) headquarters. Developed as a World War II air support base for Camp Carson, the facility conducted Army Air Forces training and supported Cold War air defense centers at the nearby Ent Air Force Base, Chidlaw Building, and Cheyenne Mountain Complex. The base was the location of the Air Force Space Command headquarters from 1987 to 20 December 2019 and has had NORAD/NORTHCOM command center operations since the 2006 Cheyenne Mountain Realignment placed the nearby Cheyenne Mountain Complex on standby. On 26 July 2021, the installation was renamed Peterson Space Force Base to reflect its prominent role in the new space service.

== History ==
Colorado military construction during the buildup of US training installations prior to the bombing of Pearl Harbor included the 1940 Lowry bombardier school at Denver and Camp Carson south of Colorado Springs (HQ completed on 31 January 1942). Sites "in the vicinity of Colorado Springs" were assessed in the summer of 1941 for a USAAF airfield, and during April 1942 the Photographic Reconnaissance Operational Training Unit (PROTU) was activated in a leased facility at Colorado Springs. On 6 May 1942, the site adjacent to the airfield of the 1926 Colorado Springs Municipal Airport was selected, and the airport's airfield was subsequently leased as an "air support field"* for Camp Carson under the "air support base development program". In May 1942, units such as the 5th Mapping Squadron (from Bradley Field) arrived and used city facilities. The "Second Photographic Group Reconnaissance" (activated 7 May 1942 at Will Rogers Field) transferred to Colorado Springs, and the "2nd Group ... headquarters was situated in a former garage across the street from the Post Office, barracks were in the city auditorium ... and the mess hall was located at the busy horseshoe counter of the Santa Fe railway station." Land at the Broadmoor was used for maneuvers, and the 2nd Group initially operated without aircraft. Personnel were also "housed temporarily at Colorado College" and a youth camp near the Woodmen sanitorium. (the 14th Photographic Reconnaissance Squadron was located at the Kaufman Building on Tejon St.)

=== Army Air Base, Colorado Springs ===
"Army Air Base, Colorado Springs",* construction began after 10 May 1942, on "nothing more than a large patch of Colorado plain", and the installation was placed under the Headquarters, United States "AAF [on] 11 June 1942". The 373d Base HQ and Air Base Sq was activated as the base operating unit on 20 June 1942 (replaced by the 214th AAF Base Unit in 1944), and the base was assigned to the 2nd Air Force on 22 June 1942. On 7 July 1942, "HQ PROTU" was on the "Army Air Base, Colorado Springs" and was ordered to provide "four to five months of training to each individual". During air base construction, the 20th Combat Mapping Squadron was activated on 23 July 1942, and used the Alamo Garage on Tejon Street. Runways were completed in August 1942, and eponym 1st Lt Edward J. Peterson crashed 8 August 1942 on take off (1st Coloradoan killed at the airfield.)

=== Peterson Field ===
Peterson Field was the airfield named on 13 December 1942, and included the runway used by both the municipal airport and the military installation: "Army Air Base, Peterson Field", which had begun publishing the Wingspread base newspaper by 11 July 1942. The "18 Dep Rpr Sq" was assigned to the military installation from 19 January – 29 April 1943, and the installation was assigned to the Third Air Force (5 March – 1 October 1943) and by the end of the 1943 summer had tar paper barracks, an officer's club, and a theater in a Quonset. After the base transferred to Second Air Force on 1 October 1943, in June 1944 Peterson Field began fighter pilot training with P-40N Warhawks. "In March 1943 the Third Air Force took over the photographic reconnaissance Operational Training Unit which had been operating at Peterson Field ... under the direct control of the Director of Photography since April 1942".

=== Bomber Commands ===
The 4th Heavy Bombardment Processing Headquarters ("4 H Bomb Processing HQ") was activated on 10 June 1943 (the 1st B-29 landed at Peterson Field in the summer of 1943), and bomber training by the 214th AAF Base Unit (Combat Crew Training School, Heavy) B-24 Liberator) began after the 383rd Bombardment Group relocated from Geiger Field, Washington on 26 October 1943. In 1944 (11 June – 20 October), the XXI Bomber Command was assigned to Peterson; and the "HQ and HQ Sq" of XXII Bomber Command was assigned 14 October 1944 – 13 February 1945, and by 17 August 1944, 4 bomb wings (313th through 316th) were assigned to the base — the last left on 7 June 1945. The 263rd AAF Base Unit became the Peterson "base operating unit" on 8 March 1945 (transferred to Andrews Field on 17 March 1946). The Army Air Forces Instructor School opened at Peterson Field in April 1945, and the base was one of several that transferred to Continental Air Forces on 16 April 1945. (VIII Bomber Command arrived 17 August 1945).

The base was inactivated 31 December 1945 after the 13th Bombardment Wing (17 October) and VIII Bomber Command (c. 15 December) departed, and site management by the base operating unit ended on 17 December 1945. In 1946, Peterson's last AAF Base Units were discontinued: 260th AAF Base Unit (Fighter Wing) in January, the 202nd AAF Base Unit (Special) in February, and the 268th AAF Base Unit (Instrument Instructor Unit) in March and the 201st (Headquarters Base Unit) in April (the 72nd Fighter Wing was at the base from "4 January 1946 - 9 April 1946"). The 703rd AAF Base Unit (Hq, 53d AACS Group) moved to Kelly Field in February. Designated surplus on 29 July 1946, "the U.S. Government returned control of the [air]field to the City of Colorado Springs". Many of the base buildings were torn down. In 1946, Tonopah AAF (Nevada, on 1 October), Clovis AAF (New Mexico, 16 October), and Casper AAF (Wyoming, on 15 December) became detached installations of the inactive base for a short period.

During planning for the new United States Air Force, Colorado's Arlington Auxiliary Army Airfield became a detached installation of the surplus base (1 January – c. 10 October 1947), and the "468th Construction Co (15th AF)" became the inactive base's operating unit in February 1947. The base with new construction was activated 29 September 1947 – 15 January 1948, then was "surplus" until after the notice in November 1950 to reactivate Air Defense Command. The "23 Photo Sq 19 May 1943-9 August 1948" remained throughout both inactive/surplus periods, and the "4600 Maint & Sup Sq" was established at the surplus base on 1 December 1950).

=== USAF installation ===
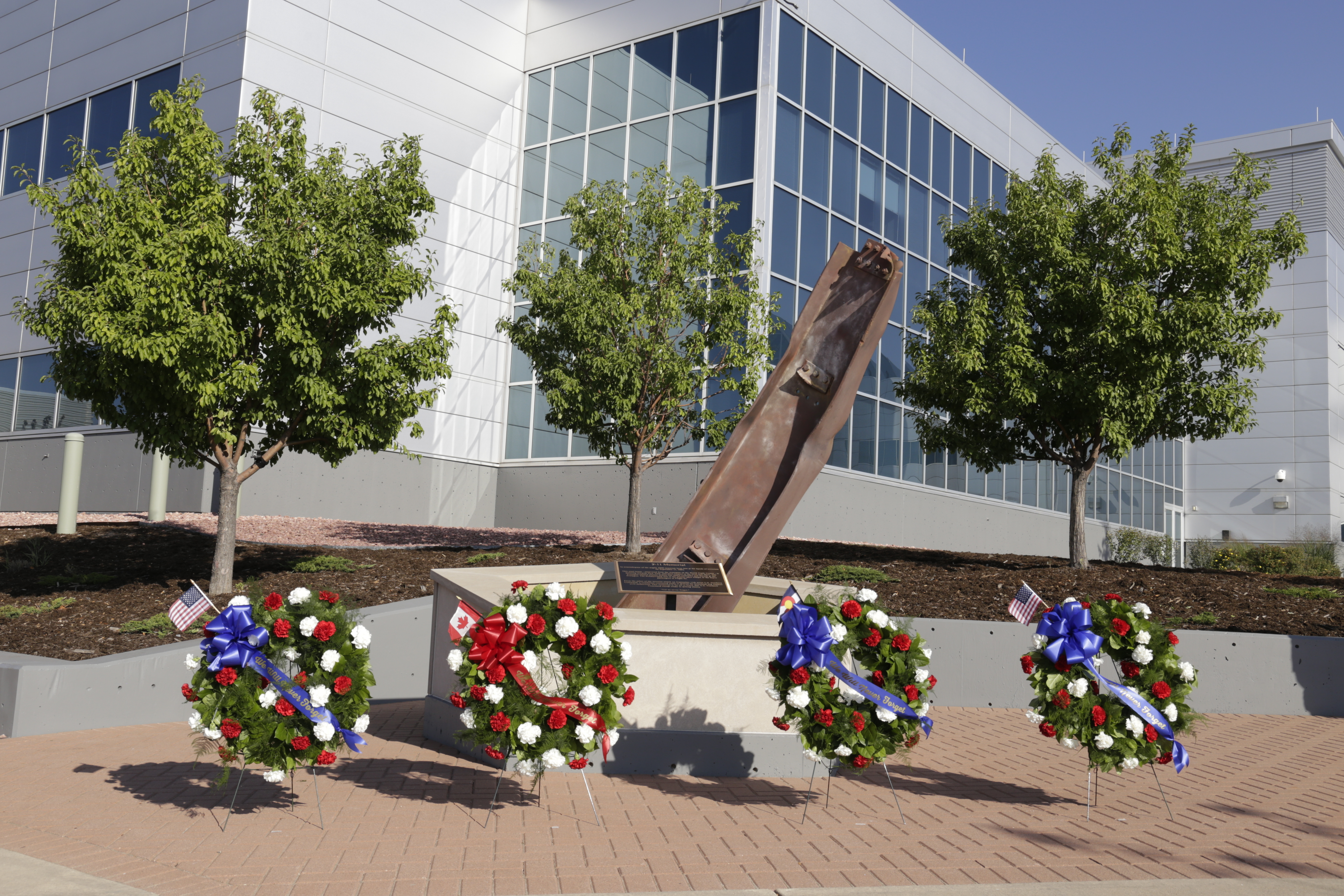
The 9/11 memorial at Peterson as it appears after the 20th anniversary commemoration of the event, with wreaths laid, on September 11, 2021.

The military base at the municipal field reactivated as an off-base installation of Ent Air Force Base on 1 January 1951 and was operated by Ent's 4600 Air Base Group. After being assigned to Peterson on 1 March 1952, the 4602d Air Intelligence Service Squadron had subordinate organizations at the "Defense Force Headquarters [on] Hamilton Air Force Base, California, at Kansas City, Missouri, and at Stewart Air Force Base" New York. The 4600th Group became the 4600th Air Base Wing on 8 April 1958 (moved to Peterson on 18 October 1972). The 4600th was replaced by the 46th Aerospace Defense Wing on 1 April 1975. In January 1968, Air Training Command's 3253d Pilot Training Squadron at Peterson Field began light aircraft indoctrination for cadets. These operations moved to the United States Air Force Academy on 21 March 1974. The military base at Peterson Field gained its own base commander on 28 February 1975.

=== Primary installation ===
External image
- Peterson.AF.mil gallery
- JFK's Air Force One at Peterson during 1963 Chidlaw Building/Cheyenne Mountain visit
- MAFFS aircraft at PAFB

Designated Peterson Air Force Base on 1 March 1975, when Ent AFB was being closed, Peterson was the last of the April 1945 Continental Air Forces airbases to be named an air force base. Also on 1 March, Peterson assumed several functions from Ent AFB, which became the "Ent Annex" of Peterson, 18 July 1975 – 7 February 1978 (Peterson's off-base "Temporary Military Facility" was opened for space training by 1986). During the first part of the reorganization that broke up ADCOM, the base "transferred to the Strategic Air Command" on 1 October 1979 (units transferred included the 47th Comm Sq to AFCS and the 46th Wing and 4602nd Computer Services Sq to SAC). ADCOM HQ offices at the Chidlaw Building became the Aerospace Defense Center at Peterson on 1 December 1979.

Peterson's NORAD COC Backup Facility achieved Full Operational Capability on 16 November 1982 from the Cheyenne Mountain Complex which was placed on warm standby.

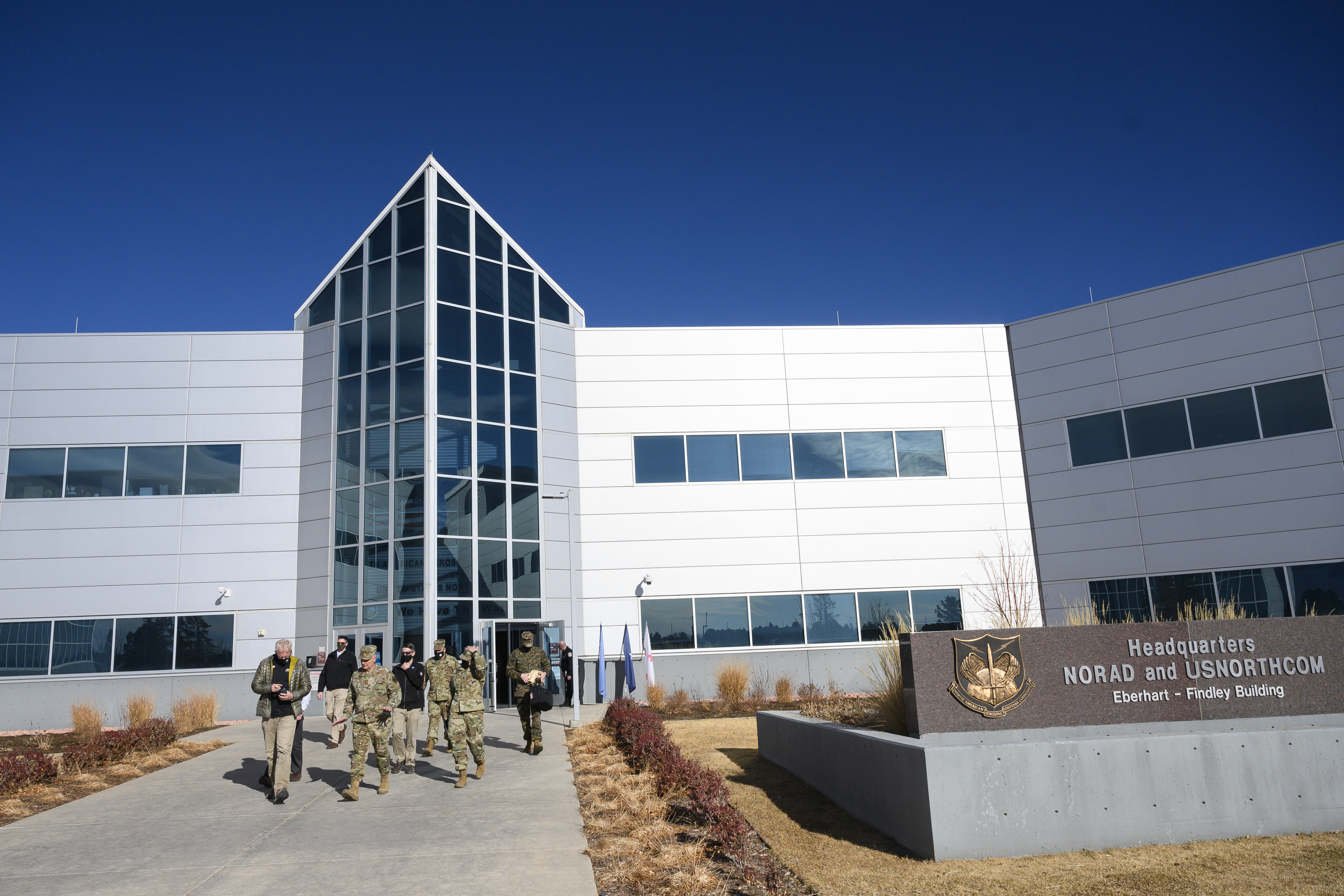
NORAD-USNORTHCOM headquarters at the Eberhart-Findley Building

The 1st Space Wing replaced the 46th Aerospace Defense Wing on 1 April 1983. Thereafter the 1st Space Wing transferred host unit responsibility to the 3d Space Support Wing activated on 15 October 1986. Army and other units transferred from the former Ent AFB Federal Building to Peterson Building 2 (renamed the Eberhart-Findley Building in October 2012). On 15 May 1992, the personnel and equipment of both the 1st SW and 3d SSW merged to become the 21st Space Wing. Peterson's Space Analysis Center was at the corner of Academy & Fountain Blvds by 2004 before moving on base to bldg 1470, and in 2004 the Space Operations School used a building along I-25 at Woodmen Drive.

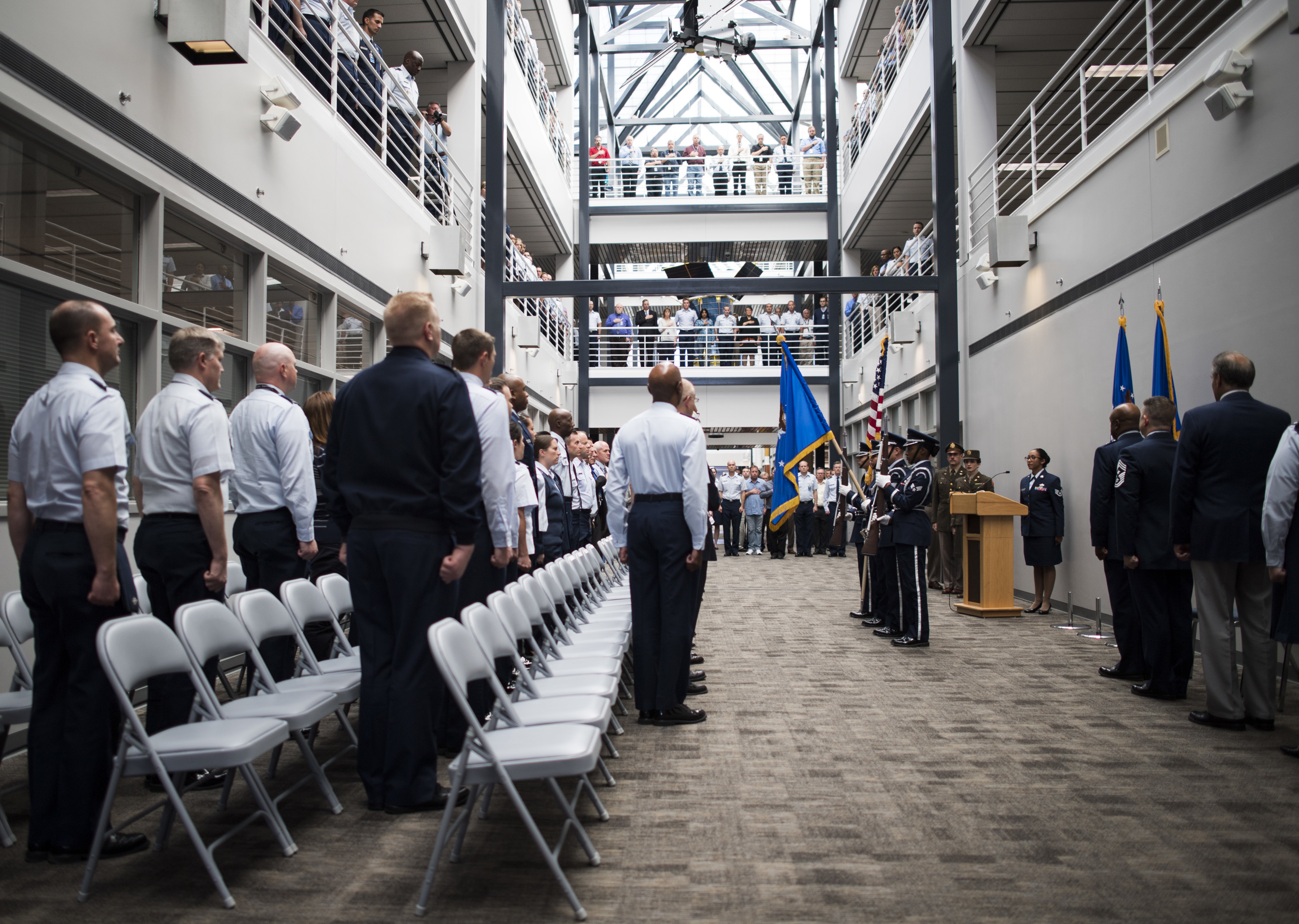
Members of the Peterson AFB High Frontier Honor Guard Posting the Colours at the Air Force birthday ceremony, September 2016.

The Cheyenne Mountain Realignment moved NORAD/USNORTHCOM operations to Peterson AFB in 2006. In 2006, the 76th Space Control Facility was constructed at Peterson (the squadron activated 22 January 2008). The MAFFS aircraft that fought the 2012 Waldo Canyon fire and 2013 Black Forest fire at Colorado Springs flew from Peterson AFB.

Some buildings from the Second World War have survived. Buildings remaining in 1996 were "the terminal, now the Peterson Air and Space Museum, the Broadmoor hangar, and the Spanish House" next to the museum, along with Building 391, Building 365, supply warehouses and office buildings, and aircraft hangars and maintenance shops.

The base's Retiree Activities Office has the representative for the Air Force Retiree Council Area IV (Colorado, Nevada, Utah, and Wyoming).

On 20 December 2019, Air Force Space Command was redesignated as the U.S. Space Force and elevated to become an independent military branch. With the new military branch, the Fourteenth Air Force and its units became Space Force Space Operations Command and Air Force Space Command's headquarters was redesignated as the Pentagon.

== Based units ==
Flying and notable non-flying units based at Peterson Space Force Base.

Units marked GSU are Geographically Separate Units, which although based at Peterson, are subordinate to a parent unit based at another location.

=== United States Space Force (USSF) ===
Space Base Delta 1

- 21st Medical Group
  - 21st Aerospace Medicine Squadron
  - 21st Dental Squadron
  - 21st Medical Operations Squadron
  - 21st Medical Squadron
  - 21st Medical Support Squadron
- 21st Mission Support Group
  - 21st Civil Engineer Squadron
  - 21st Communications Squadron
  - 21st Contracting Squadron
  - 21st Force Support Squadron
  - 21st Logistics Readiness Squadron
  - 21st Security Forces Squadron

United States Space Force Combat Forces Command (CFC)

- Mission Delta 2
- Mission Delta 3
  - 4th Electromagnetic Warfare Squadron
  - 5th Electromagnetic Warfare Squadron
  - 16th Electromagnetic Warfare Squadron
  - Space Delta 3 Operations Support Squadron
- Space Delta 7
  - 71st Intelligence, Surveillance, and Reconnaissance Squadron
  - 72nd Intelligence, Surveillance, and Reconnaissance Squadron

Space Systems Command (SSC)

- Space Logistics Directorate (GSU)
- Range and Network Division (GSU)

United States Space Forces – Northern

=== United States Army ===
US Army Space & Missile Defense Command / Army Forces Strategic Command (USASMDC / ARSTRAT)

- 1st Space Brigade
  - 1st Space Battalion
  - 2nd Space Battalion
  - 53rd Signal Battalion (Satellite Control)
    - Headquarters 53rd Signal Battalion (Satellite Control)
- Regional SATCOM Support Center West

=== Department of Defense ===
North American Aerospace Defense Command (NORAD)

- Headquarters North American Aerospace Defense Command
- NORAD and USNORTHCOM Command Center

United States Northern Command (USNORTHCOM)

- Headquarters United States Northern Command
- NORAD and USNORTHCOM Command Center

=== United States Air Force (USAF) ===
Air Combat Command (ACC)

- Sixteenth Air Force (Air Forces Cyber)
  - 690th Cyberspace Operations Group
    - 561st Network Operations Squadron (GSU)

Air Mobility Command (AMC)

- Eighteenth Air Force
  - 19th Airlift Wing
    - 19th Operations Group
      - 52nd Airlift Squadron (GSU) – C-130H Hercules

Air Force Reserve Command (AFRC)

- Tenth Air Force
  - 310th Space Wing
    - 710th Operations Group
      - 380th Space Control Squadron (GSU)
      - 428th Electromagnetic Warfare Flight
- Twenty-Second Air Force
  - 302nd Airlift Wing
    - 302nd Operations Group
      - 34th Aeromedical Evacuation Squadron
      - 302nd Operations Support Squadron
      - 731st Airlift Squadron – C-130H Hercules
    - 302nd Maintenance Group
      - 302nd Maintenance Squadron
      - 302nd Aircraft Maintenance Squadron
    - 302nd Mission Support Group
    - 39th Aerial Port Squadron
    - 302nd Civil Engineer Squadron
    - 302nd Communications Flight
    - 302nd Force Support Squadron
    - 302nd Logistics Readiness Squadron
    - 302nd Security Forces Squadron
  - 302nd Aeromedical Staging Squadron

Air National Guard

- Colorado Air National Guard
  - 140th Wing
    - 140th Operations Group
      - 138th Electromagnetic Warfare Squadron
      - 200th Airlift Squadron (GSU) – C-21A Learjet

=== Road ===
Peterson Road in Colorado Springs is named after Peterson Base and starts at Peterson Base and ends at a fire station near Dublin Blvd. It intersects with Hwy 24, Galley Rd, Palmer Park Blvd, Constitution Ave, N. Carefree Cir, Barnes Rd, Stetson Hills Blvd, and Dublin Blvd. There is currently road work at the interchange at Peterson Rd and Hwy 24. Peterson runs parallel to Colorado State Highway 21/N. Powers Blvd and Marksheffel Rd.
