= United States Space Force Honor Guard =

- Founded: 2024 to present
- Country: United States
- Branch: United States Space Force
- Type: Honor Guard
- Role: Public Duties
- Size: 43 personnel
- Part of: Headquarters Space Force
- Headquarters: Washington D.C., U.S.

The United States Space Force Honor Guard is the official ceremonial unit of the United States Space Force and is assigned to Joint Base Anacostia-Bolling, Washington D.C. The Honor Guard's primary mission is to represent the U.S. Space Force at all public and official ceremonies within the National Capital Region and abroad when directed by the Military District of Washington.

== History ==
=== Raising of the unit ===
On 30 August 2023, the Space Force enlisted 16 new cadre members to stand up the unit. It immediately began representing the USSF at the Chief Master Sergeant of the Space Force's Change of Responsibility on 15 September.

=== First activities ===
It participated in its first public duty, the State funeral of Jimmy Carter, in early January 2025. It marched in the second inauguration parade of Donald Trump held on 20 January.

== Duties ==
The United States Space Force Honor Guard provides along with ceremonial honour guards from the Army, Marine Corps, Air Force, and the Coast Guard during state arrival ceremonies at the White House and the Pentagon, as well as the inaugural parade every four years, and Independence Day observances in Washington, D.C. Its personnel serve as Casket bearers, Color guards, and Firing party.

== See also ==
- High Frontier Honor Guard
