= Presentation of Colours =

Traditional British military and Commonwealth ceremony

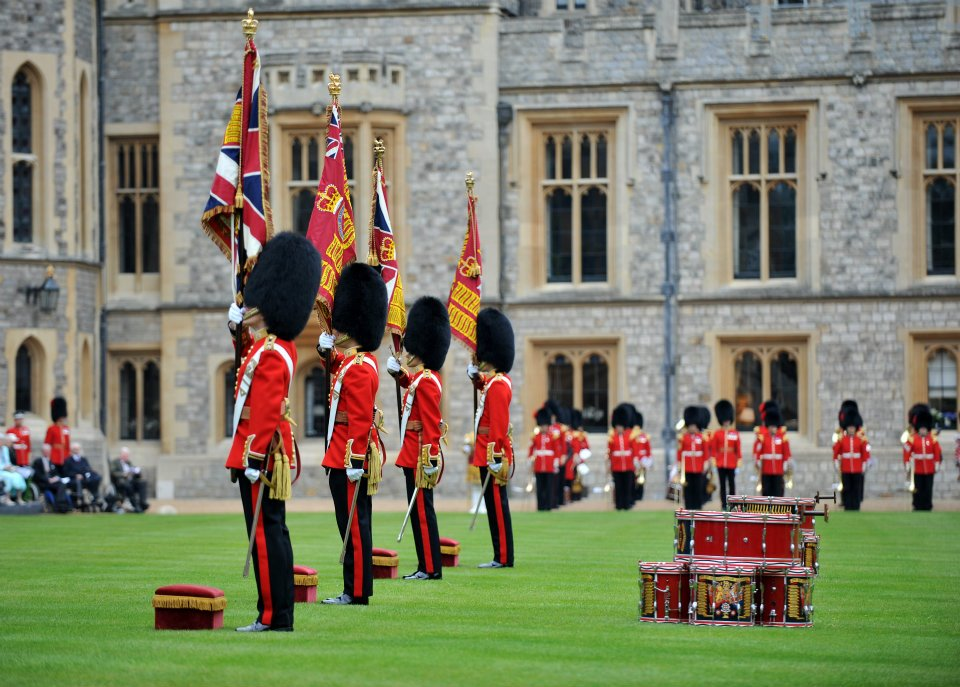
The Coldstream Guards laying up their old colours and receiving the new colours in October 2013.

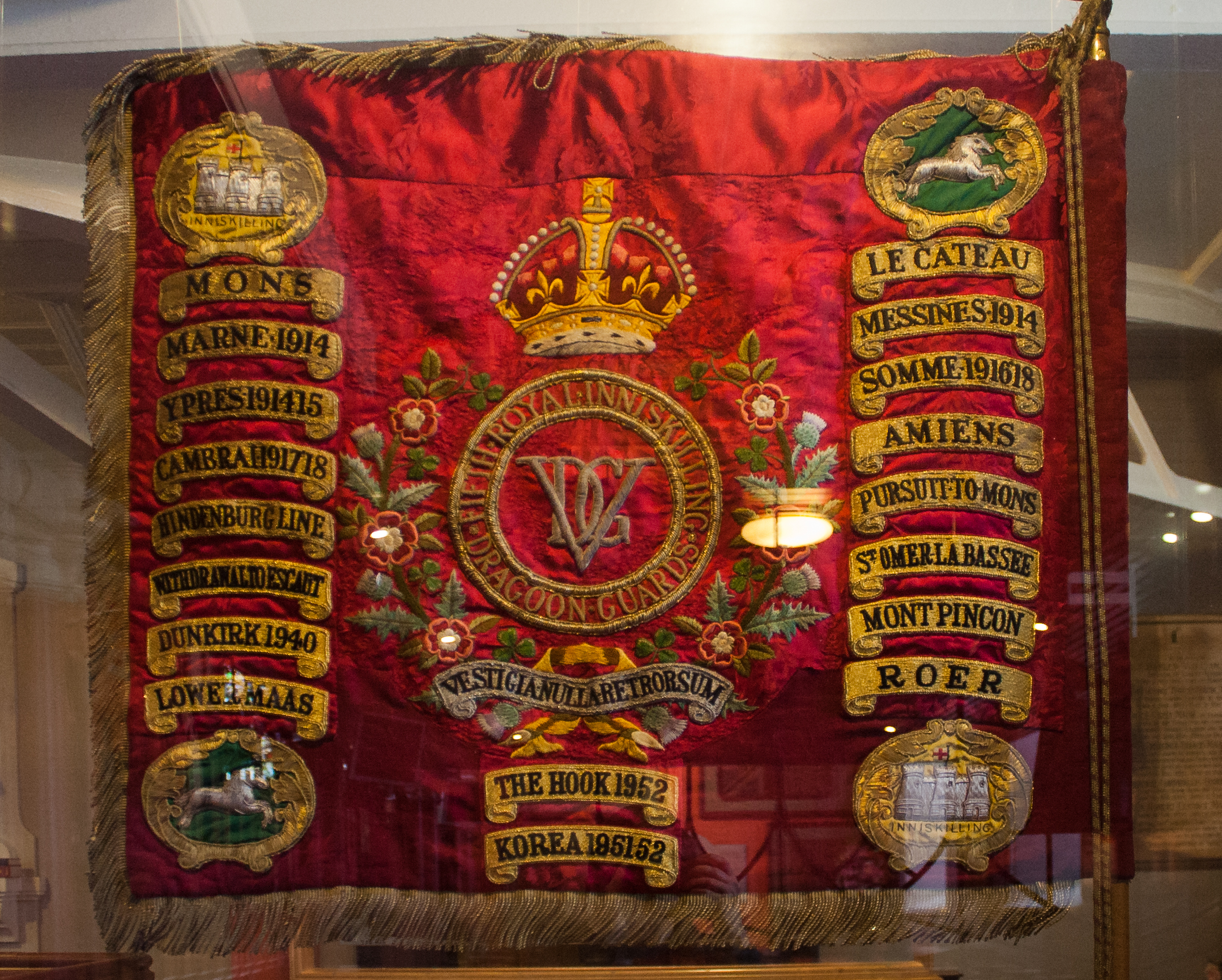
The regimental colours of the 5th Royal Inniskilling Dragoon Guards, displaying the battle honours awarded to the regiment.

The Presentation of Colours is a military ceremony that marks an anniversary or significant event in the history of a particular regiment or similar military unit. This involves the presentation of a new version of the regimental colour to a regiment or equivalent formation in their respective armed forces service branch. This is a traditional ceremony that was pioneered by the British Armed Forces and is today used in most Commonwealth countries.

== Background ==
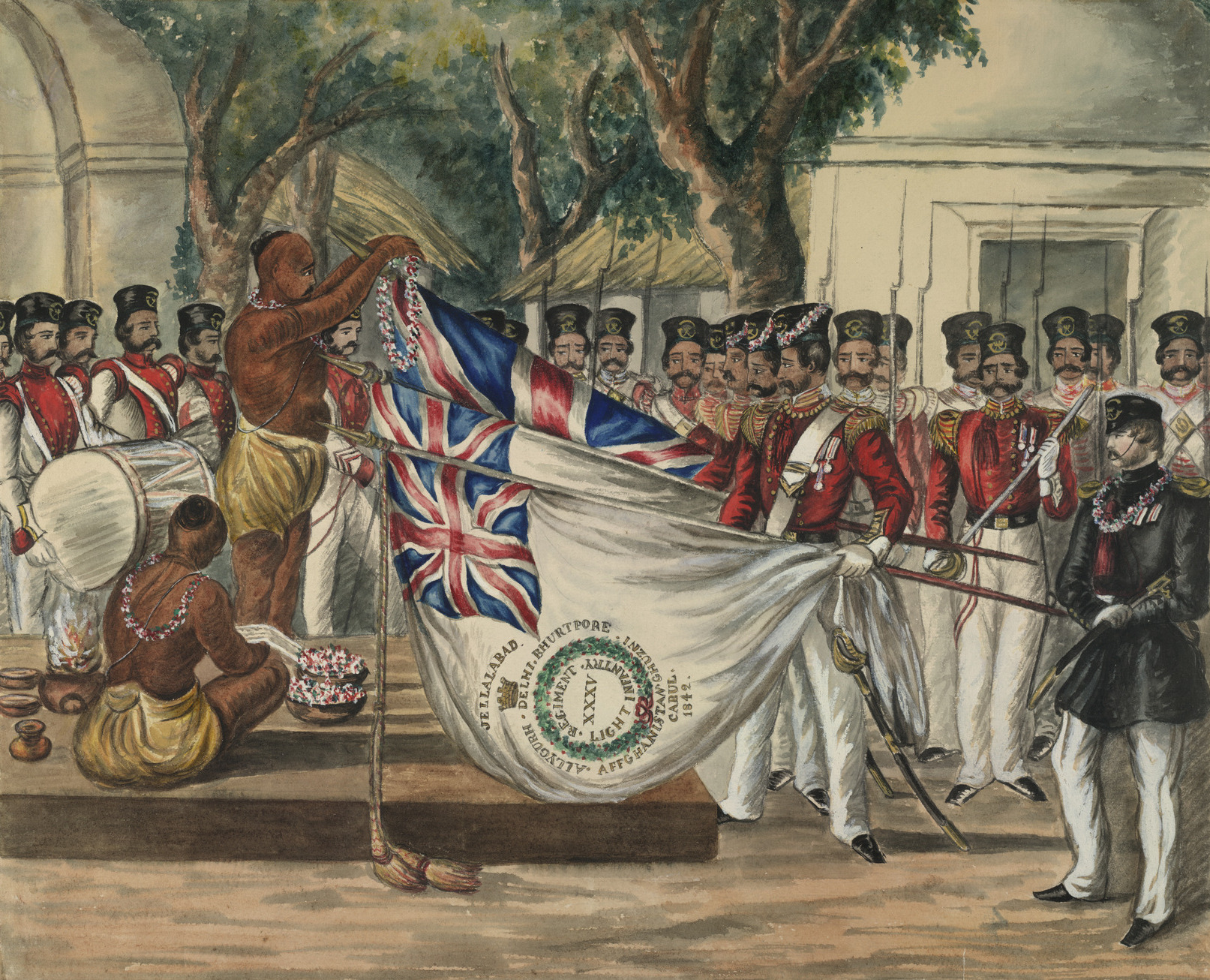
Hindu priests garlanding the colours of the 35th Bengal Light Infantry at a Presentation of Colours ceremony, c. 1847

In the military, the colours originally acted as a rallying point for troops and as a way to locate their commander. It originated in Ancient Egypt around 5,000 years ago, with the practice also being used in the Roman Empire and the Roman army specifically. It was made more significant in the Middle Ages when military colours were formalised with the coat of arms of the country. Colour guards at the time were introduced to escort the colour, and to make sure that the colour never was damaged. Today, colours are no longer carried into battle, due to the creation of modern weapons and the advancement of warfare and communications. Colours are now used as part of a regiment's tradition and symbolise the unit's identity, and are used at formal events.

The ceremony in most Commonwealth countries (particularly those of the former British Empire) concerns the entrustment to the concerned unit of either one or two colours, if for the latter case, the colours are a Sovereign's or National / Presidential Colour and the Regimental Colour (for the infantry, air force combat commands and naval establishments, as well as military educational centres) or the Sovereign's / Presidential Standard / Guidon (for cavalry units and training establishments). As a matter of tradition, colours are never issued to the light infantry, artillery, engineers and support branches, although differences exist (like in the armed forces of India, Pakistan, Singapore, Malaysia, Sri Lanka (save for light infantry), and Bangladesh).

Although primarily a military service, the Presentation of Colours may occasionally occur for non-combat public services such as the police; notable examples include the presentation of new a colour to the Royal Brunei Police Force, Brunei Darussalam in 1971, and the Railway Protection Force, India in 2006.

== Ceremony ==
The formation for the parade is a battalion-sized (100–500 soldiers) formation of military units of an armed forces formation from Commonwealth countries (from either the navy, army, or air force). From four to ten companies is the usual size of the parade and a military band combined with a corps of drums or pipes and drums providing the ceremonial music is present. The parade commander, the field officer holding the rank of a major or lieutenant colonel (commander or lieutenant commander in the navy, wing commander or squadron leader in the air force), takes his place in the centre of the parade field, assisted by the second-in-command and the parade adjutant.

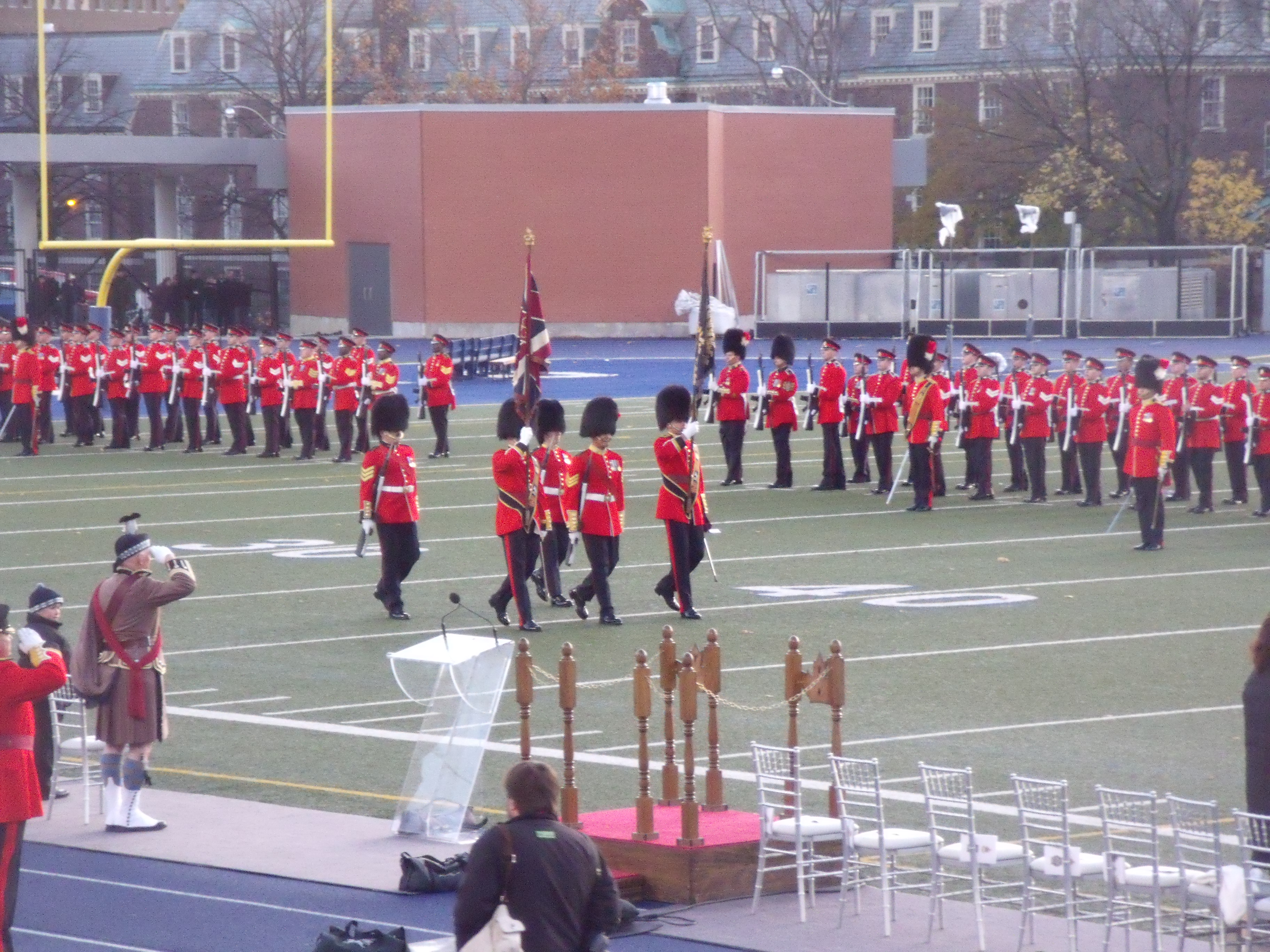
The old colours of the Royal Regiment of Canada are marched off during the presentation of new colours in November 2009.

With the regimental colonel-in-chief usually being the reviewing officer during the ceremony (other instances include members of the royal family in the United Kingdom / Commonwealth realms, the governor-general representing the royal family, the crown prince or king such as the one in Malaysia and Brunei, and or the president/head of state for other countries or in other cases the service branch or armed forces chief from the armed forces or service branches in these countries), upon their arrival, a royal salute (or presidential salute) from the regiment is executed, and then the guest inspects the combined guard of honour from the regiment as the band plays a slow march, in addition to the optional firing of a 21-gun salute. If the guest is a military general or flag-ranked officer, a general salute is executed by the formation before the inspection can begin.

After the inspection, a stick orderly will walk to the rear of the formation to receive the pace stick from the regimental sergeant major (who has a billet of a warrant officer) who will then draw their sword (symbolising the protection of the colours). The regiment's first company will then quickly march, usually in Commonwealth realms, to the tune of The British Grenadiers (irrespective of the regiment), to which the ceremony proceeds similarly to the Trooping of the Colour ceremony in London, with the 'Escort to the Colour' receiving the old colour so that they can troop it through the ranks of the rest of the regiment, preceded by a salute to the colours by the escort, usually with the band playing an abbreviated version of the national or royal anthem. After this part of the ceremony, the old colours of the regiment will be retired by the colour party in a slow march (most likely to the tune of Auld Lang Syne in Commonwealth Realms). After the old colours are officially retired, they are then laid up on a display (typically in the regimental chapel or the officer's mess, for example) as it will never be paraded by the regiment again. In British and Canadian practice, regimental colours are often laid up in a church or cathedral until they have almost totally disintegrated, which might take a century or more; at this point, the remains of the colour and its staff are then removed and cremated on consecrated ground.

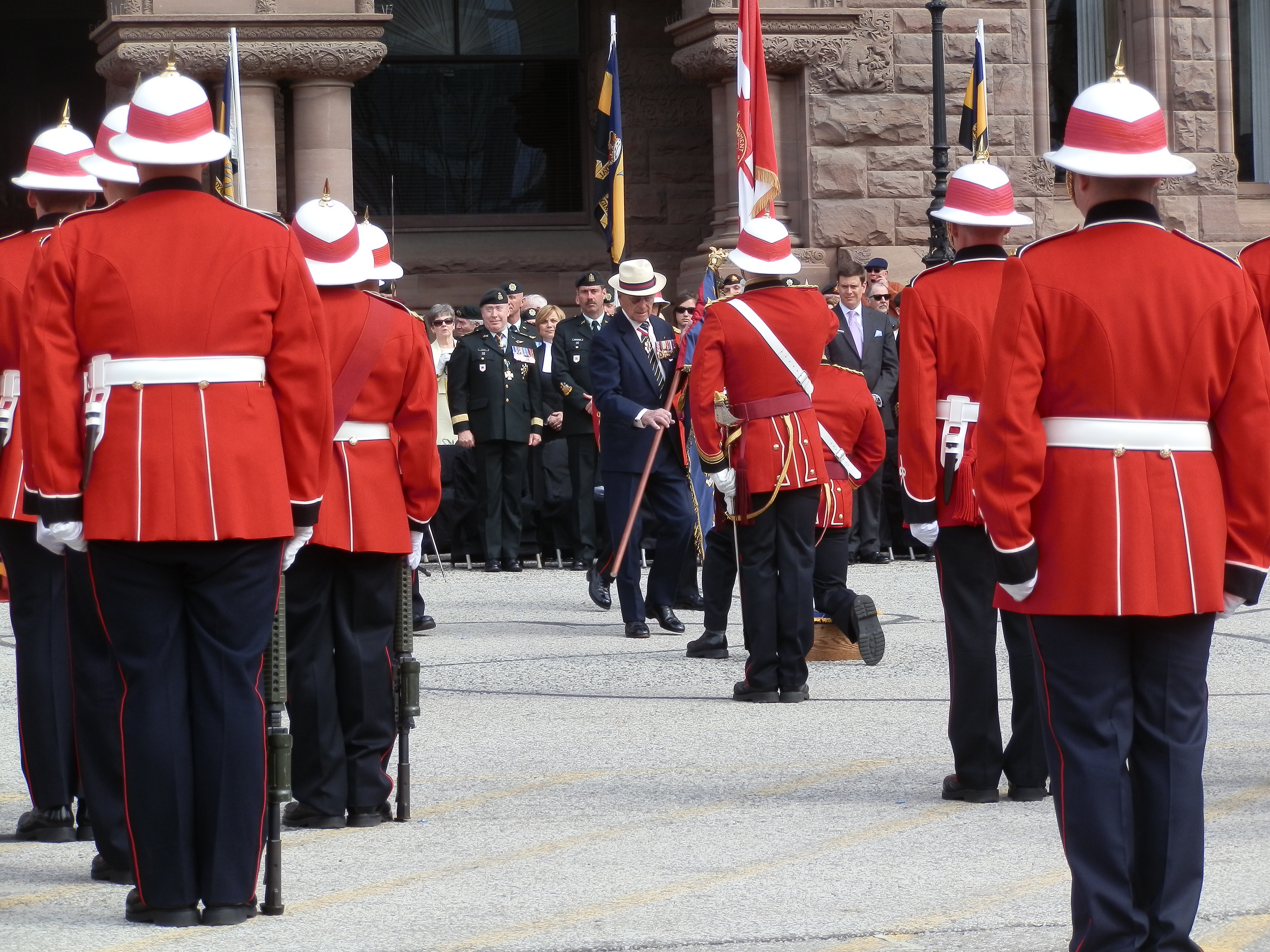
Prince Philip presents the new colours to the 3rd Battalion, The Royal Canadian Regiment in April 2013.

After this part of the ceremony, members of the corps of drums will form a spiritual altar from their instruments, after which the quartermaster will at that point bring out the new colour, earlier removed of its casing, and place it on top of the pile. Religious figures in the regiment (mostly from the Christian faith) will then give a blessing to the colours, the regiment, and the service branch. With this part being complete, the reviewing officer will briefly address the regiment to which they presented the colours to, which will be concluded with the speaker expressing confidence in the regiment, and the regimental commander thanking the reviewing officer for their words. Following this, the reviewing officer entrusts the colour(s), which had already been removed from the pile by non-commissioned officers (NCOs) earlier, to the colour ensign(s) of the unit holding the rank of second lieutenant (or pilot officer or ensign/sub-lieutenant depending on the service branch).

Once the drummers and commanders retire to their previous positions (in the band and the regiment respectively), the new colours are then marched to their position in a formation to the tune of the regimental march or the national anthem of the country in slow march. This will signal the start of the regimental march past for the reviewing officer who stands on a makeshift saluting base (or dais). While marching in a slow march, the new colours will be lowered (flourished) to the ground to show respect to the reviewing officer, if in a quick march, they are not.

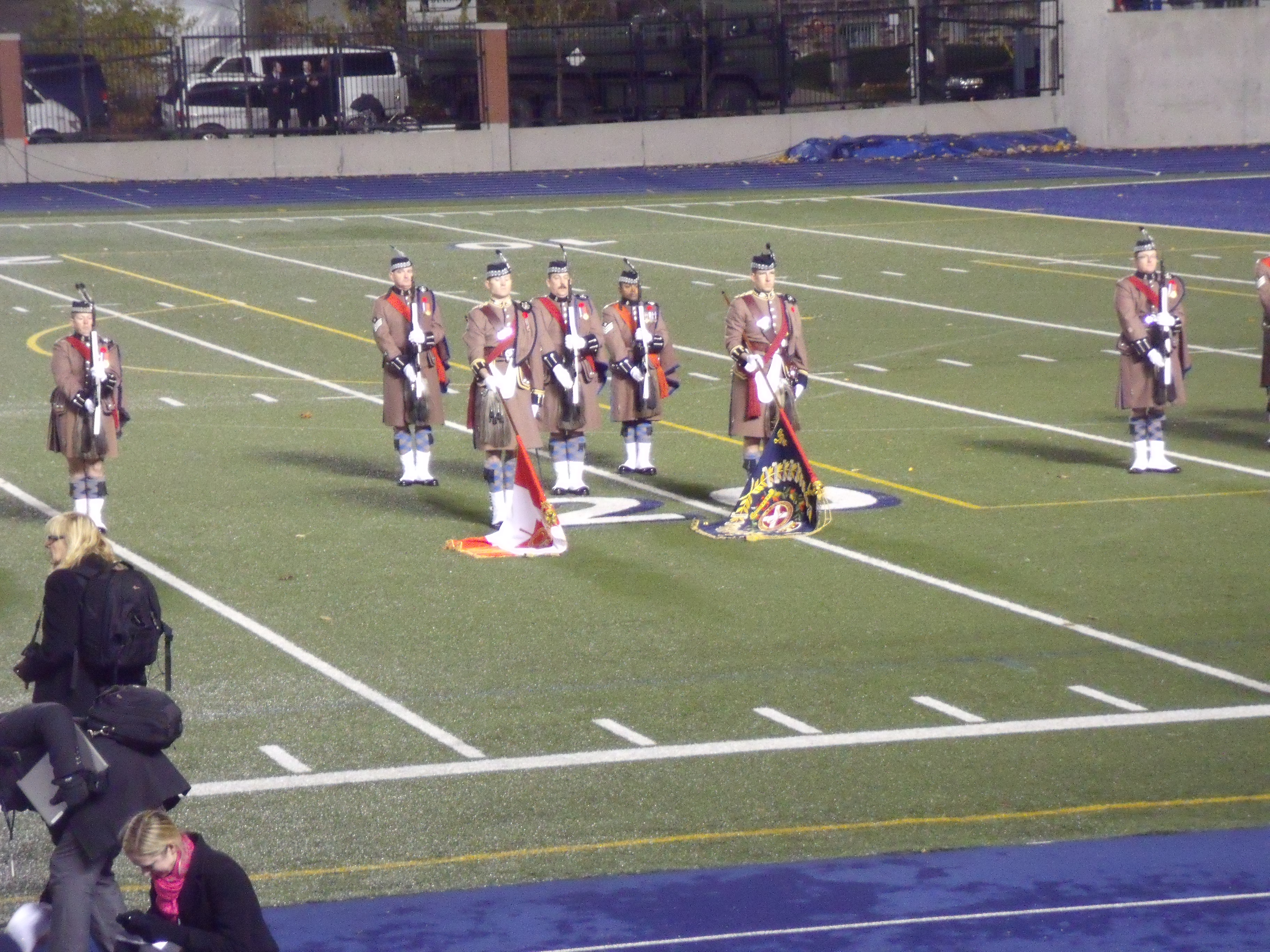
The colour guard of the Toronto Scottish Regiment lowers its colours during the royal salute, at the end of the ceremony.

An Advance in Review Order is used to signal the end of the presentation of colours ceremony, by which the regiment offers a final royal salute / presidential salute (usually by presenting arms), followed by the optional three cheers. Following this, either the guest departs from the tribune and the entire parade marches out with the new colours, or the ceremony reforms to march past order to render a final salute to the guest following the final report by the parade commander, and the whole unit marches out in that manner with the band marching out last.

In Malaysia, the order of the presentation is different. In the case of the presentation of new colours to existing units, following the inspection of the ranks by the reviewing officer, the old colour is retired, followed by the presentation of the new colour, prayers and the speech, followed by the handover of the new colour to the ensign and the trooping of the newly presented colour through the ranks before the march past in both slow and quick march, as well as the performance of the state or national anthem if the reviewing officer is either the King of Malaysia or state sultans, who are the colonels-in-chief of their respective units. In India, in reflection of the country's diverse religions, the colours consecration prayers are offered by military chaplains of religions represented in the armed forces (Hinduism, Sikhism, Christianity, and Islam).

Until the mechanisation of the cavalry regiments in Commonwealth armies in the 1930s, the form of the presentation of colours of cavalry regiments was mounted by either the sovereign or representatives of the British royal family, and the guidons or standards were, as in today, laid on timpani which also occasionally carried the regimental honours or in the same drum sets as in the infantry if unavailable. Some light regiments only had timpani that carried the battle honours of the unit on parade until the 1950s.

== Notable and recent ceremonies ==
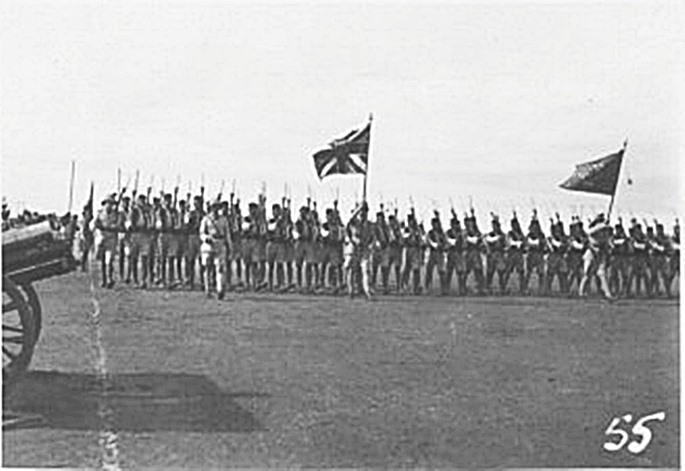
Presentation of Colours, Coronation Day, Ghana, 1937.

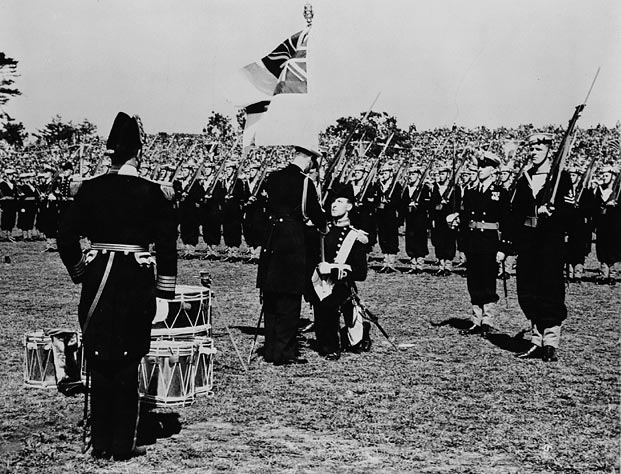
King George VI presenting the King's Colour to the Royal Canadian Navy in Beacon Hill Park, Victoria, May 1939.

date	recipient(s)	country	ref.
1863	Royal Gurkha Rifles (Queen's Truncheon)	United Kingdom	
31 Jul 1915	38th Battalion, Canadian Expeditionary Force	Canada	
13 Feb 1927	55th Battalion, New South Wales Rifle Regiment	Australia	
Nov 1931	1st Punjab Regiment	India	
12 May 1937	Ghana (Gold Coast) Regiment, Gold Coast Colony	Ghana	
30 May 1939	Royal Canadian Navy	Canada	
21 Apr 1954	Ceylon Light Infantry	Ceylon	
28 Dec 1954	Royal New Zealand Air Force	New Zealand	
1961	Singapore Infantry Regiment	Singapore	
3 Jun 1962	The Seaforth Highlanders of Canada	Canada	
31 May 1966	Royal Brunei Malay Regiment	Brunei Darussalam	
23 May 1970	9th Battalion, Madras Regiment	India	
1971	Royal Brunei Police Force	Brunei Darussalam	
1974	SAFTI Military Institute	Singapore	
Jan 1977	Singapore Combat Engineers	Singapore	
1996	Royal Brunei Air Force	Brunei Darussalam	
Jun 1997	Governor General's Foot Guards	Canada	
5 Nov 2009	Royal Regiment of Canada, and the Toronto Scottish Regiment	Canada	
22 Oct 2011	Royal Military College, Duntroon	Australia	
3 May 2012	1st Battalion and No. 7 Company, Coldstream Guards	United Kingdom	
27 Apr 2013	3rd Battalion, Royal Canadian Regiment	Canada	
11 Jun 2015	Royal Welsh	United Kingdom	
7 Mar 2016	18 Cavalry Regiment, Indian Army	India	
11 May 2016	Royal Johor Military Force	Malaysia	
15 Sep 2016	Royal Ranger Regiment	Malaysia	
3 Mar 2017	Mechanical Training Institute and 125 Helicopter Squadron	India	
1 Sep 2017	Royal Canadian Air Force	Canada	
22 Mar 2018	51 Squadron and 230 Signal Unit, Indian Air Force	India	
10 Jul 2018	Royal Air Force (centenary)	United Kingdom	
5 Dec 2018	Royal Malay Regiment	Malaysia	
24 Mar 2019	Barbados Coast Guard	Barbados	
1 Jun 2019	5th Battalion, Royal Australian Regiment	Australia	
27 Sep 2019	Corps of Army Air Defence	India	
19 Nov 2019	Indian Naval Academy	India	
30 Mar 2021	Royal Australian Air Force	Australia	
29 Apr 2021	Infantry Regiment No.63 'Barcelona'	Spain	
25 Nov 2021	Jamaica Defence Force	Jamaica	
30 Nov 2021	Barbados Defence Force (Barbados Regiment and Barbados Coast Guard)	Barbados	
13 Dec 2021	19th Kenya Rifles Battalion, Kenya Army Infantry	Kenya	
Nov 2022	General Sir John Kotelawala Defence University	Sri Lanka	
9 Dec 2022	Royal Canadian Dragoons	Canada	
27 Apr 2023	Life Guards, Royal Navy, King's Company, Grenadier Guards, Royal Air Force	United Kingdom	
27 Apr 2023	Nigerian Army (the largest conducted in the Commonwealth, with 81 colours being issued)	Nigeria	
13 May 2023	Essex and Kent Scottish	Canada	
6 Jun 2023	6th Battalion, Royal Australian Regiment	Australia	
8 Sep 2023	Royal Canadian Mounted Police	Canada	
14 Oct 2023	Lorne Scots (Peel, Dufferin and Halton Regiment)	Canada	
5 Dec 2024	Canadian Special Operations Regiment	Canada	
10 Aug 2025	Indonesian National Armed Forces (Largest conducted in Indonesian history)	Indonesia	
5 Jun 2026	Royal Marines	United Kingdom	
9 Jun 2026	Grenadier Guards	United Kingdom	

== Variants in other countries ==
=== Germany ===
Military colours in Germany began to be presented by order of the Federal Ministry of Defence (BMVg) on 18 September 1964. This was a direct result of the production of unauthorised unit colours by army soldiers, which became illegal in the early 1960s. The first German military colours were presented by President Heinrich Lübke to the ceremonial Wachbataillon (based in Berlin) on 7 January 1965. Colours are presented at the battalion and regiment levels of the Bundeswehr. The presentation is presided over by the Federal Minister of Defence, who serves as the commander-in-chief of the Bundeswehr in times of peace, or by the Inspector General of the Bundeswehr. Optionally the President presents the colour himself.

The Volksarmee of the former German Democratic Republic (GDR, or East Germany) conducted similar ceremonies that resembled its Soviet (and later Russian) counterparts.

=== Poland ===
In Poland, the ceremony of the presentation of colours (Polish: Uroczystość wręczenia sztandaru) to units of the Polish Armed Forces, the Police, the Border Guard, State Fire Service, and other uniformed organisations, is a ceremony of great importance. The decree issuing colours to these organisations is issued by the superior authority of the responsible state ministry or by the President of Poland, for example, armed forces colours are granted to deserving units by decree of the Minister of National Defence. The ceremony is a mix of various influences, specifically German, Russian, and British, while also incorporating elements from the Royal Commonwealth period like the blessing of the colours in the presence of the Catholic priest or bishop on the night of or before the presentation. The reviewing officer is either a general or flag grade officer with higher billets and / or command responsibilities or a minister/deputy minister or chairman/vice chairman of the concerned government ministry/agency, or even the President himself in special cases.

=== Post-Soviet states ===
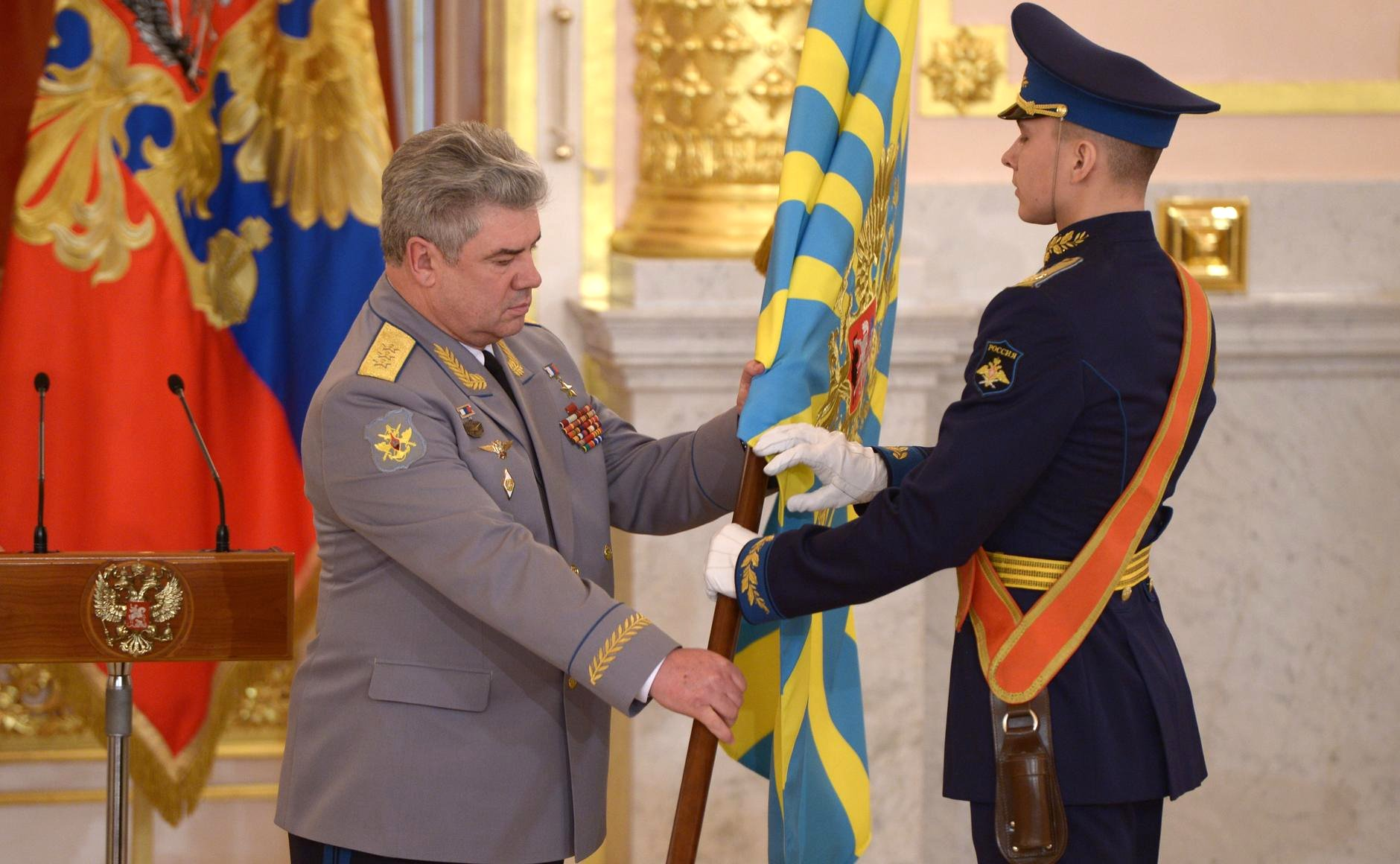
The presentation of the banner of the Russian Aerospace Forces.

The presentation of colours in member countries of the Commonwealth of Independent States (CIS), and other post-Soviet states like Ukraine, has significant differences from the British. The colours are known in Russia and many other CIS countries as battle flags, which have great importance in the armed forces. In the case of the Russian Armed Forces, this ceremony is ordered by the Minister of Defence, who signs a decree awarding the colours to a unit, command, or educational institution. Decrees for the granting of colours to the uniformed forces of the Ministries of the Internal Affairs (Police, Drug Service, and Migration Service), Justice (Federal Penitentiary Service and Federal Bailiffs Service) and Emergency Situations, as well as to the National Guard, the Federal Security and Protective Services, are under the authority of the Minister of the concerned ministry, or in the case of the other three the President of Russia. Similar orders are granted by ministers or by the office of the President or Prime Minister of other CIS countries, and Ukraine for the armed forces and public uniformed services of these countries. It can be held either outdoors in the military barracks or parade ground, or indoors in a theatre or public hall. Optionally, like in Russia, and Ukraine, the President serves as the reviewing officer and can be assigned the duty of presenting the new colours to the unit concerned.

In addition to the militaries of post-Soviet states, the Mongolian Armed Forces have also adopted the presentation of colours ceremony from the Soviet Armed Forces. The order for the bestowment of colours to distinguished formations is similarly granted by the President or by government ministers/agency heads.

==== Outdoor ceremony ====
The formation for the outdoor parade is a battalion-sized (100–900 soldiers) formation of military units of an armed forces formation from CIS countries (from either the navy, army, and air force, as well as public security formations in these countries). Four to fourteen companies are the usual size of the parade, and a military band providing the ceremonial music is present. The parade commander is either a field grade or general / flag grade officer of the armed forces or public security formations, while the reviewing officer can be a general or flag grade officer with higher billets or command responsibilities, or a minister/deputy minister or chairman/vice chairman of the concerned government ministry/agency.

Following the entrance of the national colour guard carrying the national flag (usually in Russia accompanied by the playing by the band of the March of the Preobrazhensky Regiment), the parade commander then marches off to inform the reviewing officer of the readiness of the parade to receive the concerned unit colours. Following the report, both march to the centre of the parade ground while the parade presents arms, following this the reviewing officer greets the assembled formation:

Minister/Reviewing Officer: Greetings, comrades!
Troops: Greetings to you (state rank/office title), sir!

In Ukraine the addressing format is as follows:

Minister/Reviewing Officer: Glory to Ukraine!
Troops: Glory to the heroes, sir!

The parade is then ordered to stand at ease.

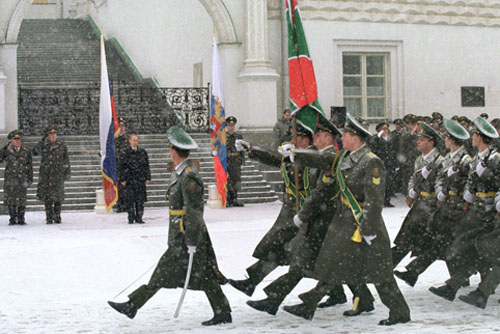
The Federal Border Guard Service of Russia performs a march past Vladimir Putin during the ceremony.

Following this, the new colour, which had already been marched in by a colour guard behind the reviewing officer, is being prepared to be removed of its casing. The right escort NCO of the colour removes the casing as the senior NCO, who serves as the ensign, dips the colour, thus revealing the new colour of the concerned unit, as the band plays a drum roll (in Russia the band then plays the "Moscow Fanfare" following it), after this, the ensign dips the colour first to the right and then to the left before returning to the carry position. If necessary, religious figures (Orthodox Church, Islamic or Buddhist) will then consecrate the newly uncased colour. After the uncasing and players, the order on the entrustment of the colour is read out, following by the addresses of the reviewing officer, and the commander of the unit that will receive the colour. The reviewing officer congratulates the unit on the reception of the colour, expressing confidence in the men and women who serve, and the unit commander then replies to express profound gratitude on this occasion. After this the reviewing officer obtains the colour, which is then handed over to the commanding officer, the moment of which is then followed by the playing of the country's national anthem by the band. Then the unit commander hands over the new colour to another colour guard and its ensign, who, as the parade, presenting arms and in the eyes right position, shouts a threefold Oorah while the band plays appropriate music, together with the commander, troops the colour through the ranks before taking its place of honour in the formation. Following the trooping, the formation reforms to march past the order to render a final salute to the reviewing officer, and the whole unit marches out in that manner with the band marching out last.

In Ukraine, following the presentation of the new colour, the commanding officer of the unit receiving its colour, following his report of the readiness to take care of the colour, first removes his headgear to touch the colour in the hands of the reviewing officer before handing it over to the unit's colour guard.

=== Spain ===
The form of a Spanish Armed Forces ceremony of presentation of colours is known as the Ceremonia de Entrega de la Enseña Nacional (National Ensign Delivery Ceremony) or Ceremonia de Entrega de la Bandera Nacional (National Flag Delivery Ceremony). The principal guest for such a ceremony is the King of Spain in his duties as Commander in Chief of the Armed Forces, if absent, the Queen of Spain or the Chiefs of Staff of branches of the armed forces (Army, Navy, Air Force, Civil Guard, Royal Guard, and Military Emergencies Unit) is present as the reviewing officer, as well as any high-ranking general and flag officers of the service branches on behalf of their service heads. The colour in question is a form of the Flag of Spain called a batallona, gold-fringed, with the regimental name, in black lettering, surrounding the state coat of arms in the centre. While the large colour is for regiments of the infantry and educational and training institutions, a small colour is used by the cavalry and artillery as a sort of Royal Standard.

The ceremony follows the same concept as in the Commonwealth. But for units with two or more battalions, the size is eight to nineteen companies (for regiments or equivalents with a minimum of two to four battalions). It is mostly an outdoor ceremony. In addition, similar ceremonies have been held by law enforcement organisations.

==== Spanish outdoor ceremony ====
The ceremony begins with the entrance of the regimental band and Field Music (banda de guerra) of the regiment or institution receiving the colour, following which the pennant and guidon bearers march to their places in the parade ground. After which, the band strikes up to a quick march as the battalion or regimental formation marches into the grounds, and after briefly marking time, halts. The parade commander, a field officer with the rank of major / lieutenant colonel or equivalent, takes up his position in the centre of the parade ground with a three-to-four-man staff, together with the battalion guidon bearer and a command bugler (cornetin de ordenes). As in the Commonwealth, all wear full or service dress uniform.

During the arrival of the guest of honour, the appropriate music is played as a general or royal salute is rendered:

- For senior ranked officers: Marcha del Infantes
- For senior ranked command general or flag officers: Marcha Real (shortened version)
- For the Prince or Princess of Asturias: Marcha Real (shortened version)
- For the King and / or Queen: Marcha Real (full version)

After this, the parade commander and their staff march to the saluting station to welcome the honouree and inform him or her of the readiness of the parade for inspection. After the report, the honouree, the reviewing officer of the ceremony, inspects the ceremonial formation as the band plays music. After the conclusion of the inspection segment, the guest of honour takes his or her place in the grandstand to commence the ceremony proper, meeting with other dignitaries (including military and civil representatives).

If a new battalion guidon is to be presented, an orderly presents the battalion guidon or fanion to the reviewing officer, who then hands it over to the guidon bearer.

The new regimental or institution colour is then marched into the field with the colour ensign, usually a subaltern officer in the rank of second or first lieutenant (or equivalent), and once approaching the centre of the parade ground together with the colour guard, the commander of the unit receiving the colour informs the guest of honour of the readiness of the colour to be officially presented to the unit. The guest of honour is then joined by a Catholic chaplain, who then prays the prayer for the consecration of the new colour, and blesses it. The guest of honour, after speaking the keynote address, then returns to the grandstand, and then the unit's commanding officer says the traditional formula as the ensign steps out of the colour guard to formally present the new colour:

Servicemen and women, before you is the Flag, the symbol of Spain, the immortal homeland, and it is therefore your supreme obligation and duty, even at the cost of your lives, to defend it.

Following the words, the commanding officer then orders, in fulfilment of the pledge to defend the new colour of the unit, for a feu de joie to be fired by either the whole formation or a company or platoon of the concerned formation. After this the following exchange is made:

- Commanding officer: Long live Spain!
- Formation: Huzzah!

Following this the new colour ensign resumes his place with the colour guard, who after taking their position in the colour guard, marches to the formation as it salutes the new colour (with the band playing Marcha Real) with the colour officer, also a subaltern ranked officer, escorting the ensign and three to four armed escorts behind him or her as they take post and the audience stands in respect as the anthem is played. After this, the commanding officer of the unit has their address, in which they thanks the guest of honour for their presence, and says of the importance of the ceremony to the unit that had just received new colours. Following the address, a memorial ceremony is held, wherein as the new colour remains in the formation the guidons and fanions of the unit, which had already marched into the centre, then march in slow march with a two-man wreath section, carrying a wreath, as the band plays La Muerte No Es El Final. This ceremonial segment is also present during military ceremonies, as it is a remembrance of the country's military dead over the centuries and in all wars and deployments. After the wreath party stops at a designated cenotaph either at the west or east end of the parade ground and lays the wreath, the band, together with the field music, plays the Toque de Oracion, and a second feu de joie by the leading platoon or company of the formation is fired as the guidons and fanions are lowered by the bearers to the direction of the cenotaph or monument. After that, the guidons and fanions resume their normal position and return to their places in the parade with the bearers. Following the ceremony, the formation marches off reformed to march past order, and then marches past the dignitaries with the new colour and its colour guard, together with the regimental band and field music. As they march past, the guidons and fanions are flourished, and then recovered after passing the grandstand. As the colour guard marches past with the new colour, the audience stands, and those in the grandstand salute the new colour.

=== Thailand ===
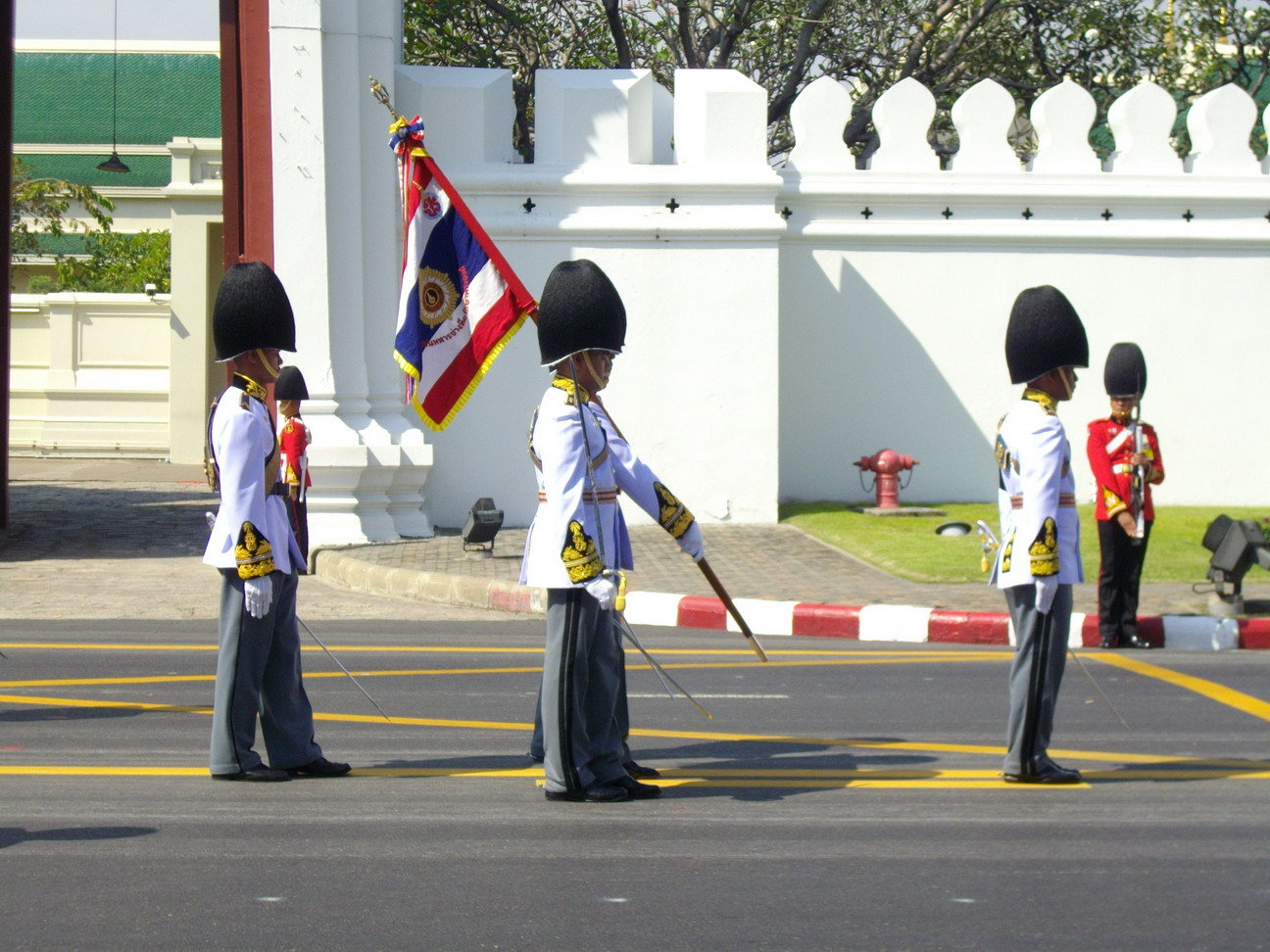
The Unit Colour of the 1st Engineer Battalion, King's Guard of the Royal Thai Army during the funeral procession of Princess Galyani Vadhana in 2008.

Each unit of the Royal Thai Armed Forces is given a colour called the Thong Chai Chalermphol (Thai: ธงชัยเฉลิมพล) or Victory Colours. These are presented to each unit personally by the King of Thailand. The flags are divided into four different designs, for: Royal Thai Army, Royal Thai Navy, Royal Thai Air Force, and King's Guard units, and is presented in a public ceremony usually in December days following National Day celebrations.

Before their presentation, the colours are ceremonially blessed in a religious ceremony attended by Buddhist monks and other high ranking dignitaries inside the Temple of the Emerald Buddha in Bangkok. During the ceremony amidst the chanting of the monks, the King will personally hammer the brass nails into the staff of each colour using a silver hammer. Each colour contains about 32–35 nails, in which the cloth is attached to the wooden staff. Within the same ceremony, the King will also take a strand of his own hair and conceal it within a compartment at the top of the staff, which is closed by a round silver screw top. The King will also attach each colour with its own ceremonial Buddha image, and bless each colour with holy water as monks chant a blessing to the new colours. The ceremony is steeped in Buddhist and Brahmic heritage, it symbolises and cements the King's role as Chief Kshatriya (กษัตริย์) or Warrior ruler of his realm. It also emphasises his constitutional role as Head and Chief of the Royal Thai Armed Forces (จอมทัพไทย: Chomthap Thai) Following the Buddhist consecration, the colours, placed beforehand on a table, are then received by the commanders of the units that have granted their colours by decree of the Minister of Defence, and in a further ceremony outside the temple later on, are then handed over by the King to the colour ensigns of these units, who then return to their places in their respective colour guards with the new colours.

== See also ==
- Beating Retreat
- Guard mounting
- Posting the Colours
- Remembrance Day
- Trooping the Colour
- Battle honour
- Category: Military symbols
