= Flag raising =

Flag raising may refer to:

- Flag planting
- Hoisting the flag
  - Flag Raising Ceremony

== See also ==
- Posting the Colors
