= High Frontier Honor Guard =

US Space Force ceremonial unit based in Colorado Springs, CO

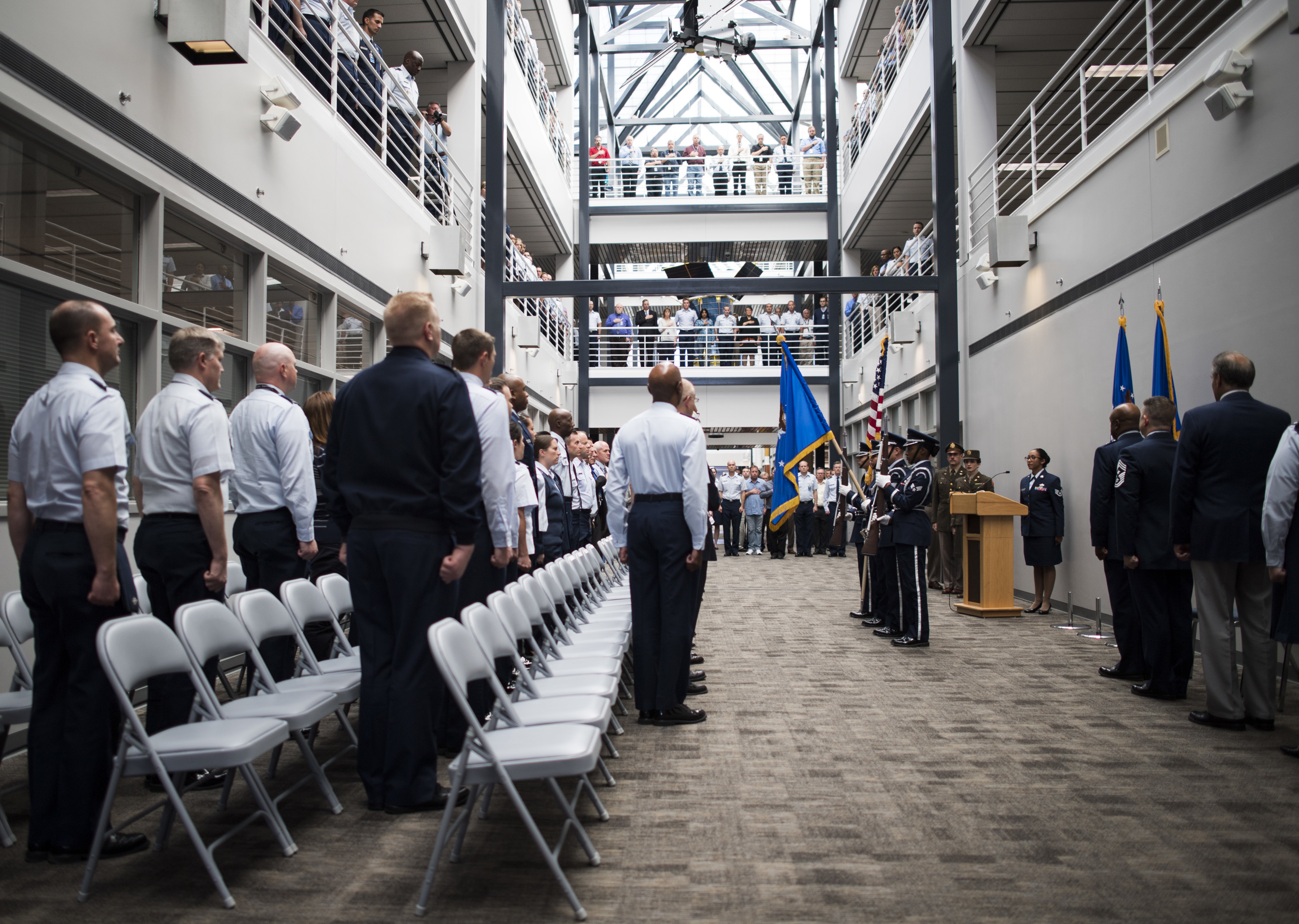
Members of the High Frontier Honor Guard Posting the Colors at the Air Force birthday, September 2016.

The High Frontier Honor Guard is the official United States Space Force ceremonial unit assigned to Peterson Space Force Base in Colorado Springs, Colorado. It renders honors to local officials and veterans during ceremonies and parades. In conducting its duties, it has an area of responsibility that consists of the most counties in Colorado and 8 in the western part of neighboring Kansas. Outside of Peterson SFB, it also recruits guardians from Schriever Space Force Base at the request of their unit leadership. Bugles Across America is partnered with the honor guard to ensure a live bugler is present at events.

== Creed ==
The creed is as follows:

I am a member of the United States Air Force High Frontier Honor Guard. I represent an elite team of dedicated men and women charged to honor our nation, its flag and those who have served our nation well. As a member of this team, I will strive to excel while performing my duty. I will dedicate myself toward principles of honor, integrity, commitment and dedication – the foundation on which this unit stands. I realize that only through hard work and training will I achieve distinction. I am unique – second to none – best of the best and above the rest.

== See also ==
- King's Colour Squadron
- United States Air Force Honor Guard
