= Air support base =

An air support base (air support command base for those bases designated for the "five air support command headquarters"--I, II, III, IV, V Air Support Commands*) were dozens of United States Army Air Forces military installations created near Continental United States camps/forts of the Army Ground Forces. The bases were developed as part of the "air support base development program" when National Guard observation squadrons inducted into federal service in 1940-1941 had insufficient facilities to conduct their training. In 1941 HQ USAAF had an Air Ground Support Section which had documented Air Support Base Requirements and on 1 December 1942, the AAF published the entire Station List for support bases.

Four support bases were each named for its army post (Camp Atterbury Army Airfield, Camp Breckenridge Army Airfield, Camp Campbell Army Airfield, & Camp Davis Army Airfield), one base supported two army posts (Camps Claiborne & Beauregard), and at least three army posts each had two support bases (e.g., Camp Blanding, Camp Shelby, and Indiantown Gap Military Reservation). Each airfield was either constructed or the "air support field" was leased from an existing owner (e.g., municipal airfields built by the Civil Aeronautics Administration). Air support bases were generally adjacent to the army post using additional federally-acquired land (e.g., Santa Maria Army Airfield at Camp Cooke), but airfields were built on some of the large Army reservations (e.g., Fort Dix Army Airfield). Most of the existing airfields that were selected were away from the post, e.g., the 1926 Colorado Springs Municipal Airfield ~10 mi (16 km) from Camp Carson), and the airbase was subsequently built adjacent (Army Air Base, Colorado Springs, was next to the airfield later named Peterson Field.) Although planned as support bases, many of the bases were assigned other primary missions, e.g., for reconnaissance, bombardment, or other training (Esler Field remained only a support base), and a few of the airbases and posts became a single military facility, e.g., the post-war Cooke Air Force Base included both the former army airfield and the former army camp (Biggs Air Force Base was incorporated as part of Fort Bliss in 1966.)

In 1943, most of the air support bases transferred to 3rd Air Force when it gained the air support commands. Several of the air support bases that were inactivated after World War II were resurrected for Cold War operations.
