= Unit designations of the United States Army Air Force and United States Air Force =

Title needs correction to AAF (Army Air Forces)

The US Army Air Forces (AAF), in addition to its combat units and flying units, also had non-flying units and organizations which used several types of designations during the period of the AAF (June, 1941 into September, 1947).

In addition, the AAF restructured its domestic and continental structure during early spring 1944, this resulted in a base unit structure. The base units centralized the command of the support functions at a location and created a communication and organizational relations among flying and non-flying elements. It established a logistics basis for air operations.

This restructuring resulted from a February 1944 Army Air Forces Headquarters order that units at each installation to be consolidated into Army Air Forces base units.

The base unit structure in turn was replaced by base Wing structure in which commanders controlled both facilities and organizations. This arrangement soon lead to the Wing structure used today by the USAF that eliminated the Group level.

== Base units ==
Base unit (BU) numbering in 1944 -1945 World War II era followed a structure based on the AAF Organization. This structure included allocations for HQ AAF; the continental numbered air forces; the major commands; and other non-flying organizations. Because the Air Transport Command (ATC) had overseas bases. the ATC structure includes designations for worldwide base units, outside the continental USA in addition to domestic bases.

In the base unit numbering, the number of digits and the leading numerals had structural significance. Thus a two digit number reflected certain types of organizations; and similarly, three and four digit numbers represented other organizational structures.

== Base unit numbering ==
Headquarters and certain direct reporting organizations use two digit numbers.

The continental, numbered Air Forces used three digit numbers from 100 through the 400 range with the leading digit indicating the numbered Air Force. Thus First Air Force bases' units were in the 100 series range, and so forth for 200 -400. Other organization also used three digit numbers of 500 and beyond.

Certain commands, schools, and specialized organizations and centers used the four digit numbers and again, the lead digit signified the parent organization or geographic region.

The Air Depot system bases were numbered systematically also in the base unit structure.

=== Other examples ===
BU 326 Mac Dill AAB, FL (3 AF)

420th BASE UNIT March Field, CA (4th AF) 811ST AAF Base Unit Mitchel Fld N Y

== Cold War unit designations ==
Most AAFBUs were inactivated before the 1947 USAF was established, but some were redesignated Air Force base units (AF BU), e.g., base operating units on 26 September 1947 such as Brooks' 306th, Barksdale's 2621st, and Williams' 3010th. Although many base units were smaller than squadrons, some AF BUs included squadrons, e.g., the E and R Squadrons of Bolling's 4 AF BU, and Sq R (Bergstrom) and Sq M (Offutt) of the 130 AF BU. New AF BU unit designations were established as late as 16 May 1948 (Williams' 775 AF BU), and the 496 Finance Disbursing Unit at Kelly was designated on 19 February 1951. Nearly all "unit" designation were obsolete c. 1 May 1952 when MacDill's "2156 Air Rscu Unit" was inactivated.
