= Present arms (command) =

Two-part drill command

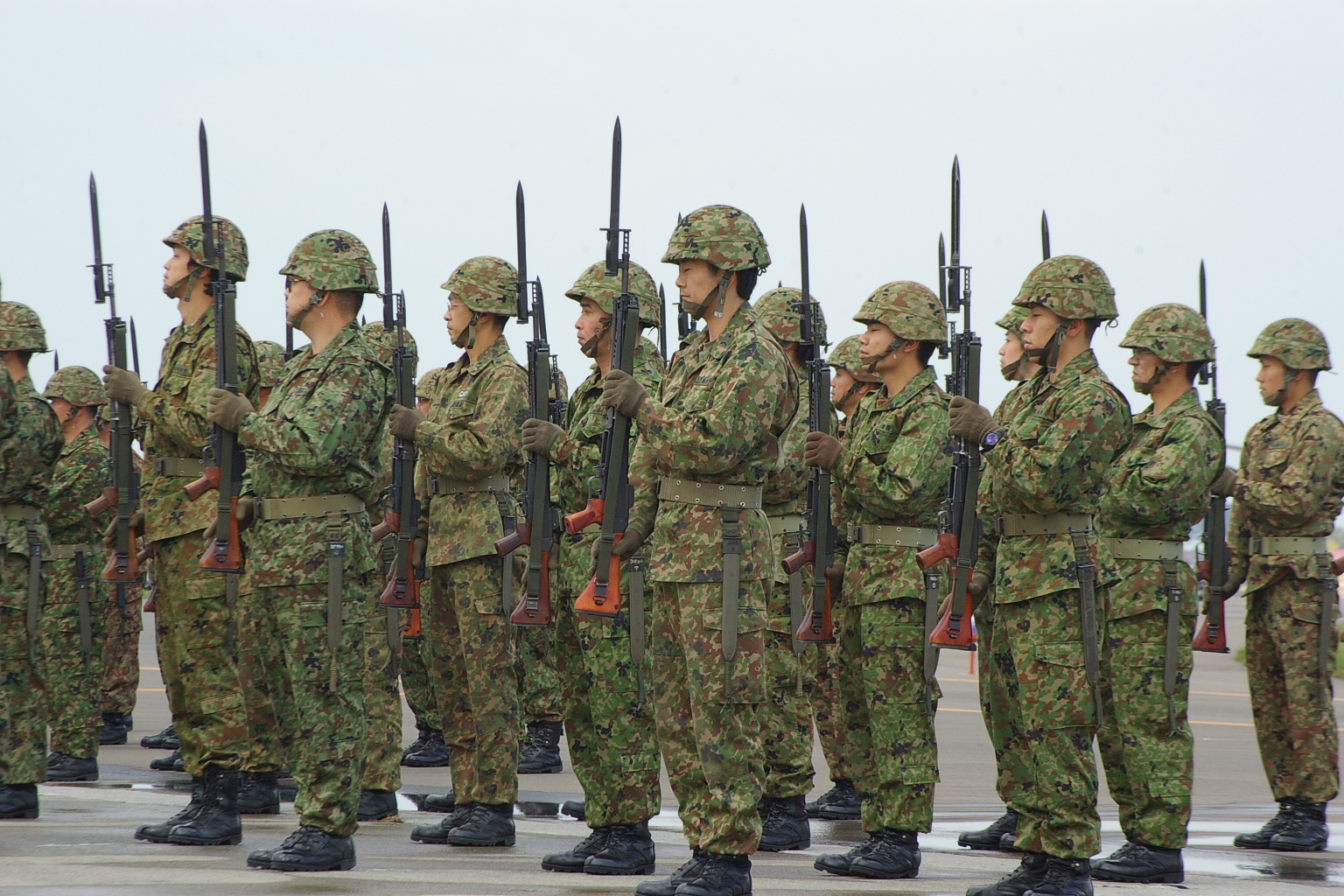
Japanese soldiers present arms with bayonets fixed

Present arms is a two-part drill command used by many military and public safety professionals as a sign of respect. It comes from the old British command "Arms to the present!". The term was used between 1700 and the late nineteenth century in Great Britain, and later across the United Kingdom.

== By country ==
=== Australia ===
In the Australian Defence Force, the command "Present arms" is obeyed:

- If unarmed, a salute is given.
- If armed with an F88 Austeyr, the command is "Present ... arms". The movement is divided into two parts:
  - "Present arms by numbers – One": The right forearm moves up, bringing the rifle to a vertical position with the front handgrip aligned with the right shoulder.
  - "By numbers – Two": The right foot is raised and placed on the ground with the instep against the left heel. The left arm is brought across the body, forearm parallel to the ground, elbow against the body, hand against the base of the pistol grip with fingers extended and together and thumb on top of forefinger.
- If armed with a 7.62mm SLR, the command is also "Present ... arms" and the movement divided into two parts. The timing is "1, 2-3, 1".
  - At the first "1", the rifle is flung from the shoulder to the centre, perpendicular to the ground. The left hand is brought up and grasps the rifle just above the magazine.
  - At the second "1", the right hand moves from a pistol grip to a "goose-neck" grip above (or below) the rear sight on the small of the butt. The right foot moves to the "break step" position (behind the left foot at a 45-degree angle, the left heel inside the right instep).
- If armed with a sword, the command is "Present ... arms" and divided into two parts. Like the SLR, the timing is "1, 2-3, 1".
  - At the first "1", the sword is brought to the "recover" position (vertical, handle in front of the face 10 centimetres (3.9 in) from the mouth, guard to the left).
  - At the second "1", the sword is lowered in a sweeping motion towards the front; its tip is 30 centimetres (12 in) from the ground, with the guard on the left in line with the trouser seam.

=== Brunei, Malaysia, and Singapore ===
In the Brunei, Malaysian and Singapore Armed Forces, the command "Hormat Senja-ta!" is given. A full arms salute is given to officers with the rank of major and above. A butt salute, with presentation of the weapon and left arm at the trigger, is given to junior officers. In a sword drill, the sword is raised in front of the mouth and lowered in an eight-beat; the sword is fully pulled back.

=== China ===
There are several "present arms" commands used by the People's Liberation Army, varying by context. When a guard of honour is assembled for inspection by a head of state, the command is "向右/向左 看, 敬礼!" ("Eyes right/left, salute"). When a guard of honour is assembled for a flag-raising ceremony, the command is "向国旗, 敬礼!" ("Salute the flag"). When a guard of honour or a battalion is assembled for inspection at a military parade, the command is "敬礼!" ("Salute").

=== Finland ===
The command in the Finnish military is "Eteen – Vie!".

=== France ===
The standard weapon of the French military is the FAMAS, a short, bullpup assault rifle worn diagonally over the chest. At the command "Présentez... armes!", French military personnel place the right hand flat over the weapon's handle and take hold of the receiver with the left hand; the rifle does not move. Officers holding a sword or saber present it vertically, with the guard in front of the face. Without a weapon, a standard military salute is rendered: hand above the right eye, palm facing forward.

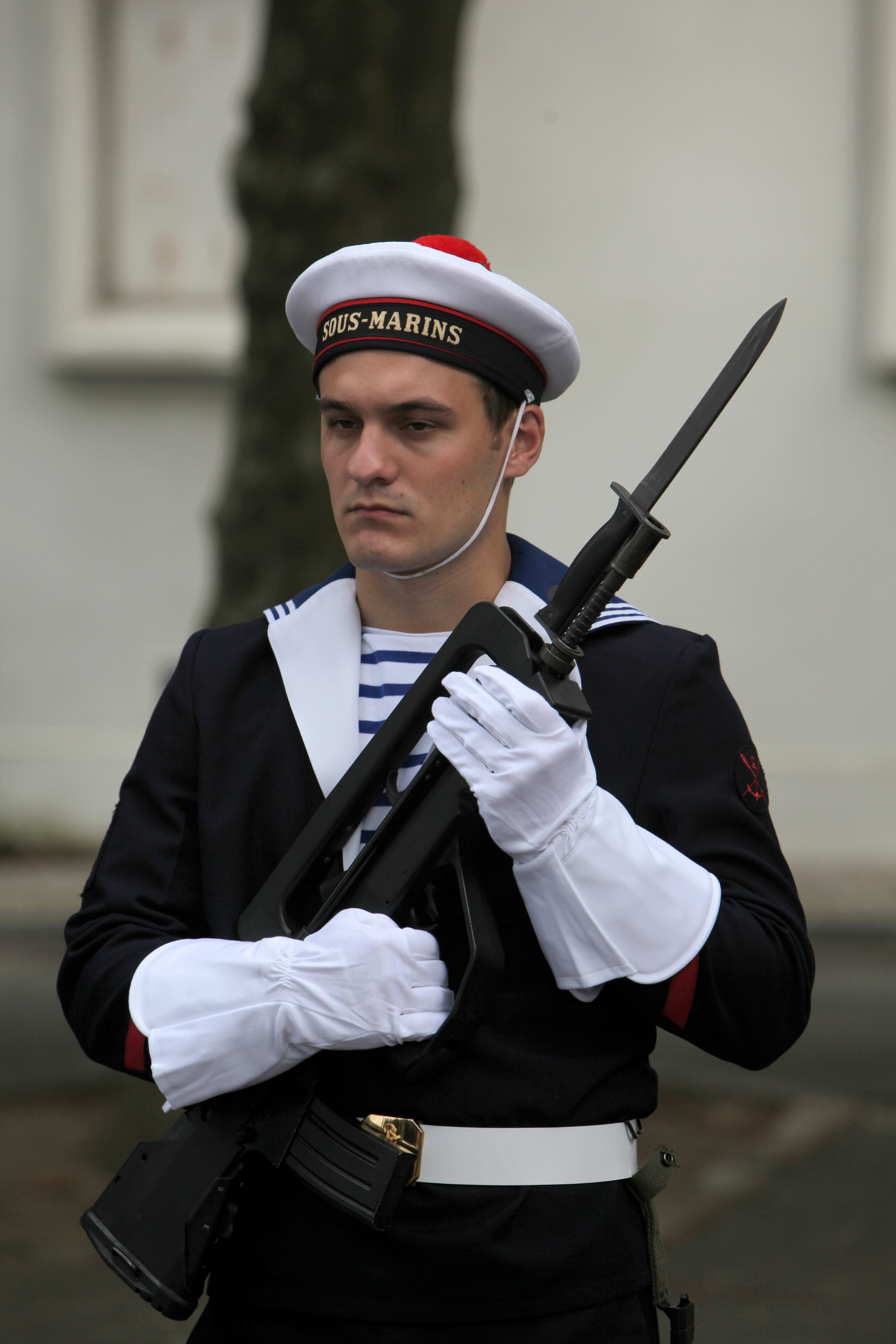
Ballistic Submarine Squadron sailor presenting arms with a FAMAS-G2

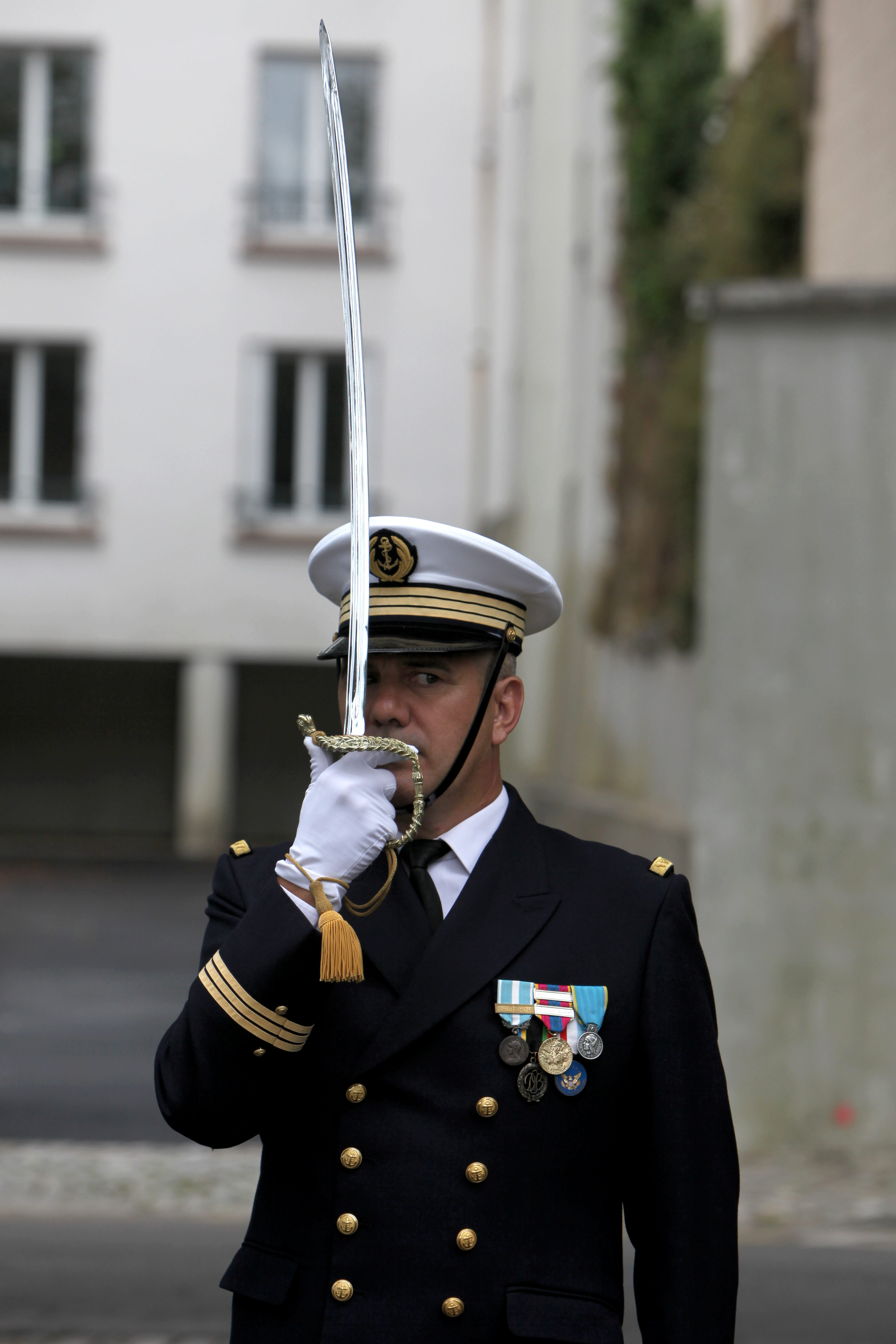
Brest Naval Base Ship-of-the-line lieutenant presenting arms with a saber

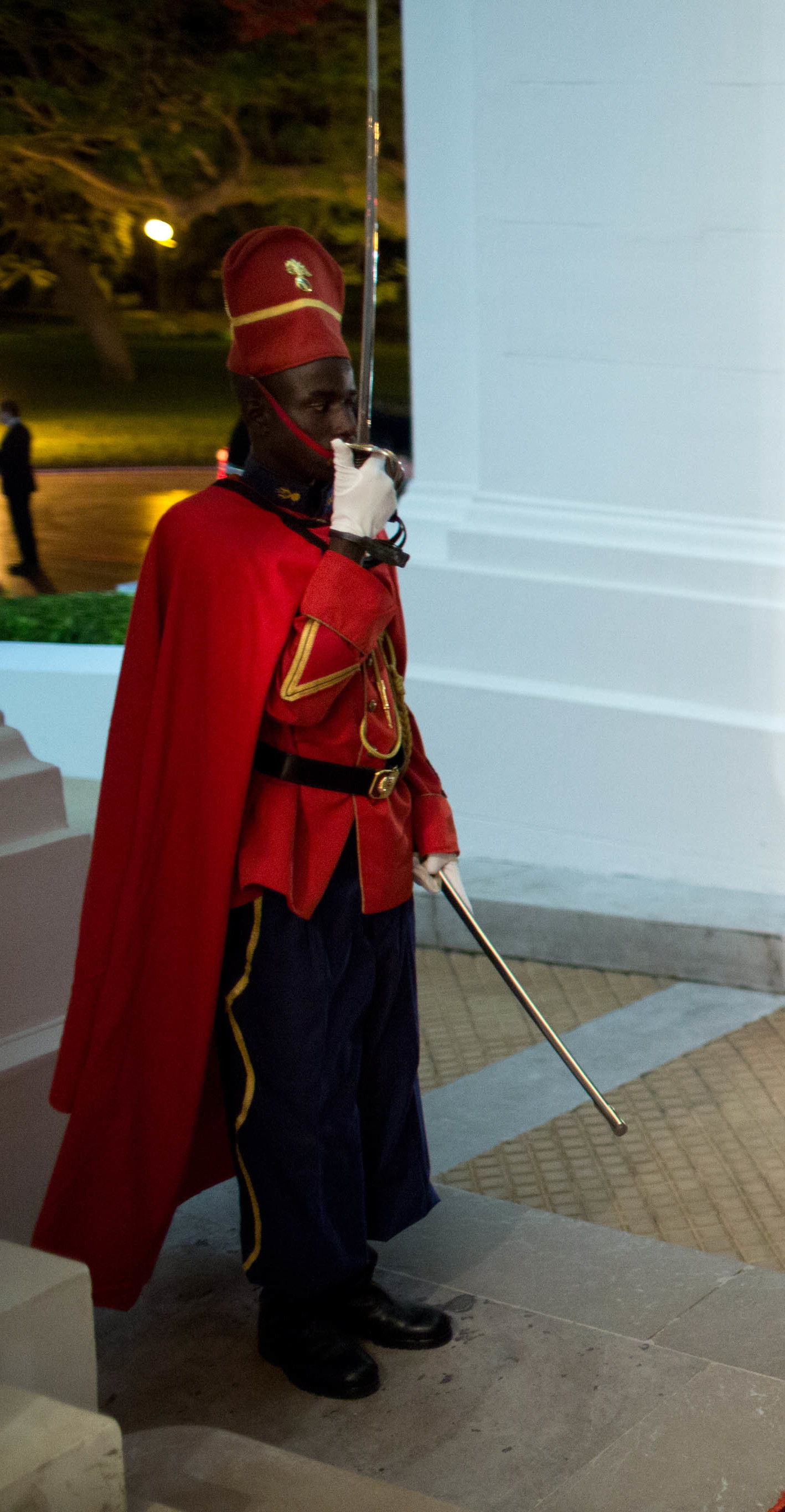
A Senegalese Red Guard presenting arms in June 2013

=== Indonesia ===
In Indonesian, the present-arms command is "Hormat Senjata, Gerak!" for personnel carrying arms. "Hormat, Gerak!" is the command for personnel not carrying arms, ordering a hand salute. For officers carrying sabres, the command is "Hormat Pedang, Gerak!"; when officers parade with men carrying rifles, the command "Hormat Senjata, Gerak!" is used. During parades, personnel carrying rifles in "slinged-port arms" position (slinged rifle in front of the body in "port arms" position) place the right hand flat over the folded stock of the rifle; the left hand holds the handguard.

Officers present arms with a sabre in two steps. They bring the sabre grip the front of the mouth with the guard facing left before lowering it to the right leg, facing the blade to the ground at a 30-degree angle to the right.

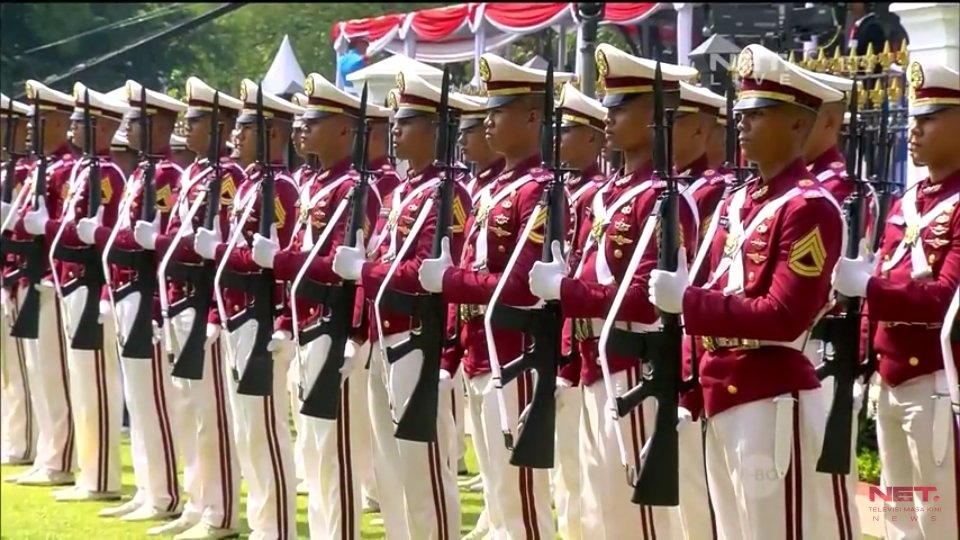
Indonesian National Police cadets presenting arms

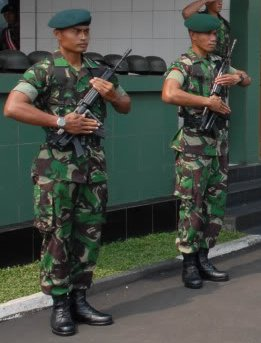
Slinged-port arms

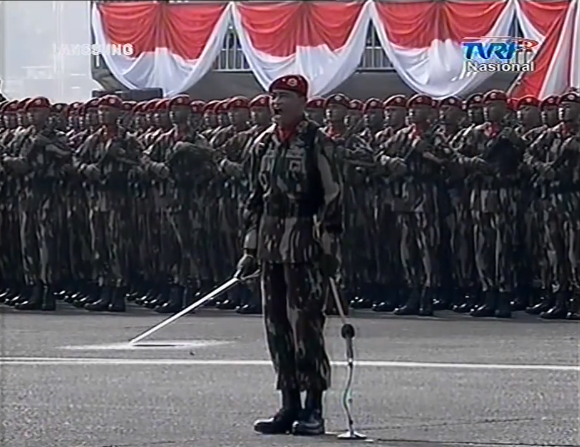
The Kopassus presenting arms during a military parade

=== Iran ===
In Iran, the command "پیش فنگ" ("pish fang") is used; the gun is held in front of the body.

=== Commonwealth of Independent States ===
In the Russian military, "Na k'rah-ool!" ("На Караул!" or "On guard!") is the present-arms command. It is preceded by "Eyes right", "Eyes left" or "Eyes front".

With an SKS rifle, arms are presented in two steps. Holding the rifle with the right hand, the hand is brought up to the head in a vertical position. The rifle is raised to the center of the chest, holding the rifle neck with the left hand. The right hand is moved to the barrel of the rifle, keeping it straight. With an assault rifle such as an AK-74M (the standard service rifle of the Russian Ground Forces), the left hand is flat over the neck of the gun and the right hand remains on the barrel. Unarmed, the right hand is brought to the right temple without touching; the head is covered.

The same format is used in the Commonwealth of Independent States (CIS), which also includes Belarus, Armenia, Azerbaijan, Kazakhstan, Kyrgyzstan, Uzbekistan, Turkmenistan and Tajikistan. Since the fall of the Soviet Union, Ukraine (not a CIS member) has executed the command like the Polish version.

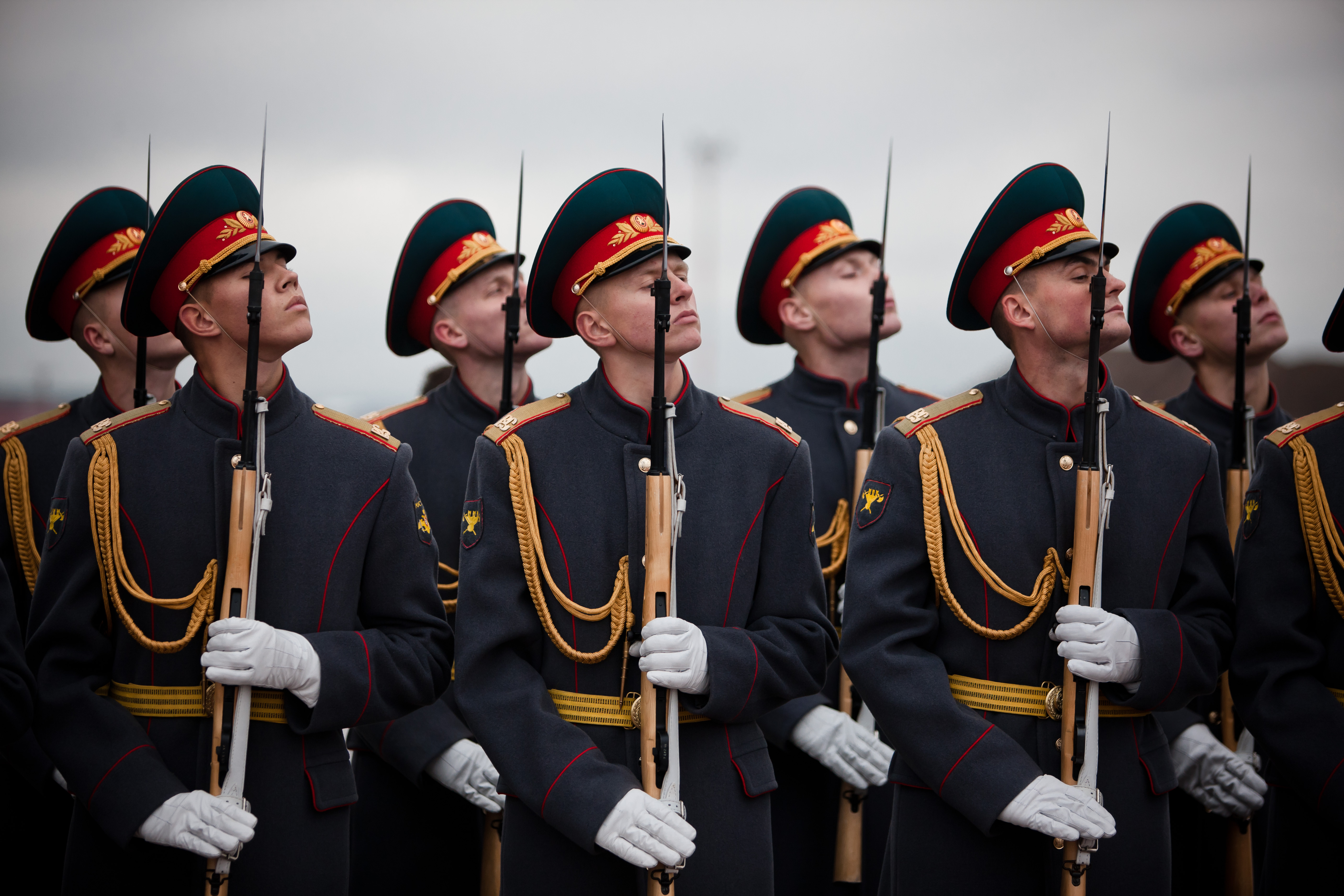
With rifles

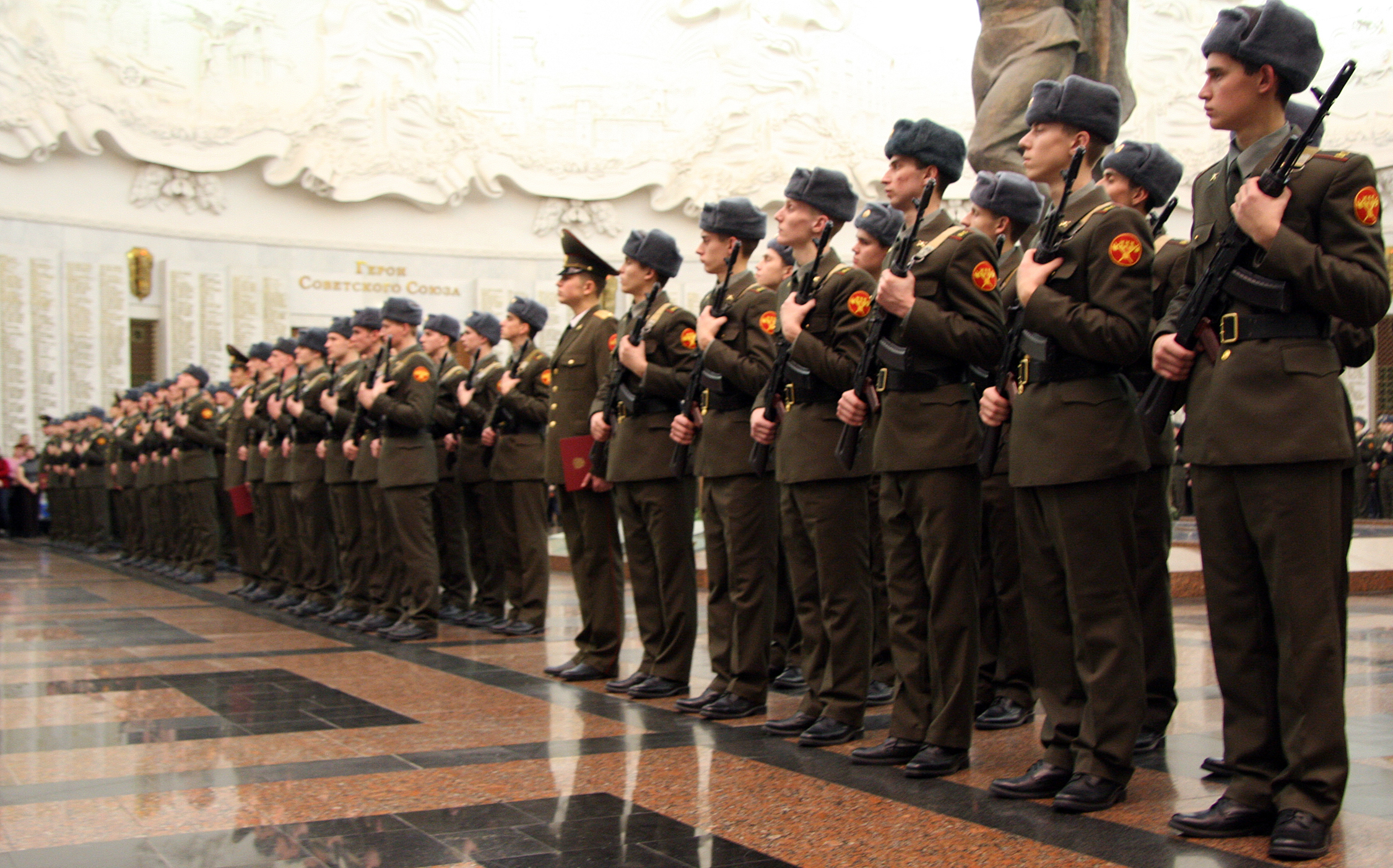
With AK-74s

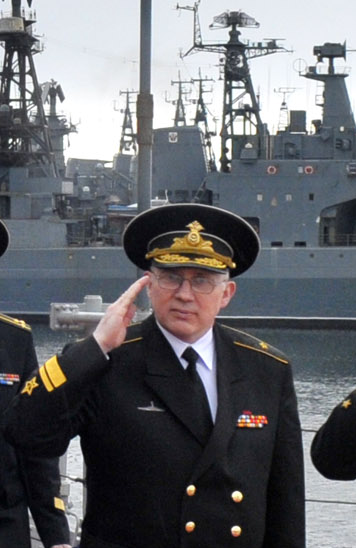
Rear Admiral Andrei Volozhinsky saluting

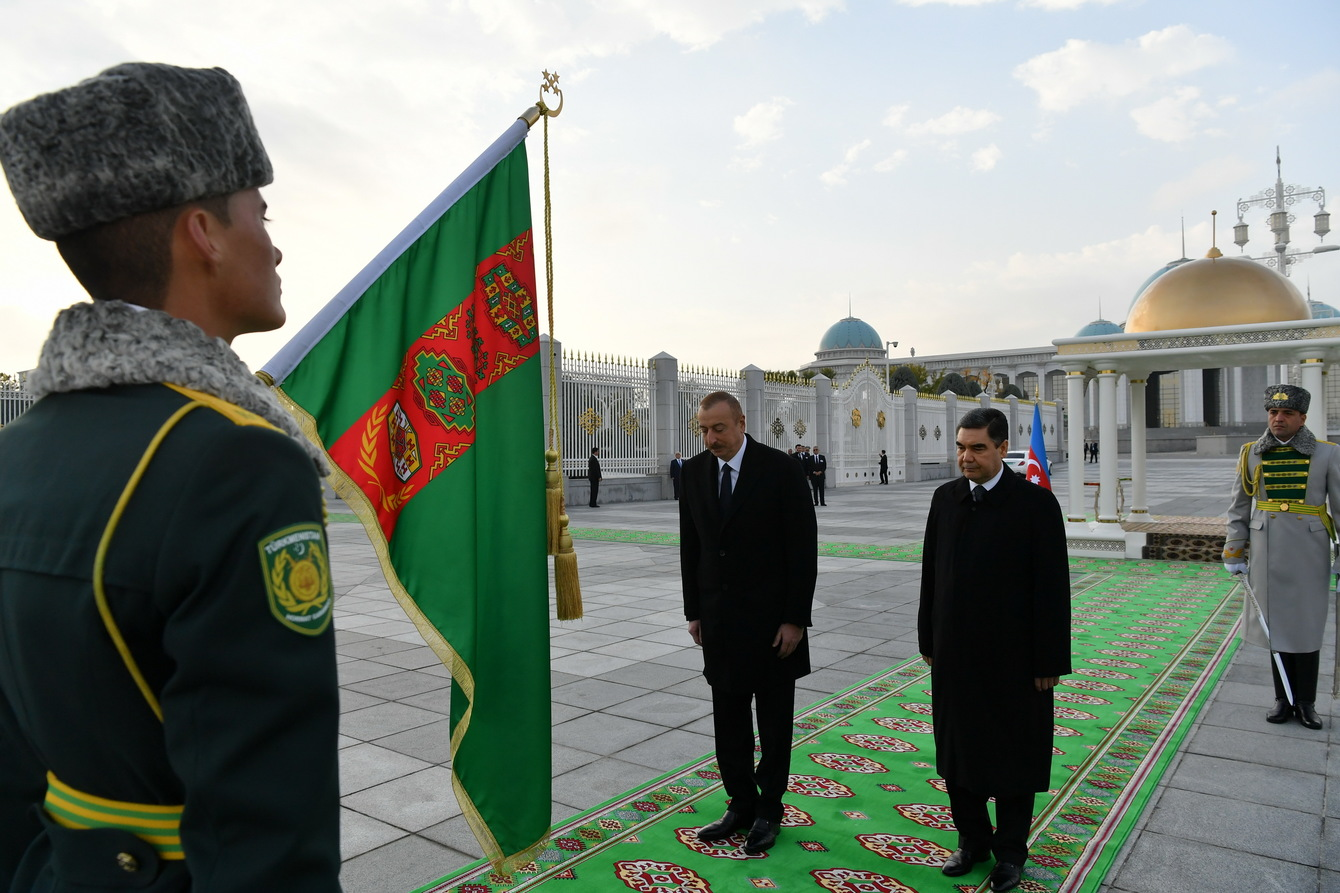
A Turkmen color guard lowering the national flag in the present-arms position for Azerbaijani president Ilham Aliyev (courtesy https://president.az/)

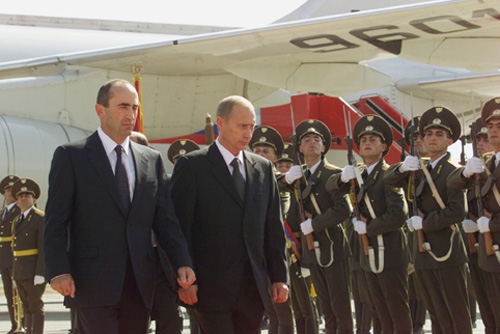
Armenian troops presenting arms with AK-47s in 2001 (courtesy http://kremlin.ru/)

=== United Kingdom ===
In the UK, arms are presented with an SA80 service weapon or a sword. With the SA80, the arms start at the sides. The right arm crosses the body to grip the butt, with the arm parallel to the ground. The right arm moves the rifle across to the center of the body, keeping it vertical with the magazine pointed out; the left hand moves 6 inches (150 mm) in front of the rifle. The rifle is lowered until the right arm is extended as possible, keeping the rifle vertical in front of the body; the left hand grips it just above the trigger guard. In the Army and the RAF the right leg is bent to 90 degrees; in all branches, the hollow of the right foot touches the heel of the left foot at a 30-degree angle.

With a sword (usually carried by officers and, sometimes, by warrant officers), presenting arms is identical to the salute at the halt. The sword is first moved up to the recover position (blade vertical and turned to the left, with the tip up and the hilt in front of the mouth) before being lowered smoothly to the front, in line with the right shoulder, with the hilt behind the thigh, blade edge to the left, and the tip about 30 centimetres (12 in) from the ground. When the command to shoulder rifles ("Shoulder ... arms!") is given, this process is reversed.

=== United States ===
In the United States military, arms are presented as follows:

- If unarmed or armed with a sidearm, a hand salute is given.
1. If armed with a firearm, the underside of the firearm is towards the one receiving the honor.
2. A guidon is lowered to the horizontal position, with the lower portion in the right armpit.
3. A sword or sabre is raised vertically or at a 30-degree angle (depending on military branch) on the first count, with the sword grip 6 inches (150 mm) in front of the neck. On the second count the sword is lowered to the right, pointing at the ground at a 45-degree angle, with the right hand (or knuckle) next to the pants seam. The edge is always on the left.

The command is given at attention only. After "Present arms", the command "Order arms" (also a two-part command) is given to return to attention.

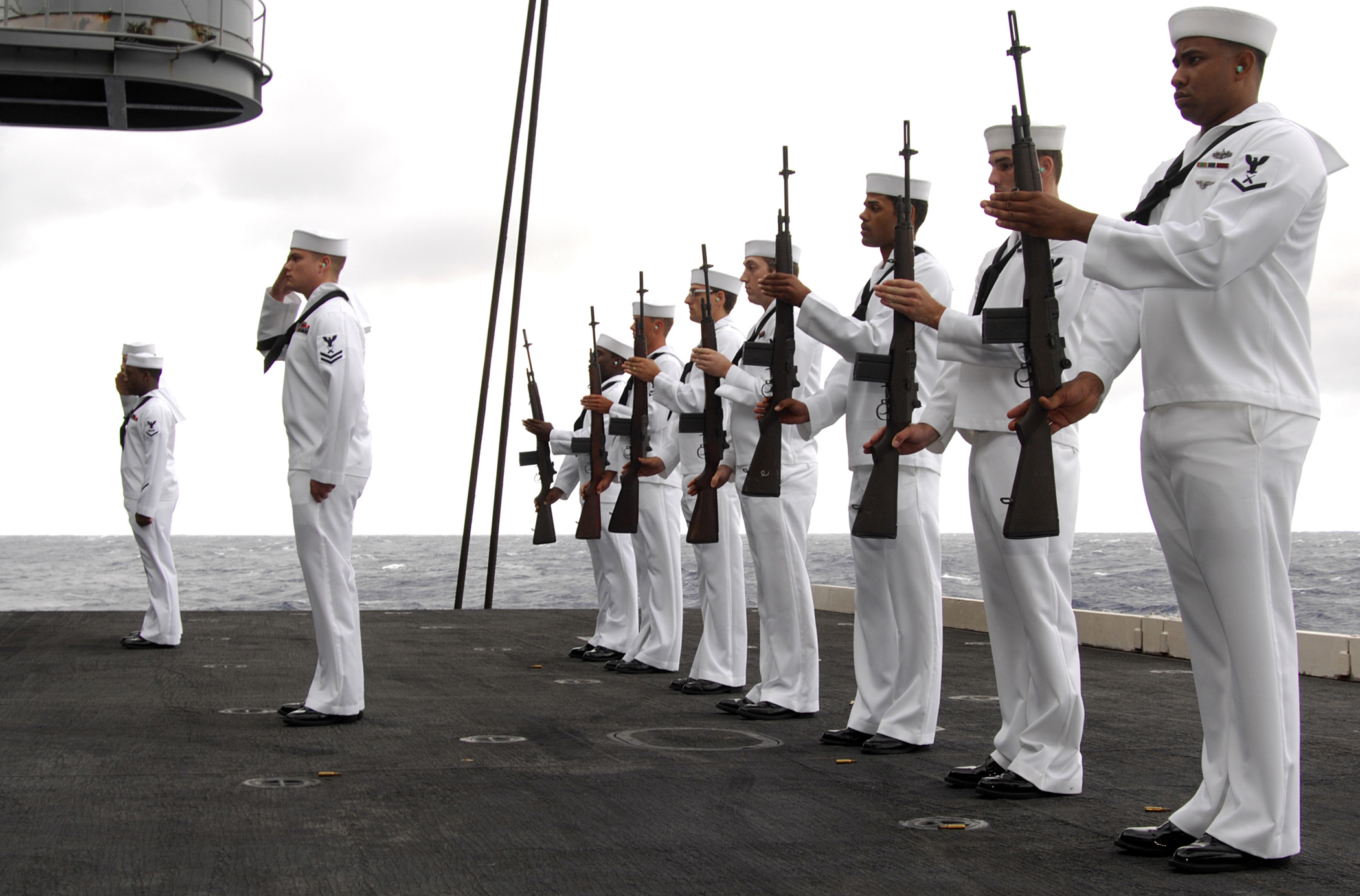
US Navy sailors presenting rifles during a burial at sea

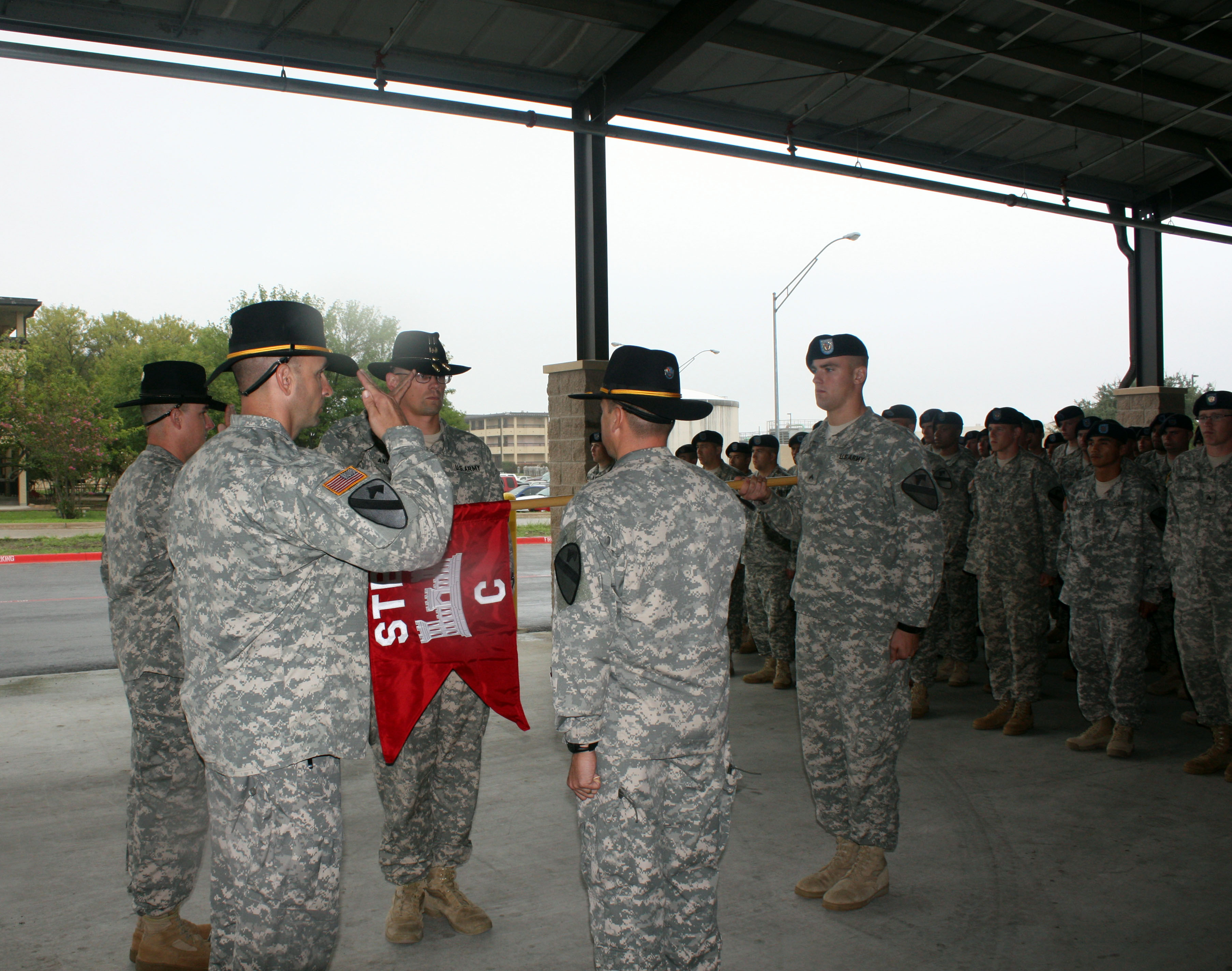
A US Army soldier presenting a guidon

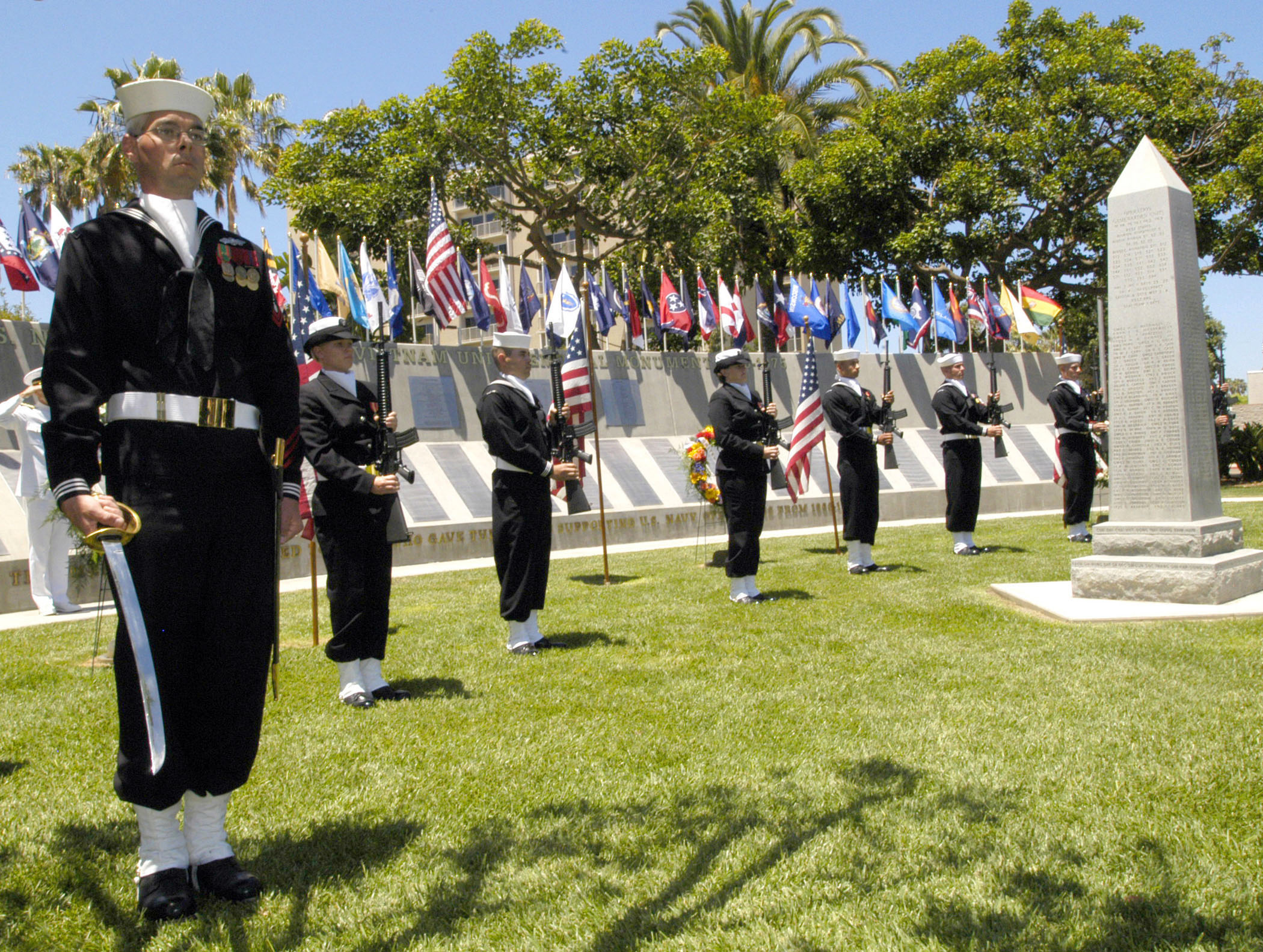
A US Navy color-guard sailor salutes with a cutlass
