= Posting the Colors =

Traditional American ceremony

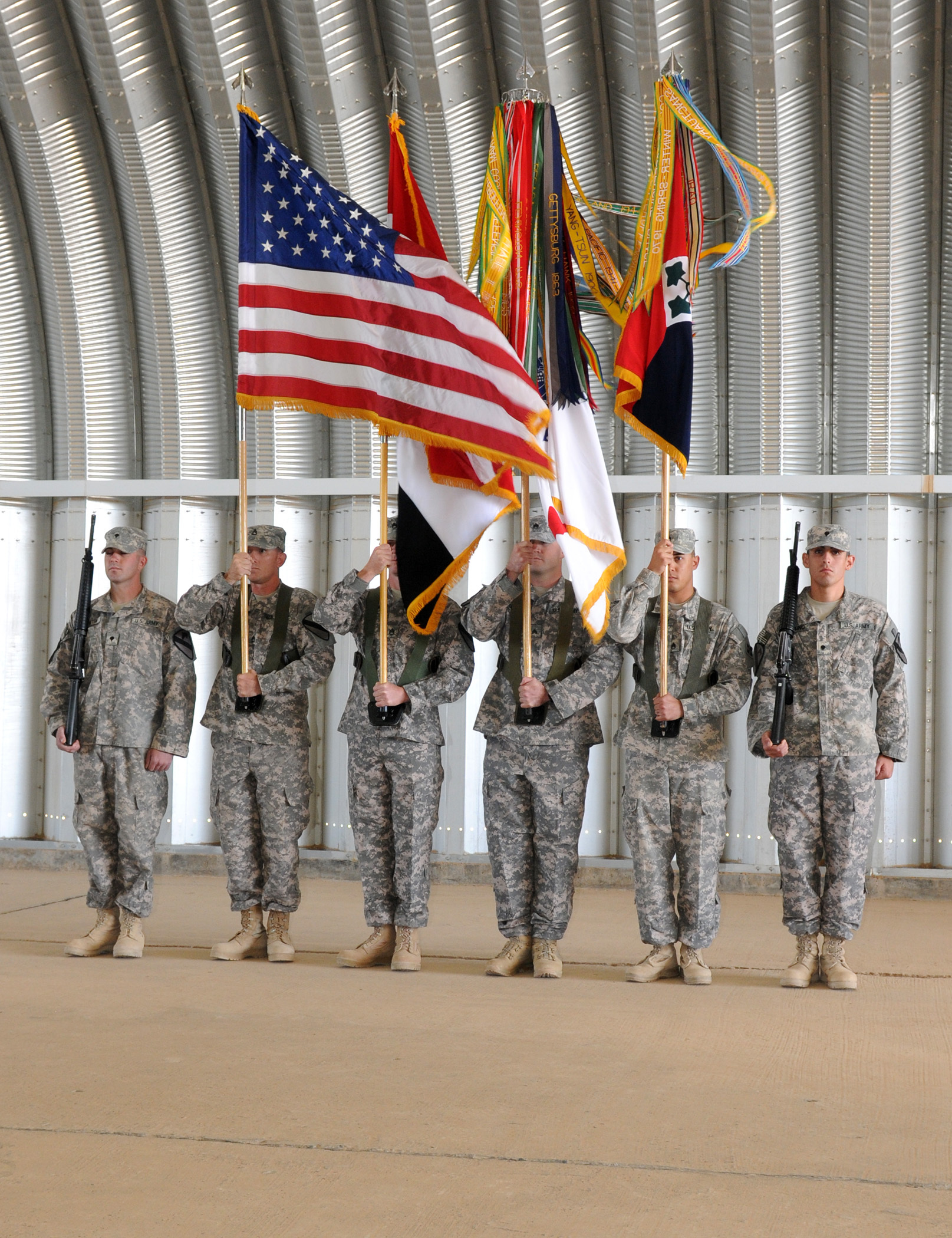
A color guard of the 4th Infantry Division preparing to post the colors

The Posting of the Colors is a practice conducted by military color guards of the United States at the beginning of a particular ceremony. The practice is also done by the Girl Scouts of the United States of America, as well as the Boy Scouts of America. Posting the colors requires that a color guard team move the colors (usually the American flag, the state flag, the service flag, and the unit flag) from a carried position and placed into a stand. This formality is normally done at events such as graduation ceremonies and public events. Specifically, it is done prior to the playing of "The Star-Spangled Banner" or the reciting of the Pledge of Allegiance. In that case, the color guard will present arms once the colors have been posted.

== See also ==
- Military colours, standards and guidons
- Presentation of Colours
- Casing of the Colors
