= Cayenne Battery =

Brazilian Army unit

The Cayenne Battery (formally, Historical Cayenne Battery – Portuguese: Bateria Histórica Caiena) of the Brazilian Army is one of three military units that comprise the Brazilian president's honor guard, the others being the 1st Guards Cavalry Regiment (Portuguese: 1º Regimento de Cavalaria de Guardas – RCG) – "Independence Dragoons" and the Presidential Guard Battalion (Portuguese: Batalhão da Guarda Presidencial – BGP).

"Cayenne Battery" was the name for the Brazilian colonial troops sent by John VI to the Portuguese conquest of French Guiana in 1809. Nowadays, it is part of 32nd Artillery Campaign Group, but falls within the 1st Guards Cavalry Regiment due to the necessity of horses. It uses horse-drawn cannons and is responsible for 21-gun salutes at special ceremonies.

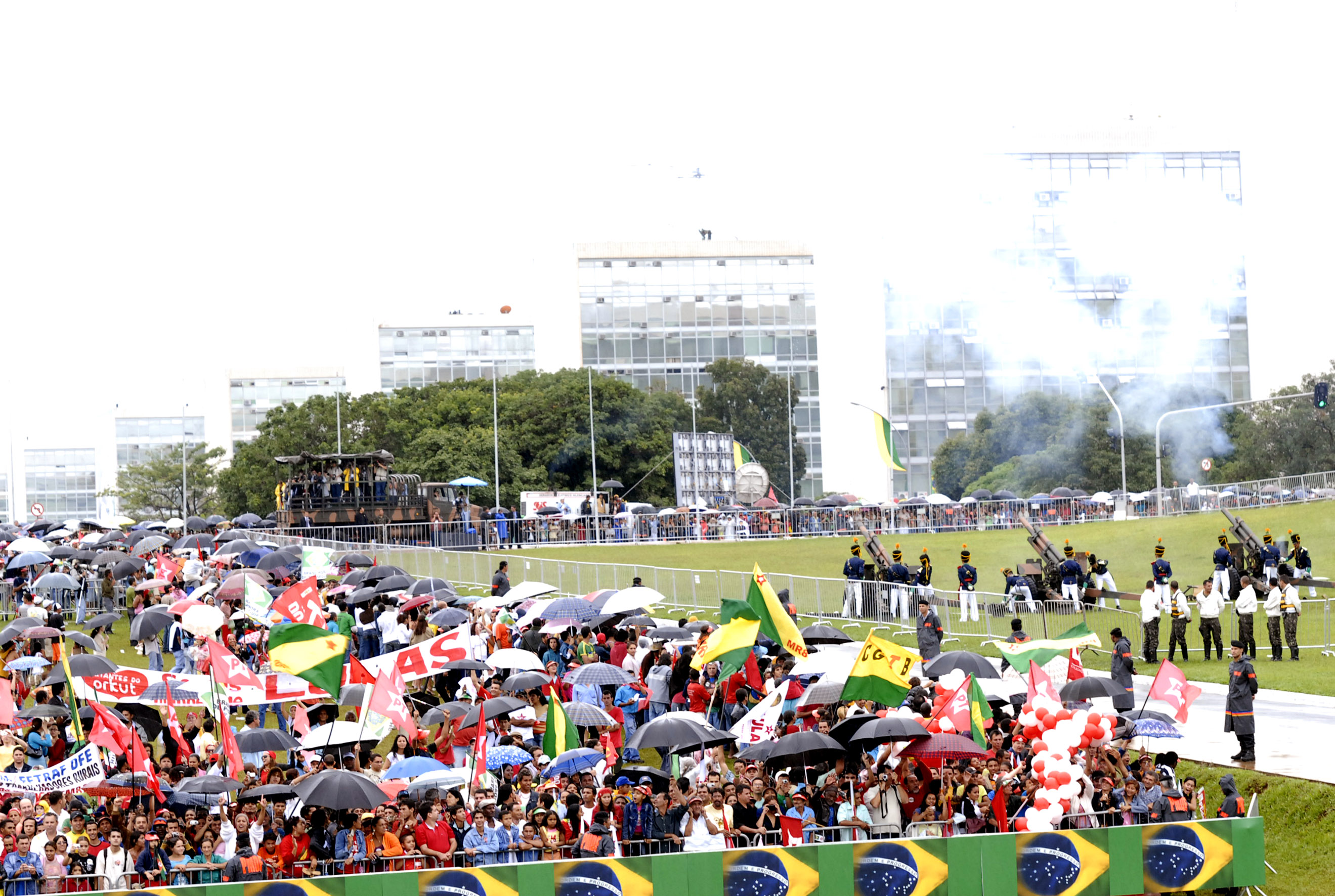
21-gun salute during the Brazilian presidential inauguration

== History ==
In 1808, Portugal's Royal Family had sought refuge in Brazil during the Napoleonic Wars. On 10 June 1808, Dom João VI declared war on France and sent 470 soldiers to French Guiana to bring support to the Royal Navy.

On 12 January 1809, these troops had conquered Cayenne, capturing Guiana`s governor. The Portuguese maintained a presence in Guiana until 1817.

In 1815, Brazil's status was elevated to The United Kingdom of Portugal, Brazil and the Algarves. The Portuguese troops in Brazil, some of which had already been previously stationed there, all united under the direct command of the Brazilian Ministry of War, and thus in honor of the victory in the Cayenne, the artillery battery which was deployed there was officially renamed as the Cayenne Battery.

== See also ==
- Artillery battery
