= Presidential Guard Battalion (Brazil) =

Division of the Brazilian army

- Batalhão da Guarda Presidencial
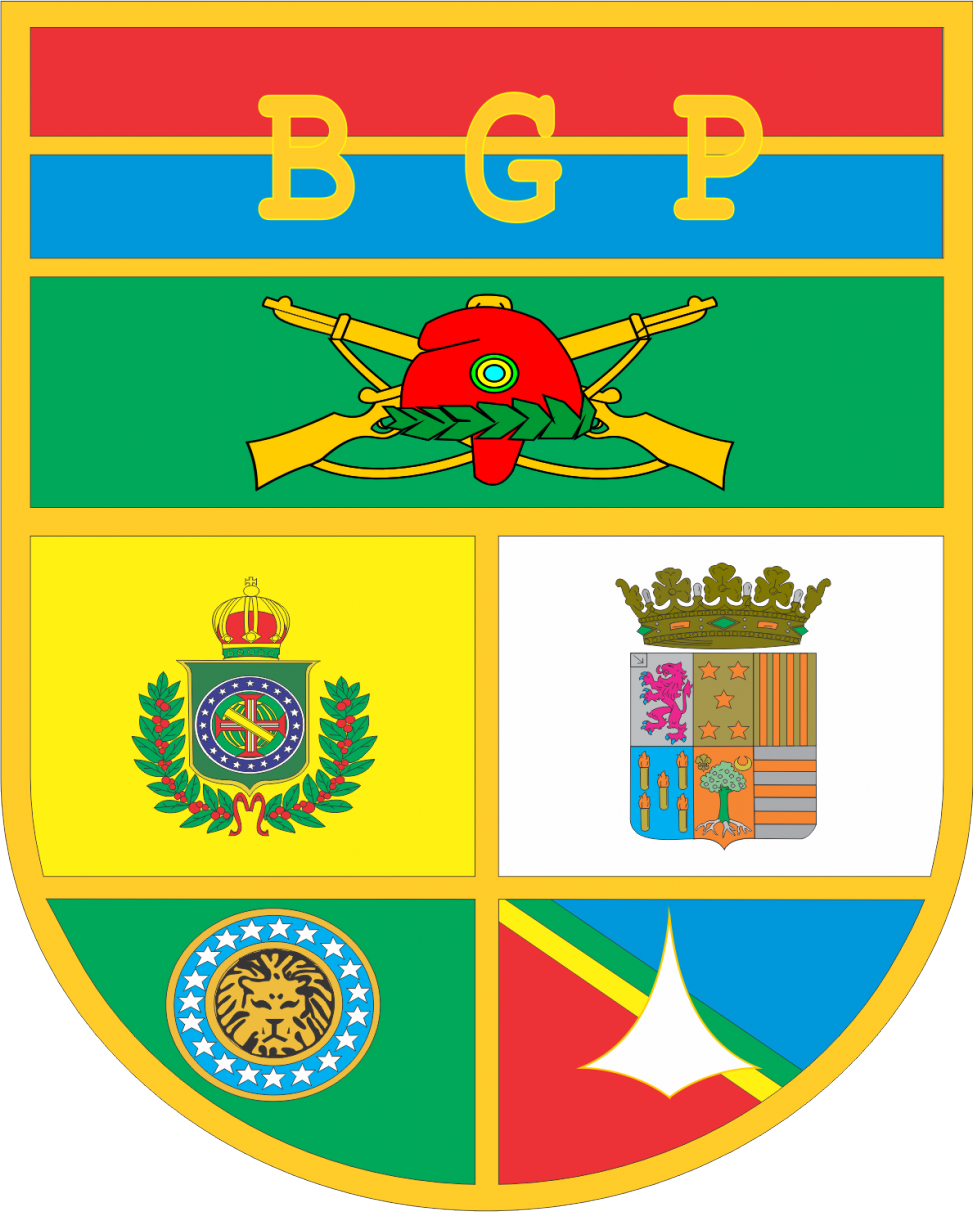
- Coat of arms of the Presidential Guard
- Active: 1960–present
- Country: Brazil
- Branch: Brazilian Army
- Type: Infantry
- Role: Honour Guard; Security
- Garrison/HQ: Brasília

Commanders
- Current commander: Col. Nélio Moura Bertolino

The Presidential Guard Battalion (Portuguese: Batalhão da Guarda Presidencial, BGP), also known as Duke of Caxias Battalion (Batalhão Duque de Caxias), or by its historical designation Emperor's Battalion (Batalhão do Imperador), is a unit of the Brazilian Army and honour guard to the President of Brazil. Two other units, the 1st Guards Cavalry Regiment (1º Regimento de Cavalaria de Guardas; RCG; also known as the "Independence Dragoons") and the Cayenne Battery, are also part of the presidential honour guard unit. It is currently a part of the Planalto Military Command.

This battalion had its origins in the Emperor's Battalion, organized in 1823 during the peace campaigns that followed the Declaration of Independence and wears its 19th-century uniforms.

== History ==
After Portugal's Crown Prince Pedro had proclaimed the independence of Brazil from Portugal, on 7 September 1822, some troops remained loyal to Portugal. To guarantee national independence, these troops had to be defeated. To fight the troops in Bahia, Pedro established in 1823 the Emperor's Battalion. In 1825, the Emperor's Battalion was sent to Montevideo to fight in the Cisplatine War. After Pedro's abdication, the Emperor's Battalion was disbanded, as all other troops directly subordinated to them. On 7 April 1933, President Getúlio Vargas established the Guards Battalion to protect the government's palaces. The decree determined that this battalion was the heir to Emperor's Battalion and its traditions and would use its uniforms - blue polo and white pants with a shako, boots and a brown belt - at special ceremonies and celebrations. On 6 April 1960, with the transfer of the national capital from Rio de Janeiro to Brasília, the unit changed its name to today's Presidential Guard Battalion. The most important officer of the Presidential Guard Battalion was the 2nd Lieutenant Luís Alves de Lima e Silva, the Duke of Caxias and the Patron of the Army. Thus, its nickname is Battalion of the Duke of Caxias in his honour.

== Present day ==
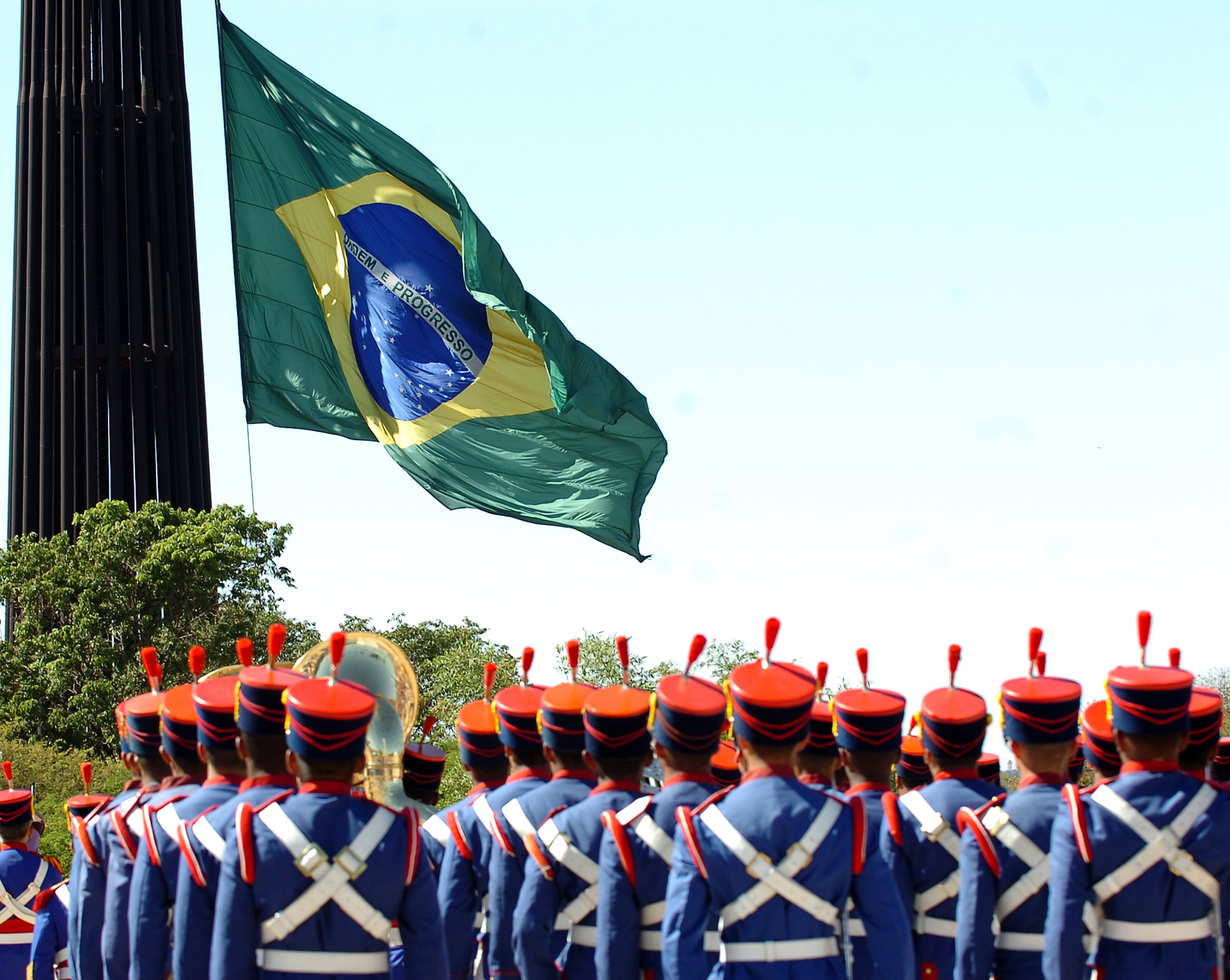
Men of the Presidential Guard Battalion oversee the monthly hoisting ceremony of the Brazilian Flag located in the Three Powers' Square.

Its purpose is to protect the President of the Federal Republic of Brazil, as well as guard the premises of the main palaces of the President of the Republic and some army installations. The following 4 are the main buildings that the BGP protects in its everyday duties.

- Alvorada Palace
- Palácio do Planalto
- Palácio do Jaburu
- Granja do Torto

Another more notable role the BGP plays is giving military honours to the national and foreign authorities in the Federal Capital of Brasília during state visits, inaugural ceremonies and awards ceremonies. It always oversees, alternately with the other service branches, the monthly hoisting ceremony of the Brazilian Flag located in the Three Powers' Square and takes part in the Independence Day ceremonies as one of the first/main units in those events. It participates in the ceremonial of the Presidency of the Republic and. It maintains a company-sized military band known as the BGP Music Band which is short for Banda Musical do Batalhão da Guarda Presidencial (Presidential Guard Battalion Music Band). It came into existence in 1933 when President Vargas established a music band to complement the reestablished Guards Battalion, having originally 35 musicians. The Band of Music of the BGP today have over 93 military musicians in its ranks who march in the uniform of the BGP. The Brazilian Army Marching Band and Pipes and Drums, which was formed in 2016 and is the newest musical formation within this service branch, reports both to the battalion HQ as well as to Army Headquarters, wearing an all-white uniform as opposed to the blue of the battalion band. The band is also the sole band in the Brazilian Army to include both a pipe band section and a drum corps being the second one in the Brazilian Armed Forces next to the Brazilian Marine Pipes, Drum and Bugle Corps. It is currently under the command of First Lieutenant Manuel Nunes Ferreira, the unit's bandmaster.

== Gallery ==
=== Honour guard ===
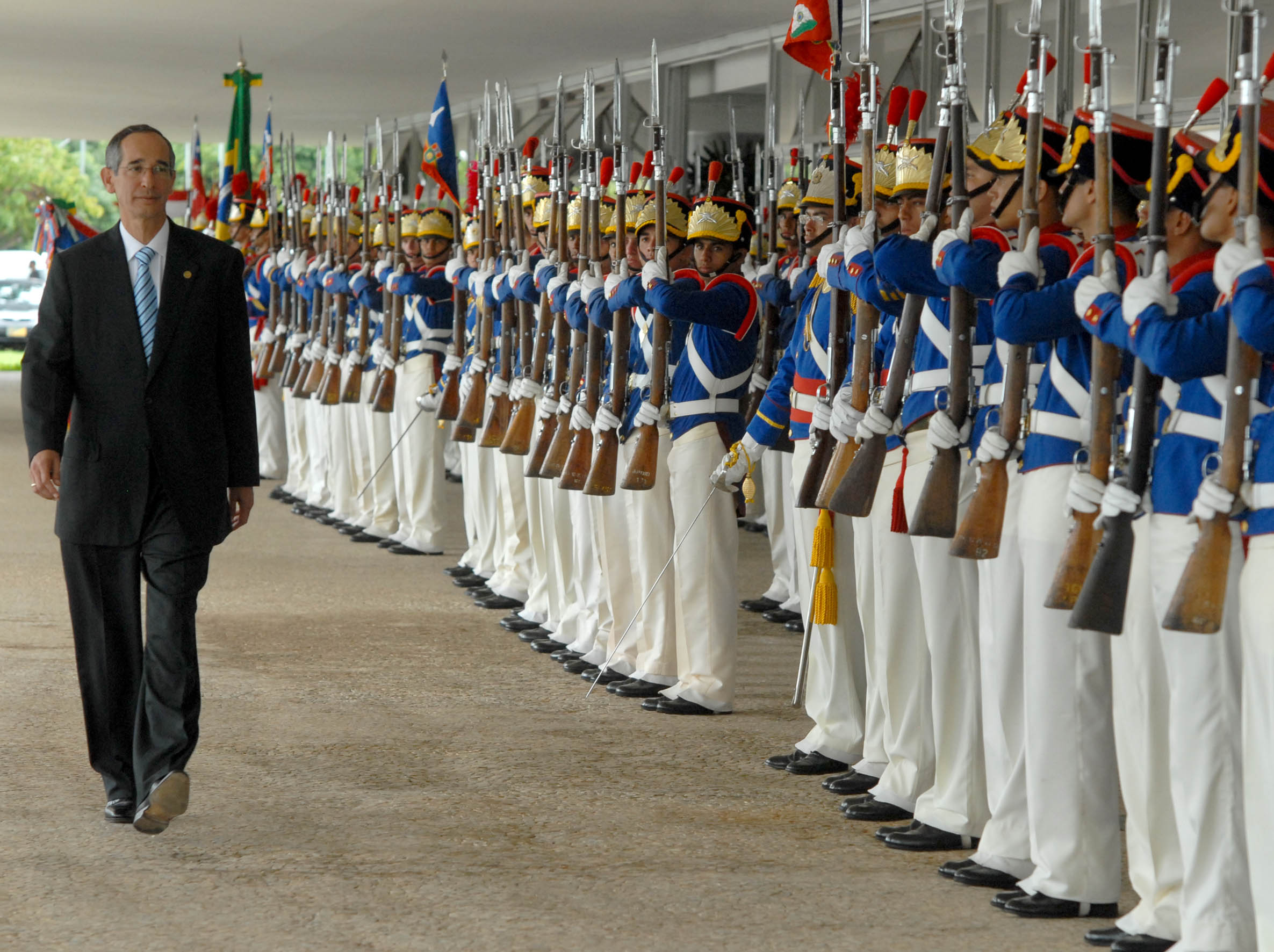
President Álvaro Colom Caballeros of Guatemala

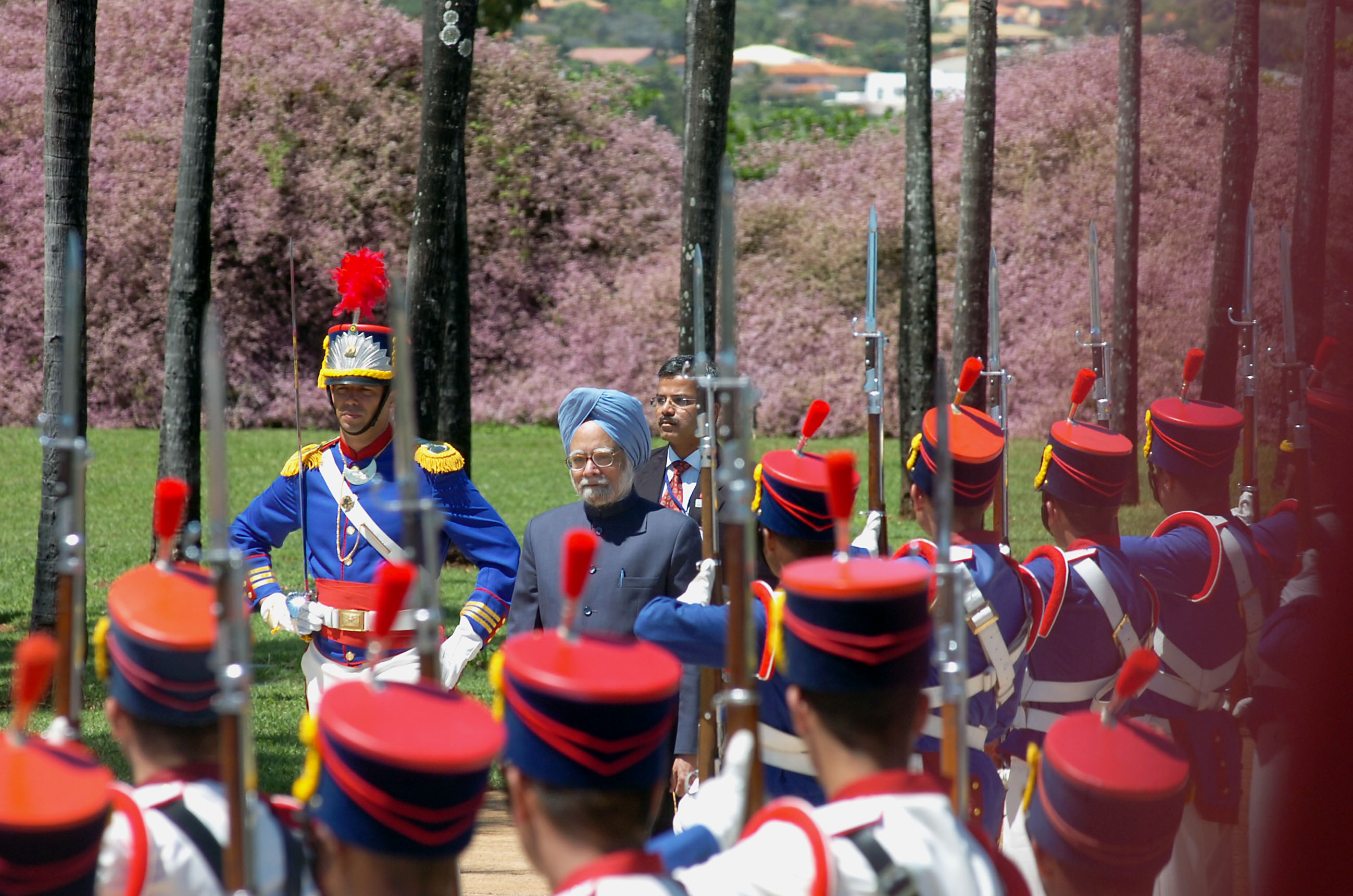
Prime Minister Manmohan Singh of India

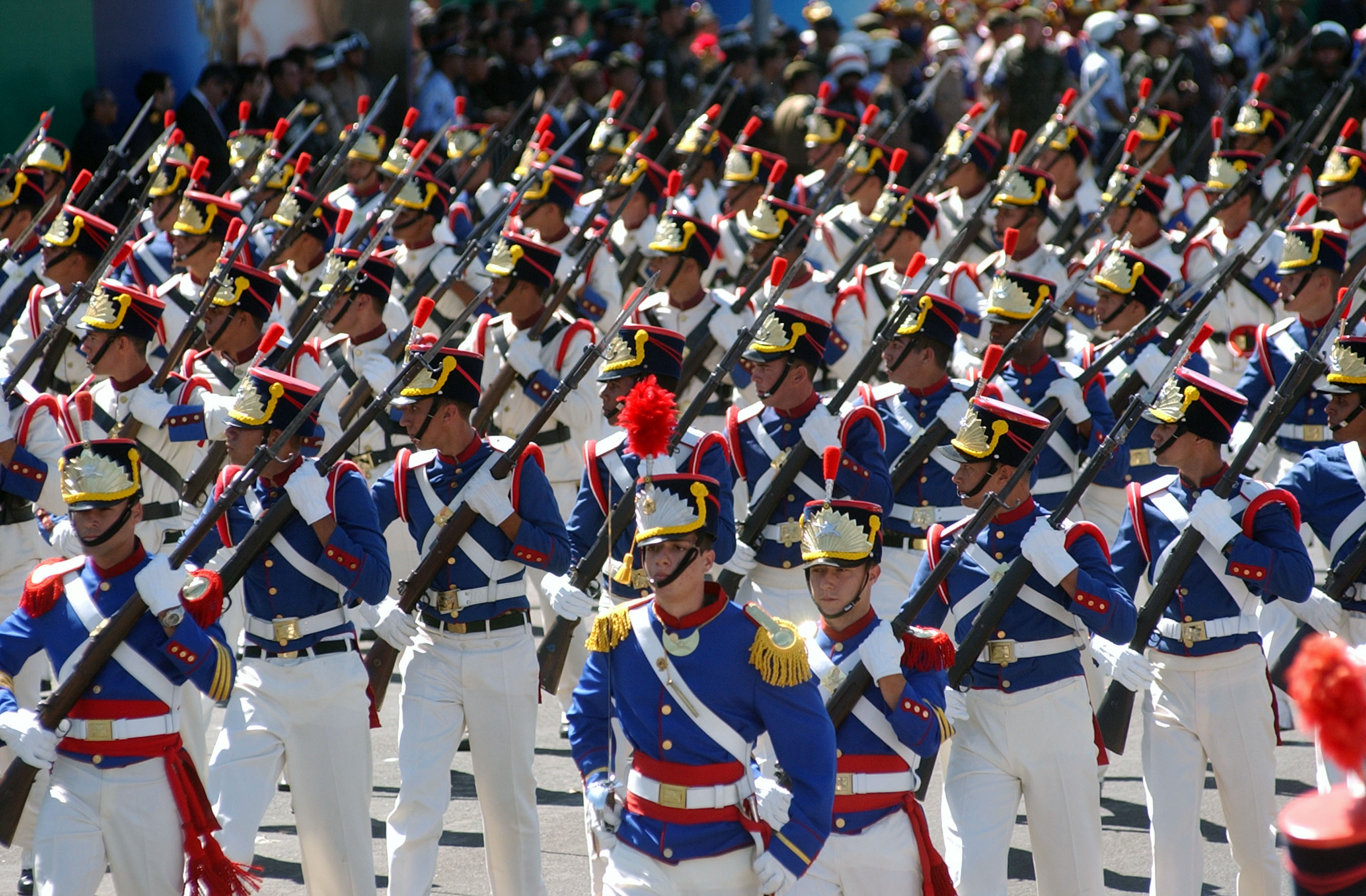
The Presidential Guard at the Independence Day military parade.

=== BGP Band ===
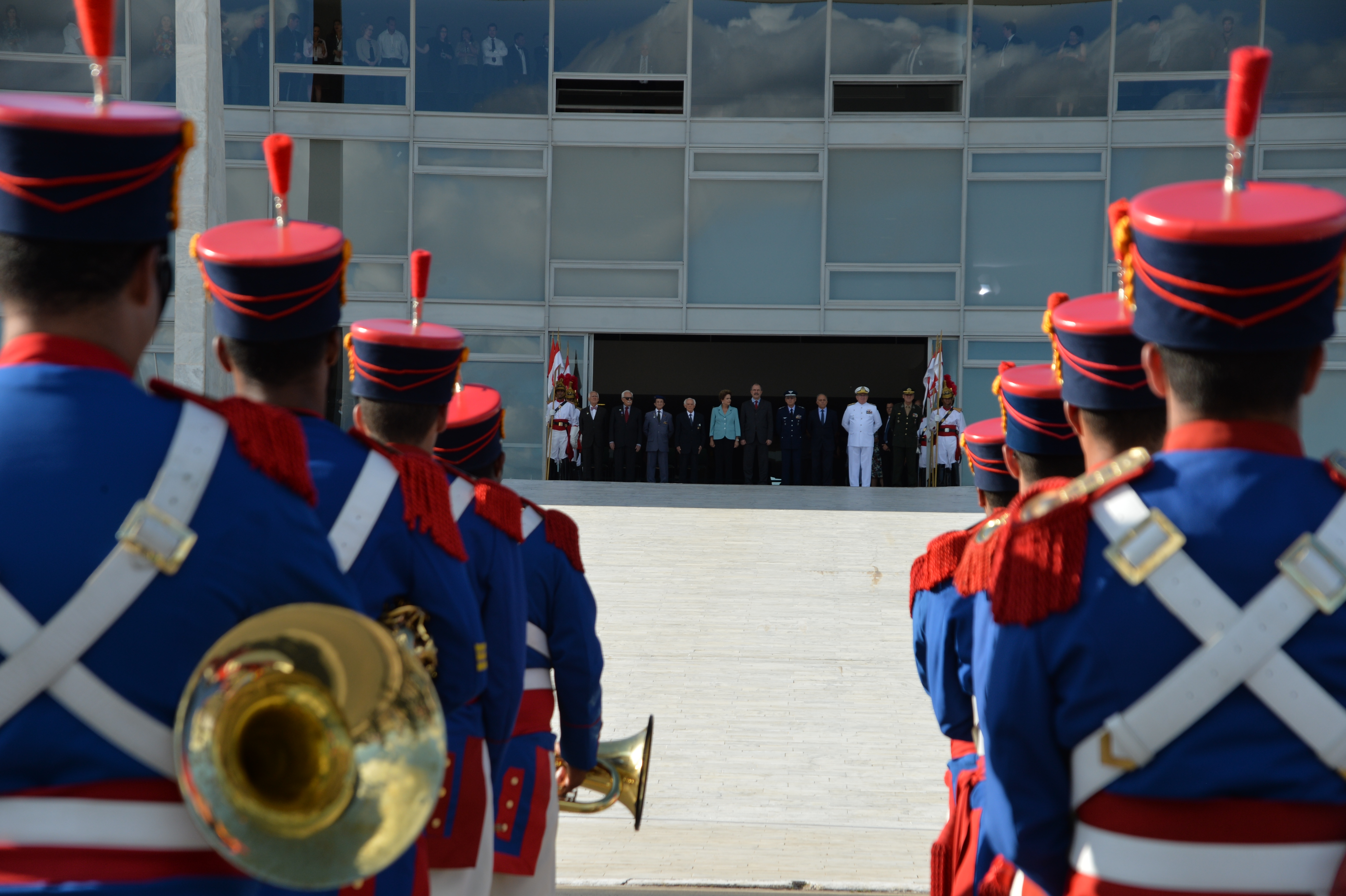
The BGP Band during the victory day celebrations in 2015.

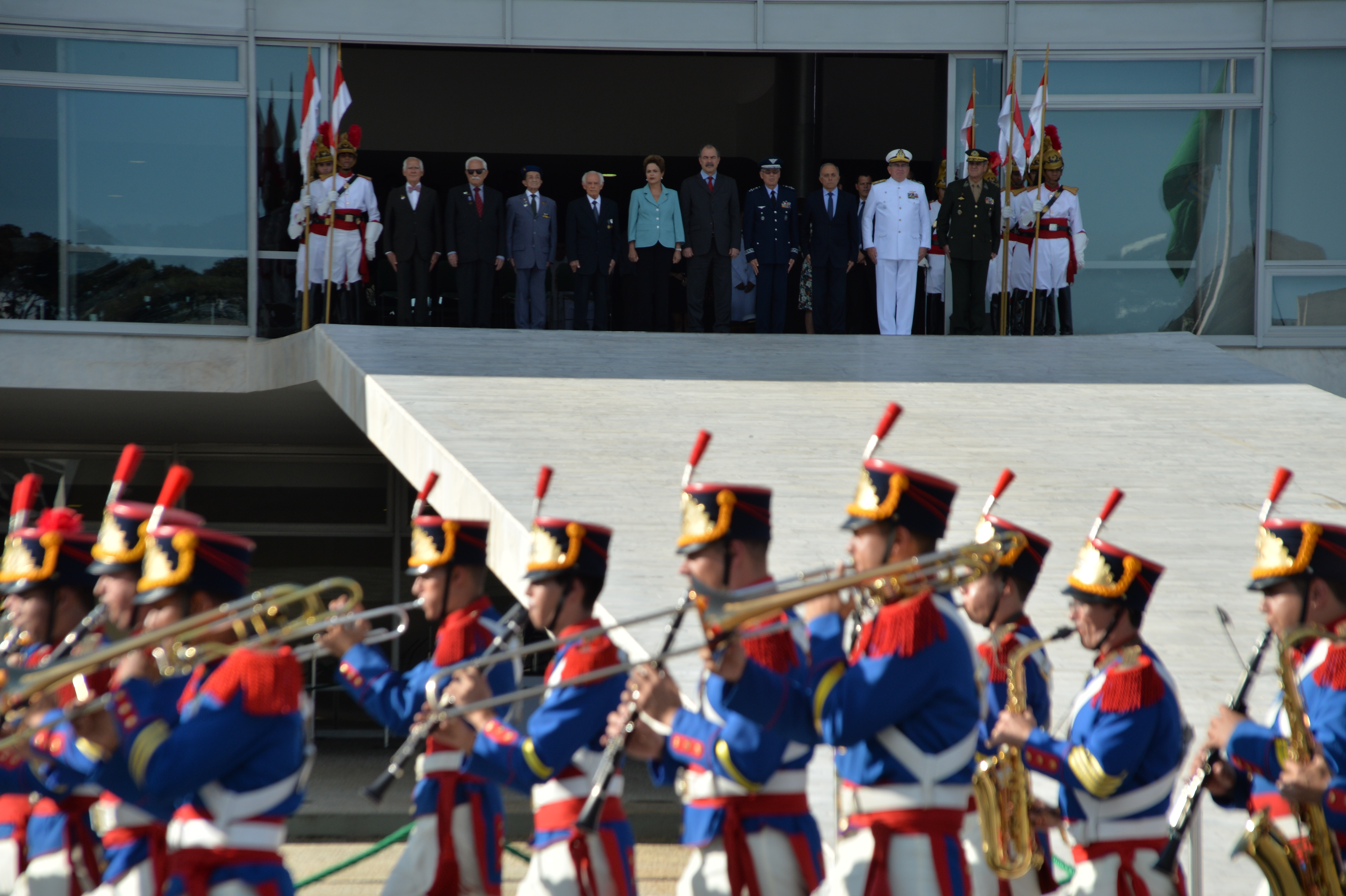
The BGP Band marching in front of the Palácio da Alvorada
