= Planalto Military Command =

- Comando Militar do Planalto
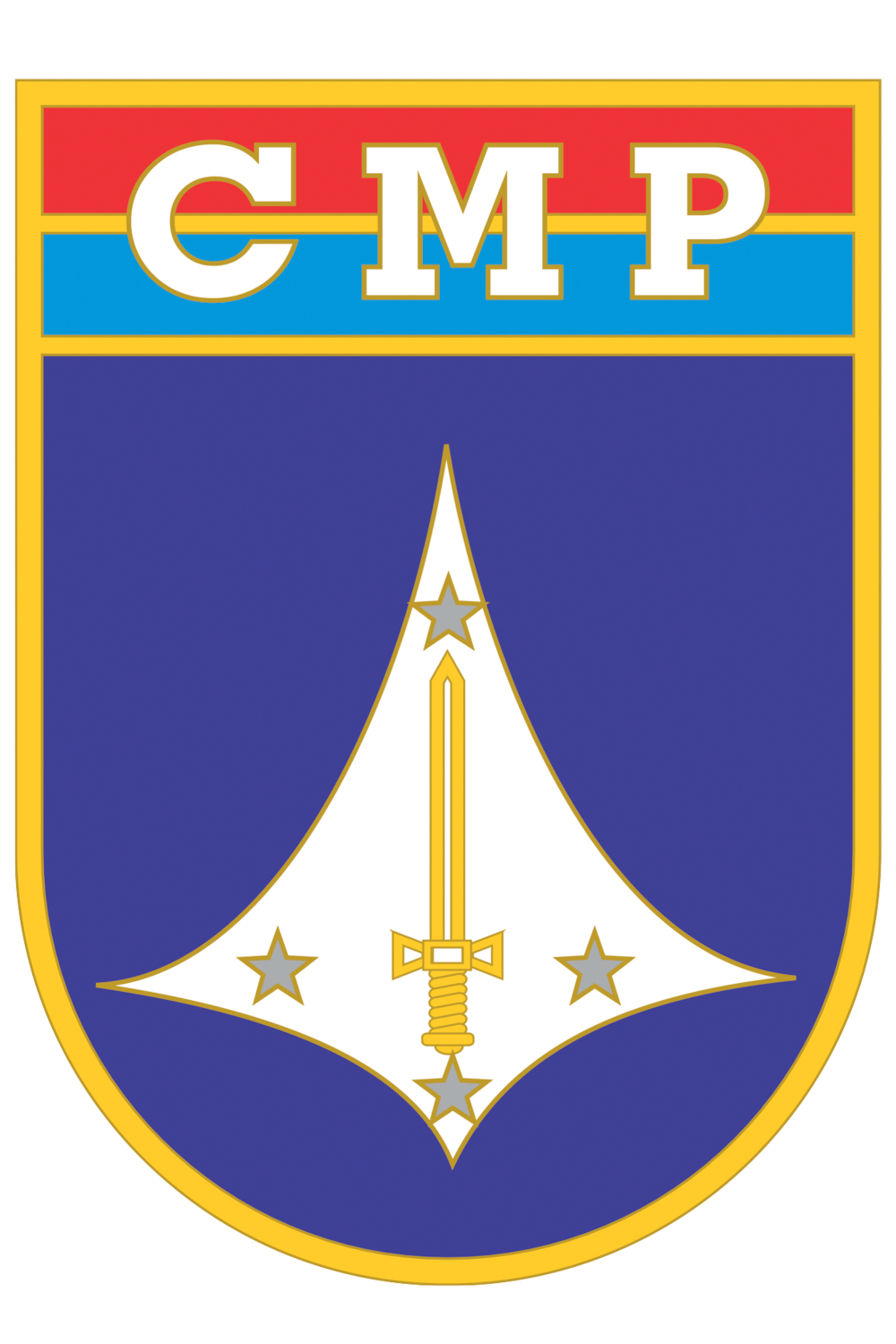
- Emblem of the Planalto Military Command
- Active: 1960; 66 years ago
- Country: Brazil
- Branch: Brazilian Army
- Part of: Ministry of Defence
- Garrison/HQ: Brasília
- Nickname: CMP
- Website: www.cmp.eb.mil.br

The Planalto Military Command (Portuguese: Comando Militar do Planalto or CMP, (Note: Planalto is Portuguese for high plain)) is one of the eight Military Commands of the Brazilian Army. The Planalto Military Command is responsible for the defense of the state Goiás, most of the state of Tocantins, the Federal District with the capital Brasília, and the Triângulo Mineiro region of the state of Minas Gerais.

== Overview ==
The country’s central plateau location is convenient for the deployment of rapid-reaction forces to other regions, which justifies the presence of the Special Operations Command. The Army Artillery Command oversees the batteries of Astros multiple-launch rocket systems. Within the capital, the Presidential Guard Battalion and the 1st Cavalry Guard Regiment (1.º RCG) are responsible for the security of the Palácio do Planalto, the workplace of the President of Brazil. The proximity of the Planalto Military Command to the seat of national political power has, at various points in history, rendered its commanders politically significant. Its forces fought against the Sergeants' Revolt in Brasília in 1963, and the command coordinated part of the operations against the Araguaia Guerrilla movement in the following decade.

== Structure ==
Area of the Comando Militar do Planalto 2017

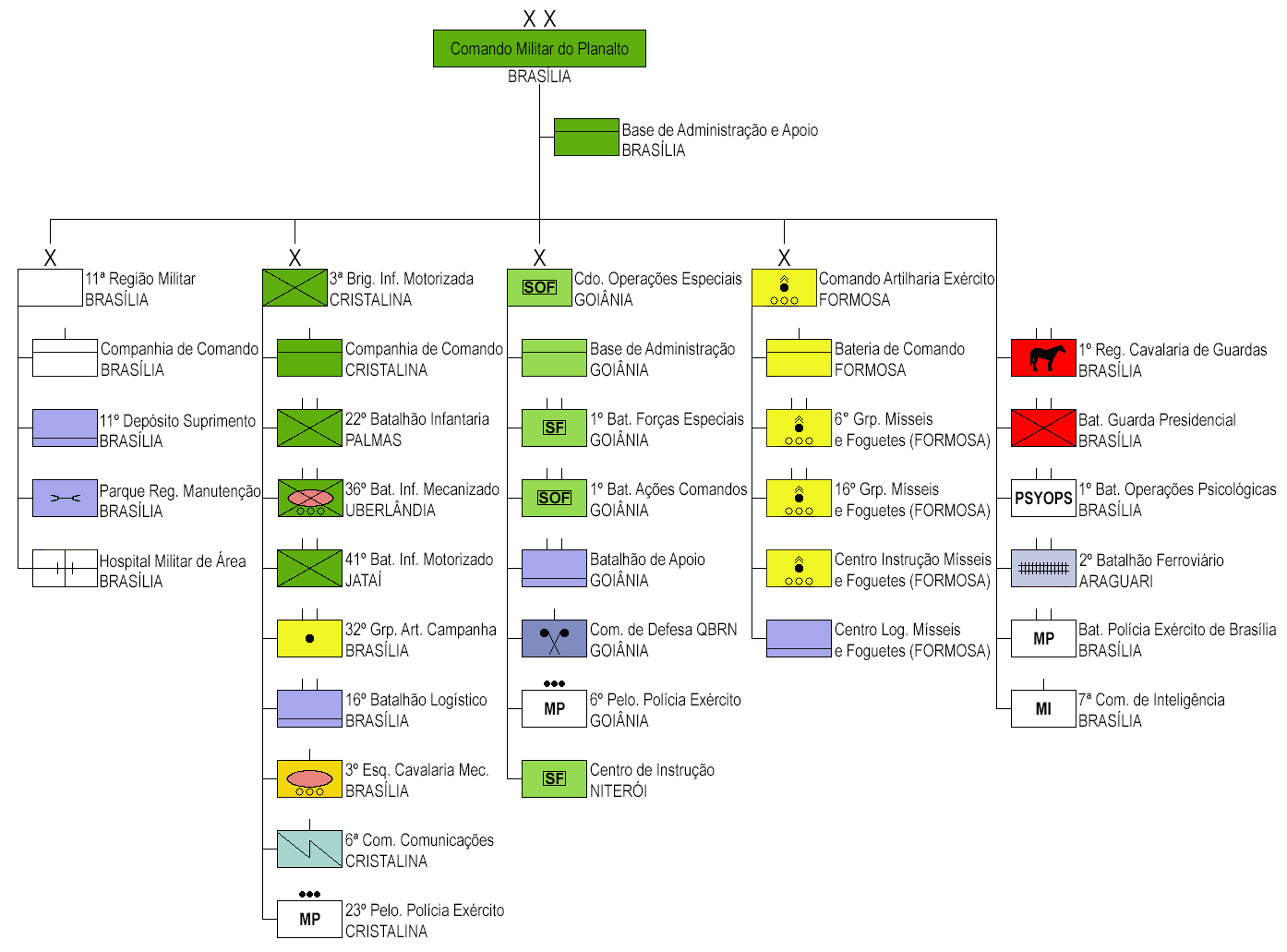
Structure of the Comando Militar do Planalto 2017 (click to enlarge)

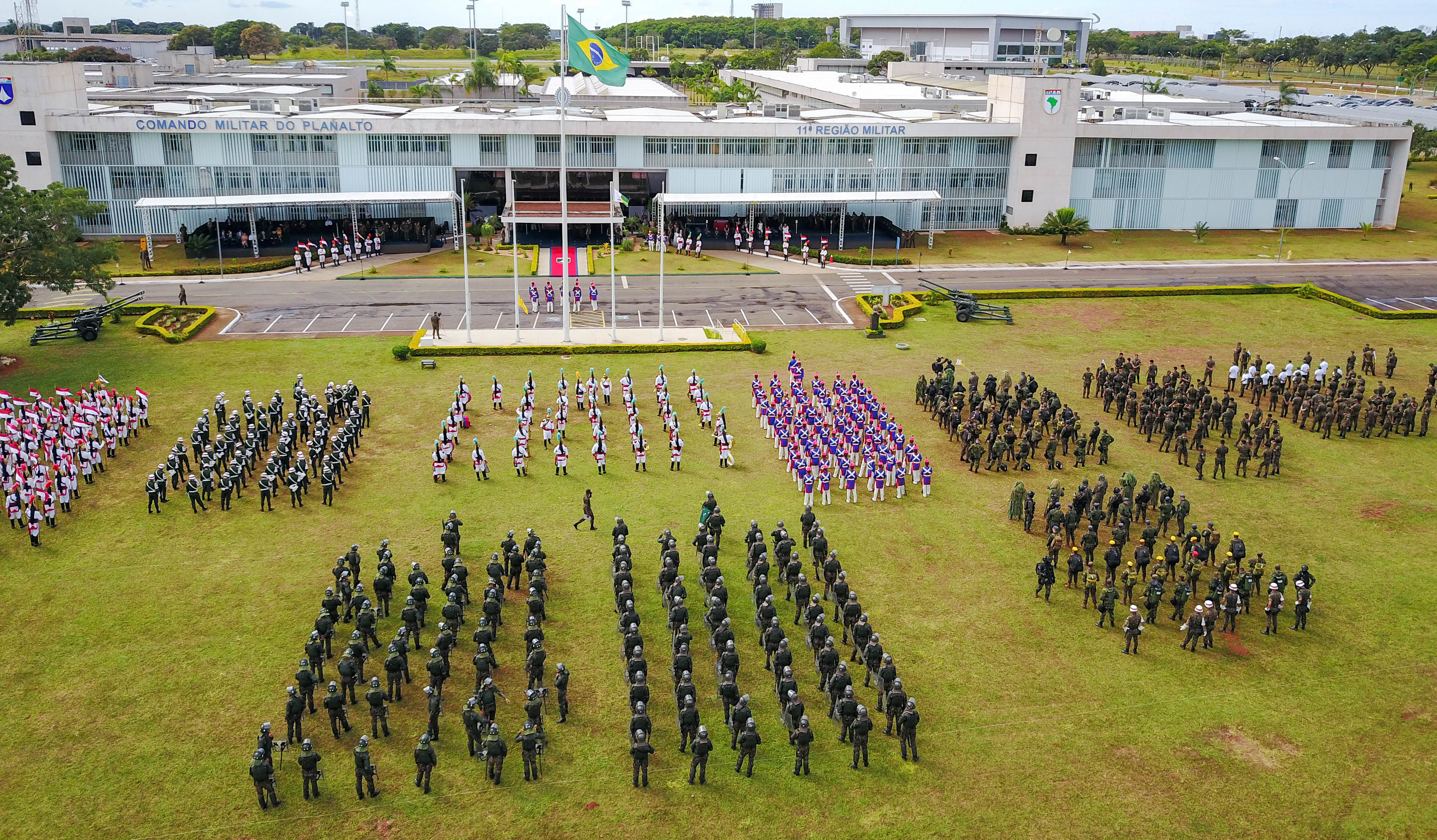
Presentation of the troops at the Planalto Military Command headquarters

Shortly after the inauguration of Brasília as the new federal capital in 1960, Army units located in the Federal District, Goiás (which then included present-day Tocantins), and the Triângulo Mineiro region of Minas Gerais were placed under the authority of the Brasília Military Command. The Brasília Military Command was disbanded in 1967 but was re-established under its current name in 1969. Its jurisdiction coincides with that of the 11th Military Region (RM); the two commands were held concurrently until the 11th Military Region gained autonomy in 1994. The 11th Military Region is responsible for logistical, administrative, and territorial support. The "Bico do Papagaio" region, in the far north of Tocantins, has shifted between the jurisdictions of the 11th and 8th Military Regions several times; it currently falls under the Northern Military Command.

Three security units were established in Brasília during this period: the Presidential Guard Battalion (BGP) in 1960, the Brasília Army Police Battalion (BPEB) in 1962, and the 1st Guards Cavalry Regiment (1st RCG, known as the "Dragons of Independence") in 1968. The BGP and the 1st RCG take turns guarding the Palácio do Planalto—the workplace of the President of the Republic—and may be reinforced by the Military Police. While they are well-known for their historical-style uniforms, they also maintain riot-control units capable of responding to demonstrations. The BGP’s role in securing the seat of political power makes its command a strategic position. In practice, it operates under a dual command structure, as it can also be mobilized by the Institutional Security Bureau. The BPEB, which serves as the Military Police unit for the CMP area, is a constant presence in the public spaces of the Urban Military Sector (Portuguese: Setor Militar Urbano), a neighborhood that houses most of the capital’s barracks, including the CMP headquarters and the Army General Headquarters.

The 11th Anti-Aircraft Artillery Group, established in 1986, is tasked with the defense of the Planalto Palace and is the best-equipped anti-aircraft artillery unit in the Army. It was originally formed as part of the 1st Anti-Aircraft Artillery Brigade under the Southeastern Military Command, but it is currently attached to the CMP for integrated security purposes and receives logistical and administrative support from the 11th Military Region (11.ª RM).

- Planalto Military Command (Comando do Comando Militar do Planalto) in Brasília
  - Planalto Military Command Administrative and Support Base (Base de Administração e Apoio do Comando Militar do Planalto) in Brasília
  - 1st Guard Cavalry Regiment (1º Regimento de Cavalaria de Guardas) in Brasília
  - Presidential Guard Battalion (Batalhão da Guarda Presidencial) in Brasília
  - 1st Information Support Operations Battalion (PSYOPS) (1º Batalhão de Operações de Apoio à Informação) in Goiânia
  - Brasília Military Police Battalion (Batalhão de Polícia do Exército de Brasília) in Brasília
  - 2nd Railroad Battalion (2º Batalhão Ferroviário) in Araguari
  - 7th Military Intelligence Company (7ª Companhia de Inteligência) in Brasília
  - Army Artillery Command (Comando de Artilharia do Exército), in Brasilia
    - Command Battery of Army Artillery Command (Bateria de Comando do Comando de Artilharia do Exército
    - 6th Missile and Rocket Launchers Group (6º Grupo de Mísseis e Foguetes) in Formosa
    - 16th Missile and Rocket Launchers Group (16º Grupo de Mísseis e Foguetes) in Formosa
    - Rocket and Missile Artillery Instruction Center (Centro de Instrução de Artilharia Mísseis e Foguetes) in Brasília
    - Rocket and Missile Logistic Center (Centro de Logística de Mísseis e Foguetes) in Formosa
  - 11th Military Region (11ª Região Militar) in Brasília
    - HQ Company 11th Military Region (Companhia de Comando da 11ª Região Militar) in Brasília
    - 11th Supply Depot (11º Depósito de Suprimento) in Brasília
    - Brasília Military Area Hospital (Hospital Militar de Área de Brasília) in Brasília
    - Military Prefecture of Brasília (Prefeitura Militar de Brasília) in Brasilia
    - 7th Military Service Circumscription (7ª Circunscrição de Serviço Militar) in Brasília
  - 3rd Motorized Infantry Brigade (3ª Brigada de Infantaria Motorizada) in Cristalina
    - HQ Company 3rd Motorized Infantry Brigade (Companhia de Comando da 3ª Brigada de Infantaria Motorizada) in Cristalina
    - 22nd Infantry Battalion (22º Batalhão de Infantaria) in Palmas
    - 36th Motorized Infantry Battalion (36º Batalhão de Infantaria Motorizado) in Uberlândia
    - 41st Motorized Infantry Battalion (41º Batalhão de Infantaria Motorizado) in Jataí
    - 32nd Field Artillery Group (32º Grupo de Artilharia de Campanha) in Brasília
    - 16th Logistics Battalion (16º Batalhão Logístico) in Brasília
    - 3rd Mechanized Cavalry Squadron (3º Esquadrão de Cavalaria Mecanizado) in Brasília
    - 23rd Combat Engineer Company (23ª Companhia de Engenharia de Combate) in Ipameri
    - 6th Signals Company (6ª Companhia de Comunicações) in Cristalina
    - 23rd Military Police Platoon (23º Pelotão de Polícia do Exército) in Cristalina
  - Special Operations Command (Comando de Operações Especiais) in Goiânia
    - Special Operations Command Administrative Base (Base de Administração do Comando de Operações Especiais) in Goiânia
    - 1st Special Forces Battalion (1º Batalhão de Forcas Especiais) in Goiânia
    - 1st Commando Actions Battalion (1º Batalhão de Ações de Comandos) in Goiânia
    - NBC Defence Company (Companhia de Defesa Química, Biológica e Nuclear) in Goiânia
    - 6th Military Police Platoon (6º Pelotão de Polícia do Exército) in Goiânia
    - Special Operations Instruction Center (Centro de Instrução de Operações Especiais) in Niterói
    - Special Operations Support Battalion (Batalhão de Apoio às Operações Especiais) in Goiânia
- Vincula
