= Independence Dragoons =

1st Guards Cavalry Regiment
- 1.º Regimento de Cavalaria de Guardas
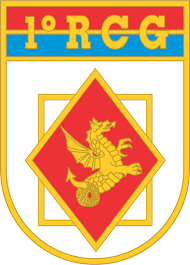
- Coat of arms
- Founded: 13 May 1808 (217 years, 6 months) (in current form) 31 January 1765 (260 years, 10 months) (as the Light Cavalry Squadron of the Guard of the Viceroy)
- Country: Brazil
- Branch: Brazilian Army
- Type: Cavalry
- Part of: Planalto Military Command
- Garrison/HQ: Brasília, Brazil
- Nickname: Independence Dragoons
- Website: www.1rcg.eb.mil.br

Commanders
- Current commander: Lt Col Eduardo Schlup
- Notable commanders: Amaury Kruel

The Independence Dragoons, officially the 1st Guards Cavalry Regiment (Portuguese: 1.º Regimento de Cavalaria de Guardas; 1º RCG), is a unit of the Brazilian Army whose main mission is to garrison the facilities of the Presidency of the Brazil.

== History ==
=== Precursors ===
The current 1st Regiment of Cavalry Guards originates from the Light Cavalry Squadron of the Guard of the Most Illustrious and Excellent Viceroy of the State, created in Rio de Janeiro by royal decree of King Joseph I of Portugal on 13 January 1765. The unit was organized following the model of the dragoon squadrons from Rio Grande do Sul, and it included officers from those units.

The Viceroy's Guard Squadron was reorganized by the then prince regent John of Braganza on 13 May 1808—when the Portuguese Court relocated to Brazil, fleeing the Napoleonic invasion of Portugal—as the 1st Cavalry Regiment of the Army.

With the independence of Brazil, proclaimed on 7 September 1822 by prince Pedro of Braganza, and the establishment of the Brazilian Empire (1822–1889), the unit became the Imperial Honor Guard (1822–1831). It was officially created on 1 December 1822, nearly three months after Brazil's independence. The regiment was described by the Brazilian Army as an "elite cavalry unit directly attached to the Emperor, enjoying several special privileges, such as rendering military honors exclusively to the Emperor and the imperial family".

=== Revival of the historical tradition ===
In 1911, then congressman and historian Gustavo Barroso initiated efforts to exalt Brazil’s military traditions. After analyzing the chronology of the 1st Guards Cavalry Regiment (1st RCG), he presented a bill to the Chamber of Deputies in 1917, requesting permission to revive the regiment’s traditions.

The Brazilian Senate gave final approval to the bill in 1927, and that same year, the regiment once again donned the historical uniform of the Imperial Honor Guard during the September 7th Independence Day parade.

The 1st RCG took part in key moments of Brazilian history, including the Independence of Brazil, the Cisplatine War, and the Proclamation of the Republic. The origin of the regiment’s historic motto stems from marshal Deodoro da Fonseca's request for a horse during the Proclamation of the Republic. On that occasion, ensign Eduardo José Barbosa handed him bay horse No. 6, upon which the marshal declared the end of the Brazilian Empire. Since then, by tradition, the commander of the 1st RCG rides a bay horse, specifically identified as No. 6.

== Gallery ==
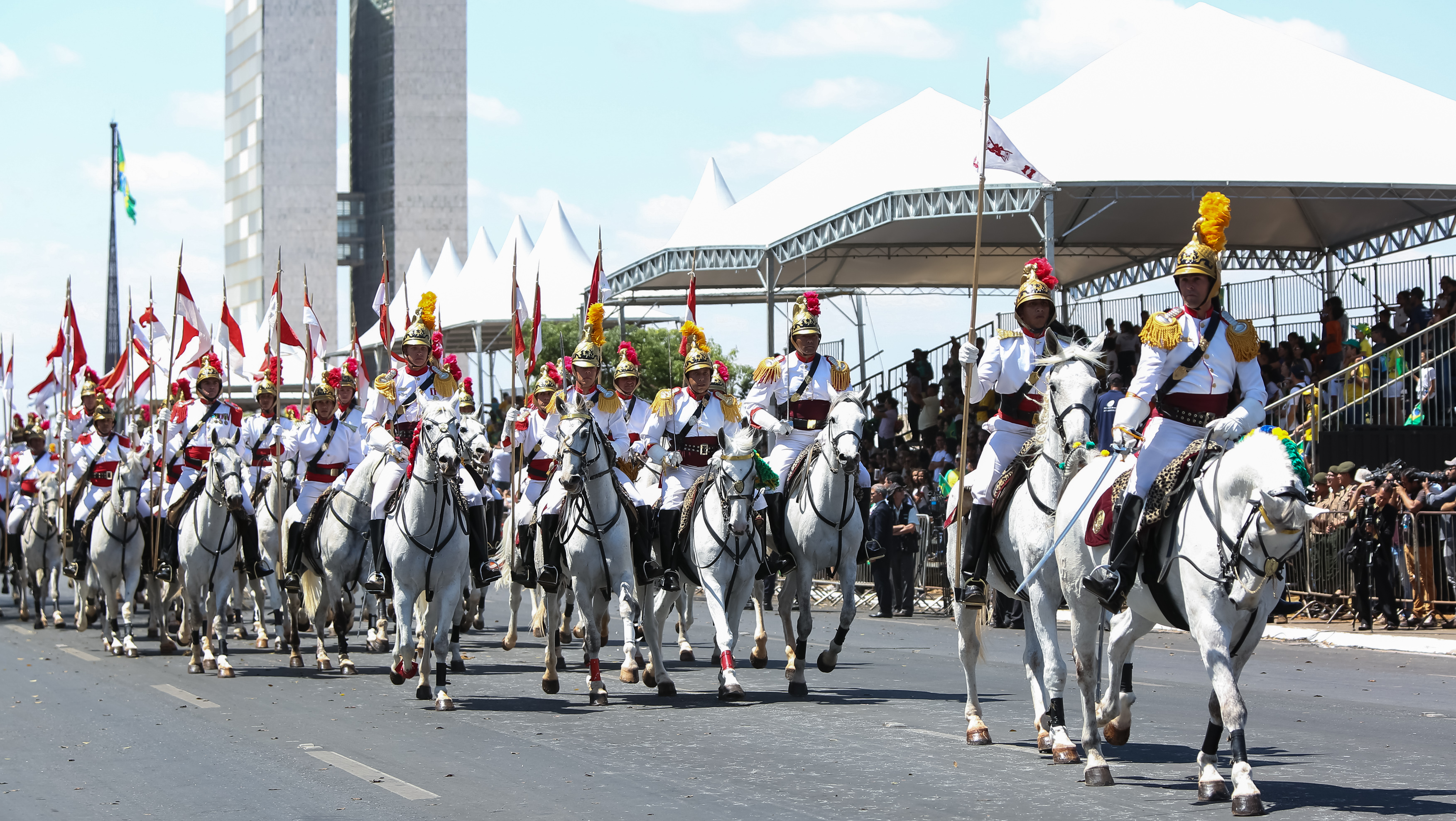

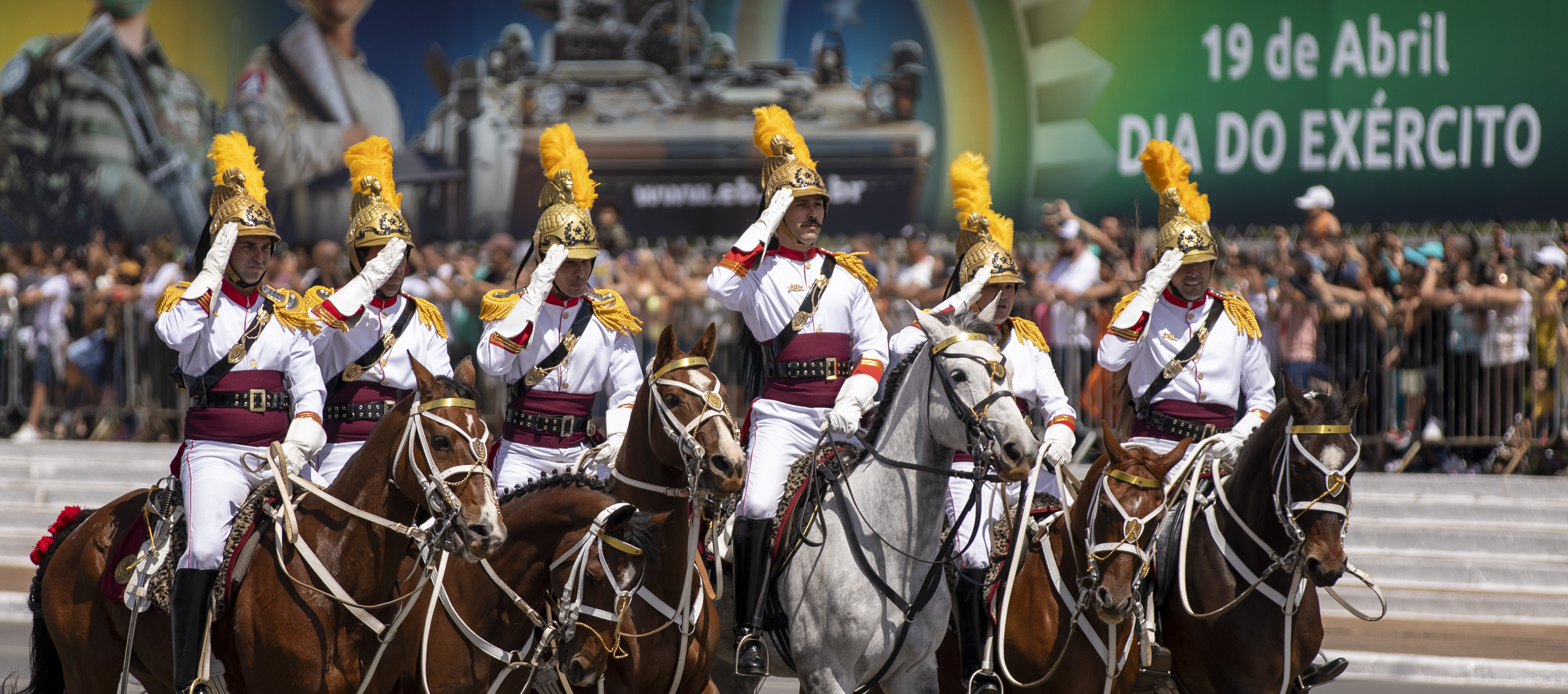

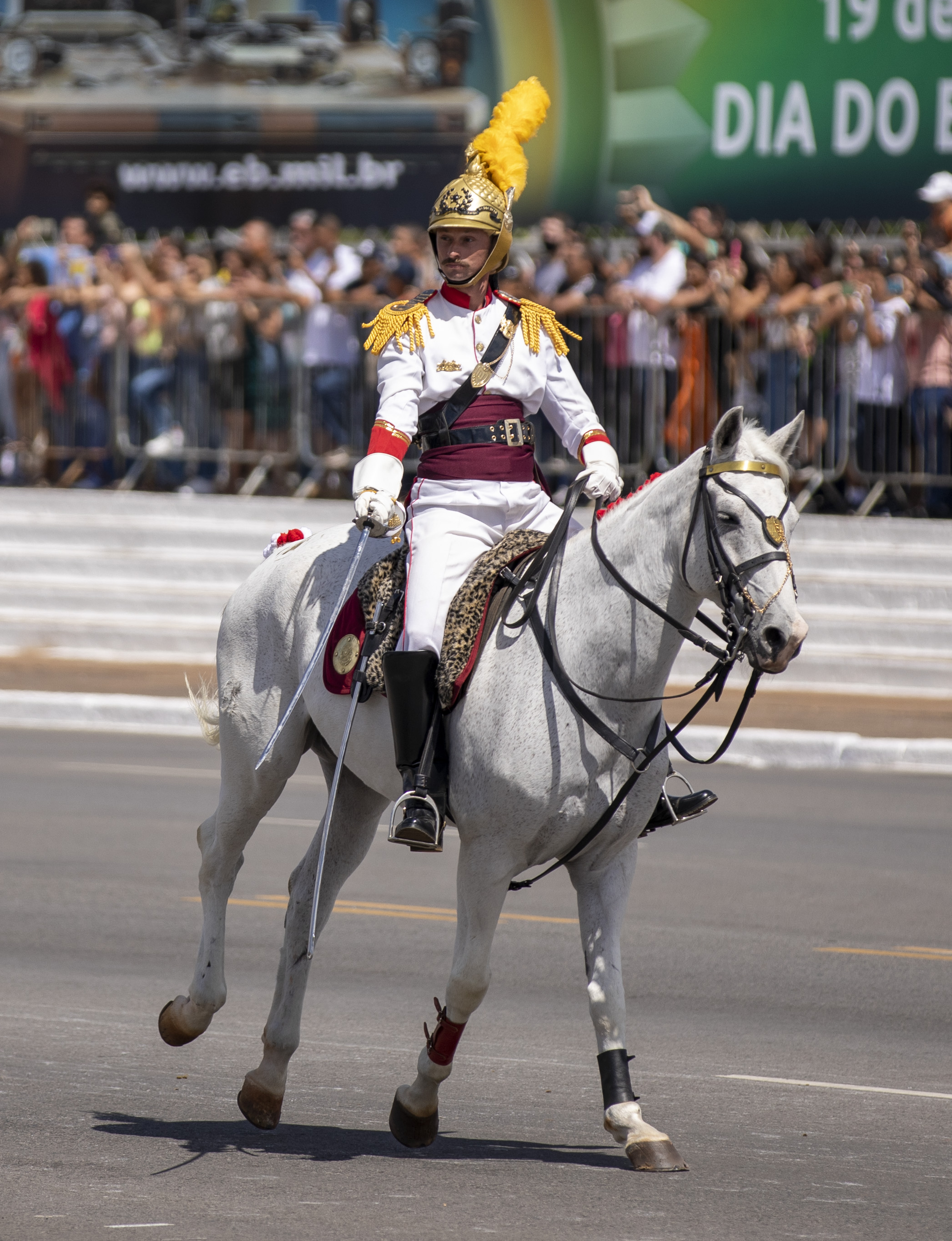

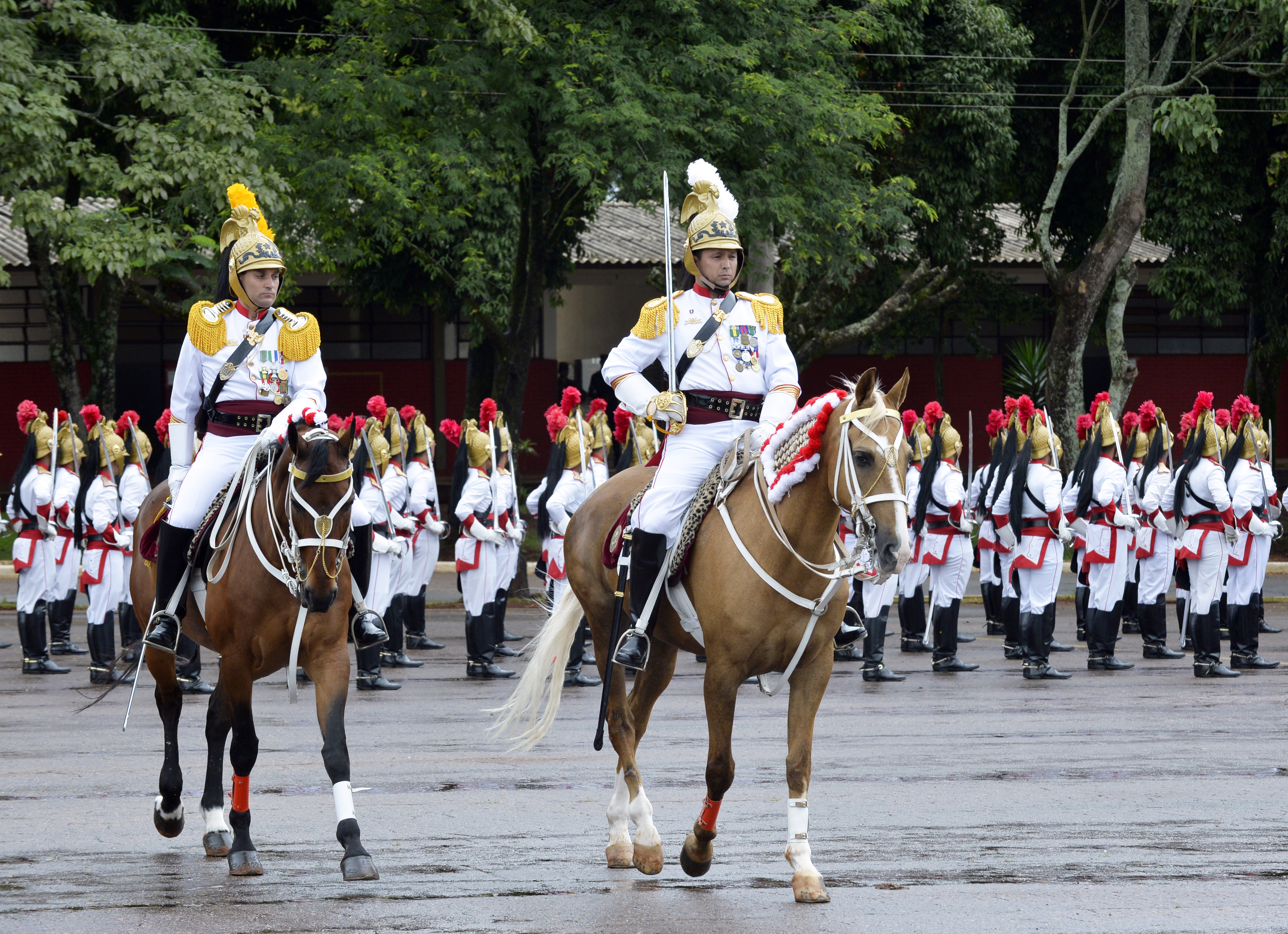

== See also ==
- Brazilian cavalry
