= Premiership of Mariano Rajoy =

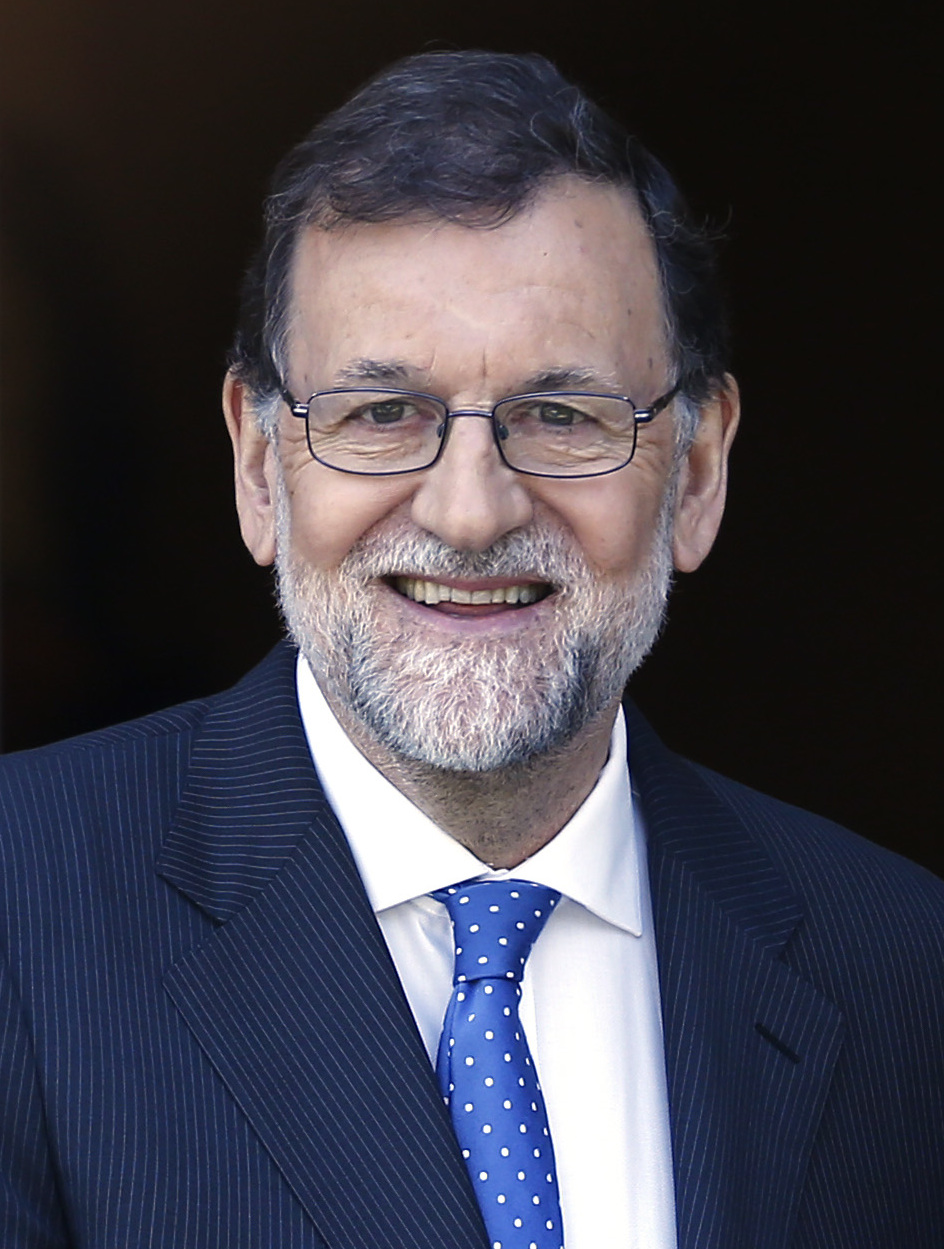
- Rajoy in 2018
- Premiership of Mariano Rajoy; 21 December 2011 – 1 June 2018
- Prime Minister: Mariano Rajoy
- Cabinet: Rajoy I Rajoy II
- Party: PP
- Election: 2011; 2016
- Appointed by: Juan Carlos I Felipe VI
- Seat: Palace of Moncloa
- Coat of arms of Spain

The premiership of Mariano Rajoy over Spain spanned from 2011 to 2018.

== First term (2011–2015) ==
Mariano Rajoy became Prime Minister of Spain on 20 December 2011, after his People's Party's (PP) landslide victory in the 2011 general election. The PP's overall majority of 186 seats gave Rajoy a free hand to handle the country's political and economic situation for the next four years, attaining a parliamentary stability that his predecessor, José Luis Rodríguez Zapatero, had not enjoyed. However, Rajoy's use of decree-laws and the blocking of opposition bill amendments and parliamentary committees would earn him strong criticism from both the media and opposition parties throughout the Legislature, because of the perceived undue use his party made of such an absolute majority.

In contrast, the previous ruling Spanish Socialist Workers' Party (PSOE) had suffered from the worsening economic situation, having its worst electoral performance since 1977 and being ousted from power amidst a climate of high unpopularity. Then-Prime Minister José Luis Rodríguez Zapatero had decided to stand down as PM candidate in early 2011, and as party leader once the quadrennial party conference—due for March 2012—was held. Alfredo Pérez Rubalcaba, PSOE candidate for the 2011 election and former Deputy Prime Minister, was elected as the new party's Secretary General in a tight fight against former Defence Minister Carme Chacón.

=== Economic situation ===
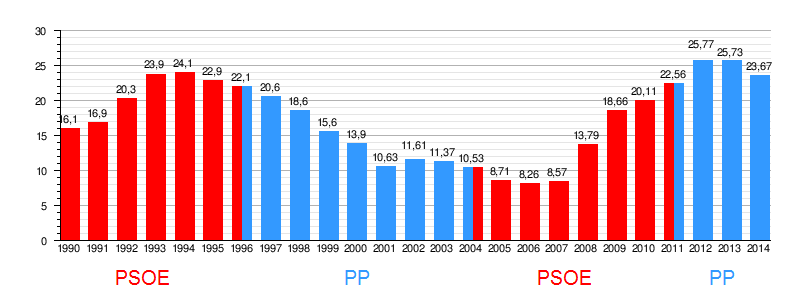
Unemployment in Spain under the different governments.

After taking office, Rajoy's government popularity in opinion polls began to erode after its U-turn on economic policy, which included the breaching of many election pledges. After it had promised to lower taxes during the election campaign of 2011, Rajoy's government announced a first austerity package ten days into office—including new tax rises and a spending cut worth €9 billion—as a result of a larger-than-expected public deficit of 8% (instead of the projected 6%). This was followed by a harsh labour reform, criticised as paving the way to cheapen dismissals and which was met with widespread protests and two general strikes in March and November 2012, and an austere state budget for 2012. The crash of Bankia, one of the largest banks of Spain, in May 2012 resulted in a dramatic rise of the Spanish risk premium, and in June the country's banking system needed a bailout. It was later revealed that Bankia, then directed by Rodrigo Rato, former PP politician, had falsified its accounts between 2011 and 2012 in order to create a false illusion that it was creditworthy. A major spending cut of €65 billion followed in July 2012, including a VAT rise from 18% to 21% which the PP itself had opposed during its time in opposition, after the previous Socialist government had already raised the VAT to 18%.

At this time, incumbent Finance Minister Cristóbal Montoro came under public scrutiny after being accused of telling other opposition MPs, back in 2010, to "let Spain fall, we will get it up", in reference to a PP political opportunist attempt at forcing the fall of Zapatero's cabinet in order to have an early election, which the PP would have presumably won. Montoro later recognized this fact, but justified himself in that he "was working in an alternative. If Zapatero had shortened the legislature, he would have saved much suffering to all Spaniards".

New spending cuts and legal reforms followed throughout 2012 and 2013, including cuts in budget credit lines for the health care and education systems, the implementation of a pharmaceutical copayment, a reform of the pension system which stopped guaranteeing the increase of pensioners' purchasing power accordingly to the consumer price index, the suppression of the bonus for public employees, or the withdrawal of public subsidies to the dependent people care system. Other measures, such as a fiscal amnesty in 2012 allowing tax evaders to regularize their situation by paying a 10% tax—later reduced to 3%—and no criminal penalty, had been previously rejected by the PP during its time in opposition. Additionally, public funding to rescue the Spanish banking system from bankruptcy amounted to €61 billion by late 2013, despite Rajoy having stated during the 2011 campaign that he "would never give public money to help banks". Most of these measures were not included in the PP 2011 election manifesto and, inversely, many of the pledges included within were not fulfilled. Rajoy argued that "reality" prevented him from fulfilling his programme, and that he had been forced to adapt to the new economic situation he found upon his accession to government.

The impact of the government's economic reforms on the Spanish economy was mixed. Unemployment, which peaked in Q1 2013 at 6,202,700 and an unprecedented unemployment rate of 27.16%, had decreased to 2011 levels by late 2015, with 4,850,800 unemployed and 21.18%. This fall was largely attributed by critics and economists to a decrease in the labour force—resulting from many Spaniards emigrating in search of job in other countries—and an increase in temporary contracts, with newly created employments being dubbed as precarious. The risk premium decreased from a record 638 basis points in July 2012 to 113 in October 2015, but it was widely considered that it had largely come as a result from the European Central Bank actions under Mario Draghi of reducing interest rates, which had also benefitted other countries. Public deficit was reduced from 10.3% in 2012 to 5.8% in 2014, while public debt peaked at 98.0% of the GDP in mid-2015 from 69.2% in 2011.

=== Domestic affairs ===
In the domestic field, the 2011–2015 period was dominated by a perceived regression in social and political rights. Spending cuts on the health care and education systems had fueled an increase in inequality among those without enough financial resources to afford those services. Justice Minister Alberto Ruiz-Gallardón's authorization of the enforcement and increase of court fees, requiring the payment of between €50 and €750 to appeal to the courts, was dubbed as violating the rights of effective judicial protection and free legal assistance. The controversial fees would later be removed in early 2015. Education Minister José Ignacio Wert's new Education Law (LOMCE), allegedly introduced to address the extremely high-school dropout rates, received heavy criticism from the Basque and Catalonia regional governments, which dubbed it as a re-centralization attempt, as well as from social sectors which considered that it prompted segregation in primary schools. Another bill, the Citizen Security Law proposed by Interior Minister Jorge Fernández Díaz, also dubbed the "gag law" by critics, was met with a global outcry because of it being seen as a cracking down on Spaniards' rights of freedom of assembly and expression. This bill laid out strict guidelines on demonstrations, perceived to limit street protests, and set up steep fines to offenders.

In September 2013, Minister Ruiz-Gallardón announced that the government was studying a reform of the 2010 abortion law approved by the previous Socialist government, which allowed free abortion up to 14 weeks, and up to 22 weeks in cases of foetal deformities. The bill, in the draft law published in December 2013, allowed abortion only in cases of rape and when there was a serious (but undefined) health risk to the mother. Public outrage was felt from most opposition parties, as well as from many feminist organizations, with the bill being criticised as 'too restrictive' and 'a return to the past'. As the bill received widespread criticism both from within and outside the PP itself, its final approval date was postponed several times. In September 2014, PM Mariano Rajoy announced that his government was scrapping the reform and would instead opt for minor changes to the current abortion law, mainly the requirement for 16 and 17-year-old women to obtain parental consent to have an abortion, and suggesting the 'lack of consensus' as the main reason behind the decision to scrap the bill. This resulted in Alberto Ruíz-Gallardón announcing his resignation from his ministerial position and from politics the same day, "feeling unable to fulfill the assignment he was tasked", and amid voices pointing to him having been discredited by his own party.

In August and September 2014, two Spanish priests infected with the Ebola virus disease during the virus epidemic in West Africa were medically evacuated to Spain. Both patients died as a result of the disease, but a failure in infection control during the treatment of the second priest led to the infection of one of the nurses who had treated him; the case being confirmed on 6 October 2014. Health Minister Ana Mato came under heavy criticism under allegations that security protocols had not been effectively enforced and because of an alleged confusing and disorganized management of the situation. Five days after the nurse's Ebola case was confirmed, PM Mariano Rajoy handed the crisis' management to Deputy PM Soraya Sáenz de Santamaría, in a move seen as critical of Mato's handling of the situation. Ana Mato would resign later in November 2014 as consequence of her involvement in the Gürtel affair.

=== Corruption scandals ===
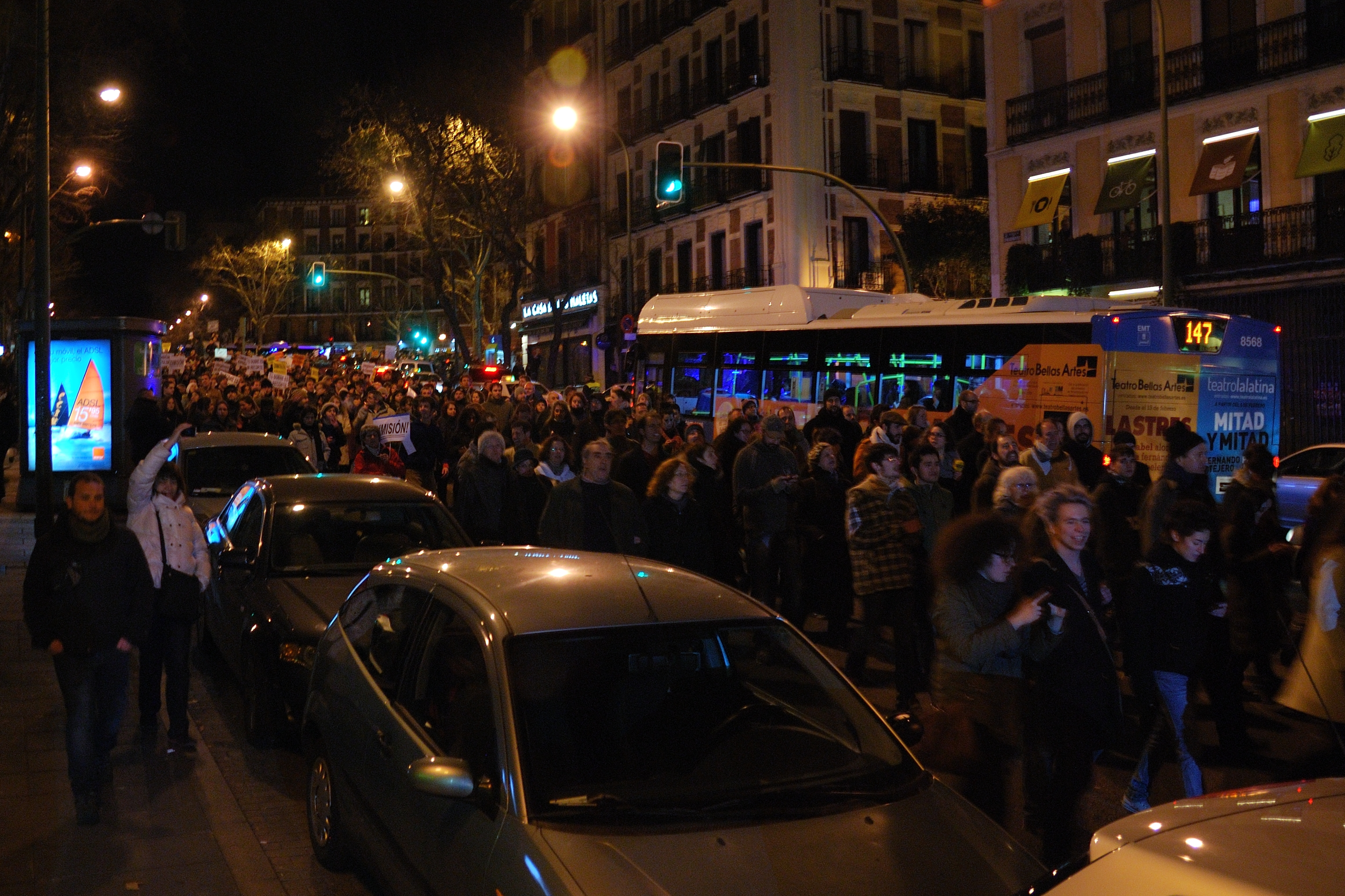
Protesters gather outside the PP HQs in Madrid after the eruption of the Bárcenas affair.

The political landscape of Spain was shaken in early 2013 by the Bárcenas affair. On 18 January 2013, Spanish daily El Mundo revealed that former PP treasurer Luis Bárcenas had, up until 2009, used a slush fund to pay out monthly amounts, ranging from €5,000 to €15,000, to leading members of the party. On 31 January 2013, Spanish daily El País published what became known as the "Bárcenas' Papers", facsimile excerpts from handwritten ledgers in Bárcenas' hand. Among the recipients were incumbent party leader and Prime Minister Mariano Rajoy and Secretary General María Dolores de Cospedal. The PP took the position that these payments were in accordance with law. Further, on 14 July 2013, El Mundo published excerpts from several SMS between Bárcenas and Rajoy from 2011 through 2013 in which Rajoy promised help to Bárcenas and gave him encouragement. The most recent of these messages was in March 2013, when the Bárcenas affair had already broke out. Under pressure from international media and opposition parties threatening him with a motion of censure, Rajoy spoke out to Congress in an extraordinary plenary session on 1 August. Rajoy denied any criminal responsibility, which he attributed solely to Bárcenas, but recognized "errors" and "having trusted the wrong person". This did not prevent the opposition bloc from demanding Rajoy's resignation, but with the PP commanding an absolute majority in parliament and with no judicial proof on Rajoy's direct involvement in the scandal, chances for a successful motion were slim.

At the same time, a corruption scandal affecting Duke of Palma Iñaki Urdangarín, the Nóos affair, resulted in the charging in April 2013 of his spouse Cristina de Borbón, Infanta of Spain and daughter of King Juan Carlos I, for tax fraud and money laundering. She was summoned to court in February 2014, and in November 2014, the High Court of Palma de Mallorca upheld charges against her, paving the way for her to face trial, though only on tax fraud charges. In June 2015, King Felipe VI officially deprived his sister of her dukedom, privately announcing his intention beforehand. These corruption allegations severely eroded the Spanish Royal Family's popularity within Spain; according to an opinion poll by the CIS, between 1995 and 2013 the Spanish monarchy's approval rating had dropped from 7.5 to 3.68 on a scale of 10 amongst Spaniards.

In late 2014, the sudden emergence of several episodes of corruption that had taken place over the course of the past years and decades was compared to the Italian Tangentopoli episode in the 1990s. As a result, this episode has been dubbed by some media as 'the Spanish Tangentopoli' or 'Black October'.

- Starting in July 2014, former Catalonia President Jordi Pujol had come under investigation after he acknowledged possessing a large, undeclared, familiar fortune, with several of his sons being already under investigation on alleged tax offense charges. By October 2014, most of his family had already come under investigation under alleged money laundering, fraud, public contract kickbacks and other tax offenses.
- In early October a massive expenses scandal was uncovered involving former Caja Madrid senior executives and advisers. At least 86 bankers, politicians, officers and trade union leaders were accused of using undeclared "black" credit cards between 2003 and 2012, spending over €15 million in private expenditures. Involved was former Caja Madrid chairman between 1996 and 2009, Miguel Blesa, but also notable members from the PP, PSOE and IU parties, such as former Deputy PM, IMF Managing Director and Caja Madrid/Bankia chairman Rodrigo Rato, as well as members from Spain's main trade unions UGT and CCOO.
- In late October, judge Pablo Ruz charged former PP Secretary General and several-times Minister during José María Aznar's tenure, Ángel Acebes, with a possible misappropriation of public funds as a result of the Barcenas affair. A few days later, Ruz' inquiry on a Treasury investigation unveiled that the People's Party could have spent as much as €1.7 million of undeclared money on works of its national headquarters in Madrid between 2006 and 2008. On 27 October, a large anti-corruption operation, Operation Punica, resulted in 51 people arrested because of their involvement in a major scandal of public work contract kickbacks, amounting at least €250 million. Among those arrested were notable municipal and regional figures from both PSOE and PP, as well as a large number of politicians, councilors, officials and businessmen in the Madrid community, Murcia, Castile and León and Valencia.

On 26 November, judge Ruz summoned Health Minister Ana Mato to court after concluding she could have benefited from several corruption crimes allegedly committed by her former husband Jesús Sepúlveda, charged in the Gürtel affair. As a result, Ana Mato resigned from her office that same day, defending that she had not been charged with any penal crime, but declaring that she did not want to bring further harm to her party. A Congress plenary in which Rajoy was to announce legal reforms against corruption had been scheduled for 27 November several weeks previously; the media concluded that Rajoy had forced Mato's resignation in order to prevent a complicated political situation on that day.

=== Catalan independence movement ===
On 9 November, one month before the election, the Parliament of Catalonia passed an official declaration that launched the "initiation of the process of independence of Catalonia" in a 72–63 vote with no abstentions. Two days later, Prime Minister Mariano Rajoy threatened to suspend the political powers of 21 key political figures in the Catalonian independence movement if they moved forward regarding the provisions of the declaration.

=== Social discontent ===
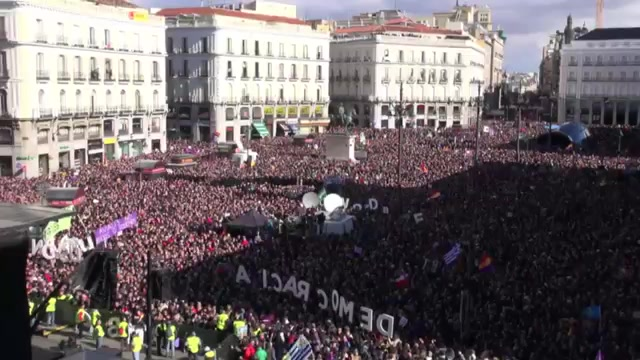
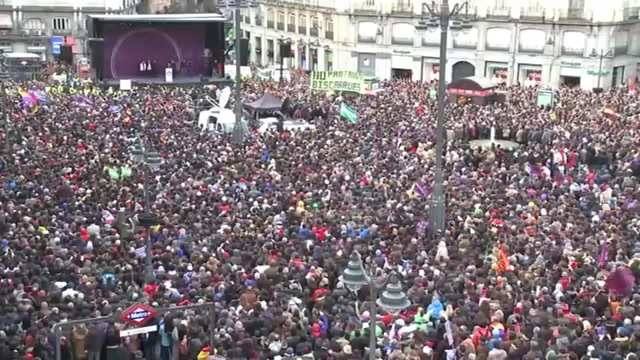
In preparation for the elections that were to be held throughout the year, newly founded Podemos staged a massive rally in Puerta del Sol, Madrid, on 31 January 2015, dubbed as "The March of Change" (La Marcha del Cambio).

The Spanish anti-austerity movement, also known as the 15-M Movement or Indignants Movement, born on the eve of the 2011 municipal and regional elections, had resulted in an increase of street protests and demonstrations calling for a more democratic governmental system, a halt to spending cuts and tax increases and an overall rejection of Spain's two-party system formed by the People's Party (PP) and the Spanish Socialist Workers' Party (PSOE). After the PP's arrival to government and its subsequent breach of electoral promises as well as the emergence of corruption cases, protests intensified. Social mobilization channeled through various protest actions, such as Surround the Congress ("Rodea el Congreso"), the so-called Citizen Tides ("Mareas Ciudadanas") or the Marches for Dignity ("Marchas de la Dignidad").

Despite the PP's enormous loss of support, the main opposition party, the PSOE, remained unable to channel this social discontent and to regain lost support, with pundits hypothesizing that the memory of Zapatero's last government and its economic management remained fresh in voters' minds. A series of negative regional election results throughout 2012, coupled with an internal crisis in 2013 and the threat of rupture from the party's Catalonia partner, the PSC, further weakened the PSOE, with Alfredo Pérez Rubalcaba's leadership being put in question as his popularity ratings plummeted. The crisis was temporarily settled after the party's Political Conference in November 2013, with the question on the party's leadership being initially postponed for late 2014.

All of this culminated in the 2014 European Parliament election. Claims from the ruling PP government that economic recovery was already underway did not prevent a major collapse in support for both main parties, together falling below 50% of the votes for the first time ever. This came coupled with the confirmation of a large rise in support for minor national parties that polls had partly predicted, but also a surprisingly strong performance for the new Podemos party, which from that moment, together with Citizens (C's), began to attract the support of those disaffected with both PP and PSOE, according to opinion polls. PSOE leader Alfredo Pérez Rubalcaba resigned the day after the European election. A PSOE extraordinary conference was held, resulting in Pedro Sánchez being elected as new party leader. The election was also said to have hastened the abdication of the 39 year-reigning King Juan Carlos I, already weakened from a deteriorating health and a diminishing popularity as a result of several scandals, in favor of his son Felipe in June 2014.

== Second term (2016–2018) ==
=== Vote of no confidence ===
On 1 June 2018, Rajoy lost a vote of confidence in the Spanish Parliament, with the votes being 180–169.

== See also ==
- Premiership of Pedro Sánchez
