= Duchess of Palma de Mallorca =

Title in Spanish peerage

Dukedom of Palma de Mallorca
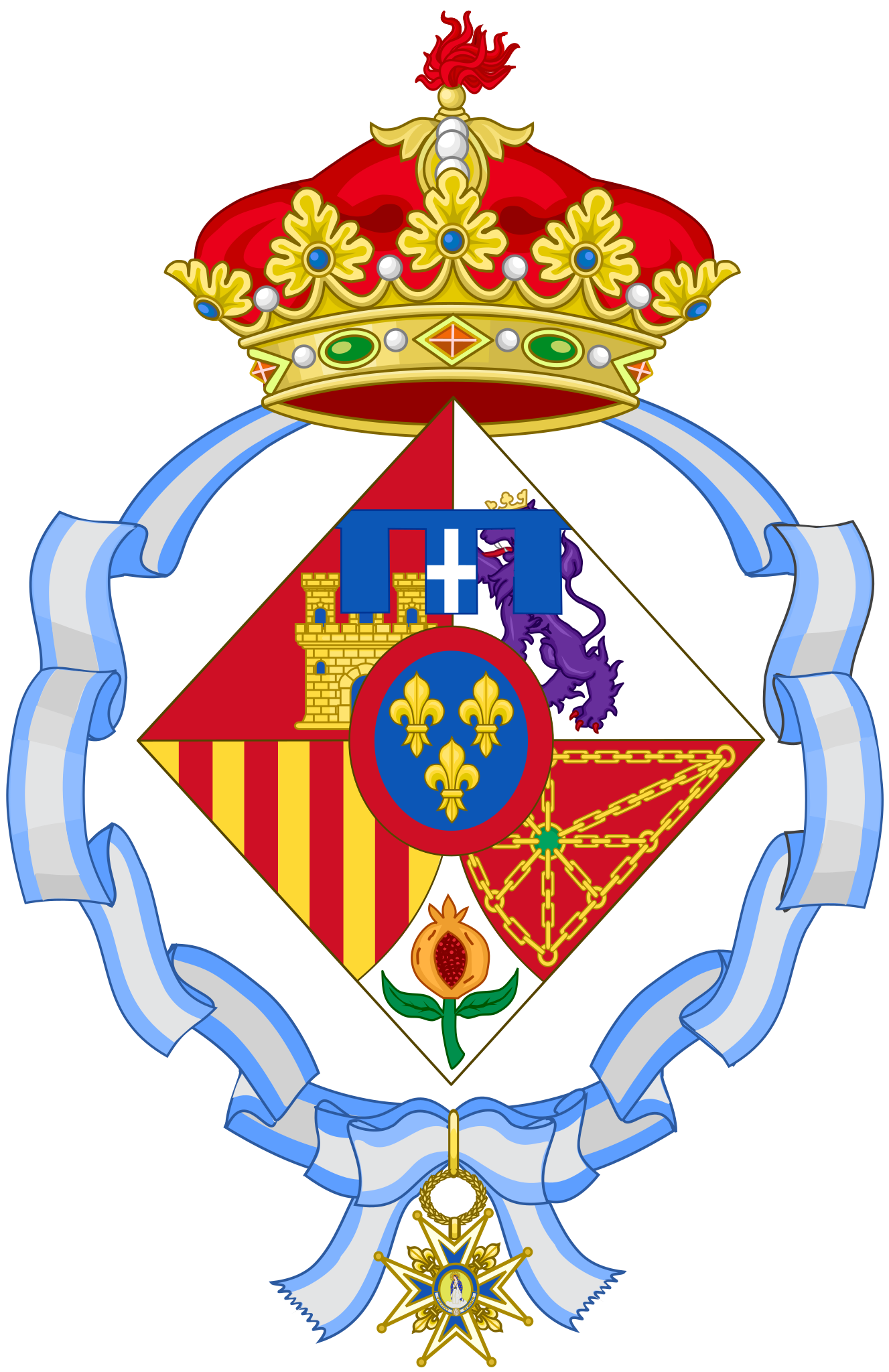
- Arms of the Infanta Cristina, Duchess of Palma de Mallorca
- Creation date: 26 September 1997
- Creation: First
- Created by: Juan Carlos I
- Peerage: Peerage of Spain
- First holder: Infanta Cristina
- Last holder: Infanta Cristina
- Heir apparent: Reverted to the Crown.
- Status: Extinct
- Extinction date: 11 June 2015

Duchess of Palma de Mallorca was a substantive title in the Peerage of Spain. The title takes its name from the city of Palma de Mallorca, in the Balearic Islands.

The royal dukedom was granted on 26 September 1997 by King Juan Carlos I to his younger daughter, Infanta Cristina, on the occasion of her forthcoming marriage to Iñaki Urdangarin.

In April 1998, the City Council of Palma de Mallorca renamed one of its principal streets 'La Rambla' as "La Rambla dels Ducs de Palma de Mallorca" (English: La Rambla of the dukes of Palma de Mallorca). That same year, the Duchess and the Duke were granted the Golden Medal of the Balearic Islands.

In 2013, the City Council renamed the street to its original name and, in 2018, the regional government of the islands revoked the Golden Medal to Urdangarin.

On 11 June 2015, she was stripped of her dukedom by King Felipe VI, her younger brother, due to a corruption inquiry, and the dukedom was merged again in the Spanish Crown.

== Duchess of Palma de Mallorca ==
=== First creation, 1997-2015 ===
Duchess	Portrait	Birth	Marriage(s)	Death
Infanta Cristina; House of Bourbon; 1997–2015	Infanta Cristina	13 June 1965; Our Lady of Loreto Hospital, Madrid, Spain daughter of King Juan Carlos I and Queen Sofia	Iñaki Urdangarin; 4 October 1997 – December 2023 (divorce); 4 children	Living
The title of Duchess of Palma de Mallorca was withdrawn for implication in corruption scandals

== Sources ==
- Real Decreto 1502/1997, de 26 de septiembre, por el que se concede, con carácter vitalicio, la facultad de usar el título de Duquesa de Palma de Mallorca a Su Alteza Real la Infanta Doña Cristina (BOE núm. 232, de 27 de septiembre de 1997). (in Spanish)
- Real Decreto 470/2015, de 11 de junio, por el que se revoca la atribución a Su Alteza Real la Infanta Doña Cristina de la facultad de usar el título de Duquesa de Palma de Mallorca (BOE núm. 140, de 12 de junio de 2015). (in Spanish)
