= Monarchy of Spain =

King of Spain
- Spanish: Rey de España
- Coat of arms of the King of Spain

Incumbent
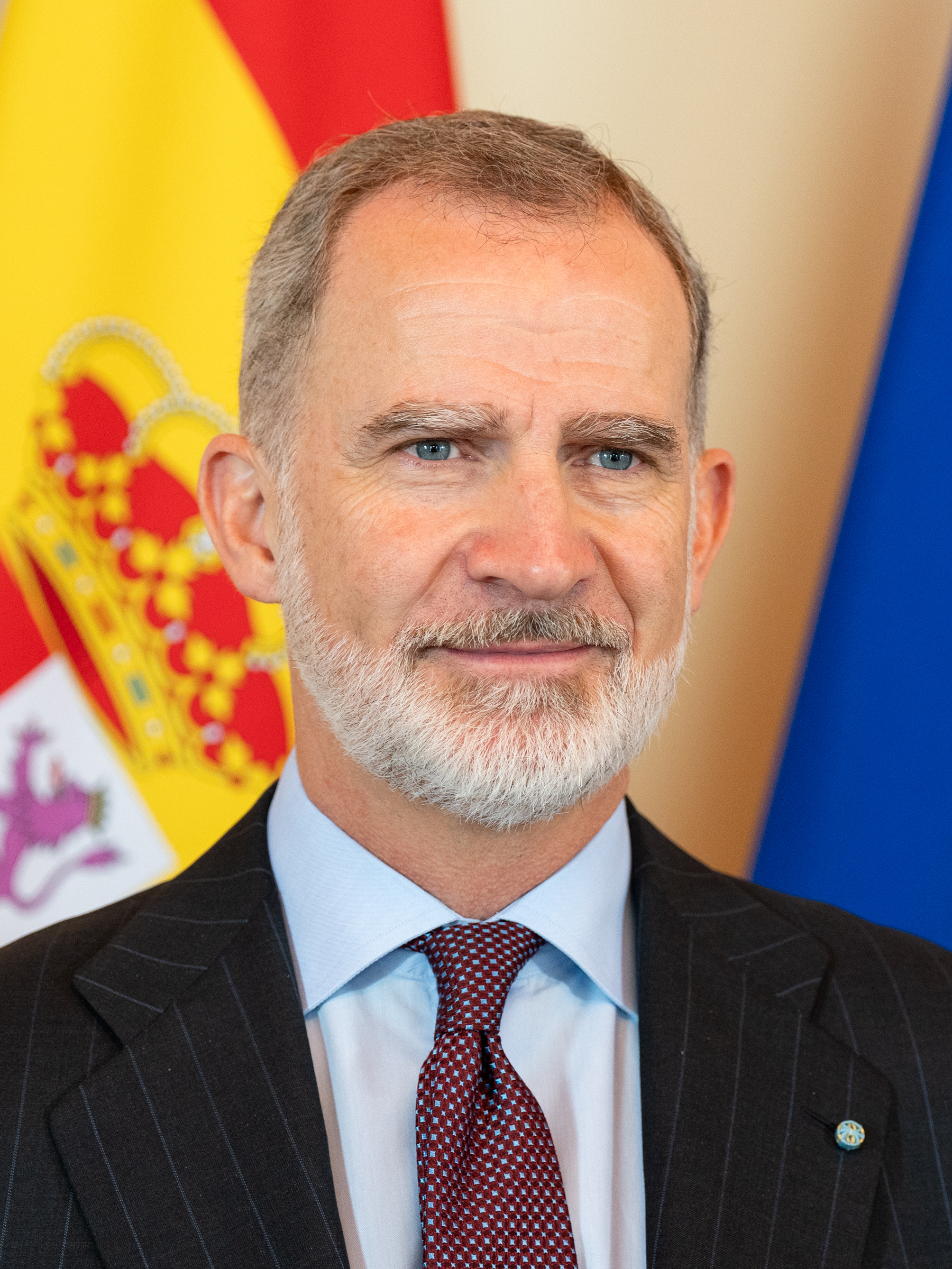
- Felipe VI since 19 June 2014

Details
- Style: His Majesty
- Heir presumptive: Leonor, Princess of Asturias
- First monarch: Isabella I of Castile and Ferdinand II of Aragon (Catholic Monarchs of Spain)
- Residences: Royal Palace of Madrid (official); Palace of Zarzuela (private)
- Website: The Spanish Monarchy

The monarchy of Spain (Spanish: Monarquía Española) is the constitutional form of government of Spain by which a hereditary monarch reigns as the head of state, being the highest office of the country. Since 19 June 2014, the monarch is King Felipe VI, who ascended the throne on the abdication of his father, King Juan Carlos I.

The Spanish monarchy is constitutionally referred to as The Crown (Spanish: La Corona), and it comprises the reigning monarch, the royal family and the institutions whose purpose is to assist them in their public responsibilities, namely, the Royal Household and Patrimonio Nacional.

The Spanish Constitution of 1978 re-established (Note: According to historian Charles Powell, the term reestablished, rather than restored, was a conscious choice to find a middle ground acceptable by monarchists, who viewed the 1975 monarchy as a restoration, and Franconists who took the view that General Franco had essentially established a new monarchy apart from the prior historic office.) a constitutional monarchy as the form of government for Spain after the end of the dictatorship of Francisco Franco and the restoration of democracy in 1977. The 1978 constitution affirmed the role of the King of Spain as the living personification and embodiment of the Spanish nation and a symbol of Spain's enduring unity and permanence and is also invested as the "arbitrator and the moderator" of Spanish institutions. Constitutionally, the sovereign is the head of state and commander-in-chief of the Spanish Armed Forces. The constitution codifies the use of royal styles and titulary, royal prerogatives, hereditary succession to the crown, compensation, and a regency-guardianship contingency in cases of the monarch's minority or incapacitation. According to the Constitution, the monarch is also instrumental in promoting relations with the "nations of its historical community". The monarch serves as honorary chairperson of the Organization of Ibero-American States, representing over 700,000,000 people in twenty-four member nations worldwide.

Historically Iberia was divided into several kingdoms, which gradually became united into Spain under the Habsburg dynasty. Only in the reign of Philip II of Spain from 1556 did "King of Spain" become the usual way to refer to the monarch, in Spain and the rest of Europe.

== History ==
=== The Christian Kingdoms ===
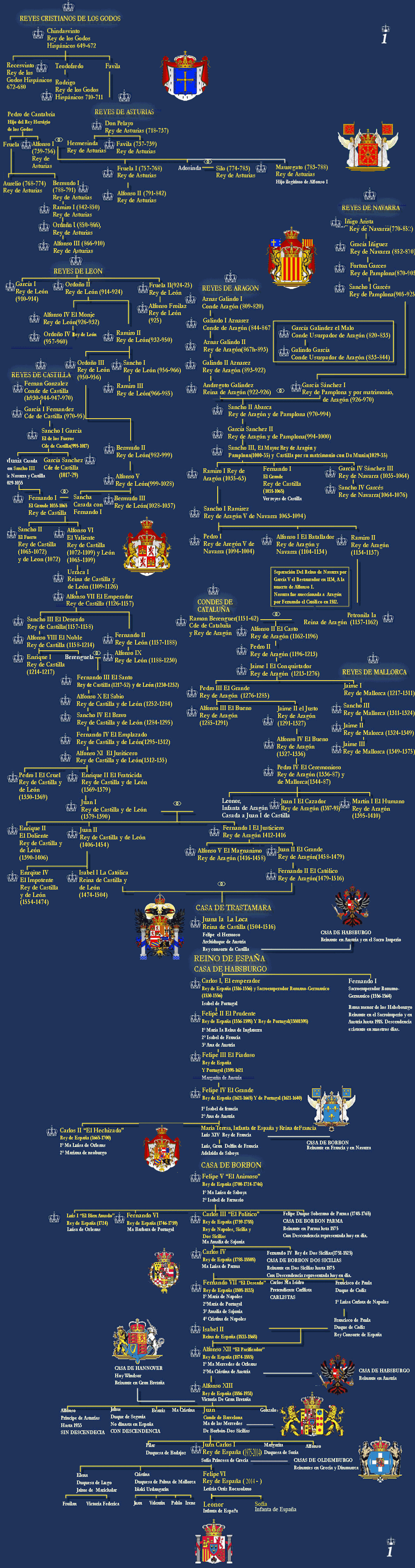
Dynastic line from the first Visigothic kings to Felipe VI

The monarchy in Spain has its roots in the Christian states emerged in Northern Iberia following the Umayyad conquest of Visigothic Hispania in the 8th century: Asturias (later Leon and Castile), Navarre, Aragon and Catalonia, which fought the Reconquista or Reconquest of the Iberian peninsula. These Christian states often proclaimed themselves successor states of the Visigothic Kingdom. The earliest dynasty of the Reconquista was the Astur-Leonese dynasty, the male line of Peter of Cantabria, who was related to Pelagius through the marriage of their children. Although Fernán González achieved an autonomous from León and hereditary state in the 10th century in Castile, the Astur-Leonese dynasty, which persistently claimed to be the successor of the Visigothic kings, reigned for roughly 300 years in Northwest Iberia.

Two of the most influential dynasties were the House of Barcelona, the longest-reigning dynasty, and the House of Jiménez, which put much of Christian Iberia under its leadership in the 11th century and remained in Navarre in the 12th century and early 13th century. From Sancho III of Navarre (r. 1000–1035) until Urraca of León and Castile (r. 1106–1125), members of the Jiménez family claimed the historic Visigothic title Imperator totius Hispaniae or Emperor of All Spain. The Jiménez rulers sought to bring their kingdoms into the European mainstream and often engaged in cross-Pyrenees alliances and marriages, and became patrons to Cluniac Reforms (c. 950–c. 1130). Urraca's son and heir Alfonso Raimúndez, the first king of Castile and León from the House of Burgundy, was the last king to claim the imperial title of Spain, but divided his empire among his sons. In Aragon and Catalonia, the marriage between Petronilla of Aragon and Ramon Berenguer IV of Barcelona (1131–1162) led to the creation of the Crown of Aragon. Similarly, in the 13th century, Ferdinand III of Castile, son of Berengaria I of Castile and Alfonso IX de León, established the Crown of Castile after inheriting the title of king of León.

The Castilian Civil War (1366 to 1369) ended with the death of King Peter (r. 1334–1369) at the hands of his illegitimate half-brother Henry, 1st Count of Trastámara who ruled as Henry II (r. 1369–1379). Henry II became the founder of the House of Trastámara and its first member to rule over a Spanish kingdom, the Crown of Castile. Henry's son, John I of Castile, married Eleanor of Aragon, the last queen of Aragon of the House of Barcelona-Aragón: while their first son, Henry III, inherited the Crown of Castile; their second son, Ferdinand of Trastámara, would become the first of the Trastámaras to rule over the Crown of Aragon after the Compromise of Caspe. King Peter's heiress, his granddaughter Catherine of Lancaster, married Henry III, reuniting both dynasties of the Crown of Castile in the person of their son, King John II.

=== Marital union of the Catholic Monarchs ===
In the 15th century, the marriage between Isabella I of Castile and Ferdinand II of Aragon, both members of the House of Trastámara, known as the Catholic Monarchs, united two important kingdoms of the Iberian Peninsula. Each kingdom retained its basic structure. The last pretender of the crown of the Byzantine Empire, Andreas Palaiologos, who styled himself as "Emperor of Constantinople", bestowed his imperial title to Ferdinand II of Aragon and Isabella I of Castile in his last testament, dated 7 April 1502, although the Spanish monarchs have never used the title. In 1492 the Catholic Monarchs conquered the Kingdom of Granada in southern Spain, the last Muslim territory in the Iberian peninsula. The unification of Spain is marked from this date, though the Spanish kingdoms continued past that date.

The territories of the Spanish Empire overseas were dependencies of the Crown of Castile, and Castile had an outsized influence there. Following the Spanish explorations and settlement in the Caribbean, the Spanish conquest of the Aztec Empire and the Spanish conquest of the Inca Empire, the crown established high courts ("Audiencias") and viceroyalties in important regions (Mexico, 1535; Panama, 1538, which was later replaced by Lima, 1542). The viceroy (vice-king) and the Audiencias were the effective administrators of royal policy.

=== Habsburg Monarchy ===
In 1505, the Spanish monarchy passed to the House of Habsburg in the person of King Charles I (also Holy Roman Emperor as Charles V), son of Queen Joanna and King Philip I of Castile (usually Philip the Handsome in English). With the death of Ferdinand II of Aragon in 1516 the Aragonese lands were added to Charles and Joanna's territories. With his mother and co-monarch Joanna confined in Tordesillas, claimed to be mad, Charles I was the sole ruler, but the legal situation remained slightly ambiguous until her death in 1555 left Charles the undoubted sole monarch, though as Holy Roman Emperor it was not his principal title. Only in the reign of his son Philip II of Spain from 1556 did "King of Spain" become the usual way to refer to the monarch, in Spain and the rest of Europe.

Philip's reign marked the peak of the Spanish Golden Age (1492–1659), a period of great colonial expansion and trade. The Hispanic Crown retained control over and profited from all operations in overseas colonies (by and large royal assets under a monopoly on trade), including slave trade, developed under the purview of the regalía late-medieval system. The death in 1700 of Charles II, last of the Spanish Habsburgs, triggered the War of the Spanish succession.

=== Bourbon Monarchy ===
With the death of the childless Charles II, the succession to the throne was disputed. Charles II had designated his sister Maria Theresa's grandson, Philip of France, Duke of Anjou, as his heir. The possible unification of Spain with France, the two big European powers at the time, sparked the Spanish War of Succession in the 18th century, culminating in the treaties of Utrecht (1713) and Rastatt (1714), which preserved the European balance of power.

Philip V was the first member of the House of Bourbon (Spanish: Borbón) to rule Spain. That dynasty still rules today under Felipe (Philip) VI.

In the mid-eighteenth century, particularly under Charles III of Spain, the Spanish Crown embarked on an ambitious and far-reaching project to implement major reforms in the administration of Spain and the Spanish Empire. These changes, collectively known as the Bourbon Reforms, attempted to rationalize administration and produce more revenue from the overseas empire.

During the Napoleonic Wars, the French Emperor Napoleon Bonaparte forced Ferdinand VII to abdicate in 1808, and the Bourbons became a focus of popular resistance against French rule. However, Ferdinand's rejection of the liberal Spanish Constitution of 1812, as well as his ministerial appointments, particularly the exclusion of liberals, gradually eroded popular support for the Spanish monarchy. With the Pragmatic Sanction of 1830, Ferdinand set aside the Salic law, introduced by Philip V, that prohibited women from becoming sovereigns of Spain. Thereby, as had been customary before the arrival of the Bourbons, Ferdinand VII's eldest daughter Isabella became his heiress presumptive. Opponents of the Pragmatic Sanction argued that it was never officially promulgated, claiming Ferdinand VII's younger brother, Prince Carlos, the rightful heir to the crown according to the Salic Law.

=== First Spanish Republic ===
King Amadeo I abdicated on 10 February 1873, and on 11 February a parliamentary majority made up of radicals, republicans, and democrats proclaimed the First Spanish Republic. Tensions between federal republicans and unitary republicans plagued the republic, which also inherited the ongoing Third Carlist War in Spain and the Ten Years' War in Cuba, to which was added the Cantonal Rebellion of July 1873–January 1874. The January 1874 coup by General Manuel Pavía y Rodríguez de Alburquerque ousted the government, giving way to a military dictatorship under General Francisco Serrano. On 29 December 1874, General Arsenio Martínez Campos proclaimed Alfonso XII king of Spain in Sagunto, bringing an end to the republic.

=== Bourbon Restoration ===
King Alfonso XII taking the throne in December 1874 began the Bourbon Restoration period. After nearly a century of political instability and several civil wars, Spain attempted during the Restoration period to establish a new political system that ensured stability through the practice of turno, an intentional rotation of liberal and conservative parties in leadership, often achieved through electoral fraud. Critics of the turnismo system included republicans, socialists, communists, anarchists, Basque nationalists, and Catalan nationalists, and Carlists. However, the relative stability of the turnismo system resulted in an era of comparative peace within Spain itself, despite great social inequalities in the agricultural areas of Spain and sporadic unrest related to military defeats abroad. Spain's one-sided defeat in the Spanish-American War in 1898, in which the Spanish Navy suffered heavy losses and the Spanish Empire lost control of Cuba, Puerto Rico, the Philippines, and Guam, dealt the country a particularly severe blow, and Spain remained neutral during World War I (1914–1918).

King Alfonso XIII acquiesced in the 1923 military coup d'état of General Miguel Primo de Rivera, which tied the Bourbon monarchy to Primo de Rivera's subsequent dictatorship. The protracted political turmoil in the wake of an economic depression in the aftermath of World War I and Spanish military defeat in the Battle of Annual in Spanish Morocco resulted in Primo de Rivera's resignation in 1930 and the end of his dictatorship. Alfonso XIII abdicated and went into exile in Fascist Italy in 1931.

=== Second Spanish Republic and dictatorship of Francisco Franco ===
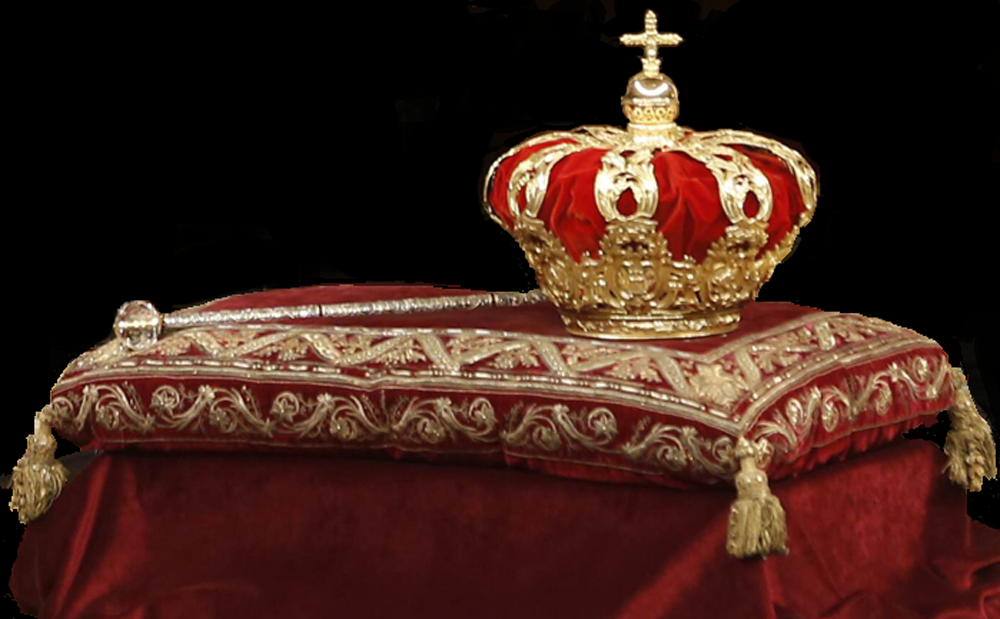
Spanish Royal Crown and Scepter

In 1931 Spanish local elections produced victories (particularly in urban areas) for candidates favoring an end to the monarchy and the establishment of a republic. Faced with unrest in the cities, Alfonso XIII went into exile, but did not abdicate. The ensuing provisional government evolved into the relatively short-lived Second Spanish Republic. The Spanish Civil War began in 1936 and ended on 1 April 1939 with the victory of General Francisco Franco and his coalition of allied organizations commonly referred to as the Nationalists. Fascist Italy and Nazi Germany aided Franco in the Spanish Civil War. The Soviet Union backed the Republican Government as did Mexico under the government of Lázaro Cárdenas.

After sixteen years without monarchy or kingdom, in 1947, Spain was made a kingdom again by General Franco, who claimed to rule as "Head of state of the Kingdom of Spain" through the Law of Succession. However, without a king on the throne, he ruled through a coalition of allied organizations from the Spanish Civil War including, but not limited to, the Falange political party, the supporters of the Bourbon royal family, and the Carlists, until his death in 1975.

=== Re-establishment of the Monarchy ===
Despite Franco's alliance with the Carlists, Franco appointed Juan Carlos de Borbón as his successor, who is credited with presiding over Spain's transition from dictatorship to democracy by fully endorsing political reforms.

Impatient with the pace of democratic reforms, the new king, known for his formidable personality, dismissed Carlos Arias Navarro and appointed the reformer Adolfo Suárez as President of the Government in 1977.

The next year the king signed into law the new liberal democratic Constitution of Spain, which was approved by 88% of voters. Juan Carlos' "quick wit and steady nerve" cut short the attempted military coup in 1981 when the king used a specially designed command communications center in the Zarzuela Palace to denounce the coup and command the military's eleven captains general to stand down.

Following the events of 1981, Juan Carlos led a less eventful life, according to author John Hooper. Juan Carlos did not preside over ceremonies such as the opening of hospitals and bridges as often as monarchs in other nations. Instead, he worked towards establishing reliable political customs when transitioning one government administration to another, emphasizing constitutional law and protocol, and representing the Spanish State domestically and internationally, all the while aiming to maintain a professionally non-partisan yet independent monarchy.

== Crown, constitution, and royal prerogatives ==
The Crown of Spain (la Corona de España), with its roots in the Visigothic kingdom from the 5th century and subsequent successor states, is recognized in Title II The Crown, Articles 56 through 65 of the Spanish Constitution of 1978. Constitutionally the monarch embodies and personifies the "indissoluble" unity and permanence of the Spanish State, and represents the legal personality of the State and by extension fulfills the role of "Father of the Nation". As a unifying figure for the nation, in 2010 King Juan Carlos worked towards "bridging the gap" between Spain's rival polarized political parties to develop a unified strategy in response to the country's on-going late-2000s economic crisis.

According to the Spanish Constitution voted in referendum, the sovereign power emanates from the people, so it is the very same people who give the king the power to reign:

National sovereignty belongs to the Spanish people, from whom all State powers emanate.

— Article 2(2) of the Spanish Constitution of 1978

The monarch "arbitrates and moderates the regular functioning of the institutions" and assumes the highest representation of the Spanish State in international relations. The monarch exercises the functions expressly conferred on him by the constitution and the laws.

The King is Head of State, the symbol of its unity and permanence. He arbitrates and moderates the regular functioning of the institutions, assumes the highest representation of the Spanish State in international relations, especially with the nations of its historical community, and exercises the functions expressly conferred on him by the Constitution and the laws.

— Title II the Crown, Article 56, the Spanish Constitution of 1978 (Note: Spanish: El Rey es el Jefe del Estado, símbolo de su unidad y permanencia, arbitra y modera el funcionamiento regular de las instituciones, asume la más alta representación del Estado español en las relaciones internacionales, especialmente con las naciones de su comunidad histórica, y ejerce las funciones que le atribuyen expresamente la Constitución y las leyes.)

Upon accession to the crown and being proclaimed before the Cortes Generales, the king swears an oath to faithfully carry out his constitutional duties and to abide by the constitution and laws of the state. Additionally, the constitution gives the king the added responsibility to ensure that the constitution is obeyed. Lastly, the king swears to respect the rights of Spanish citizens and of the self-governing communities. The Prince of Asturias, upon reaching the age of majority, in addition to any regent(s) upon assuming the office, swears the same oath as that of the king along with a further oath of loyalty to the monarch.

1. The King, on being proclaimed before the Cortes Generales, will swear to faithfully carry out his duties, to obey the Constitution and the laws and ensure that they are obeyed, and to respect the rights of the citizens and the Self-governing Communities.
2. The Crown Prince, on coming of age, and the Regent or Regents, on assuming office, will swear the same oath as well as that of loyalty to the King.

— Title II The Crown, Article 61, the Spanish Constitution of 1978

The oath reads as follows:

I swear faithfully to discharge my functions, to sustain and see to it that the Constitution and the Laws are sustained, and to respect the rights of the citizens and of the autonomous communities.

— Oath of the king of Spain

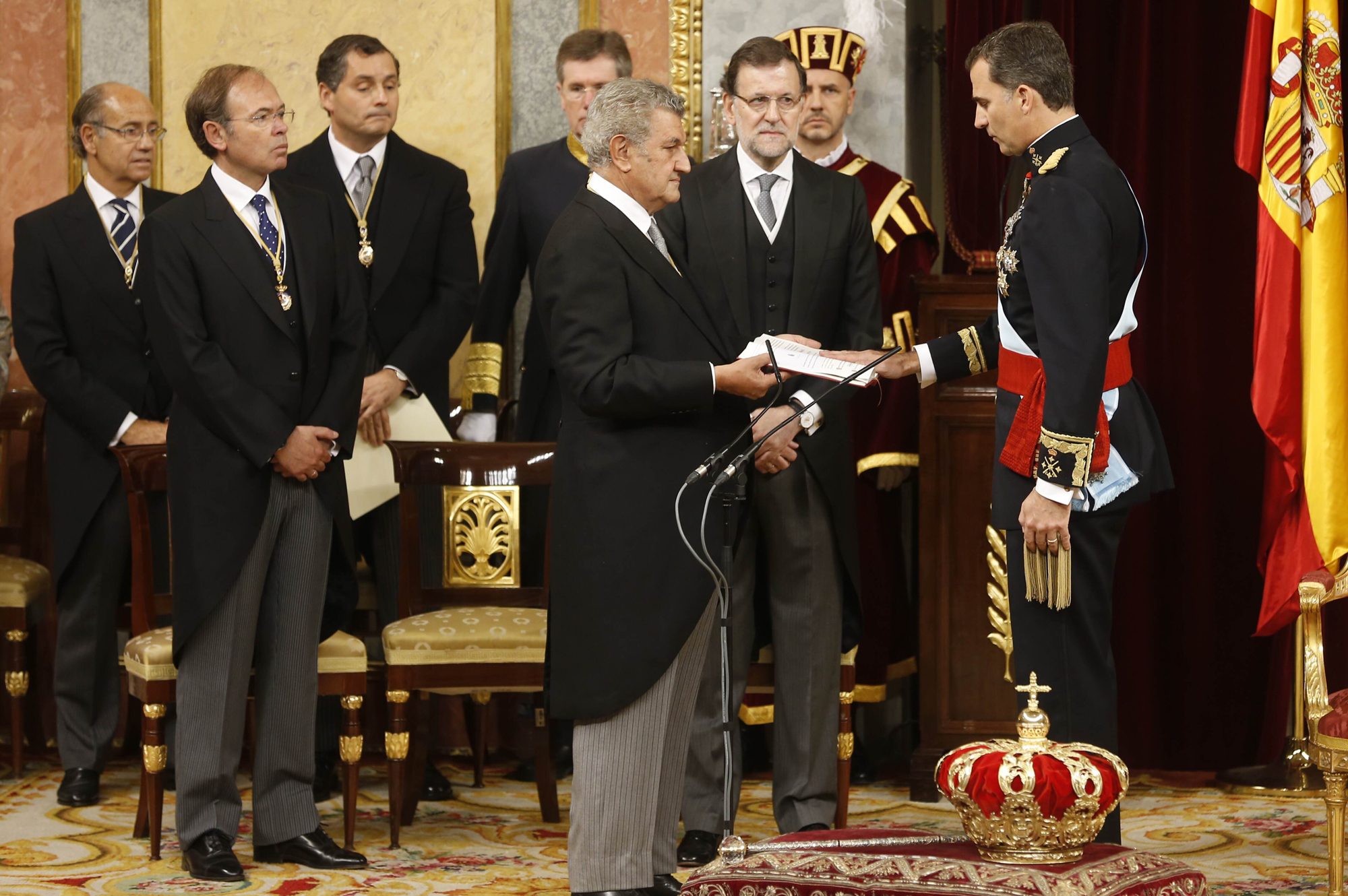
Felipe of Bourbon and Greece takes the oath before the Cortes Generales during the proclamation ceremony at the Palacio de las Cortes, Madrid, 19 June 2014.

The 1978 Constitution, Title II The Crown, Article 62, delineates the powers of the king, while Title IV Government and Administration, Article 99, defines the king's role in the appointment of the prime minister and the formation of the council of ministers/government. Title VI Judicial Power, Article 117, Articles 122 through 124, outlines the king's role in the country's independent judiciary. However, by constitutional convention established by Juan Carlos I, the king exercises his prerogatives having solicited government advice while maintaining a politically non-partisan and independent monarchy. Receiving government advice does not necessarily bind the monarch into executing the advice, except where prescribed by the constitution. His acts shall always be countersigned in the manner established in section 64. Without such countersignature they shall not be valid, except as provided under section 65(2).

It is incumbent upon the King:

1. To sanction and promulgate the laws.
2. To summon and dissolve the Cortes Generales and to call for elections under the terms provided for in the Constitution.
3. To call for a referendum in the cases provided for in the Constitution.
4. To propose a candidate for President of the Government and, as the case may be, appoint him or her or remove him or her from office, as provided in the Constitution.
5. To appoint and dismiss members of the Government on the President of the Government's proposal.
6. To issue the decrees approved in the Council of Ministers, to confer civil and military offices, honours and distinctions in conformity with the law.
7. To be informed of the affairs of State and, for this purpose, to preside over the meetings of the Council of Ministers whenever he sees fit, at the President of the Government's request.
8. To exercise supreme command of the Armed Forces
9. To exercise the right of clemency in accordance with the law, which may not authorize general pardons.
10. To exercise the High Patronage of the Royal Academies.

— Title II The Crown, Article 62, the Spanish Constitution of 1978

=== Styles, titles, and the fount of Honour ===
Royal Standard

The 1978 constitution confirms the title of the monarch is the King of Spain, but that he may also use other titles historically associated with the Crown. (Note: The King of Spain may also use the formal address of His Catholic Majesty, according to Almanach de Gotha page 336 (2000). However, according to Royal Decree published in 1987, the formal addressed used is His Majesty.)

According to Royal Decree 1368/1987, regulating the titles, treatments and honours of the royal family and the regents, the king and his wife, the queen consort, will formally be addressed as "His Majesty and Her Majesty" (Their Majesties, Spanish: Su Majestad, Su represents His or Her) rather than the traditional "Catholic Majesty" (Su Católica Majestad). A prince consort, the husband of a queen regnant, will have the style "His Royal Highness" (Su Alteza Real). The widows and widowers of monarchs are to retain these styles until they remarry. The heir from birth shall hold the title of Prince of Asturias and the other titles historically associated with the heir apparent. These additional titles include Prince of Viana, historically associated with the heir apparent to the Kingdom of Navarre; with the titles Prince of Girona and Duke of Montblanc historically associated with the heir apparent for the Crown of Aragon, among others. Other children of the monarch, and the children of the heir apparent, shall have the title and rank of Infante or Infanta (prince or princess), and styled His or Her Royal Highness (Su Alteza Real). Children of an Infante or Infanta of Spain "shall have the consideration of Spanish Grandees", and the address of "Excellency". The royal decree further limits the ability of any regent to use or create titles during the minority or incapacitation of a monarch. No further constitutional language prescribes titles or forms of address to the fourth generation, or great-grandchildren, of a reigning monarch.

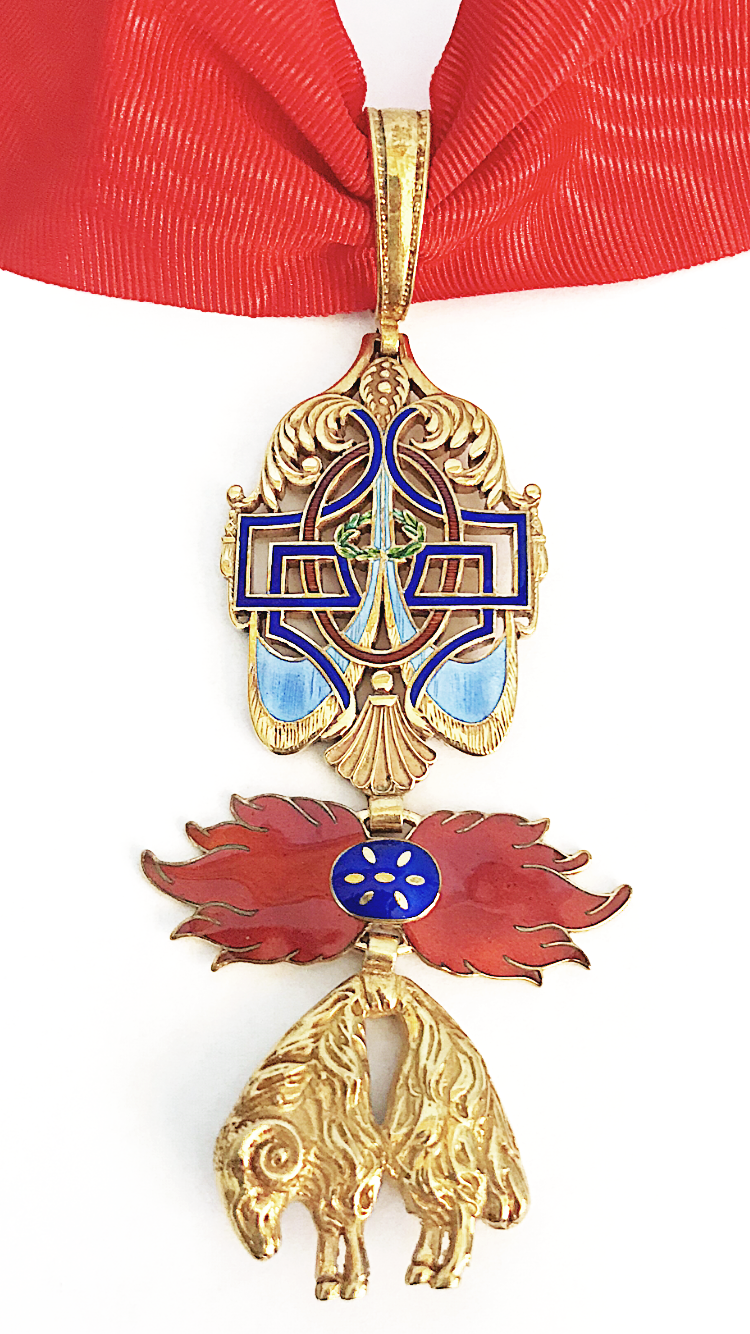
Knight's insignia of the Order of the Golden Fleece

Following his abdication in 2014, Juan Carlos I and his wife Sofía retain courtesy titles of King and Queen of Spain.

The monarch's position as the fount of honour within Spain is codified in Article 62 (f); It is incumbent upon the monarch to "confer civil and military positions and award honors and distinctions in conformity of the law". According to the Spanish Ministry of Justice, nobility and grandee titles are created by the "sovereign grace of the king", and may be passed on to the recipient's heirs, who may not sell the title. Titles may revert to the Crown when their vacancy is observed. Succession of titles may follow one of several courses listed on the Title of Concession when the title is created. As a general rule, most titles are now inherited by absolute Cognatic Primogeniture (as of 2006), in which the first born inherits all titles regardless of gender. However, a title holder may designate his successor, Succession by Assignment, or disperse his titles among his children – with the eldest getting the highest-ranking title, Succession by Distribution.

During his reign between 1975 and 2014, King Juan Carlos awarded peerages to two of his former prime ministers who had retired from active politics: Adolfo Suárez, who was created 1st Duke of Suárez; and Leopoldo Calvo-Sotelo who was created 1st Marquess of la Ría de Ribadeo. All successive politicians remain active within politics.

The king grants not only military and civil orders, but also grants awards of distinction, customarily on the advice of government. The Order of the Golden Fleece, one of the oldest surviving orders of chivalry, is the highest honor the king of Spain can bestow. The second in order the king may award is the Order of Charles III to "citizens who, with their effort, initiative and work, have brought a distinguished and extraordinary service to the Nation". The Laureate Cross of Saint Ferdinand is Spain's highest military award for gallantry. Other orders, decorations, and medals include the Order of Isabella the Catholic, the Order of Alfonso X, the Royal and Military Order of Saint Hermenegild, the Order of Saint Raimundo de Penafort, the Order of Military Merit, the Order of Naval Merit, the Order of Aerial Merit, the Order of Civil Merit, the Order of Cultural Merit, the Order of Calatrava, the Order of the Knights of Santiago, the Order of Sant Jordi d'Alfama, and the Order of Alcántara, among others.

=== Inviolability and lèse-majesté ===
The Spanish monarch is personally immune from prosecution for acts committed by government ministers in the king's name. Although he is nominally chief executive, he is not responsible for exercising his powers. His acts are only valid if countersigned by a minister, who then assumes political and legal responsibility for the act in question. This legal convention mirrors the concept of sovereign immunity which evolved in similar constitutional monarchies. The legal concept of sovereign immunity evolved into other aspects of immunity law in similar liberal democracies, such as parliamentary immunity, judicial immunity, and qualified immunity in the United States. As the reigning monarch the king of Spain has absolute sovereign immunity, he cannot be charged in any court of law in the Spanish state. This immunity applies to both civil and criminal cases. Sovereign immunity is reserved exclusively for the current holder of the Office of King. It does not apply to any other member of the royal family. When Juan Carlos I abdicated the throne to his successor Felipe VI he automatically forfeited his constitutional sovereign immunity and can be charged in a court of law. However, special legislation was passed by parliament prior to his abdication that states he may only be tried by Spain's Supreme Court and no other.

The Person of the King of Spain is inviolable and shall not be held accountable. His acts shall always be countersigned in the manner established in section 64. Without such countersignature they shall not be valid, except as provided under section 65(2).

— Title II The Crown, Article 56, the Spanish Constitution of 1978. (Note: Spanish: La persona del Rey de España es inviolable y no está sujeta a responsabilidad. Sus actos estarán siempre refrendados en la forma establecida en el artículo 64, careciendo de validez sin dicho refrendo, salvo lo dispuesto en el artículo 65,2.)

The concept of lèse-majesté (lesa-majestad) exists in Spanish jurisprudence, which is the crime or offense violating the dignity of the head-of-state or the State itself. According to Article 56 of the 1978 Constitution the monarch and the dignity of the Spanish State are one and the same: "The King is Head of State, the symbol of its unity and permanence". Breaching Spain's lèse-majesté laws may carry fines and up to two years in prison. The concept is within the same legal sphere as legislation prohibiting flag desecration in other democratic countries. Additionally, lèse-majesté extends to any foreign heads-of-state visiting Spain, and other members of the royal family, and to the Spanish President of the Government as the king's appointed officer.

The Spanish satirical magazine El Jueves was fined for violation of Spain's lèse-majesté laws after publishing an issue with a caricature of the Prince and Princess of Asturias engaging in sexual intercourse on their cover in 2007. In 2008, 400 Catalonia separatists burned images of the king and queen in Madrid, and in 2009 two Galician separatists were fined for burning effigies of the king.

=== Succession and regency ===
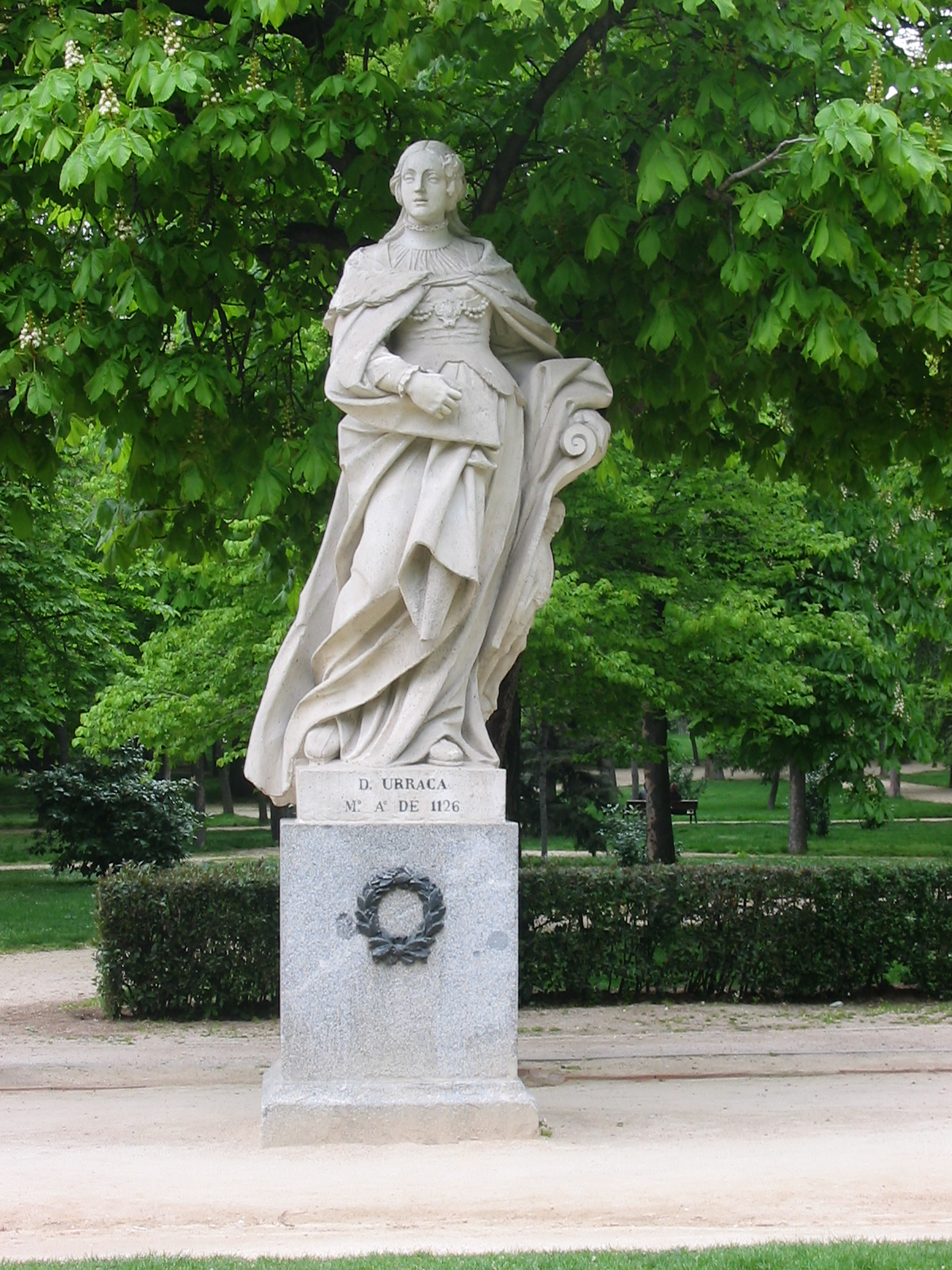
Statue of Queen Urraca in the Parque del Buen Retiro in Madrid. Urraca succeeded as queen in 1108.

According to Article 57 the Crown of Spain is inherited by the successors of King Juan Carlos I de Borbón through male preference primogeniture. While drafting the new constitution, lawyer and liberal congressman Joaquín Satrústegui (1909–1992) insisted that the phrase "the legitimate heir of the historic dynasty" be included in the text to underscore that the monarchy was a historic institution predating the constitution or the prior regime.

The Crown of Spain shall be inherited by the successors of HM Juan Carlos I de Borbón, the legitimate heir of the historic dynasty. Succession to the throne shall follow the regular order of primogeniture and representation, the first line having preference over subsequent lines; and within the same line the closer grade over the more remote; and within the same grade the male over female, and in the same sex, the elder over the younger.

— Title II the Crown, Article 57 (1), the Spanish Constitution of 1978. (Note: Spanish: La Corona de España es hereditaria en los sucesores de S. M. Don Juan Carlos I de Borbón, legítimo heredero de la dinastía histórica. La sucesión en el trono seguirá el orden regular de primogenitura y representación, siendo preferida siempre la línea anterior a las posteriores; en la misma línea, el grado más próximo al más remoto; en el mismo grado, el varón a la mujer, y en el mismo sexo, la persona de más edad a la de menos.)

Male-preference cognatic primogeniture has been practiced in Spain since the 11th century in the various Visigothic successor states and codified in the Siete Partidas, with women able to inherit in certain circumstances. However, with the succession of Philip V in 1700, the first of the Spanish Bourbons, women were barred from succession until Ferdinand VII reintroduced the right and designated his elder daughter Isabella as his heir presumptive by 1833.

The debate on amending the Crown's succession law came to the forefront on 31 October 2005, when Infanta Leonor was born to the current King and Queen of Spain. Amending the law to absolute primogeniture would allow the first-born to inherit the throne, whether the heir be male or female. The Zapatero administration of the day proclaimed its intention to amend the succession law; however, with the birth of the king's second daughter the issue was postponed. Paving the way, in 2006 King Juan Carlos issued a decree reforming the succession to noble titles from male preference primogeniture to absolute primogeniture. Since the order of succession to the Crown is codified in the Constitution, its reform mandates a complicated process that involves a dissolution of parliament, a constitutional election, and a referendum.

If all lines designated by law become extinct, the constitution reserves the right for the Cortes Generales to provide for the succession "in the manner most suitable for Spain". The 1978 constitution disinherits members of the royal family (as well as their descendants) from succession if they marry against the expressed prohibition of the monarch and the Cortes Generales. Lastly, Article 57 further provides that "Abdications and renunciations and any doubt in fact or in law that may arise in connection with the succession to the Crown shall be settled by an organic act".

Constitutionally, the current heirs of Felipe VI are:

King Juan Carlos I (b. 1938)
  - King Felipe VI (born 1968)
    - (1) Leonor, Princess of Asturias (b. 2005)
    - (2) Infanta Sofía (b. 2007)
  - (3) Infanta Elena, Duchess of Lugo (b. 1963)
    - (4) Don Felipe de Marichalar y Borbón, Lord of Tejada (b. 1998)
    - (5) Doña Victoria de Marichalar y Borbón, Lady of Tejada (b. 2000)
  - (6) Infanta Cristina (b. 1965)
    - (7) Don Juan Urdangarin y Borbón (b. 1999)
    - (8) Don Pablo Urdangarin y Borbón (b. 2000)
    - (9) Don Miguel Urdangarin y Borbón (b. 2002)
    - (10) Doña Irene Urdangarin y Borbón (b. 2005)

The constitution outlines the regency of the monarchy and guardianship of the person of the monarch in the event of his minority or incapacitation. The office of Regent(s) and the Guardianship of the monarch (whether the monarch is in his minority or incapacitated) may not necessarily be the same person. In the event of the minority of the monarch, the surviving mother or father, or oldest relative of legal age who is nearest in line to the throne, would immediately assume the office of Regent, who in any case must be Spanish. If a monarch becomes incapacitated, and that incapacitation is recognized by the Cortes Generales, then the Prince of Asturias (the heir apparent), shall immediately become Regent, if he is of age. If the Prince of Asturias is himself a minor, then the Cortes Generales shall appoint a Regency which may be composed of one, three, or five persons. The person of the king in his minority shall fall under the guardianship of the person designated in the will of the deceased monarch, provided that he or she be of age and of Spanish nationality. If no guardian has been appointed in the will, then the father or mother will then assume the guardianship, as long as they remain widowed. Otherwise, the Cortes Generales shall appoint both the Regent(s) and the guardian, who in this case may not be held by the same person, except by the father or mother of direct relation of the king.

=== King, the government, and the Cortes Generales ===
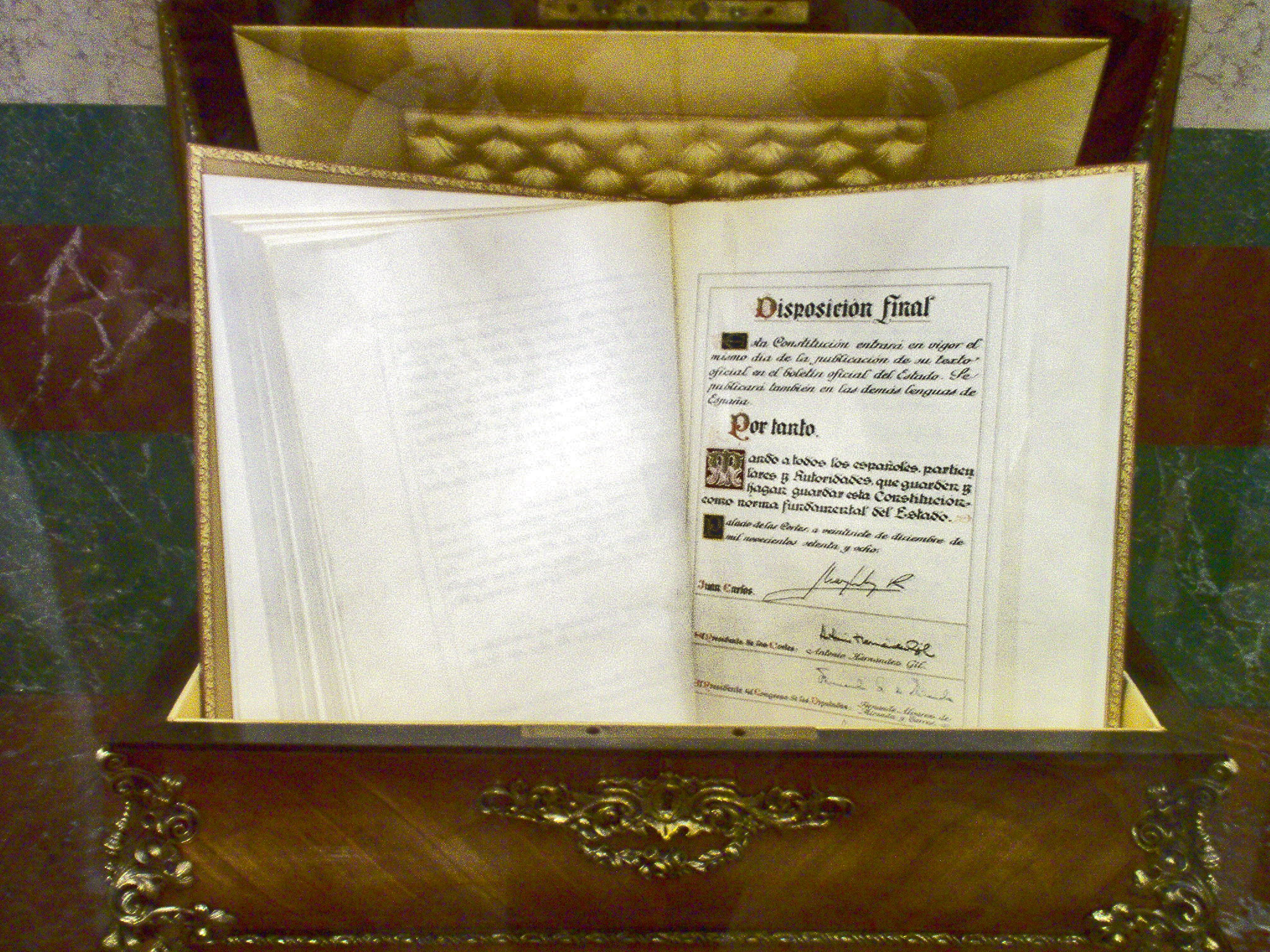
A copy of the Spanish Constitution, signed by King Juan Carlos, is held at the Palace of the Cortes.

The constitution defines the government's responsibilities. The government consists of the President of the Government and ministers of state. The government conducts domestic and foreign policy, civil and military administration, and the defense of the nation all in the name of the king. Additionally, the government exercises executive authority and statutory regulations. The most direct prerogative the monarch exercises in the formation of Spanish governments is in the nomination and appointment process of the President of the Government (Presidente del Gobierno de España). (Note: The President of the Government is usually known as the prime minister in many English language publications as the title president, outside of academic and business circles, has a republican connotation absent in the Spanish presidente.) Following the General Election of the Cortes Generales (Cortes), and other circumstances provided for in the constitution, the king meets with and interviews the political party leaders represented in the Cortes, and then consults with the Speaker of the Congress (who, in this instance, represents the whole of the Cortes Generales).

1. After each renewal of the Congress and the other cases provided for under the Constitution, the King shall, after consultation with the representatives appointed by the political groups with parliamentary representation, and through the Speaker of the Congress, nominate for the Presidency of the Government.
2. The candidate nominated in accordance with the provisions of the foregoing subsection shall submit to the Congress the political program of the Government he or she intends to form and shall seek the confidence of the House.

— Title II Government and Administration, Article 99 (1) & (2), the Spanish Constitution of 1978. (Note: Spanish: Artículo 99. # Después de cada renovación del Congreso de los Diputados, y en los demás supuestos constitucionales en que así proceda, el Rey, previa consulta con los representantes designados por los grupos políticos con representación parlamentaria, y a través del Presidente del Congreso, propondrá un candidato a la Presidencia del Gobierno. # El candidato propuesto conforme a lo previsto en el apartado anterior expondrá ante el Congreso de los Diputados el programa político del Gobierno que pretenda formar y solicitará la confianza de la Cámara.)

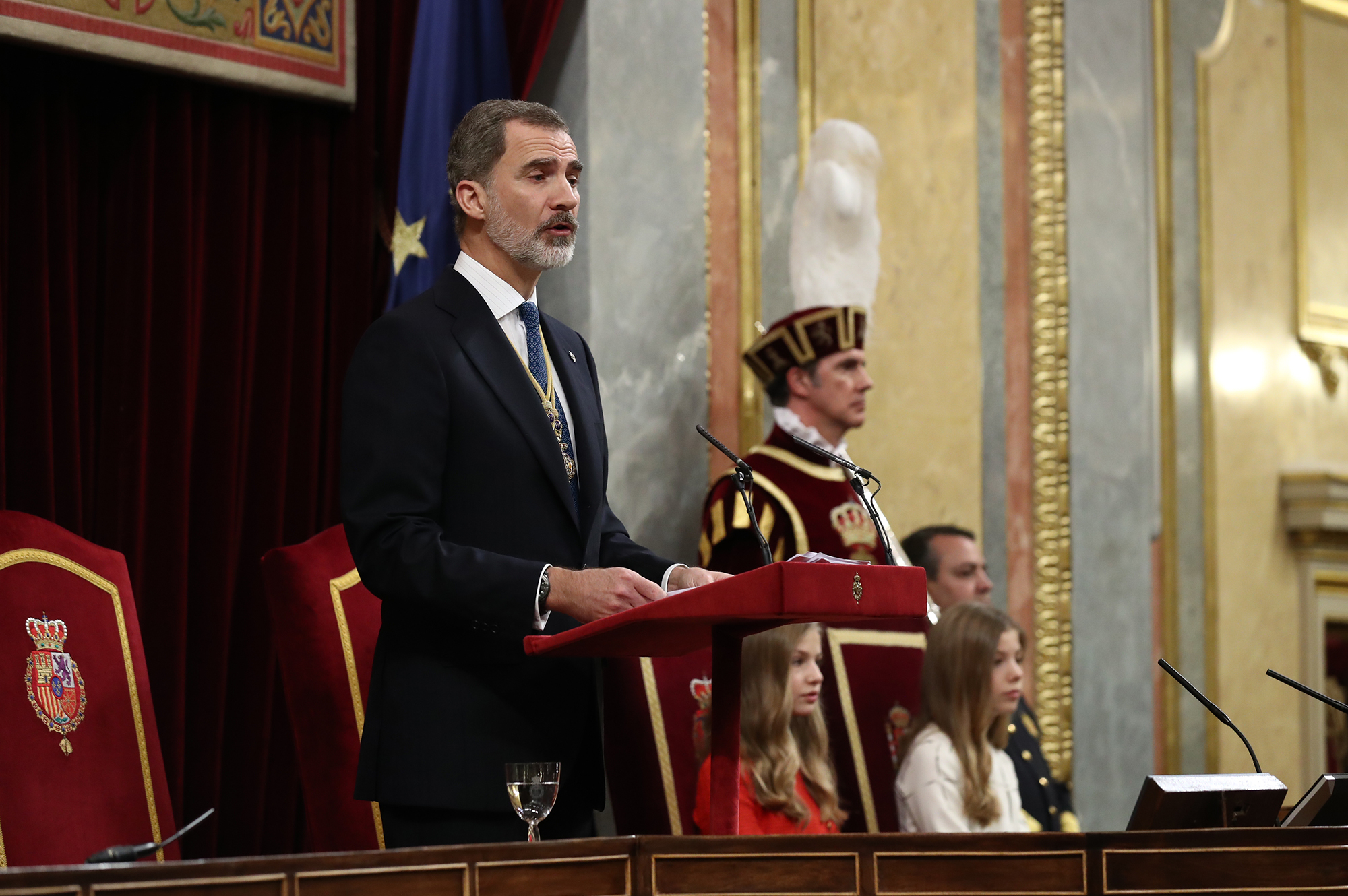
King Felipe VI addressing Parliament in the opening session of the 14th Cortes Generales

Constitutionally, the monarch may nominate anyone he sees fit as is his prerogative. However, it remains pragmatic for him to nominate the person most likely to enjoy the confidence of the Cortes and form a government, usually the political leader whose party commands the most seats in the Cortes. For the Crown to nominate the political leader whose party controls the Cortes can be seen as a royal endorsement of the democratic process, a fundamental concept enshrined in the 1978 constitution. By political custom, the king's nominees have all been from parties who hold the most seats in the Cortes. The king is normally able to announce his nominee the day following a general election.

The king's nominee is presented before the Cortes by the Speaker where the nominee and his political agenda are debated and submitted for a Vote of Confidence (Cuestión de confianza) by the Cortes. A simple majority confirms the nominee and his program. After the nominee is deemed confirmed by the Speaker of the Congress of Deputies, the king appoints him as the new President of the Government in a ceremony performed at the Salón de Audiencias in the la Zarzuela Palace, the official residence of the king. During the inauguration ceremony, the President of the Government takes an oath of office over an open Constitution next to the Bible. The oath as taken by President Zapatero on his second term in office on 17 April 2004 was:

I swear, under my conscience and honor, to faithfully execute the duties of the office of President of the Government with loyalty to the King, obey and enforce the Constitution as the main law of the State, and preserve in secret the deliberations of the Council of Ministers.

— Oath of office of President Rodríguez Zapatero, given before the king 17 April 2004, La Zarzuela. (Note: Spanish: Juro/Prometo, por mi conciencia y honor, cumplir fielmente las obligaciones del cargo de Presidente del Gobierno con lealtad al Rey, guardar y hacer guardar la Constitución como norma fundamental del Estado, así como mantener el secreto de las deliberaciones del Consejo de Ministros.)

However, if no overall majority was obtained on the first vote of confidence, then the same nominee and program is resubmitted for a second vote within forty-eight hours. Following the second vote, if confidence by the Cortes is still unreached, then the monarch again meets with political leaders and the Speaker, and submits a new nominee for a vote of confidence. If, within two months, no candidate has won the confidence of the Cortes then the king dissolves the Cortes and calls for a new general election. The king's royal decree is countersigned by the Speaker of the Congress.

In the political life of Spain, the king would already be familiar with the various political leaders in a professional capacity, and perhaps less formally in a more social capacity, facilitating their meeting following a general election. Conversely, nominating the party leader whose party maintains a plurality and who are already familiar with their party manifesto facilitates a smoother nomination process. In the event of coalitions, the political leaders would customarily have met beforehand to hammer out a coalition agreements before their meeting with the king. Once appointed, the President of the Government forms an administration whose ministers are appointed and removed by the king on the president's advice. No minister may take up his appointment until after they give their oath of office to obey the constitution with loyalty to the king.

As early as 1975, Juan Carlos expressed his view that his role in the government of a "crowned democracy" would be for him to counsel and orient an administration's "thrust in action", but for the government to take the initiative without the need for it to involve the king unnecessarily in its decisions. Therefore, Juan Carlos abstained from presiding over cabinet meetings except under special occasions or circumstances. Generally, the king presides over cabinet meetings once or twice a year (more regularly if needed) to be directly informed by ministers of non-partisan national and international concerns. However, the king does meet weekly, usually on Tuesday mornings, with the President of the Government. (Note: An exception to these weekly meetings is in August, while the king is on holiday in Majorca. Then the President or the Vice President travels to Majorica to meet with the king.) During the late-2000s economic recession which gripped the nation, the king discreetly used his influence to facilitate a bi-partisan response to the crisis.

Governments and the Cortes sit for a term no longer than four years when the president tenders his resignation to the king and advises the king to dissolve the Cortes, prompting a general election. It remains within the king's prerogative to dissolve the Cortes if, at the conclusion of the four years, the president has not asked for its dissolution, according to Title II Article 56. (Note: Title II Article 56 the monarch is the "arbitrator and moderator of the regular functioning of the institutions" (Spanish: arbitra y modera el funcionamiento regular de las instituciones)) The president may call for earlier elections, but no sooner than a year after the prior general election. Additionally, if the Government loses the confidence of the Cortes, then it must resign. In the event that a president dies or becomes incapacitated while in office, then the government as a whole resigns and the process of royal nomination and appointment takes place. The vice president would take over the day-to-day operations in the meantime, even while vice president himself may be nominated by the king.

=== Royal assent, judiciary, and promulgation of the laws ===
The constitution vests the sanction (royal assent) and promulgation (publication) of the laws with the king, while Title III The Cortes Generals, Chapter 2 Drafting of Bills outlines the method with which bills are passed. According to Article 91, within fifteen days that a bill has been passed by the Cortes Generales, the king shall give his assent and publish the new law. Article 92 invests the king with the right to call for referendum on the advice of the president and the previous authorization of Congress.

No provision within the constitution invests the king with the ability to veto legislation directly; however, no provision prohibits the king from withholding royal assent, effectively a veto. When the media asked King Juan Carlos if he would endorse the 2005 bill legalizing gay marriages (the implication being that he may not endorse the bill), he answered "Soy el Rey de España y no el de Bélgica" ("I am the King of Spain, not of Belgium") – a reference to King Baudouin of Belgium who had refused to sign the Belgian law legalising abortion in Belgium.

According to Title VI of the constitution, Justice in Spain "emanates from the people and is administered on behalf of the King by judges and magistrates members of the Judicial Power". It remains a royal prerogative for the king to appoint the twenty members to the General Council of the Judicial Power of Spain (Spain's Supreme Court), and then appoint the President of the Supreme Court nominated by the General Council, according to Article 122, Subsection 3, of the constitution. However, by convention the king's nominations have been with the advice of the government of the day.

The General Council of the Judicial Power shall consist of the President of the Supreme Court, who shall preside over it, and of twenty members appointed by the King for a five-year period, of which twelve shall be judges and magistrates of all the judicial categories, under the terms provided for by the organic act; four nominated by the Congress and four by the Senate, elected in both cases by three-fifths of their members amongst lawyers and other jurists of acknowledged competence with more than fifteen years of professional practice.

— Title VI Judicial Power, Article 122 (3). (Note: Spanish: Consejo General del Poder Judicial estará integrado por el Presidente del Tribunal Supremo, que lo presidirá, y por veinte miembros nombrados por el Rey por un periodo de cinco años. De estos, doce entre Jueces y Magistrados de todas las categorías judiciales, en los términos que establezca la ley orgánica; cuatro a propuesta del Congreso de los Diputados, y cuatro a propuesta del Senado, elegidos en ambos casos por mayoría de tres quintos de sus miembros, entre abogados y otros juristas, todos ellos de reconocida competencia y con más de quince años de ejercicio en su profesión.)

Additionally, the king appoints the State Public Prosecutor on the advice of the government, according to Article 124. The king may grant clemency in accordance with the law; however, the king may not authorize a general pardon of government ministers who have been found criminally liable or guilty of treason by the Criminal Article of the Supreme Court, according to Articles 62 and 102.

=== King and international diplomacy ===
Members of the Organization of Ibero-American States. King Felipe VI serves as president.

Constitutionally the king accredits Spanish ambassadors to international states and governments, and foreign representatives to Spain are accredited before him. However, the government of the day manages diplomatic policy on behalf of the monarch. Additionally, it remains the responsibility for the monarch to express the state's assent to international commitments and treaties, which must be in conformity with the Spanish constitution.

During his reign, Juan Carlos followed a foreign policy during the first decade of his kingship coined Reencounter and Reconciliation, which greatly improved Spain's standing on the world stage. The king reconciled long standing historic tensions with the Netherlands and cultivated relationships with France and Germany which led directly to Spain's entry into the European Community and into NATO. Following the tensions between Franco and the Papacy over the reforms of the Second Vatican Council, Juan Carlos' personal relations with successive popes greatly improved diplomatic relations between the Holy See and Spain, and with Pope Paul VI blessing Juan Carlos' democratic reforms. (Note: Juan Carlos' had a special relationship with Pope Paul VI whose death greatly affected the king.) According to historian Charles Powell, it was the king's goal to win Spain's full acceptance by other European powers. The king, a self-described Europeanist, was awarded the prestigious Charlemagne Award in 1982 for his steadfast work towards democracy and for supporting European unity. The constitution gives the monarch special responsibility in promoting Spanish relations with members of its historic community, the nations formerly part of the Spanish Empire and also relations with Portugal and Brazil. Fulfilling this responsibility, the king of Spain serves as president of the twenty-three member Ibero-American States Organization. With his support of democracy, various elements within Ibero-America political society have sought the king's advice on how to transition from a dictatorship to a democracy. For his efforts, by 2008 the king was voted the most popular leader in all of the Ibero-American community.

The monarch is assisted in his diplomatic missions by the Foreign Ministry, and high-ranking members of the Foreign Ministry are made available to the king when he is abroad representing Spain. The royal household coordinates with the Foreign Ministry to ensure successful diplomatic engagements. Additionally, other members of the royal family, most notably the Prince of Asturias, may represent the Spanish State internationally. Though the Spanish monarchy is independent of the government, it is important that royal speeches are compatible with government foreign policy to project a unified diplomatic effort. To achieve balance, royal household speechwriters confer with the Foreign Ministry to ensure that the official speeches strike the desired diplomatic tone between the king's views and government policy. (Note: The king's speeches are generally reflective of the king's views and reviewed by the king before an event. When confirming with the Foreign Ministry, the speeches are reviewed so that they are largely general in nature and politically neutral in terms of specific policies followed by the government.) When necessary and appropriate, the king and his government may focus on two different aspects in a diplomatic engagement. The king may emphasize one aspect, such as the promotion of democracy and historic relations; while the government focuses on the details of strategic planning and bilateral coordination.

The king and members of the royal family have represented Spain in Europe, Latin America, in the United States and in Canada, nations in the Middle East and North Africa, in China, Japan, the Philippines, Australia, New Zealand and many countries in sub-Sahara Africa. The king and Prince of Asturias have addressed many international organizations which include the United Nations, the institutions of the European Union, the Council of Europe, the Organization of American States, UNESCO, the International Labour Organization, and the Arab League. Since 2000, Felipe has represented Spain in half of all diplomatic engagements.

=== King as Commander-in-Chief ===
Emblem of Spanish Armed Forces

The role of the Crown in the Spanish Armed Forces is rooted in tradition and patriotism as demonstrated in the symbols and the history of the military. The role of the Spanish monarch in the chain of command of the forces is established by the constitution of 1978, and other statutory law – Acts of Parliament, Royal Decrees etc.

It is incumbent upon the King ... to exercise Supreme Command of the Armed Forces.

— Title II The Crown, Article 62 (H), the Spanish Constitution of 1978.

The King exercises Supreme Command of the Armed Forces and other powers regarding national defense that are provided for in the constitution and other laws.

— Title I (Of the powers of the State), Article 3 (The Crown), National Defense Act, November 17, 2005

However, Title IV of the constitution vests the administration of the armed forces and formulation of national defense policy with the President of the Government, a civil officer who is nominated and appointed by the king, confirmed by the elected Congress of Deputies and, as such, is representative of the Spanish people.

Royal Decree 1310 of 5 October 2007 requires the National Defence Council to report to the monarch, and that the king is to be the Chairman of the Council when he attends its sessions. The National Defence Council is Spain's highest advisory body on defense matters, while the National Security Council is focused on national security and international affairs. King Juan Carlos chaired the first full meeting of the council on 10 November 2007, at which the newly proposed National Defence Directive was reviewed along with the ongoing war missions in Afghanistan, Kosovo, Bosnia and Lebanon.

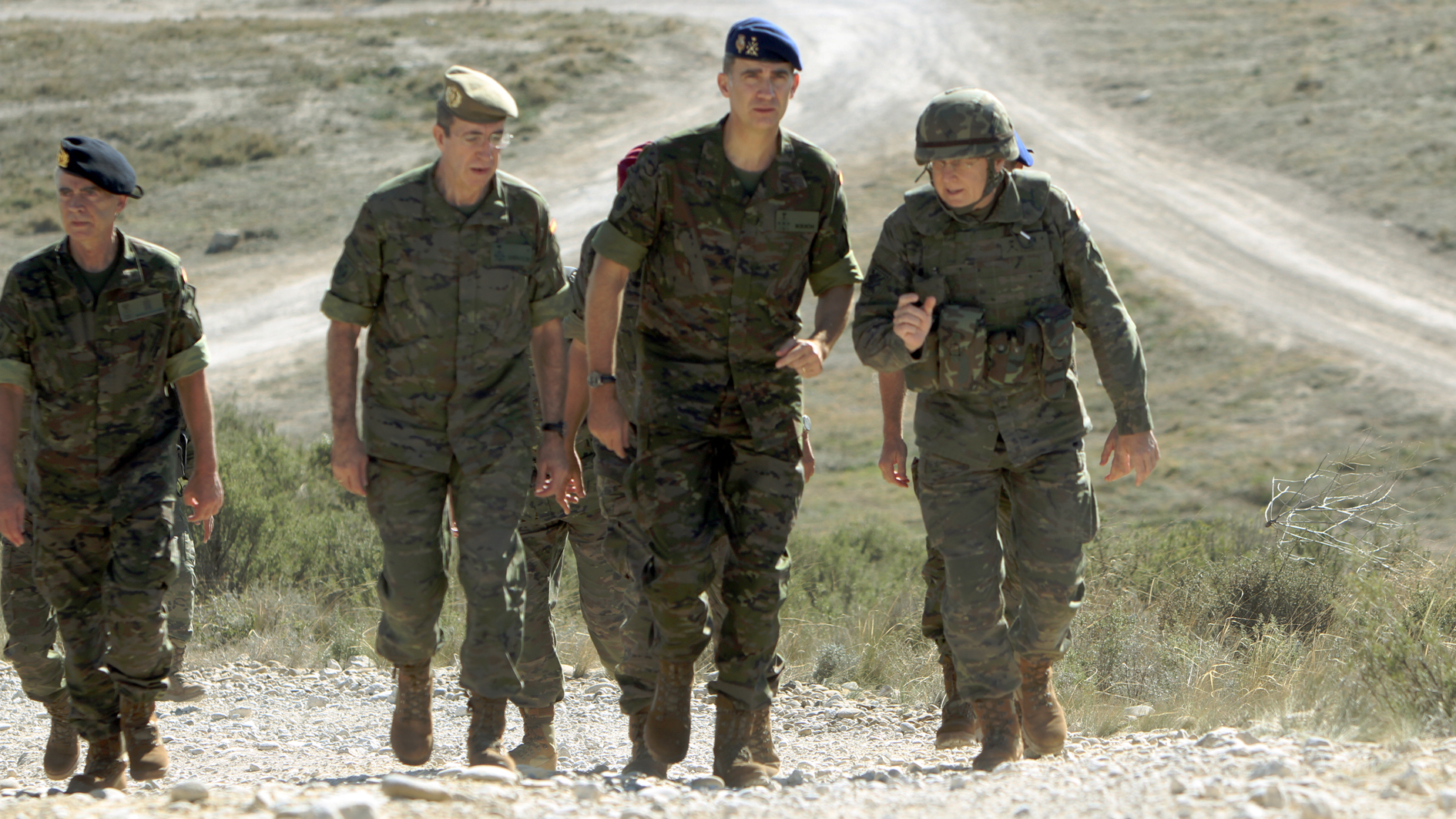
King Felipe VI attends a NATO exercise in Zaragoza, 2015

As commander-in-chief of the armed forces, the king holds the highest-ranking office in the military chain of command. The king's ranks include Captain General of the Army, the Navy and the Air and Space Force. The king is the only officer in the military to hold this five-star rank (OF-10). The king takes a keen interest in all aspects of military policy as evidenced by "his direct participation in the life of the Spanish Armed Forces". The king's participation in Spanish military life stems from his constitutional duty to "arbitrate and moderate" the regular working of state institutions. Serving in the armed forces is considered an expectation of the heir apparent; Juan Carlos I and Felipe VI served in the various branches of the armed forces before they became kings. Leonor, Princess of Asturias is currently undergoing military training. The monarch has made his desire for a strong rapport with the armed forces clear in speeches to his officer corps:

I do not feel a stranger in your company, and my functions are not limited to being your king and to holding the Supreme Command of the Armed Forces. I am also your companion ... I feel one more among you ... because my youth has been formed, as yours and with many of you, in military academies where virtues are praised and qualities infused which are not modified by time or by the changes that may occur in society ... In my heart, in all my being, side by side with my love for the country, palpitates military spirit, and I feel always identified with my companions in the army, with your concerns, your sorrows, your satisfactions and your hopes. So when I see you joyful, I am joyful. When I feel You sad, I am sad. And all, absolutely all of your worries, all absolutely all of your problems gravitate on your king and Captain General-your companion-with the same intensity that is felt by you.

— Juan Carlos's Pascua Militar speech, 1980

== Contemporary monarchy ==
=== Popularity and criticism ===
Prior to the Spanish financial crisis from 2008, the monarchy traditionally enjoyed wide support and popularity by Spanish citizens since its constitutional restoration in 1978, according to Fernando Villespin, president of the Centro de Investigaciones Sociológicas (CIS, English: Sociological Research Center) in 2008. According to Villespin, the king's traditional approval rating of over 70% through the years consistently out-performed those of elected political leaders, with a similar percentage of respondents considering that the king played an important role in maintaining Spanish democracy. Public trust in Juan Carlos' kingship "comes only behind that of the National Ombudsman", Villespin continued. Members of the royal family were routinely voted among the most respected public figures in Spain, and in 2010 as many as 75% of Spanish citizens ranked the monarchy as "above any other public institution in the country", according to Juan Díez-Nicolás, a former president of the CIS and founder of the private consulting firm ASEP (Análisis Sociológicos Económicos y Políticos). (Note: Juan Díez Nicolás, is a Professor of Sociology since 1971 and co-founder (1963–69) and last Director General (1976–77) of the former Instituto de la Opinión Pública, as well as the first Director General (1977–1979) of the present Centro de Investigaciones Sociológicas (CIS), both within the public administration. During the political transition to democracy (1973–1982) he occupied several high public offices, he has been President of the Spanish Federation of Sociology (1995–98), President of the Forum for the Social Integration of Immigrants (1999–2002) and Vice-President of Members and Finances of the International Sociological Association (ISA). Currently he is Elected Member of the European Academy of Sciences and Arts, member of the High-Level Advisory Group on Dialogue between Peoples and Cultures of the Mediterranean (personally appointed by the President of the European Commission), member of the Executive Committee of the World Values Survey Association, and member of different scientific and advisory committees.) The CIS, a non-partisan government funded independent research institution, has been researching public opinion of the monarchy since 1984 and tracks three basic lines of inquiry; what is public confidence in the monarchy, what is the role of the monarchy in a democratic system, and to what degree has the king contributed to the democratic process.

The king was routinely considered one of the top ten most popular figures in Spain, with as many as 80% of Spanish believing Spain's transition to democracy would not have been made possible without the king's personal intervention. Historian and royal biographer Charles Powell told BBC News in 2008 that "There's a deep-rooted feeling of gratitude for the king's role in the transition to democracy [and] Polls show that he is the individual to whom democratisation is most closely attributed, and the sense of gratitude cuts across class and ideological lines."

Prior to the economic crisis, part of the monarchy's appeal may lay in the personal characteristics of Juan Carlos, whose philosophy on his family, on personal integrity, and on a selfless work ethic were revealed in intimate private letters of fatherly advice to his son Felipe, Prince of Asturias, between 1984 and 1985, when Felipe was then attending university in Canada. According to Juan Carlos a monarch must not take his position for granted but work for the people's welfare, be kind, attentive and helpful, and "appear animated even when you are tired; kind even when you don't feel like it; attentive even when you are not interested; helpful even when it takes an effort [...] You need to appear natural, but not vulgar; cultivated and aware of problems, but not pedantic or conceited".

Juan Carlos continued;

Those whom God has chosen to be kings and to be at the head of the destiny of a country do not have any other choice than to start to understand the importance and the special characteristics of the position, because one can say that they start to become adults long before other boys of their age. If in this life it is as important to form and strengthen character enough to permit us to lead, it is not any less to know how to obey. In spite of the high positions that we hold in life, it will always be vital to know we also have duties to perform and obedience always involves real honour [...] We have to build a closely united family, without fissures or contradictions, we must not forget that on all and on each one of us are fixed the eyes of Spaniards whom we should serve with body and soul. I do not want to prolong my first letter any more in order not to tire you, but I would hope that this as well as the succeeding ones I send you leave a profound impression on you and are read calmly and thought about seriously.

— King Juan Carlos I to Felipe, Prince of Asturias, 1984.

"I have had to stand snubs and contempt, incomprehension and annoyances that you, thank God, have not known", reminded the king to his son in one letter. The private letters from father to son remain within the royal household, but were copied and released into the public domain without any approval or foreknowledge, according to a Zarzuela palace official who confirmed the letter's authenticity.

However, the monarchy became the focus of acute criticism from part of the left and right of the Spanish political spectrum, and by regional separatists. As many as 22% of Spanish citizens feel that a republic would be the better form of government for Spain, while separatists and independence supporters in the Basque Country and Catalonia routinely protest the monarchy as the living symbol of a united Spain. Part of the left criticize the institution of monarchy as anachronistic, while the far right criticize King Juan Carlos personally because he has given his royal assent and tacit approval to what they perceive to be a liberal agenda in Spain and a secularism of Spanish life. (Note: Conservative radio talk show host Federico Jimenez Losantos of the Cadena COPE radio network, owned and operated by Spain's Roman Catholic Church, called for Juan Carlos to abdicate for his tacit approval of a perceived liberal agenda.)

The monarchy became subject to sharpened criticism during the financial crisis, particularly 2012 which became a kind of "annus horribilis" for the monarchy, as members of the royal family became increasingly seen as out-of-step with the Spanish mainstream or drawn into scandal. Queen Sofía was criticized in 2008 for inarticulately disclosing her private opinions on gay marriage in a biography publicly released that year. In 2011 the king's son-in-law Iñaki Urdangarin, Duke of Palma de Mallorca, was accused of money laundering and impropriety for using his connection to the royal family for personal financial gain. In April 2012 the king's grandson, 13-year-old Froilán, shot himself in the foot during target practice at his father's estate, echoing a similar but far more serious gun accident involving the king in 1956. According to historians, the then 18-year-old Juan Carlos was cleaning a revolver when he accidentally shot to death his 14-year-old brother Alfonso. Also in 2012, the monarchy was seen as out-of-touch during the financial crisis as the king went on a hunting safari in Botswana while Spanish citizens suffered crippling unemployment and austerity measures at home. Furthermore, sporting a hunting vest and rifle the king was photographed over a dead elephant propped against a tree. Despite public knowledge of the king's interest in hunting, the image this time contrasted sharply with his patronage of the Spanish branch of the conservation group World Wildlife Fund. Though elephant hunting is legal on the game preserve in Botswana, the World Wildlife Fund lists elephants as an endangered species, and the public outcry led to the WWF to strip the king of his honorary patronage in July 2012. With the perceived disconnect public support of the monarchy has dropped to a new low of only 49%, according to a December 2011 Metroscopia survey.

The king took measures to restore public confidence in the monarchy. In the wake of the scandal surrounding the Duke of Palma de Mallorca, the king spoke in his 2011 Christmas Eve National Speech that no-one is above the law. Additionally, the king addressed the perennial critique of the monarchy by publishing the budget spent on the monarchy and royal household. In 2012, the king and Prince of Asturias volunteered an additional 7% pay-cut in solidarity with government officials, bringing the king's taxable income for 2012 at about 270,000 euros, and that of the prince at 131,000 euros. Of the events surrounding the safari, the contrite king issued a rare apology and said "I am very sorry. I made a mistake. It will not happen again." Furthermore, the king and the Prince of Asturias stepped up public engagements, particularly those of a business nature, in an effort to promote "Brand Spain", as the king put it as he answered written questions. The king's mantra for Spanish business; "Export, export, export!" Spanish business magnates rallied to the king's cause; "From a corporate point of view, King Juan Carlos is Spain's No. 1 ambassador," said César Alierta, chairman of the Spanish telecommunications giant Telefónica. The king is also credited with brokering a deal worth $9.9 billion for a Spanish consortium in Saudi Arabia to construct a high-speed rail line by leveraging his personal relationship with Saudi King Abdullah and outmaneuvering a French bid. "Without the king, this contract would not have gone ahead," according to former Spanish foreign minister Miguel Angel Moratinos. The king's role as a "business diplomat and deal maker" for his country's interest was brought to light during the safari scandal, as the safari was paid for by Mohamed Eyad Kayali, a Syrian construction magnate and longtime friend of the king. The two worked together on the deal which awarded the Haramain High Speed Rail Project to the Spanish consortium. For supporters of the monarchy the king is an "irreplaceable resource" with unrivaled relationships with other world leaders. Observers credit the king with easing tensions between Spain's former government of José Zapatero and the George W. Bush administration, while also helping to resolve disputes in Latin America.

Opinion polls released in April 2012 revealed that the Spanish public generally forgave the king over the recent scandals, but wished for greater transparency of the monarchy. However, criticism grew increasingly strident towards many senior members of the royal family as investigations continued to dominate headlines throughout 2013. In an act to preserve Spanish constitutional stability Juan Carlos I abdicated the throne on 19 June 2014, in favor of his popular son, now reigning as King Felipe VI.

At the time of his abdication La Razon found that more than 77 per cent of respondents rated the leadership of King Juan Carlos as "good" or "very good". Seventy-two per cent thought the monarchy was an important factor for political stability. The Spanish public also gave a broadly positive opinion not only of the abdication but of his reign as a whole. According to a poll taken by El Mundo, believed the king's reign was either good or very good, up from 41.3 per cent. Overall, 55.7 per cent of those polled in the 3–5 June survey by Sigma Dos supported the institution of the monarchy in Spain, up from 49.9 per cent when the same question was posed six months earlier. 57.5 per cent believed the Felipe VI could restore the royal family's lost prestige. An overwhelming majority of Spaniards believe Felipe VI would make a good monarch and more than three-quarters believe Juan Carlos was right to hand over the throne to his son.

In recent years, however, public opinion on the form of organization of the Head of State has become increasingly divided, with polls confirming a technical tie between monarchists and republicans since 2018.

Despite being hailed for his role in Spain's transition to democracy, King Juan Carlos I and the monarchy's reputation began to suffer after controversies surrounding his family arose, exacerbated by the public controversy centering on an elephant-hunting trip he undertook during a time of financial crisis in Spain. Since August 2020, Juan Carlos has lived in self-exile from Spain over allegedly improper ties to business deals in Saudi Arabia.

During the COVID-19 pandemic in Spain, it became known on 2 March 2021 that the two sisters of King Felipe, the Infantas Cristina and Elena, had travelled to the United Arab Emirates in order to receive the vaccine and avoid the waiting of the Spanish protocol.

According to a poll made in 2020, 35 per cent of Spaniards would vote for the monarchy in a referendum, while 41 per cent would choose the republic. Right-wing supporters are the most monarchist, and left-wing supporters the most republican. On the other hand, a poll made in 2021 showed a different result: 58 per cent would choose the monarchy, while 37 rejects it.

=== Charitable, cultural, and religious patronage ===
Members of the royal family are often invited by non-profit charitable, cultural, or religious organizations within Spain or internationally to become their patrons, a role the Spanish constitution recognizes. Royal patronage conveys a sense of official credibility as the organization is vetted for suitability. A royal presence often greatly raises the profile of the organization and attracts public interest and media coverage that the organization may not have otherwise garnered, aiding in the charitable cause or cultural event. Royals use their considerable celebrity to assist the organization to raise funds or to affect or promote government policy.

Members of the royal family also pursue charitable and cultural causes of special interest to themselves. As prince, King Felipe chaired the Prince of Asturias Foundation (Fundación Príncipe de Asturias), which aims to promote "scientific, cultural and humanistic values that form part of mankind's universal heritage." The Prince of Asturias Foundation holds annual awards ceremonies acknowledging the contributions of individuals, entities, and organizations which make notable achievements in the sciences, humanities, or public affairs. Felipe serves as president of the Codespa Foundation, which finances specific economic and social development activities in Ibero-America and other countries, and serves as president of the Spanish branch of the Association of European Journalists, which is composed of achieving communications professionals. (Note: Felipe's interest in print journalism was revealed when he told an El País journalist that had he not been born a prince that he would have liked to be a print journalist, according to John Hooper in The New Spaniards.) Felipe also serves as honorary chair of the Ministry of Culture National Awards Ceremonies.

Queen Sofía devotes much of her time to the Queen Sofía Foundation (Fundación Reina Sofía). Established in 1977 out of the queen's private funds, the non-profit aims to assist, promote, and develop the spiritual and physical needs of men and women from diverse backgrounds, with a particular focus on progress, welfare, and justice. Infanta Elena, Duchess of Lugo, the king's eldest daughter, is the Director of Cultural and Social Projects of Mapfre Foundation, while Infanta Cristina, Duchess of Palma de Mallorca, the king's youngest daughter, served as the Goodwill Ambassador to the United Nations for the 2nd World Assembly on Ageing, and is a member of the Dalí Foundation Board of Trustees, president of the International Foundation for Disabled Sailing, and Director of Social Welfare at the La Caixa Foundation in Barcelona where she lives with her family.

The king, queen, and Infanta Cristina are all members of the Bilderberg Group, an informal think-tank centered on United States and European relations, and other world issues.

King Juan Carlos built a tradition of presenting annual Christmas Eve National Speeches entitled "Mensaje de S.M. Juan Carlos I", personal messages from himself as king to the nation which are broadcast by radio and television through various media outlets. King Juan Carlos usually referred to social or economic challenges facing the nation as well as positive messages of charity, good will, and religious faith. In 2004, the speech was highly related to the 2004 Madrid train bombings; in 2006 he talked about the need to become a united nation against terrorism (in implicit support of Zapatero's anti-terrorist policies), and he mentioned the increasing force of immigrants in Spain and appreciated their contribution to the economy.

== Household of the king ==
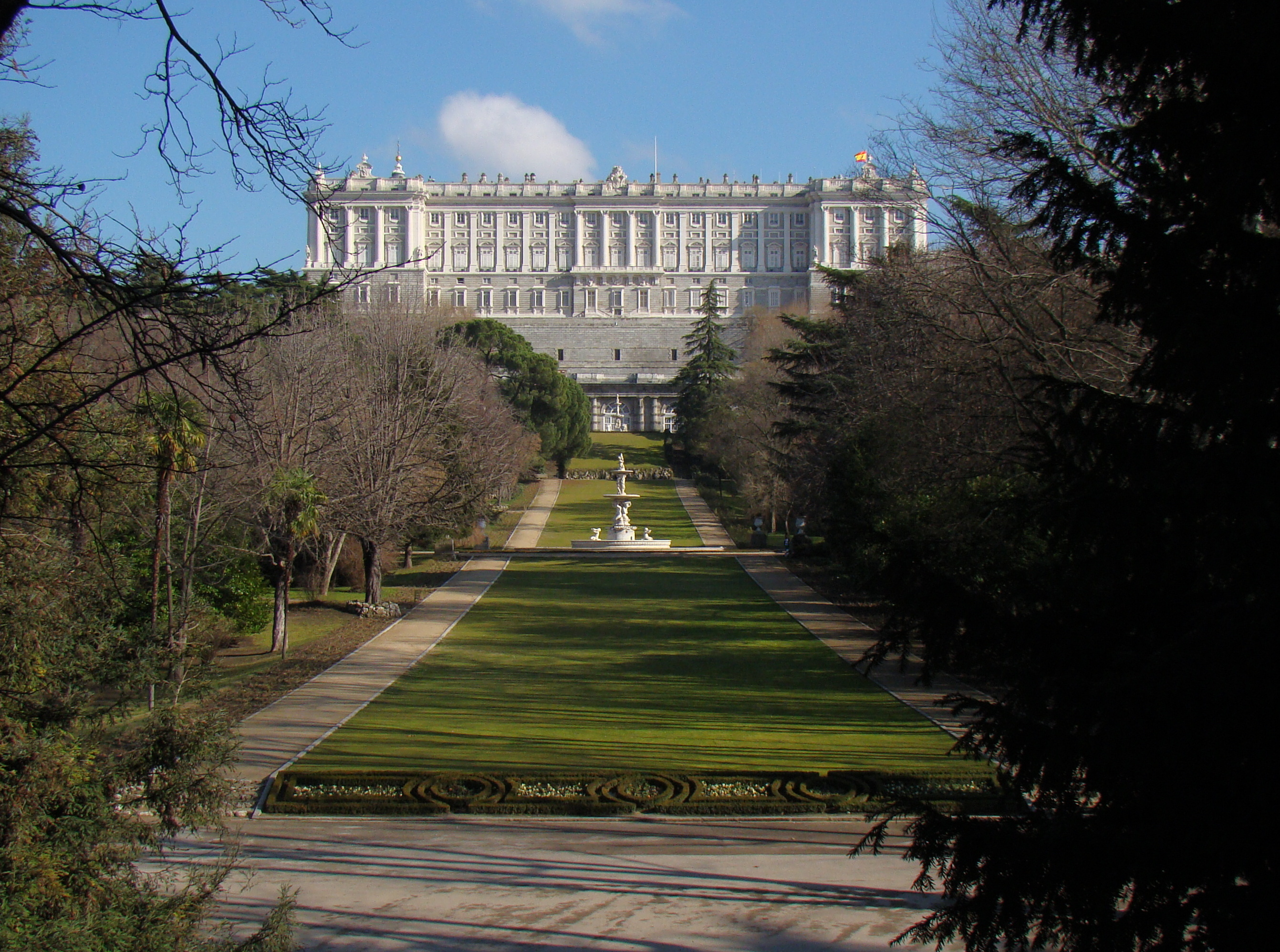
Royal Palace of Madrid

The royal household organization, constitutionally La Casa de Su Majestad el Rey, (Note: A literal translation is "House of H.M. the King", often translated into English as "royal house" or "royal household".) supports and facilitates the monarch and members of the royal family in fulfilling their constitutionally hereditary responsibilities and obligations. The royal household is funded through yearly budgets drafted by the government of the day in consultation with the monarch, and brought before the Cortes for approval, and then paid directly to the monarch. The royal household coordinates with various government administration ministries, and receives their advice and support where needed, though in no way does the royal household form part of the government administration. Royal household staff serve at the pleasure of the monarch, and does not resign when the Spanish government resigns during election cycles. The royal household is managed by the Head of the Household who inspects and supervises all household operations through various bureaus or offices of the General Secretariat. The Head of the Household is assisted by a Secretary General. The General Secretariat is divided into various departments which includes the secretariat (bureau) of King Juan Carlos (since 2014); planning and coordination; the secretariat (bureau) of H.M. the Queen; security services; communication; protocol; and administration, infrastructure and services. Before his father's abdication, Felipe VI had his own secretariat as Prince of Asturias.

The Spanish Armed Forces are represented by the Head of the Military Chamber, who does not advise the king on matters of national defense, which is the portfolio of the Minister of Defence and President of the Government to advise the king. Rather, the Head of the Military Chamber coordinates royal military operations and ceremonies, and prepares the royal family for any military activities. The Military Chamber is directed by a commander who must be an active lieutenant-general or a general within the Spanish military, and is under the direct orders of the king. The commander maintains an office with a military legal advisor, an auditor, and section heads for staffing, protocol, operations and logistics. The king is assigned personal aides-de-camp for his assistance, and by extension to his wife the queen and to Princess Sofía. Aides-de-camp are drawn from all of the services, from the Army, from the Navy, from the Air and Space Force, and from the Civil Guard. The Princess of Asturias is entitled to, in future, personal aides-de-camp, drawn from the Army, the Navy, and the Air and Space Force.

The Head of the Household, Secretary General, and Head of the Military Chamber are considered senior management staff and are compensated at the level of senior government administration officials. In 2004, the royal household employed 100 staff members.

The royal household's public relations department manages and maintains an official website on behalf of the royal family known as Casa de S.M. El Rey. The website lists biographical information on members of the immediate royal family, charts their activities, records speeches given at events, and publishes their expected diary of upcoming events, among other information. Additionally, the public relations department publishes the king's diary of his private meetings and the meeting minutes, so long as the other party agrees.

=== Residences and royal sites ===
The king and queen preside over many official functions at the Royal Palace of Madrid in Madrid. However, King Felipe and Queen Letizia and their family reside at the Pavilion, a modest home on the El Pardo estate, near his parents' residence at La Zarzuela. King Juan Carlos and Queen Sofía have spent the majority of their time at the La Zarzuela Palace, a former hunting lodge on the El Pardo estate on the outskirts of Madrid. The El Pardo Palace itself has served as the "guest house" for visiting heads of state since the 1980s.

The Royal Palace of Madrid and the palaces of the El Pardo estate form part of the "Spanish royal sites", a collective term used to denote the set of palaces, monasteries, and convents built under royal patronage throughout its history. The Royal sites are owned by the state and administered by the Patrimonio Nacional (National Heritage) on behalf of the government of the day, and made available for the king as the head of state. Whenever a member of the royal family is not in residence, the royal site is made available for public visitations. The royal household coordinates directly with the National Heritage Council and relevant government ministries or other interests in their planning and staging of state events, with royal sites often providing the setting.

Juan Carlos began a tradition of taking his family on annual holidays to the island of Palma de Mallorca, staying at the Marivent Palace there since the 1960s. Juan Carlos, known as a keen yachtsman, was presented with a yacht by the Balearic Islands and a consortium of local business leaders in 2001 as part of an effort to further associate the royal family with the islands, and to promote the islands as a tourist destination. The yacht, known as the Fortuna, is also owned by the State and administered by the Patrimonio Nacional.

=== Annual budget and taxation ===
Constitutionally the monarch is entitled to compensation from the annual state budget for the maintenance of his family and household administration, and freely distributes these funds in accordance with the laws. According to the Royal Household, "[J]he purpose of these resources is to ensure that the Head of State may carry out his tasks with the independence which is inherent to his constitutional functions, as well as with due effectiveness and dignity". The annual budget pays the remunerations for senior management staff, management staff and career civil servants, other minor staffing positions, and for general office expenses. The Head of Household, Secretary General, and other management staff salaries must be comparable to other administration ministers within the government, though in no way do they form part of the government or administration. As such, the management staff experience increases, decreases, or freezes to their pay in accordance with the fluctuations of government minister salaries. Additionally, the annual budget pays for the maintenance and expenses of senior members of the royal family who undertake royal duties; which includes grocery, clothing, and toiletries allotments. The budget approved by the Cortes for 2010 was just under 7.4 million euros, a budget only slightly larger than that spent on the Luxembourg monarchy. In 2011 the king addressed the perennial critique of the monarchy; that of how the annual budget awarded to the monarchy and royal household is spent. The report revealed that only 9.6% of the 8.4 million euros budgeted that year for the monarchy are paid to royal family members as 'salaries and representative duties', with the difference marked for royal household operational expenses such as household staff salaries, various insurance premiums and liabilities, services, and 'supplementals' such as overhead. In 2012, the monarchy volunteered an additional 25% pay-cut in solidarity with government officials.

Not included in the annual budget is the maintenance and upkeep of Spanish royal sites, which are owned by the state and made available to the king as the head-of-state, but administered by Patrimonio Nacional on behalf of the government of the day. Spanish royal sites are open to the public when members of the royal family are not in residence. Maintenance and upkeep includes groundskeeping, domestic staffing and catering. The budget is administered with professional Public Administration accounting procedures, and is audited by government auditors. All members of the royal family are subject to taxation and annually submit Income Tax and Wealth Tax returns and effect the relevant payments.

== See also ==
- List of Spanish monarchs
- List of Spanish consorts
- Line of succession to the Spanish throne
- 45th Wing
- Carlism
- Republicanism in Spain
- Contemporary history of Spain
