= Irene Urdangarin y Borbón, Grandee of Spain =

Grandee of Spain (born 2005)

Irene Urdangarin y Borbón
- Grandee of Spain
- Born: 5 June 2005 (age 21); Barcelona, Spain
- House: Bourbon-Anjou
- Father: Iñaki Urdangarin
- Mother: Infanta Cristina of Spain

Irene de Todos los Santos Urdangarin y de Borbón (born 5 June 2005) is a member of the Spanish royal family. Irene is the fourth child and only daughter of Infanta Cristina, and her former husband Iñaki Urdangarin. As a granddaughter of King Juan Carlos I, she is tenth in the line of succession to the Spanish throne.

She continued her studies in England. She studied Hospitality, Event Management and Tourism at Oxford Brookes University. She is in a relationship with Juan Urquijo, a grandson of Princess Teresa, Duchess of Salerno.

== Titles and styles ==
As the daughter of an infanta, she holds the title of Grandee of Spain and is styled as Her Excellency.
