= Infanta Cristina of Spain =

Spanish infanta (born 1965)

Cristina
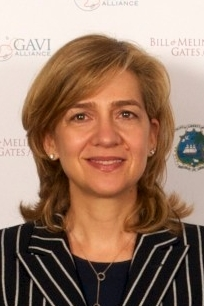
- Cristina in 2011
- Born: 13 June 1965 (age 61); Our Lady of Loreto Sanatorium, Madrid, Spain
- Spouse: Iñaki Urdangarin (m. 1997; div. 2023)
- Issue: Juan Urdangarin y Borbón; Pablo Urdangarin y Borbón; Miguel Urdangarin y Borbón; Irene Urdangarin y Borbón
Names
- Cristina Federica Victoria Antonia de la Santísima Trinidad de Borbón y de Grecia
- House: Bourbon-Anjou
- Father: Juan Carlos I of Spain
- Mother: Sophia of Greece and Denmark

Infanta Cristina (Cristina Federica Victoria Antonia de la Santísima Trinidad de Borbón y de Grecia, born 13 June 1965) is the younger daughter of King Juan Carlos I and his wife, Queen Sofía. She is sixth in the line of succession to the Spanish throne, after her brother King Felipe VI's children, her sister Infanta Elena, Duchess of Lugo, and Elena's children Felipe and Victoria.

On 26 September 1997, on the occasion of her marriage to handball player Iñaki Urdangarin, she was created Duchess of Palma de Mallorca by her father, King Juan Carlos. From 2013 to 2017, she was investigated for possible corruption involving a company she jointly owned with her husband. In 2015, her brother stripped her of her royal dukedom. In 2017, she was acquitted of all charges.

Cristina represented the Crown during the reign of her father. Since October 2011, she has remained apart from the royal family and any official act of the Crown.

== Early life ==
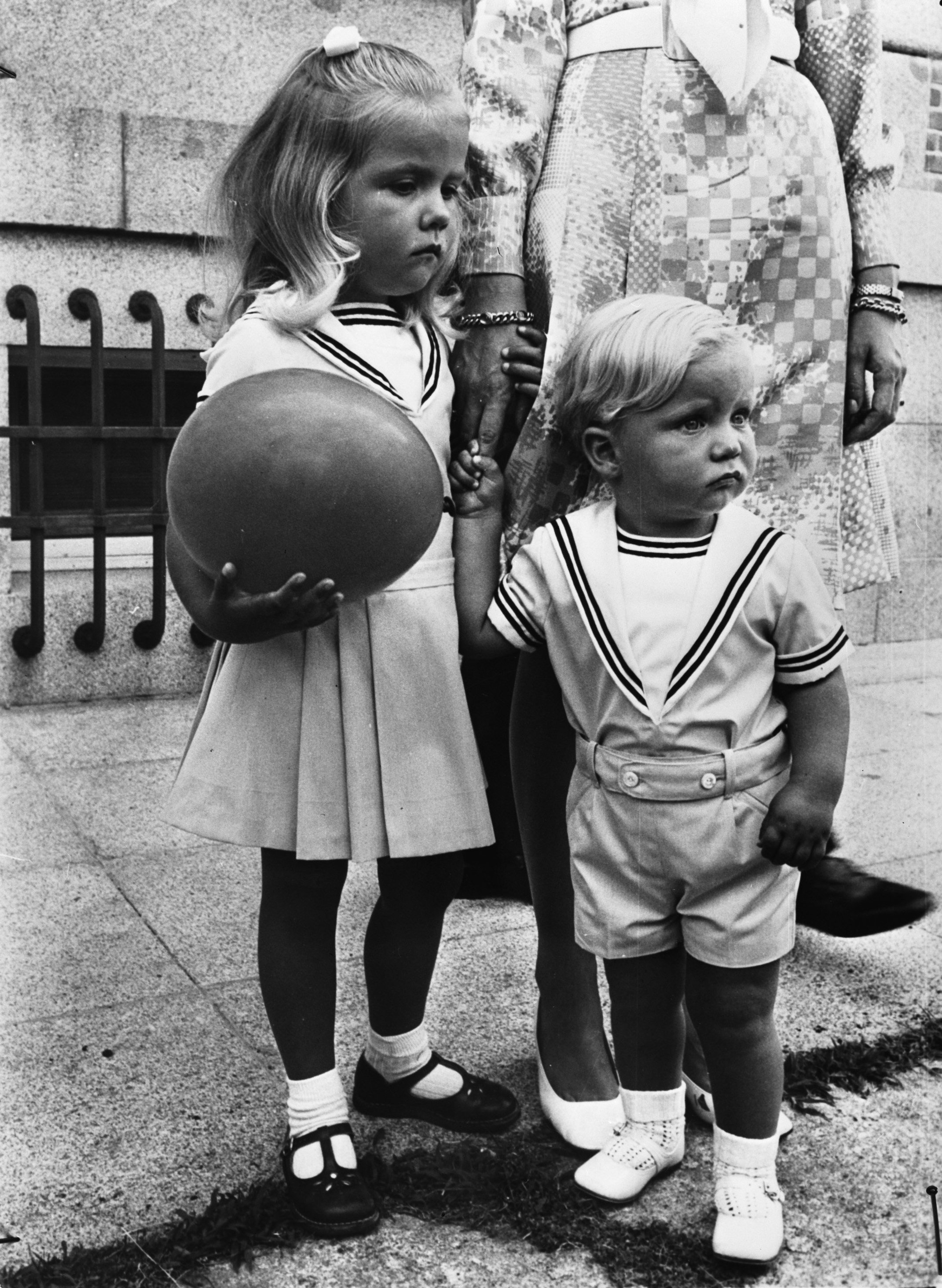
Infanta Cristina with her younger brother, Felipe, in 1969.

Cristina de Borbón was born on 13 June 1965 at Our Lady of Loreto Sanatorium, now known as ORPEA Madrid Loreto in Madrid and was baptized into the Church at the Palacio de La Zarzuela by the Archbishop of Madrid. Her godparents were Alfonso, Duke of Anjou and Cádiz (her first cousin once removed), and Infanta Maria Cristina (great-aunt).

She is a sailor, and competed in the Tornado event at the 1988 Summer Olympics.

She received her secondary education at Santa María del Camino School before graduating from the Universidad Complutense de Madrid in 1989 with a degree in political science. She pursued postgraduate studies at New York University, obtaining an MA in international relations in 1990. In 1991, she gained practical experience working at the UNESCO headquarters in Paris. In 2001, she was named United Nations goodwill ambassador for the 2nd World Assembly on Aging.

She speaks Spanish, Catalan, English, French, and Greek.

== Marriage and children ==
Cristina married team handball player Iñaki Urdangarin at Barcelona Cathedral on 4 October 1997. On this occasion, she was created Duchess of Palma de Mallorca for life. The couple has four children, all born at Teknon Medical Centre in Barcelona:

- Juan Valentín Urdangarin y Borbón, Grandee of Spain (born 29 September 1999),
- Pablo Nicolás Sebastián Urdangarin y de Borbón, Grandee of Spain (born 6 December 2000),
- Miguel Urdangarin y Borbón, Grandee of Spain (born 30 April 2002),
- Irene Urdangarin y Borbón, Grandee of Spain (born 5 June 2005).

They lived in Washington, D.C. from 2009 to 2012, where her husband worked for Telefónica. In August 2013, she moved with her four children to Geneva, Switzerland, to take a job with the Caixa Foundation, while her husband, who was the subject of an embezzlement investigation, remained in Barcelona.

On 24 January 2022, Cristina and Urdangarin announced their separation. The couple divorced in December 2023.

== Activities and personal work ==
Cristina started to attend official events at a very young age. One of the first official events she attended was the proclamation of her father in November 1975. Since finishing her most basic education in 1983, Cristina, along with her sister Elena, supported their parents representing the Crown at official events such as the National Day, the wedding of Princess Astrid of Belgium, the re-burial of Queen Victoria Eugenia at El Escorial, and the state visit of Mexican president Miguel de la Madrid to Spain, among others.

After the corruption scandal of her husband, the Duchess and her husband distanced themselves from the royal family, their last official event was on 12 October 2011. After the ascension of her brother in June 2014, she formally left the royal family.

Regarding her personal work, Cristina has been working for La Caixa Foundation since October 1993. At the same time, she works for the Aga Khan Foundation. She visits Barcelona often for work, but she has lived in Geneva, Switzerland since 2013.

Since 2024, although she has maintained her residence in Geneva, she spends long periods at the Royal Palace of Zarzuela, where her younger children live with their grandmother.

== Corruption inquiry ==
Her husband was investigated from early 2012 on suspicion of fraudulently obtaining millions in public funds in the Nóos affair. In April 2013, Infanta Cristina was formally named as a suspect in the case by the judge in charge. When invited to comment, a Royal Household spokesman said that the Casa Real "does not comment on judicial decisions", yet the next day, after the anti-corruption prosecutor announced that he would appeal the decision, it relented by expressing "absolute conformity" with the legal authorities. In light of the forthcoming trial, she and her children moved to Geneva, Switzerland, in summer 2013. On 7 January 2014, a Spanish judge charged her with tax fraud and money laundering and ordered her to appear in court. The infanta made her first appearance in the Majorca Court on 8 February 2014, where she denied any knowledge of her husband's dealings.

Spanish judge Jose Castro formalised charges against Infanta Cristina on 25 June 2014. In November 2014 the High Court of Palma de Mallorca upheld tax fraud charges against the princess, paving the way for her to face trial; however, it decided to drop money-laundering charges. Her lawyers maintained that they remained completely convinced of her innocence. On 22 December 2014 the High Court of the Balearic Islands announced that Infanta Cristina, her husband, and 15 others would stand trial on tax fraud charges "as soon as next year".

On 12 June 2015, King Felipe VI officially deprived his sister of her dukedom, privately announcing his intention beforehand. After this decision was made public, Cristina's lawyer, Miquel Roca, declared that the king's decision followed a formal request from the infanta, although the Royal Household denied it, saying that her renunciation to the title was after the king's private phone call to communicate her the decision. Her right of succession to the throne, and to the royal title of infanta were unaffected.

Cristina's trial began on 11 January 2016, presided over by three judges in Palma de Mallorca. The charges were filed by the 'Clean Hands' anti-graft organisation using a Spanish legal instrument known as the 'people's accusation'. At that time, her lawyers had asked judges to drop the criminal charges against her, and the state prosecutor said there was insufficient evidence to back up the accusations, but on 29 January the Court in Palma de Mallorca, where the trial was being held, said in a statement it was upholding the charges. She took the stand in March 2016, denying being an accessory to tax evasion, and denying knowledge of her husband's activities. She insisted on her right to answer only questions from her own lawyer. She said that her husband handled the couple's finances, and that she did not know why some large personal expenses were charged to a credit card of a company that the couple owned. She said that she never spoke with her husband about these matters because she was not interested in the subject, and that she was very busy with her small children.

On 17 February 2017, she was acquitted of the charges, while her husband received a sentence of imprisonment for a term of six years and three months.

== Titles, styles, honours and arms ==
=== Titles and styles ===
As a child of a Spanish monarch, Cristina is entitled to the designation and rank of infanta (princess) with the style of Royal Highness. On the occasion of her marriage in 1997, she was created Duchess of Palma de Mallorca. She lost the dukedom in 2015 following her husband's alleged involvement in a corruption scandal.

- 13 June 1965 – 4 October 1997: Her Royal Highness Infanta Doña Cristina
- 4 October 1997 – 11 June 2015: Her Royal Highness Infanta Doña Cristina, Duchess of Palma de Mallorca
- 11 June 2015 – present: Her Royal Highness Infanta Doña Cristina

=== Honours ===
==== National honours ====
- Spain: Dame Grand Cross of the Royal and Distinguished Spanish Order of Charles III
- Spain: Dame Grand Cross of the Royal Order of Isabella the Catholic
- Spain: Golden Medal of the Balearic Islands.
- Spain: Golden Medal of the City of Elche.

==== Foreign honours ====
- Austria: Grand Star of the Decoration of Honour for Services to the Republic of Austria
- Belgium: Grand Cordon of the Order of Leopold
- Ecuador: Grand Cross of the National Order of Merit
- Egypt: Member Supreme Class of the Order of the Virtues
- El Salvador: Grand Cross with Silver Star of the Order of José Matías Delgado
- Germany: Grand Cross 1st class of the Order of Merit of the Federal Republic of Germany
- Greece: Grand Cross of the Order of Honour
- Guatemala: Grand Cross of the Order of the Quetzal
- Iceland: Grand Cross of the Order of the Falcon
- Japan: Grand Cordon (Paulownia) of the Order of the Precious Crown
- Jordan: Grand Cordon of the Order of the Star of Jordan
- Luxembourg: Grand Cross of the Order of Adolphe of Nassau
- Mexico: Grand Cross of the Order of the Aztec Eagle
- (Kingdom of Nepal) Nepalese Royal Family: Member First Class of the Most Illustrious Order of the Three Divine Powers
- Netherlands: Knight Grand Cross of the Order of Orange-Nassau
- Norway: Grand Cross of the Order of St. Olav
- Peru: Grand Cross of the Order of the Sun
- Portugal: Grand Cross of the Order of Christ
- Portugal: Grand Cross of the Order of Prince Henry
- Sweden: Recipient of the 50th Birthday Badge Medal of King Carl XVI Gustaf
- Thailand: Knight Grand Cross of the Order of the White Elephant

== See also ==
- Line of succession to the Spanish throne

Infanta Cristina of Spain House of Bourbon Cadet branch of the Capetian dynasty Born: 13 June 1965
Lines of succession
| Preceded by Victoria Federica de Marichalar | Line of succession to the Spanish Throne; 6th in line | Succeeded by Juan Valentín Urdangarín |
Olympic Games
| Preceded by Alejandro Abascal | Flagbearer for Spain; Seoul 1988 | Succeeded by Felipe, Prince of Asturias |
