= Nóos affair =

Ongoing case of alleged political corruption in Spain

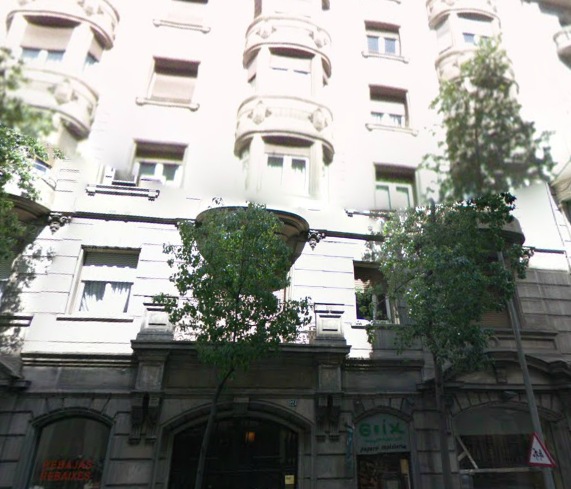
No. 224 Balmes Street in Barcelona, on the fourth floor of which were located Aizoon and Baf Tejeiro's social headquarters, the tax-advice office of Diego Torres' siblings-in-law

The Nóos case, also known as the Babel operation, is an ongoing case of alleged political corruption in Spain which started in 2010, derived from the Palma Arena case. The leaders of the nonprofit foundation Nóos Institute, Iñaki Urdangarin, then Duke of Palma de Mallorca, and his business partner Diego Torres have been accused of using Nóos and a corporate network of companies to embezzle about 6 million euros ($6.6 million) in public funds for sporting events, perverting the course of justice, falsification and money laundering.

== The accused ==
In December 2011, the judge attendant of the Palma Arena case, José Castro, charged nine individuals. In 2013, after one of the accused, Diego Torres, had confessed, the list increased to 10. As of 2016 the list had grown to 18. The main defendants have been:

- Iñaki Urdangarín Liebaert (born on 15 January 1968), former handball player and husband of the infanta of Spain, Cristina de Borbón, daughter of King Juan Carlos I. He has been facing charges since 2012 for using his former title of Duke of Palma to embezzle about 6 million euros ($6.6 million) in public funds for sporting events. On 17 February 2017, Urdangarin was given a six-year-and-three-month prison sentence for his role in the case. In appeal the Supreme Court changed this on 12 June 2018 into a term of five years and ten months.
- Diego Torres
- Cristina de Borbón y Grecia, Infanta of Spain (born on 13 June 1965), then Duchess of Palma, daughter of King Juan Carlos I of Spain. Charged since April 2013. with two counts of tax fraud, facing a possible eight-year sentence. She was acquitted of the charges in February 2017.
- José Luis Ballester Tuliesa, "Pepote" Ballester (born in 1968), former Olympic sailor, managing director of Sports of the Government of the Balearic Islands.
- Carlos García Revenga (born in 1955), private secretary of the infantas and member of the patronate of the Queen Sofía Foundation. Licensed in Pedagogics, and Schoolteachers, former teacher of the Santa María del Camino college (Puerto del Hierro, Madrid). Charged since February 2013.
- Jaume Matas i Palou (Palma de Mallorca, 1956), former Balearic president, one of the first defendants. Under his term the regional executive ordered the Nóos Institute to organize two forums about tourism and sport from which Urdangarín's company supposedly pocketed €2.3 million between 2005 and 2006.
- Miguel Zorío, owner of the company Communication Lobby and collaborator of Urdangarín and Torres as from 2004, when he managed the Valencia Summit, a sports summit that Nóos organized for the Valencian government.

== Timeline ==
In February 2006, Antoni Dieguez, a Socialist representative in the Balearic Parliament, said that the Government chaired by Jaume Matas had paid 1.2 million euros to the Nóos Institute for a 3-day forum on tourism and sport from 22 until 25 November 2005, with minimal impact.

In the summer of 2007 the Palma Arena case began, when an imbalance of more than 50 million euros in the accounts of the newly opened sports center Palma Arena became public as it had cost 110 million with a bidding price of 43 million.

In 2010, the Nóos case was opened as derived from the Palma Arena case. in the Palma Arena records police found two collaboration agreements between the Balearic Government and the Nóos Institute. The magistrate Jose Castro found sufficient cause to open a separate case, misappropriation of public funds, embezzlement of public funds and fraudulent administration.
