= Iñaki Urdangarin =

Spanish handball player (born 1968)

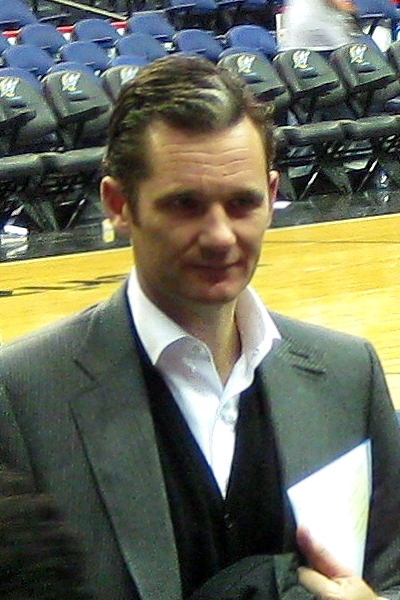
- Urdangarin in 2010

Personal information
- Nationality: Spanish
- Born: Iñaki Urdangarin Liebaert; 15 January 1968 (age 58) Zumárraga, Basque, Spain
- Spouse: Infanta Cristina of Spain (m. 1997; div. 2023)
- Children: 4
- Parents: Juan María Urdangarin Berriochoa; Claire Françoise Liebaert Courtain

Sport
- Sport: Handball
Medal record
Men's handball
Bronze medal – third place	1996 Atlanta	Team competition
Bronze medal – third place	2000 Sydney	Team competition

Iñaki Urdangarin Liebaert (born 15 January 1968) is a retired Spanish handball player turned entrepreneur and the former husband of Infanta Cristina, younger daughter of King Juan Carlos and Queen Sofía. He was the brother-in-law of King Felipe VI. Urdangarin was convicted in the Nóos affair for embezzling about 6 million euros in public funds for sporting events through his nonprofit foundation beginning in 2004, and for political corruption by misusing his former courtesy title of consort Duke of Palma de Mallorca as the husband of Infanta Cristina. In June 2018 he was sentenced to 5 years and 10 months in prison; he was initially imprisoned in Ávila, but as of 2021 he was on supervised release.

== Early life and education ==
Iñaki Urdangarin was born on 15 January 1968 in the town of Zumárraga, in Gipuzkoa province, within the autonomous community of Basque country in northern Spain. Urdangarin's father, Juan María Urdangarin Berriochoa, also born in Zumarraga, was an engineer and businessman in the chemical and the banking industries. Urdangarin's mother, Claire Françoise Liebaert Courtain, was born in Antwerp, Belgium and is of Spanish Basque and Belgian (both Walloon and Flemish) descent.

He has six siblings. His paternal grandparents Laureano de Urdangarin y Larrañaga (1898–1982) and wife Ana de Berriochoa y Elgarresta (1902–1996) came from the tiny and humble Basque village of Zumarraga.

He obtained an MBA after a "tailor made study".

== Sports career ==
At the age of 18, Urdangarin became a professional handball player with FC Barcelona Handbol, where he remained until his retirement in 2000. Meanwhile, he studied at the Escuela Superior de Administración y Dirección de Empresas (ESADE) in Barcelona, from which he received a master's degree in business administration.

As a member of the Spanish handball team, he participated in the 1992, 1996, and 2000 Summer Olympics, serving as team captain in 2000. The team won the bronze medal in 1996 and 2000.

Urdangarin has been a member of the Spanish Olympic Committee since 4 April 2001, and was elected first deputy chairman on 16 February 2004. In 2001, he received the Grand Cross of the Royal Order of Sports Merit.

In September 2001, it was reported that Urdangarin had been appointed director of planning and development at Octagon Esedos, a company dedicated to sports marketing. At the same time, he retired from professional handball.

== Corruption and money laundering ==
In November 2011, Urdangarin was accused of diverting public funds for his own profit through the non-profit Nóos institute in the 'Palma Arena' case. The Spanish Anticorruption bureau conducted searches at the Nóos institute. The daily El País published a budget document for an international event organized by the Noos Institute. It is believed that he persuaded various Spanish public administrations (mostly regional governments) to sign agreements with the Nóos Institute for both work that was never done and work that was dramatically overstated, amounting to up to €5,800,000 of funding from public administrations.

In December 2011, the Anticorruption Bureau confirmed that Urdangarin had been sending substantial sums of public money to accounts in Belize and the United Kingdom. That same month, the Royal Household of Spain announced that Urdangarin would not participate in any official royal family activity for the foreseeable future, as a result of the scandal. In his 2011 Christmas Eve National Speech, King Juan Carlos stated that "La justicia es igual para todos" ("Justice is the same for everyone"); the following day he clarified that he was speaking generally.

On 6 February 2012, Urdangarin appeared before a judge regarding allegations of corruption. He was investigated with 14 others, including Jaume Matas, former premier of the Balearics. He appeared again on 25 February 2012 in Mallorca to answer questions before the investigating judge, José Castro.

On 26 January 2013, the Spanish royal household removed from its official website the section covering Iñaki Urdangarin.

On 10 June 2016 Prosecutor Pedro Horrach called for Urdangarin to be jailed for 19 1/2 years and to be fined 980,000 euros. He was sentenced to six years and three months of jail and a fine of €512,000 on 17 February 2017. On 12 June 2018, the Supreme Court of Spain in appeal sentenced Urdangarin to five years and ten months imprisonment. On 18 June 2018, he reported to the prison of Brieva in Ávila. In 2021, he was put on supervised release, needing to visit prison only once a week.

== Personal life ==
According to the Royal Household, Urdangarin met the Infanta Cristina, Duchess of Palma de Mallorca at the 1996 Olympic Games in Atlanta. However Consuelo León Llorente and María Molina maintain in their book, Infanta Cristina, that they met in 1992. They married in Barcelona on 4 October 1997. The couple have four children, all born at Teknon Medical Centre in Barcelona: Juan (born 29 September 1999); Pablo (born 6 December 2000); Miguel (born 30 April 2002); and Irene (born 5 June 2005). As is social custom in Spain, Urdangarin had often been accorded the male form of his wife's title with the courtesy title of Duke of Palma de Mallorca since his marriage. (Note: In view of contradictory Spanish legislation, enacted over the past 30 years, Urdangarin was not legally entitled to use the ducal title of his wife (Royal Decree 1368/1987, Transitory Provisions, Third).) Cristina would lose this title in 2015.

The family lived in Barcelona from 1997 until 2009, where Urdangarin was director of planning and development for Motorpress Ibérica and a founding partner of Nóos Consultoría Estratégica. From 2009 to 2011, they lived in Washington, D.C., where he worked for Telefónica. In August 2013, Urdangarin remained in Barcelona to stand trial, while his wife and children moved to Geneva, Switzerland, to work with the Caixabank Foundation. On 24 January 2022, Cristina and Urdangarin announced their separation. The couple divorced in December 2023.

== Titles, styles, honours and arms ==
=== Titles ===
- 15 January 1968 – 4 October 1997: Iñaki Urdangarin Liebaert
- 4 October 1997 – 12 June 2015: The Most Excellent The Duke of Palma de Mallorca
- 12 June 2015 – present: The Most Excellent Iñaki Urdangarin Liebaert

In view of contradictory Spanish legislation, enacted over the past 30 years, Urdangarin was not entitled to use the ducal title of his wife (Royal Decree 1368/1987, Transitory Provisions, Third). But by centuries-old social convention in Spain, he was considered a duke. However, Iñaki Urdangarin retained the style of The Most Excellent since, although he ceased to be the consort of a duchess, he is still a Knight Grand Cross of the Royal Order of Sports Merit.

== Honours ==
=== National honour ===
- Spain : Knight Grand Cross of the Royal Order of the Sports Merit (Real Orden del Mérito Deportivo, 30 November 2001).

=== Foreign honours ===
- Germany: Grand Cross 1st class of the Order of Merit of the Federal Republic of Germany (11 November 2002).
- Luxembourg : Grand Cross of the Order of the Oak Crown (07/05/2001).
