= Infantry Regiment "Inmemorial del Rey" No. 1 =

Senior regiment of the Spanish Army

- Regimiento de Infantería Inmemorial del Rey no. 1
- Coat of Arms of the King's Own Immemorial 1st Infantry Regiment
- Active: 1248–present (777–778 years)
- Country: Spain
- Branch: Spanish Army
- Type: Grenadiers/Fusiliers
- Role: Honor Battalion – Public Duties; Support Unit – Security/Administration; Service Unit – Engineering Support; Band Unit – Music
- Size: 4 battalions
- Part of: Army Headquarters
- Garrison/HQ: Madrid

Commanders
- Commander in Chief: His Majesty The King

The Infantry Regiment "Inmemorial del Rey" No. 1 (Spanish: Regimiento de Infantería Inmemorial del Rey no. 1) is the senior regiment of the Spanish Army, and is considered the oldest still active military unit in the world.

== History ==
King Ferdinand III of Castille, in 1248, during the conquest of Seville, with some of his men-at-arms, assaulted and took a tower. Seemingly, with such boldness and bravery they gained the admiration of the King. The campaign finished and with the consequent disbandment of troops, King Ferdinand decided to permanently keep that force on the rolls, making one of the first standing armies in Europe since the Roman Empire.

On 28 August 1632, on the initiative of Philip IV, a special corps of troops was ordered to be formed with veteran soldiers, reenlistments and knights of noble ancestry - men so skilled that they only took arms when the monarch assumed command in person, designating it "King's Guard Colonelship." Its organization commenced in Almansa in 1634, its force fixed as a three battalion force organized as fifteen companies with 90 harquebusiers, 40 musketeers, and 60 corslets and pikemen in the company, plus officers assigned. The battalions were fixed into 5 companies each with headquarters elements smaller than the regiment's. Later, in 1638, 5 more companies were added, increasing the total to 20 and gaining a 4th battalion in the process. Its first colonel, Count Duke of Olivares, Don Gaspar de Guzmán, whose post was the recently created "King's Guard Colonelship," was in command of very distinguished soldiers of great renown. In 1640, Philip IV elevated it to the category of King's Guard Regiment and in 1664 to Castile Tercio. From 1701 to 1710 it was dedicated to its ancient mission, guarding the Monarch, and it was in 1707 when it received the designation Castile, and in 1710 that of Castile Immemorial Infantry Regiment. It gained glory in the Spanish War of Succession and the Italian Campaigns (1718-1749), eventually it received the name King's Infantry Regiment on 7 January 1766.

That same year, King Charles III, persuaded by the antiquity of the regiment, declared it the King's Immemorial Regiment on account of its loyalty to the Crown.

After several historical changes in its name, the regiment was reassigned in the 1940s to Army Headquarters at the Buenavista Palace where it remains to this day. The regiment received its present designation in 1995.

== Connections with royal family ==
Traditionally, as the regiment is linked to the Spanish royal family and to the sovereign in his/her duty as Captain General and Commander-in-Chief of the Armed Forces, all the Princes of Asturias since 1862 are enrolled as Honorary soldiers in the 1st Company. Following the tradition then Don Felipe de Borbón y Grecia (Prince of Asturias and heir to the Crown) assumed his post as a soldier in 1977.

== Traditional dress uniforms ==
To commemorate Spain's long military tradition, in 1981 King Juan Carlos I accepted the proposal of the Chief of Staff of the Army to establish two companies with historic uniforms and armaments, which could render honors and participate in special ceremonies.

=== 18th century ===
The period chosen was that from 1780 to 1786, at the end of the reign of Charles III. At this date Spanish infantry regiment had two battalions, each one formed of nine companies; one of grenadiers and eight of fusiliers. The first honor guard company wears the white infantry uniform of this period, with green facing and botoneras (metal buttons) on the waistcoat and dress coat. The second company wears a blue uniform with red facings and similar distinctions. These reflect the historic colors of the Spanish Royal Guard. Both companies wear tricornes.

Grenadiers in the modern Infantry Regiment "Inmemorial del Rey" No. 1 are not permitted to wear glasses, but beards have recently been permitted. Historically selection for the grenadier companies of the Spanish infantry was a distinction normally reserved for the bravest and tallest soldiers of a regiment. These picked men marched at the head of the regiment, escorted the colors and were expected to form the vanguard when storming a fortified position. They wore short sabers, a distinction retained in the modern regiment. The high grenadier cap still worn, augmented their stature and the brass insignia on the strap of the cartridge pouch plus the sardinetas (special braiding) worn on their cuffs distinguished these elite companies.

The uniform described is also worn by staff personnel and the marker unit (gastadores). The commander of the honor battalion wears similar uniform but with a tricorne.

=== Early 20th century full dress ===
In addition to the 18th century uniforms previously described, the Infantry Regiment "Inmemorial del Rey" No. 1 parades detachments of up to company strength, plus the regimental band, in the full dress uniform of the Spanish line infantry, as worn during the reign of King Alfonso XIII (1902-1931). This consists of the distinctive "ros" (shako) with black hackle, dark blue tunics with red facings and red trousers. A sabre is worn by officers.

== Current functions ==
At present the regiment is the unit responsible for providing the central seat of army headquarters' security, services, and support needed for its functioning, and it also helps give security to whatever the authorities task it with. These functions support the central objective of facilitating the operation of the different centers and departments that make up headquarters, to which end it performs following tasks:

- Giving security to the people as well as to the installations of headquarters.
- Organising and directing services necessary to guarantee the optimal functioning of material resources in the service of Buenavista Palace, and the supply of the centers into which it is integrated. In this way also it also guarantees, through its transport assets, the mobility of the authorities and the board of headquarters.
- Rendering prescribed honors within the garrison of Madrid and as an exception in other garrisons. This function, perhaps the best known by the public in general, gives pomp and colour to various social functions. This function entails, in broad outline, the reception of heads of state and other civil and military authorities and the participation in cultural, social and religious functions of great relevance in Madrid and elsewhere.

== Organisation and insignia ==
In order to execute the above functions, the regiment is organized into the following units, plus command staff:

"Old Guard of Castille" Honor Guard Battalion, charged with guard of honor duties and other ceremonial and public duties, with two companies of infantry, a section of artillery with six 105/14 howitzers, and a corps of drums wearing uniforms and playing period instruments of the 1780s alongside modern day plain bugles.

Automobile unit with 274 vehicles.

HQ Support unit with two companies: the Compania de Plana (Blue company) of Staff and support where army personnel who execute functions of administrative support to the centers and institutions of army headquarters are assigned, and the Compania de Servicios (Green company) which provides services for the proper functioning of the infrastructure, as well as for the well-being of personnel posted at army headquarters.

The regimental band is composed of 65 members. It is well known throughout Spain for the quality of its concerts. The band wears the blue and red infantry regulation full dress uniform adopted in 1908. It is one of the oldest musical units in the Spanish Army. The regiment's band is integrated into its support unit and is based in the Buenavista Palace. Alongside the regimental band is the Corps of Drums (Banda de Guerra), made up of bugles and drums plus a section of bagpipes and fifes. The band has played extensively in Europe and the Americas and has had numerous recordings made in Spain and France. It has also performed with the National Orchestra of Spain. Along with the Musical Unit of the Spanish Royal Guard, it plays to honor heads of government during state visits to Spain. While the bandsmen are part of the Common Band Corps and graduates of the Central Defense Academy, the separate Corps of Drums consists of serving personnel of the regiment.

== Civilian aid ==
In addition to these regular functions, the regiment has participated in actions on behalf of the civilian population when required, e.g. environmental cleaning carried out in Galicia following the sinking of the ship Prestige.
