= List of state visits received by Felipe VI =

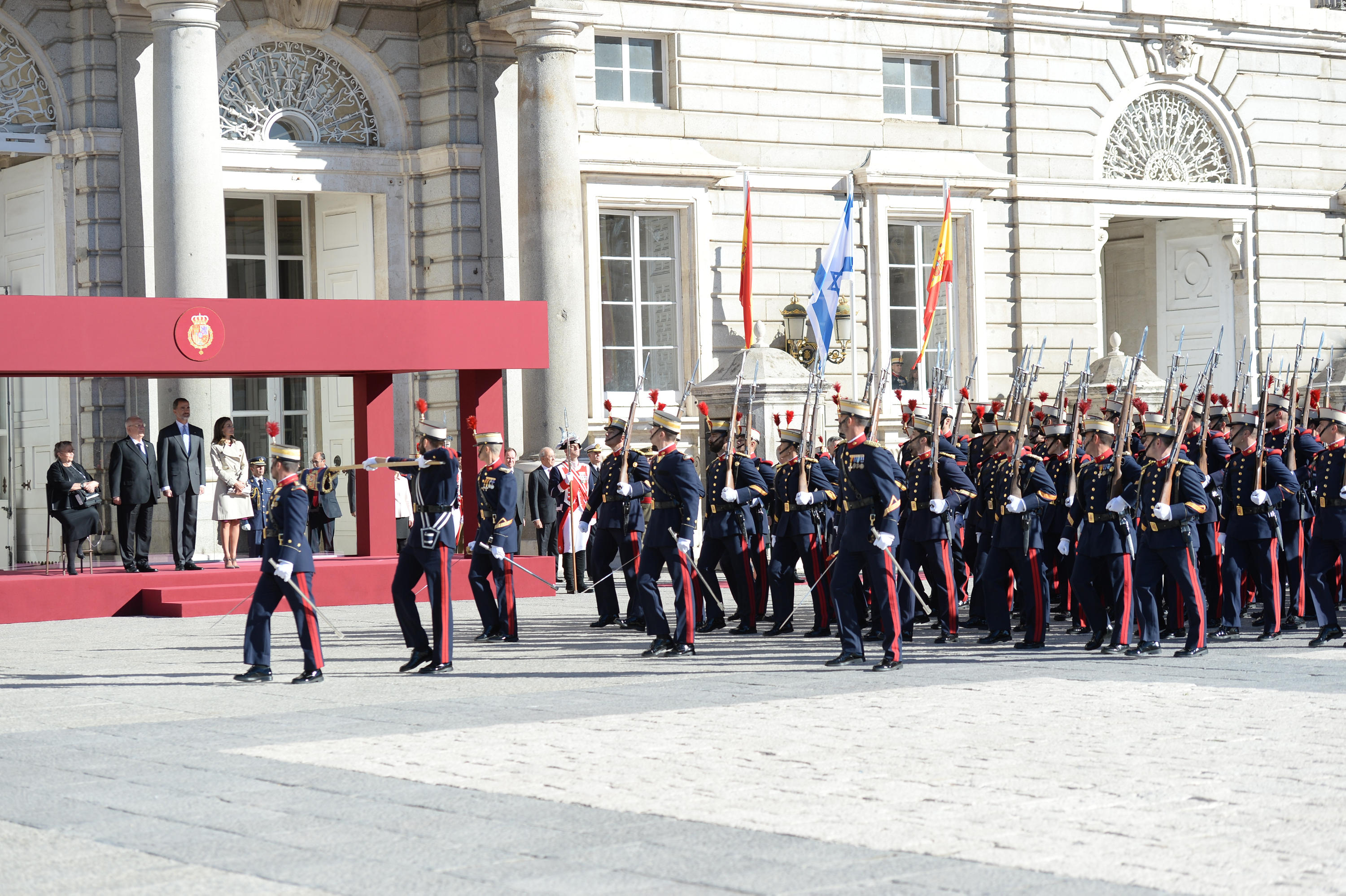
The state visit of Israeli President Reuven Rivlin to Spain, November 2017

Since acceding to the throne of Spain in 2014, King Felipe VI has received a number of state and official visits. He usually hosts one or two visiting heads of state each year.

== List of visits ==
No.	Date	Country	Guests
1	29–30 October 2014	Chile	President Michelle Bachelet
2	1–3 March 2015	Colombia	President Juan Manuel Santos; First Lady Clemencia Rodríguez
3	7–8 July 2015	Peru	President Ollanta Humala; First Lady Nadine Heredia
4	22–23 February 2017	Argentina	President Mauricio Macri; First Lady Juliana Awada
5	6–7 November 2017	Israel	President Reuven Rivlin; First Lady Nechama Rivlin
6	16–18 April 2018	Portugal	President Marcelo Rebelo de Sousa
7	27–29 November 2018	China	President Xi Jinping; First Lady Peng Liyuan
8	27–28 February 2019	Peru	President Martín Vizcarra; First Lady Maribel Díaz Cabello
9	15–17 June 2021	South Korea	President Moon Jae-in; First Lady Kim Jung-sook
10	16–17 November 2021	Italy	President Sergio Mattarella; First Lady Laura Mattarella
11	27–29 April 2022	Bulgaria	President Rumen Radev; First Lady Desislava Radeva
12	17–18 May 2022	Qatar	Emir Tamim bin Hamad Al Thani; Sheikha Jawaher bint Hamad Al Thani
13	3-5 November 2025	Oman	Sultan of Oman Haitham bin Tariq Al Said

== Countries who have made state visits ==
Countries	State Visits
Peru	2
Argentina	1
Chile	1
China	1
Colombia	1
Israel	1
Portugal	1
South Korea	1
Italy	1
Bulgaria	1
Qatar	1

== See also ==
- List of foreign visits made by Felipe VI
