= Felipe VI =

King of Spain since 2014

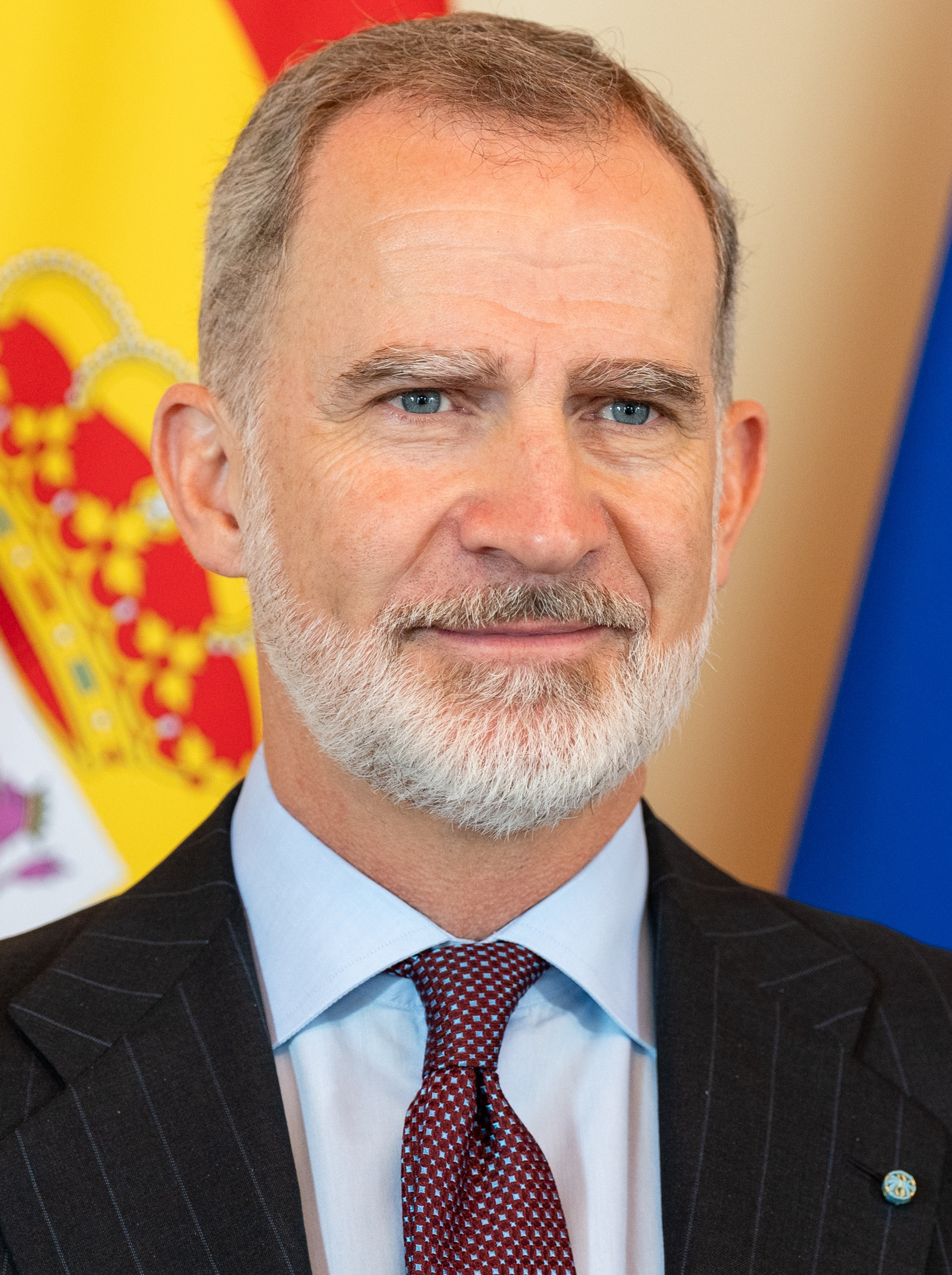
- Felipe in 2024

King of Spain
- Reign: 19 June 2014 – present
- Enthronement: 19 June 2014
- Predecessor: Juan Carlos I
- Heir presumptive: Leonor, Princess of Asturias
- Born: 30 January 1968 (age 58); Madrid, Spain
- Spouse: Letizia Ortiz Rocasolano (m. 2004)
- Issue: Leonor, Princess of Asturias; Infanta Sofía
Names
- Felipe Juan Pablo Alfonso de Todos los Santos de Borbón y Grecia
- House: Bourbon (Note: The English-language version of the Official Royal Family website is rendered as "Borbon", while in Spanish it is rendered as "Borbón". In English, the house is traditionally called House of Bourbon.)
- Father: Juan Carlos I of Spain
- Mother: Sophia of Greece and Denmark
- Military career
- Allegiance: Spain
- Branch: Spanish Armed Forces (Note: Felipe has served in all three branches of the Armed Forces (the Spanish Army, Spanish Air and Space Force and Spanish Navy).)
- Service years: 1986–1999 (Note: End of active service and start of special regimen of honorary service.)
- Rank: See list
- Unit: 1st King's Inmemorial Infantry Regiment

Felipe VI (Spanish pronunciation: [feˈlipe ˈseksto]; (Note: Most English-language media refer to the king as Felipe VI, although a few sources have rendered his name as Philip VI. In the languages of Spain, his name is: Aragonese: Felipe VI, IPA: [fe'lipe sej'seno]; Asturian: Felipe VI, IPA: [fe'lipe 'sestu]; Basque: Felipe VI.a, IPA: [felipe seiɣarena]; Catalan: Felip VI, IPA: [fəˈlip siˈzɛ]; Galician: Filipe VI, IPA: [fiˈlipɪ ˈsɛkstʊ].) Felipe Juan Pablo Alfonso de Todos los Santos de Borbón y Grecia; born 30 January 1968) is King of Spain, reigning since 2014.

Felipe was born in Madrid during the dictatorship of Francisco Franco as the third child and only son of Prince Juan Carlos of Spain and Princess Sophia of Greece and Denmark (later King and Queen of Spain). He was officially proclaimed Prince of Asturias in 1977, two years after his father became king, and was formally sworn in as heir in 1986. At the age of nine, Felipe was made an honorary officer of the Spanish Army. He was educated at Santa María de los Rosales School in Madrid and attended Lakefield College School in Canada. Later, he studied law at the Autonomous University of Madrid and earned a Master of Science in Foreign Service degree from the Walsh School of Foreign Service at Georgetown University in Washington, D.C., United States.

To prepare for his future military role, Felipe joined the Spanish Army in 1985. Over the next two years, he completed military training in the Spanish Navy and Spanish Air Force. After finishing both civil and military studies, he undertook official duties representing his father at various national and international events, including charity foundations, cultural inaugurations, and diplomatic functions. During one such event, he met television journalist Letizia Ortiz Rocasolano, whom he married in 2004. They have two daughters: Leonor and Sofía.

Felipe ascended the throne on 19 June 2014 following the abdication of his father. His reign has been marked by his dissolution of the Spanish Parliament in 2016 (so that new elections could be called), the 2017 Catalan independence referendum and related 2017–2018 Spanish constitutional crisis, the COVID-19 pandemic, and initiatives promoting greater transparency and modernization within the Spanish monarchy. According to a 2020 opinion poll, Felipe has held moderately high approval ratings.

== Early life and family ==
Felipe was born at 12:45 (CET) on 30 January 1968 at Our Lady of Loreto Sanatorium in Madrid, as the third child and only son of Prince Juan Carlos of Spain (later King Juan Carlos I) and Princess Sophia of Greece and Denmark (later Queen Sofía of Spain).

He was baptised on 8 February 1968 at the Palace of Zarzuela by the Roman Catholic Archbishop of Madrid, Casimiro Morcillo, with water from the Jordan River. His full baptismal name, Felipe Juan Pablo Alfonso de Todos los Santos, was given in honor of significant relatives and ancestors: the first Bourbon king of Spain, Felipe V; his grandfathers, Infante Juan, Count of Barcelona and King Paul of Greece; his great-grandfather, Alfonso XIII of Spain; and the customary Bourbons addition de Todos los Santos ("of all the Saints"). His godparents were his paternal grandfather, the Count of Barcelona, and his paternal great-grandmother, Queen Victoria Eugenie.

Shortly after his birth, Felipe was styled infante. The dictator Francisco Franco died just over two months before Felipe's eighth birthday, after which Felipe's father ascended the throne, having been appointed Prince of Spain in 1969. Felipe made his first official appearance at his father's proclamation as king on 22 November 1975.

== Prince of Asturias ==
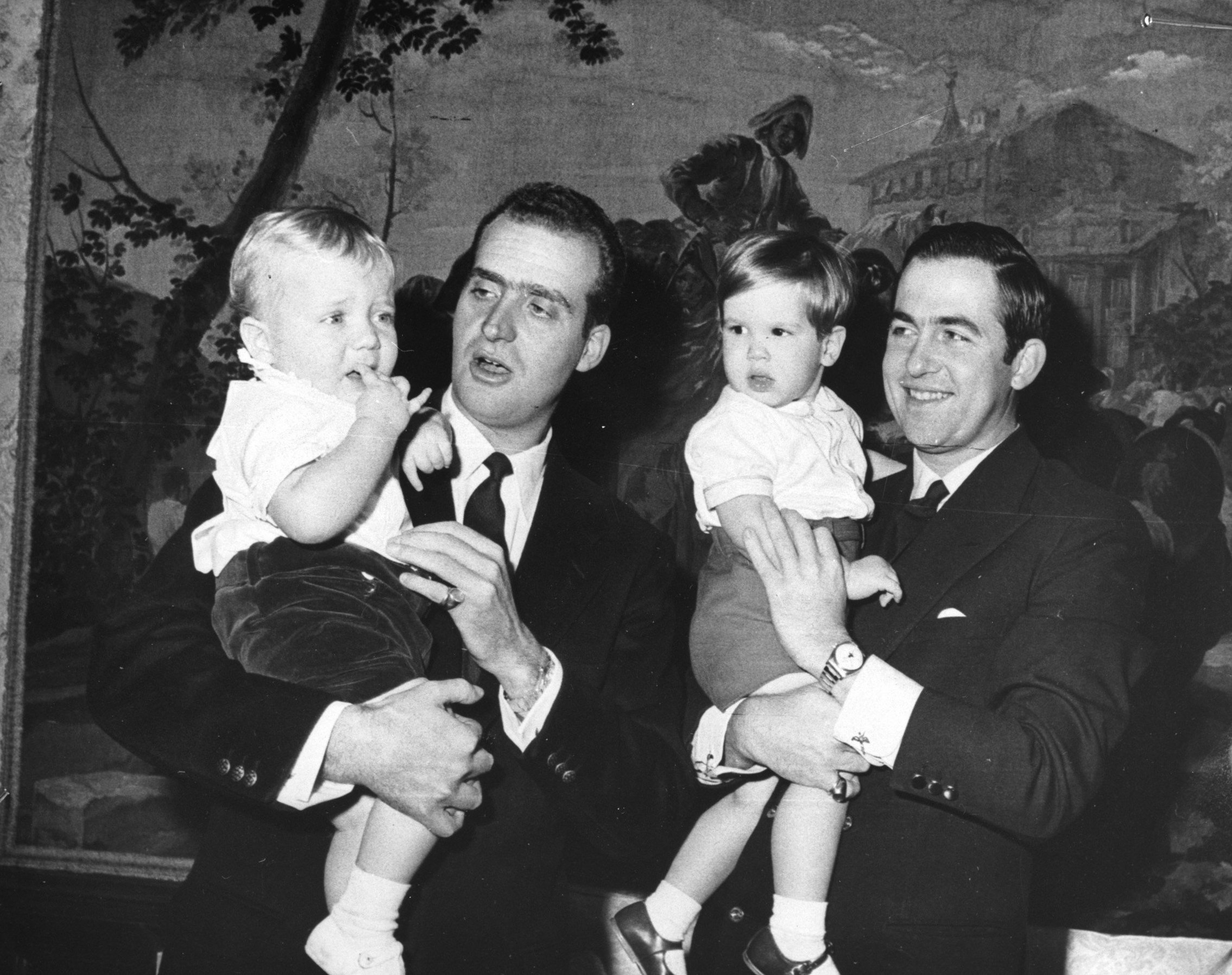
Juan Carlos, Prince of Spain (left), with his son Felipe and his brother-in-law Constantine II of Greece (right) with his son Pavlos, 1968

In 1977, Felipe was formally proclaimed Prince of Asturias. (Note: In addition, he was also allowed to use "other titles and designations traditionally used by the heir to the throne" (i.e. Prince of Girona and Prince of Viana).) In May, nine-year-old Felipe was made an honorary soldier of the 1st King's Inmemorial Infantry Regiment. The occasion was marked on 28 May and was attended by the king, the prime minister and several other ministers in a ceremony at the infantry's barracks. On 1 November the same year, he was ceremonially paid homage as Prince of Asturias in Covadonga. In 1981 Felipe received the Collar of the Order of the Golden Fleece from his father, the Chief and Sovereign of the Order. On his 18th birthday on 30 January 1986, Felipe swore allegiance to the Constitution and to the King in the Spanish Parliament as required by the constitution, fully accepting his role as successor to the Crown.

In 1999, the construction began on a new royal residence near the Zarzuela Palace. This residence, known as the Prince's Pavilion (Spanish: Pabellón del Principe), became Felipe's private residence in the summer of 2002 and cost 4.23 million euros.

=== Education and military training ===
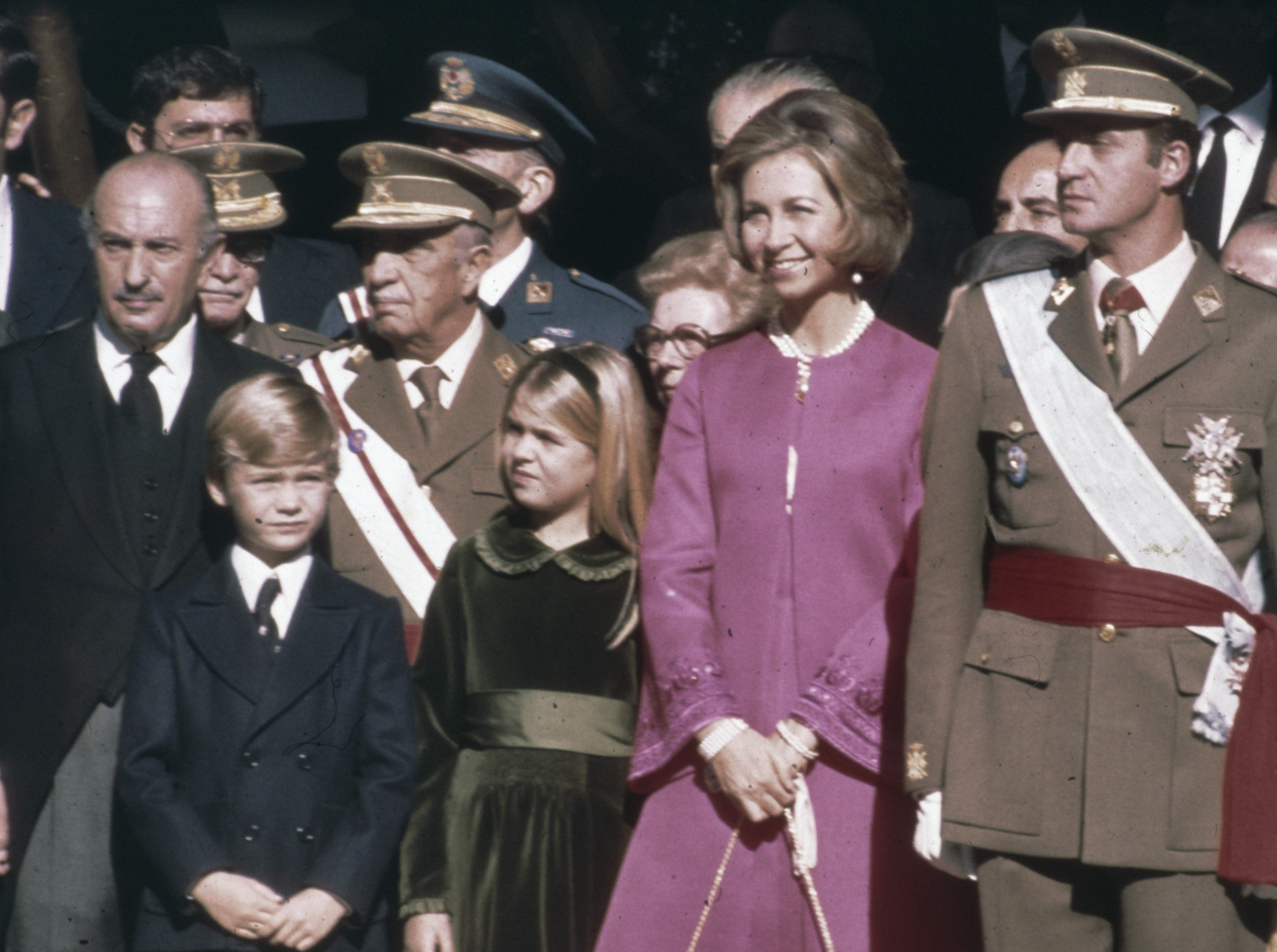
In 1975, next to his parents, his older sister Cristina, and Alejandro Rodríguez de Valcárcel

From 1972 to 1984, Felipe attended school at Santa María de los Rosales, which his daughters both attended. Felipe attended high school at Lakefield College School in Ontario, Canada in September of that year, and studied at the Autonomous University of Madrid, where he graduated with a degree in law; he also completed several courses in economics. He completed his academic studies by obtaining a Master of Science in Foreign Service degree from the School of Foreign Service at Georgetown University in Washington, D.C., where he was the roommate of his cousin, Crown Prince Pavlos of Greece.

As the heir to the throne, a carefully regulated and structured plan was laid out for Felipe's military training. In August 1985, a Royal Decree named Felipe as officer at the General Military Academy in Zaragoza. He began his military training there in September. He completed the first phase of his formation in October. In July 1986, he was promoted to Cadet Ensign. He was also named as Midshipman. In September 1986, he began his naval training at the Naval Military Academy in Marin (Pontevedra), joining the Third Brigade. In January 1987, he continued his naval training on board the training ship Juan Sebastián Elcano.

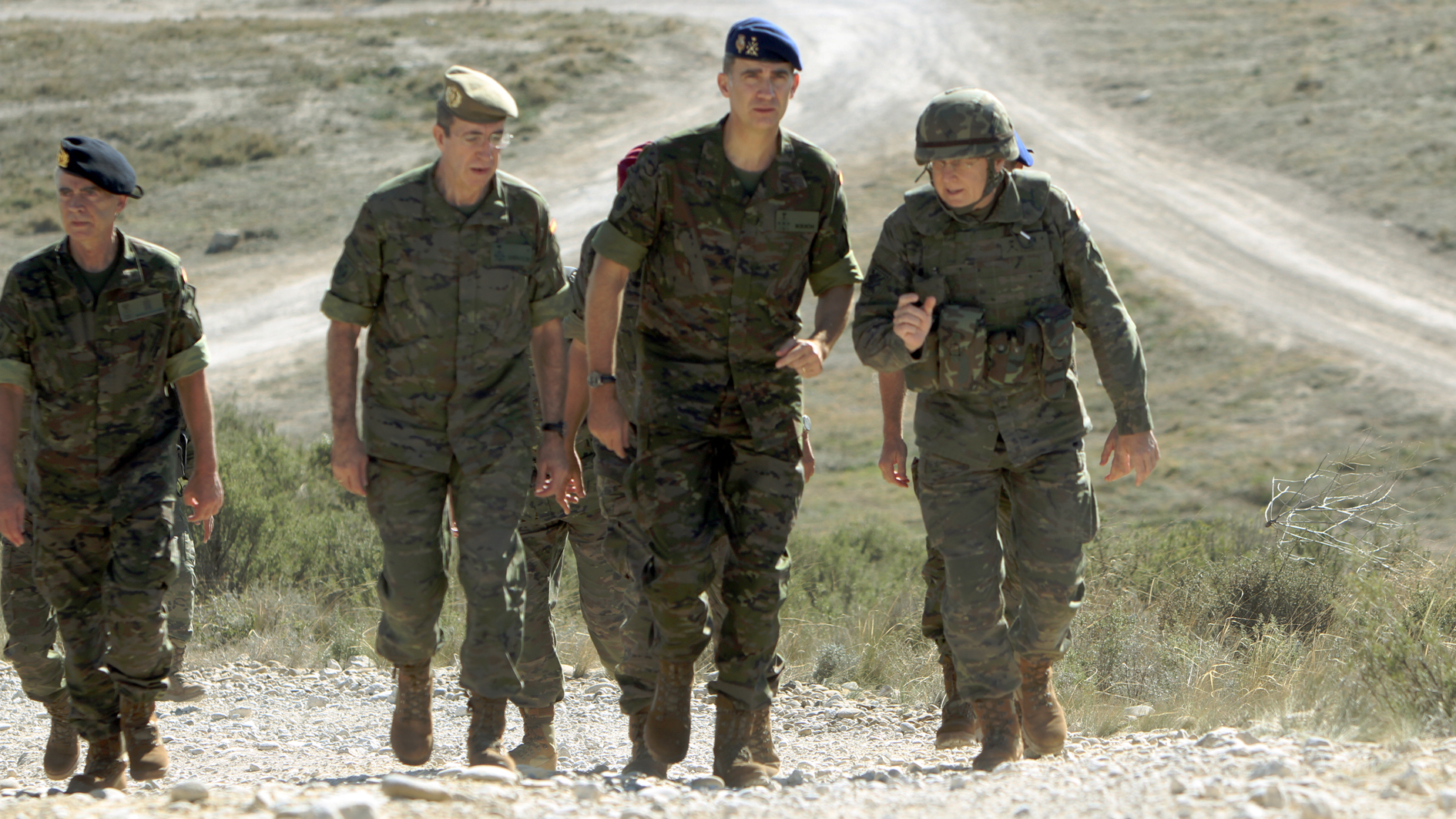
King Felipe VI in 2015 with the JEMAD Admiral Fernando García Sánchez, JEME General Jaime Domínguez Buj and the Commander of the 7th Reconnaissance Cavalry Group of the VII Light Infantry Brigade "Galicia" (L–R)

In July, he was named as Student Ensign at the General Air Academy in Murcia. In September 1987, he began his air force training there where he learned to fly aircraft. In 1989, he was promoted to lieutenant in the Army, ensign in the Navy, and lieutenant in the Air Force. In 1992, he was promoted to captain in the Air Force. In 1993, he was promoted to lieutenant in the Navy and captain in the Infantry of the Army.

Further promotions in 2000 were commandant in the Army, corvette captain in the Navy, and commandant in the Air Force. Promotions in 2009 were lieutenant colonel in the Army, frigate captain in the Navy, and lieutenant colonel in the Air Force.

Since 19 June 2014, after his accession to the throne, he acquired the rank of Captain General (Commander-in-chief) of all the Spanish armies (Army, Navy and Air Force). During the 2016 Pascua Militar, the Chief of the Defence Staff, Fernando García Sánchez, on behalf of the Armed Forces, gave the monarch a personalized command baton, which symbolizes the loyalty of the armies to the king and the command he has over them. The piece, made by some jewelers from León, is made of cherry wood and the tips are adorned with silver pieces.

Felipe speaks Spanish, Catalan, French, English and some Greek.

=== Participation in the Olympics ===
Felipe was a member of the Spanish Olympic sailing team at the 1992 Summer Olympics held in Barcelona. Felipe took part in the opening ceremony as the Spanish team's flag bearer. The Spanish crew finished in sixth place in the Soling class and obtained an Olympic diploma. He is an honorary member of the International Soling Association. Both his mother and uncle, King Constantine II of Greece, were on the Greek sailing team at the 1960 Summer Olympics in Rome (his mother as a substitute), and Felipe's father and sister were also Olympic sailors for Spain.

=== Marriage and children ===
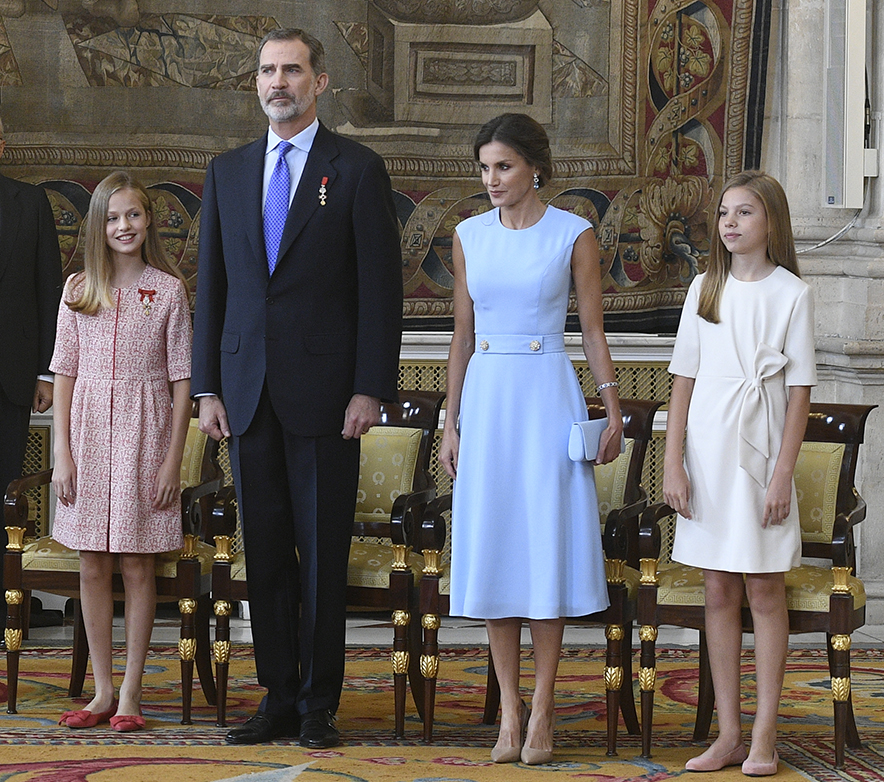
King Felipe VI, Queen Letizia and their two daughters, the Princess of Asturias and Infanta Sofia, in June 2019

Felipe's bachelor years were a source of interest to the Spanish press for several years. His name was linked with several eligible women, but only two notable girlfriends: Spanish noblewoman Isabel Sartorius, around 1989 to 1991, daughter of the Marquess of Mariño, who was viewed unfavorably by the Royal Family due to her mother's cocaine addiction, and Norwegian model Eva Sannum, who modeled underwear.

Although there were some engagement rumors in the previous weeks, on 31 October 2003, a TV program called Con T de Tarde announced unexpectedly that the Prince of Asturias was dating Letizia Ortiz Rocasolano, a television journalist who had been married previously. The following day, the Royal Household made official their engagement. According to the Royal House, they met in late 2002. The official hand petition was made on 6 November 2003 at the Royal Palace of El Pardo. Felipe proposed with a 16-carat diamond engagement ring with a white gold trim and gifted her with a pearl and sapphire necklace. Ortiz marked the occasion by giving him white gold and sapphire cufflinks and a classic book, El doncel de don Enrique el doliente by Mariano José de Larra.

The wedding, which was officiated by the archbishop of Madrid and president of the Spanish Episcopal Conference, Antonio María Rouco Varela, took place on the morning of 22 May 2004 in the Almudena Cathedral, with representatives of royal families from all over the world and most heads of state from Latin America present. In Spain alone, the royal wedding was watched by more than 25 million viewers, the most watched television event in the history of Spanish television.

Felipe and Letizia have two daughters: Leonor, Princess of Asturias (born 31 October 2005) and Infanta Sofía (born 29 April 2007). Both were born at Ruber International Hospital in Madrid.

=== Activities in Spain and abroad ===
Felipe undertook his constitutional duties as heir to the throne, hosting many official events in Spain and participating in all events of different sectors and aspects of Spanish public life. Since October 1995, Felipe has represented the Crown on a series of official visits to the Spanish regions, starting with Valencia. Felipe has held regular meetings with constitutional bodies and state institutions keeping up-to-date with their activities. He also attends meetings of the various bodies of the General State Administration and of the Autonomous Communities Administrations as required by his national and international constitutional obligations. In particular, he has held meetings with people of his generation who have built successful careers in political, economic, cultural and media circles. As part of his military training, Felipe trained as a military helicopter pilot. On occasions when King Juan Carlos I was unable to attend, Felipe presided over the annual presentation of dispatches to officers and non-commissioned officers in the Armed Forces as well as participating in military exercises held by the three Armed Services.

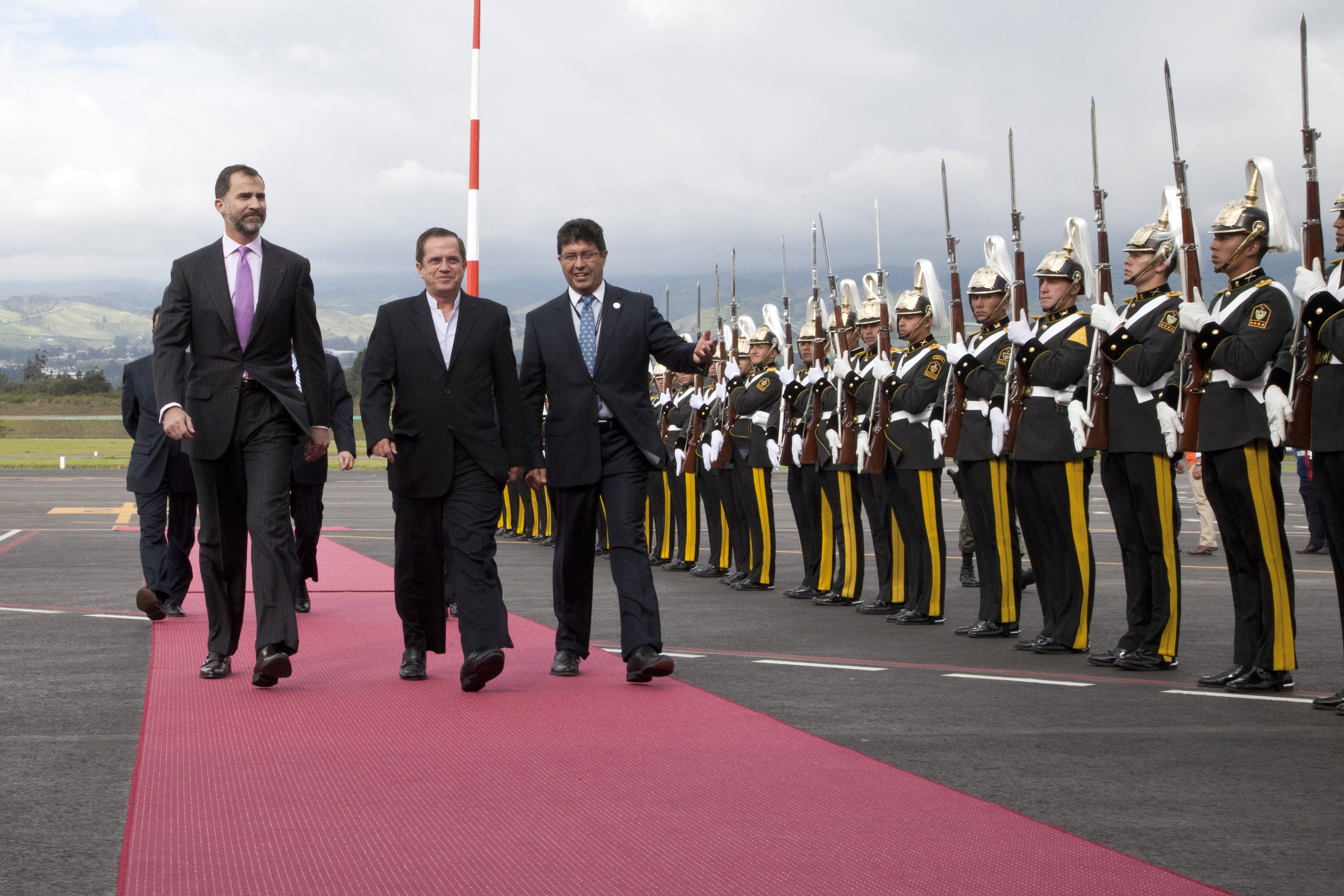
Prince Felipe arriving for the third inauguration of Rafael Correa, 2013

Since January 1996, Felipe has represented Spain at many Latin American presidents' inauguration ceremonies. As Prince, he visited every country in Latin America except Cuba, which he visited as King in 11–14 November 2019. He made over 200 foreign trips in total.

Felipe has also played an active role in promoting Spain's economic, commercial and cultural interests and the Spanish language abroad. He frequently represents Spain at world economic and trade events (e.g. Expotecnia, Expoconsumo, and Expohabitat), and is especially interested in promoting the creation of Centres and University Chairs to advance the study of Spain both historically and in the present-day at major foreign universities.

Following the March 2004 Madrid bombings, Felipe, along with his sisters Elena and Cristina, took part in a public demonstration.

=== Social activities ===
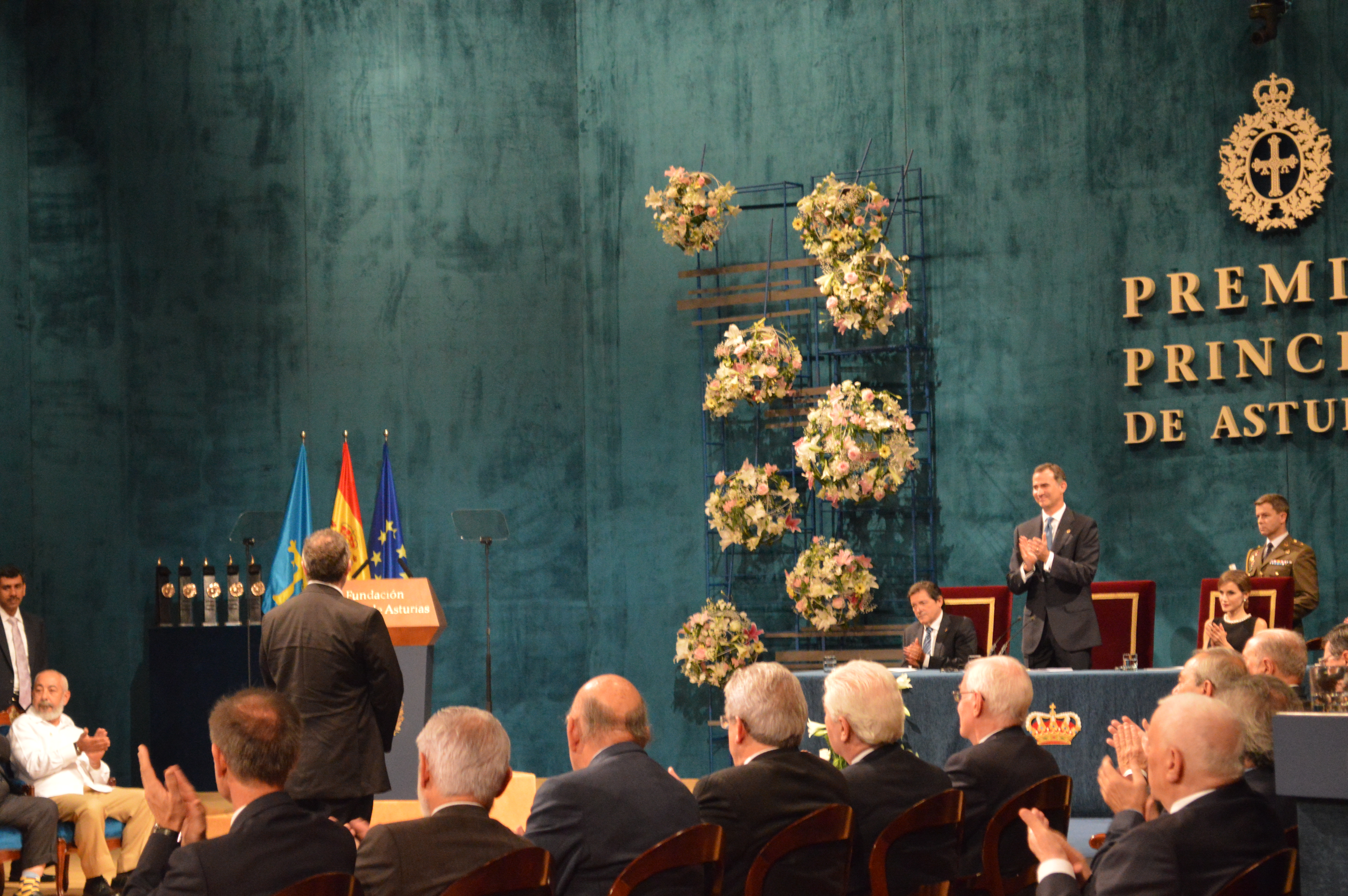
Felipe VI presiding over the 2015 Princess of Asturias Awards in Oviedo

In addition to his official activities, Felipe serves as honorary president of several associations and foundations, such as the Codespa Foundation, which finances economic and social development in Ibero-America and other countries, and the Spanish branch of the Association of European Journalists, comprising outstanding communications professionals. Most noteworthy is the Prince of Asturias Foundation, where he presides annually at the international awards ceremony of the highly prestigious Princess of Asturias Awards (formerly the Prince of Asturias Awards).

Felipe was appointed a "UN-Eminent Person" by UN Secretary General Kofi Annan in 2001, during its International Year of Volunteers, and continues to make contributions internationally towards enhancing the importance of voluntary work.

Felipe is a member of the Sons of the American Revolution due to his ancestor Charles III of Spain.

== Reign ==
=== Accession ===
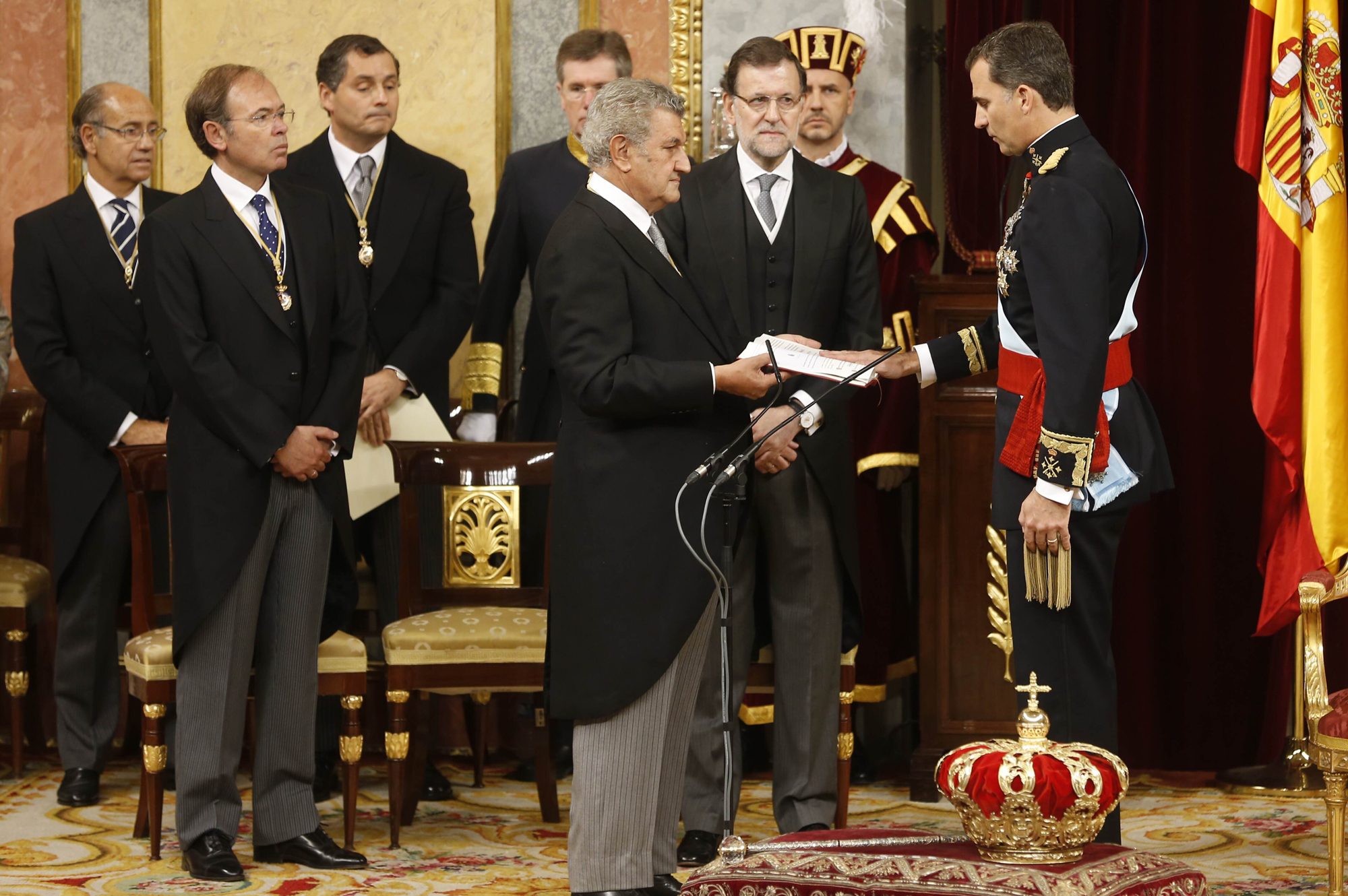
Felipe VI takes the oath before the Cortes Generales during the proclamation ceremony at the Palacio de las Cortes, Madrid, 19 June 2014.

On 2 June 2014, King Juan Carlos announced his intent to abdicate in Felipe's favor. As required by the Constitution of Spain, the Council of Ministers began deliberations the following day on an organic law to give effect to the abdication. The law had to be passed by a majority of all members of the Congress of Deputies, the lower house of the Cortes Generales. According to Jesús Posada, the president of the Congress of Deputies, Felipe could be proclaimed king as early as 18 June. On 4 June, El País of Madrid reported that Felipe would indeed be proclaimed king on 18 June.

Felipe ascended the throne at the stroke of midnight on 19 June; his father had given his sanction to the organic law effecting his abdication just hours earlier. The next morning, after receiving the Captain General's sash from his father (symbolizing the transfer of royal and military power), he was formally sworn in and proclaimed king in a low-key ceremony held in the Cortes. He swore to uphold the Constitution before formally being proclaimed king by Posada. Upon his accession, he became the youngest monarch in Europe, being nine months younger than King Willem-Alexander of the Netherlands.

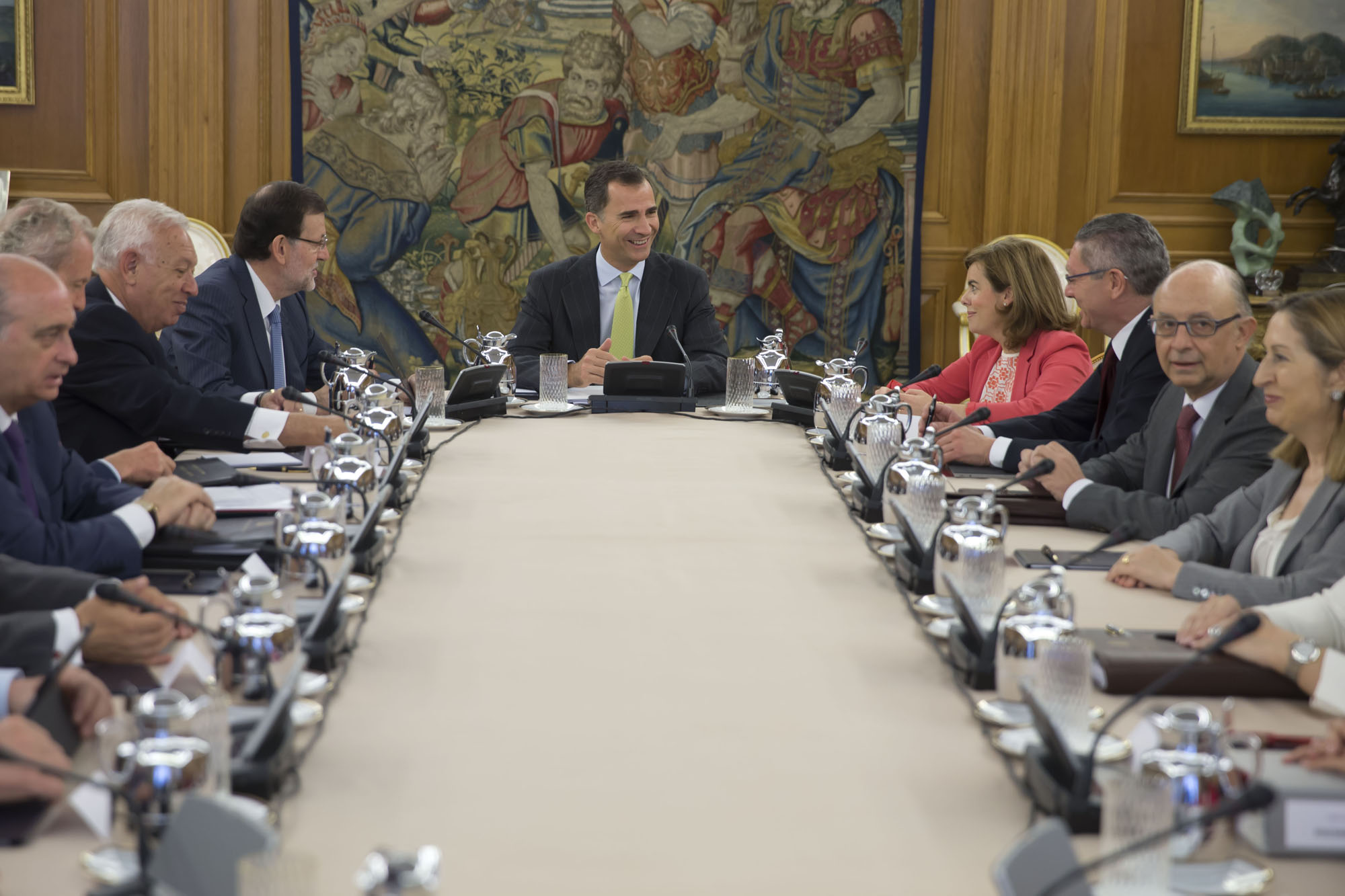
Felipe VI chairing his first Council of Ministers, at direct request of prime minister Mariano Rajoy (18 July 2014)

As king, Felipe has fairly extensive reserve powers on paper. He is the guardian of the Constitution and is responsible for ensuring it is obeyed and followed. It was expected that he would follow his father's practice of taking a mostly ceremonial and representative role, acting largely on the advice of the government. He indicated as much in a speech to the Cortes on the day of his enthronement, saying that he would be "a loyal head of state who is ready to listen and understand, warn and advise as well as to defend the public interest at all times". While he is nominally chief executive, he is not politically responsible for exercising his powers. Per the Constitution, his acts are not valid unless countersigned by a minister, who then assumes political responsibility for the act in question.

A poll conducted by El País, however, indicates that a majority of Spaniards wish Felipe would play a greater role in politics, with 75% of the 600 people surveyed stating they would approve if he personally pushed the political parties to reach agreements on national problems. According to an El Mundo newspaper poll, Felipe had a greater approval than his father prior to his reign. During a poll conducted in 2025, Felipe VI gained approval of some 44% of the respondents; 21% voiced their disapproval and 35% remained neutral. The approval rate was visibly higher among females than among males; it was the highest in Andalusia, and the lowest in Catalonia. The poll made public in 2026 revealed that on a scale from 0 to 10, Felipe VI gained an average rate of 6.1; PP voters rated him at 7.9, PSOE voters at 6.5, VOX voters at 5.5 and Podemos/Sumar voters at 4.9.

On 23 June 2014, he appointed his private secretary since 1995, Jaime Alfonsín, as Private Secretary to the King. Two days later, he also appointed José Manuel de Zuleta y Alejandro, 14th duke of Abrantes, as Private Secretary to the Queen.

On 18 July, the new king chaired his first meeting of the Council of Ministers.

=== Household reforms ===
During his ascension speech, Felipe pledged a "renewed monarchy for a new time". A few days later after this, Felipe and Letizia became the first Spanish monarchs to receive and recognize LGBT organisations at the Palace. Felipe also changed the protocol in order to allow people to take the oath of office without a crucifix or Bible. This did not mean, in any way, a change in his relations with the Catholic Church or religion, in fact, on their first overseas trip as king and queen, Felipe VI and Letizia met Pope Francis in the Apostolic Palace on 30 June 2014. They subsequently met with Cardinal Secretary of State Pietro Parolin and Under-Secretary for Relations with States Antoine Camilleri. The visit followed one by King Juan Carlos I and Queen Sofía on 28 April.

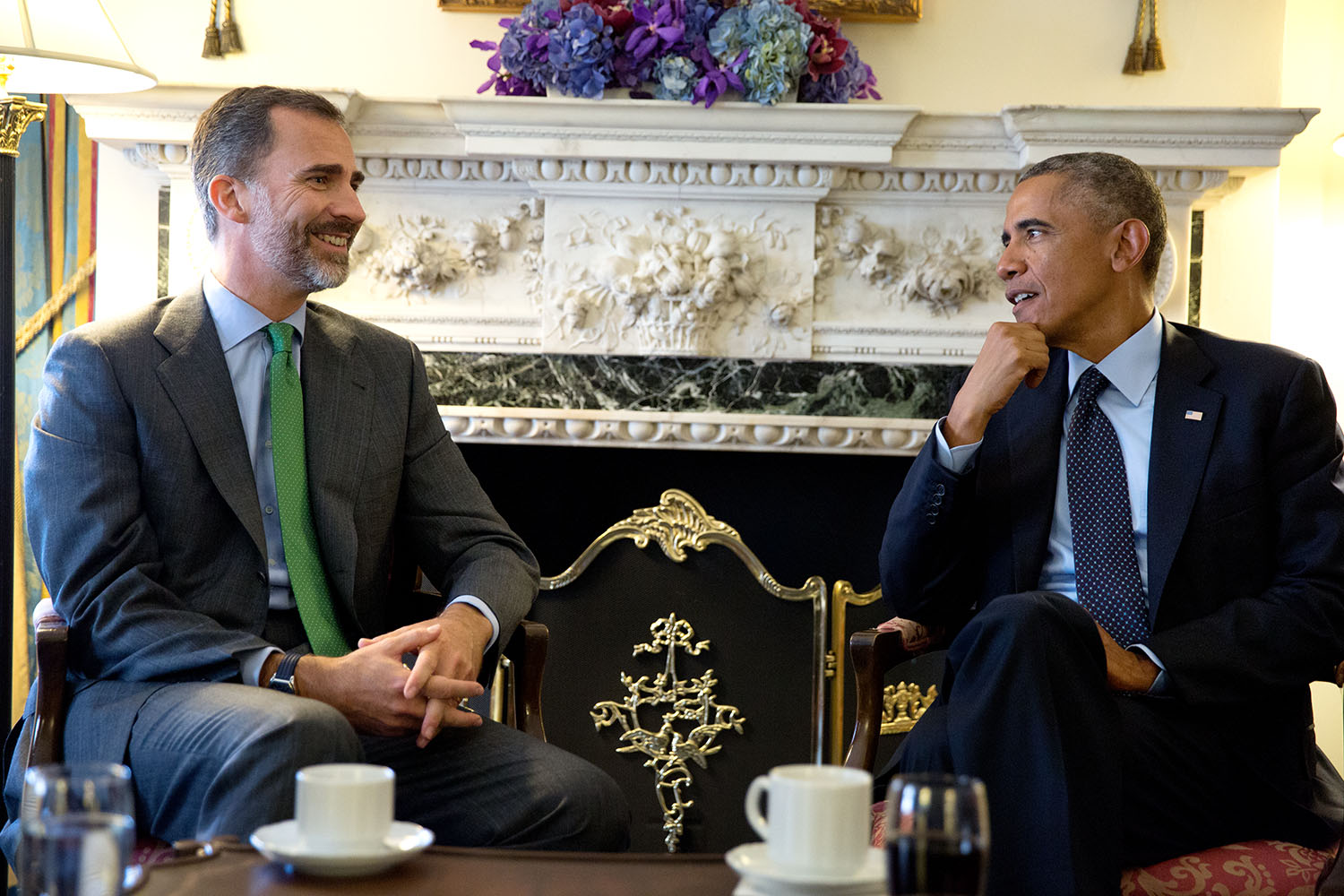
King Felipe VI meets with US president Barack Obama at the Waldorf Astoria New York, 2014.

The king also established a difference between the royal family and the King's family, leaving his sisters and their descendants outside the royal family and, therefore, not carrying out institutional representation of the Crown (although they do it occasionally). In July 2014, the king banned the royal family from working outside the Royal Household and he established an external audit made by the Office of the Comptroller General of the State.

Following orders from the king, since 1 January 2015, the Spanish royal family cannot accept "expensive gifts" when "they exceed social or courtesy uses". In February 2015, Felipe announced he would cut his annual salary by 20% as a result of the economic recession and hardships continuing to hamper Spain.

In June 2015, Felipe VI stripped his sister, Infanta Cristina, of her royal title of Duchess of Palma de Mallorca, after the tax fraud allegations surrounding her and her husband, Iñaki Urdangarín. While her husband was eventually sentenced to six years in prison, she was acquitted of all charges.

In 2017, the Crown opened for the first time the gardens of the royal family's vacation palace, the Marivent Palace, at the request of the regional government of the Balearic Islands. The public can enjoy the gardens as long as the royal family is not there.

In February 2024, the king appointed a new Private Secretary, diplomat Camilo Villarino, at that time Head of the Cabinet of the High Representative of the Union for Foreign Affairs and Security Policy, Josep Borrell. Villarino replaced Jaime Alfonsín, 1st Marquess of Alfonsín, private secretary to Felipe for almost 30 years, both as prince and king. Alfonsín remains in the Household as private counselor. Likewise, in April 2024 the king appointed a new private secretary to the Queen, State lawyer María Dolores Ocaña Madrid, replacing the Duke of Abrantes. At the end of 2024, the king concluded the renewal of the senior positions of his Household, appointing two other women: parliamentary clerk Mercedes Araújo Díaz de Terán was appointed Secretary-General; diplomat Carmen Castiella Ruiz de Velasco was appointed Diplomatic Counselor. In September 2025, journalist Marta Carazo assumed as private secretary to the Queen.

==== 2020 royal finances controversy ====
On 15 March 2020, following the revelation in The Daily Telegraph that Felipe VI appeared as second beneficiary (after his father) of the Lucum Foundation, the entity on the receiving end of a €65 million donation by Abdullah bin Abdulaziz, King of Saudi Arabia, the Royal Household issued a statement declaring (a) that Felipe VI would renounce any inheritance from his father to which he could be entitled, and (b) that Juan Carlos would lose his public stipend from the part of the General State Budget dedicated to the Royal Household. The renunciation of the inheritance is a mere declaration of intent, since the Spanish Civil Code prevents accepting or rejecting an inheritance until the death of the person who bequeaths takes place. The Royal Household also implied that Felipe VI already had prior knowledge of the Lucum Foundation and his condition as beneficiary of the latter since April 2019.

After this controversy, in April 2022 the Council of Ministers approved a Royal Decree elaborated by the Royal Household that puts the King's house completely under the 2013 Transparency Act and the 2015 Senior Officials Act. This implies, on the one hand, a greater control of the Crown's finances, since the Court of Auditors will be able to audit its accounts; on the other hand, the disclosure of the wealth of the king and of the senior officials of the Household.

On 25 April 2022, in a move towards greater transparency, Felipe VI made public his personal assets for the first time, revealing them to be valued at 2.6 million euros (US$2.8 million). The Spanish royal palace stated that his wealth is in savings, current accounts and securities, as well as art, antiques and jewelry; and that he has no real estate or financial dealings abroad. It also noted that Felipe VI had paid tax on all his financial earnings. This amount makes him one of the least wealthy monarchs in the world, despite previous estimates of his father Juan Carlos I's wealth being estimated between $2–2.3 billion.

=== National politics ===
==== Dissolution of Parliament ====
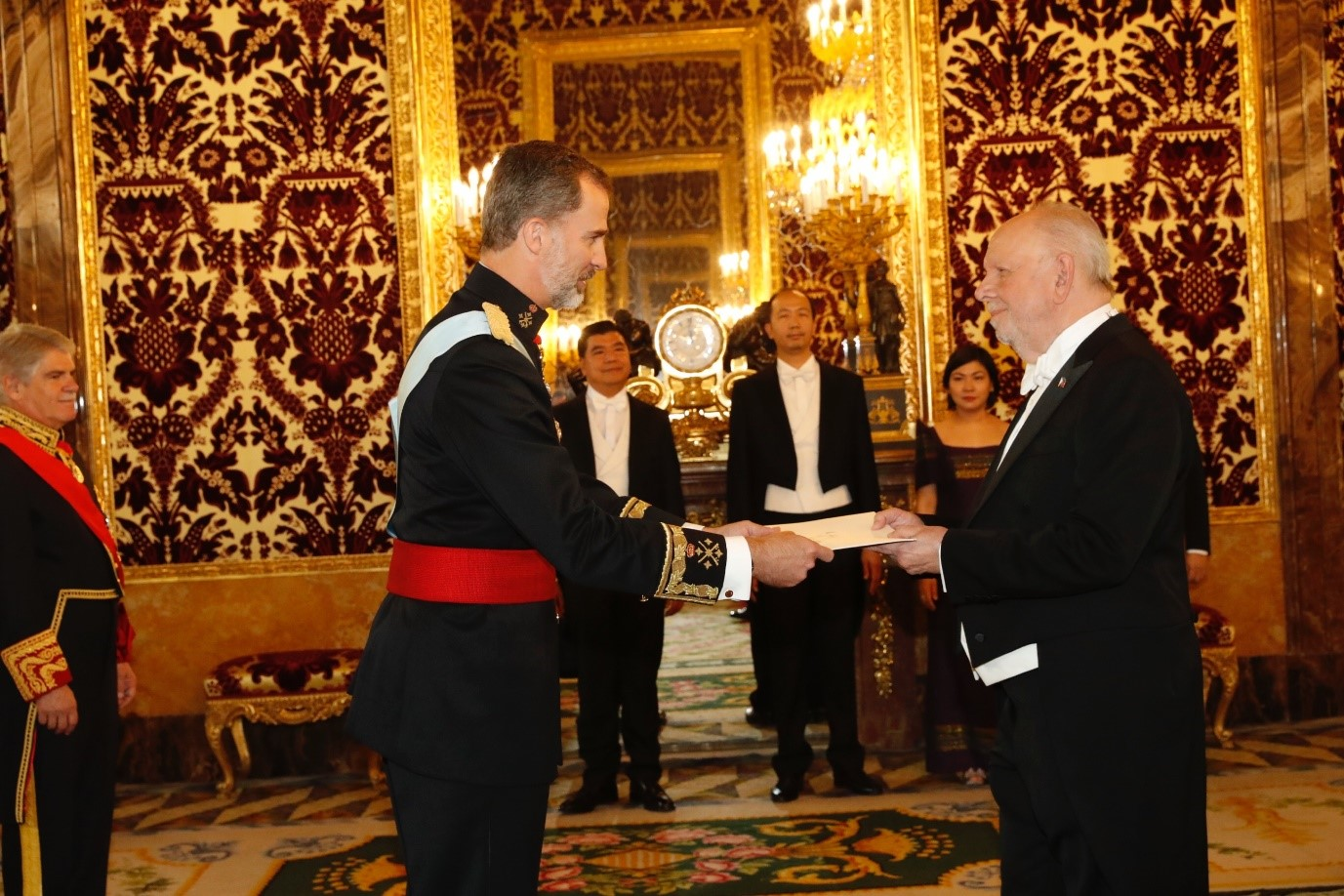
The King receiving the credentials from the Philippines ambassador Philippe Lhuillier, 2017

The elections in 2015 resulted in no party winning enough seats to form a government. No agreements with the different parties were successful. After months of talks with the different party leaders, and with there being no apparent candidate in a position of support in forming a government, the king issued a royal decree dissolving parliament with new elections being called in June. This marked the first time since the transition to democracy that an election was called under Article 99.5 of the Constitution, wherein the initiative for issuing the dissolution of the Cortes belonged to the King and not to the Prime Minister.

After the second elections, some socialist MPs abstained in order to make it easy for the conservative prime minister, Mariano Rajoy, to form a new government. The king swore in the new cabinet on 4 November 2016.

==== Catalan independence referendum ====
On 3 October 2017, as huge protest rallies and a general strike took place in Catalonia following the 2017 Catalan independence referendum that was deemed illegal by Spanish authorities, Felipe delivered an unusually strongly worded televised address, watched by more than 12 million people across the country, in which he condemned the actions of the referendum organizers for acting "outside the law", accusing them of "unacceptable disloyalty" and of "eroding the harmony and co-existence within Catalan society itself". He also warned the referendum could put the economy of the entire north-east region of Spain at risk.

Reactions to Felipe's speech were mixed. Party officials from the PP, PSOE and Ciudadanos applauded the King's "commitment to legality" and the "defense of the Constitution, the [regional] Statute, the rule of law and the territorial integrity of Spain", whereas leaders from Unidos Podemos and Catalunya en Comú criticized it "as unworthy as it was irresponsible", paving the way for a harsh intervention of the Catalan autonomy. Some PSOE leaders were upset that the King had not made any call to understanding or dialogue between the Spanish and Catalan governments.

After the speech, where Felipe ordered the "legitimate powers of the State" to ensure "constitutional order", the Spanish government started the process to apply article 155 of the Constitution, which gives special powers to the central government to intervene in a Spanish region. On 27 October 2017, the Spanish Senate approved government proposal to impose direct rule in the region with the support of conservative and socialist votes. The Spanish government dismissed all Catalan authorities, dissolved the regional parliament and called for early elections in 2017.

==== Conservative government fall and political instability ====
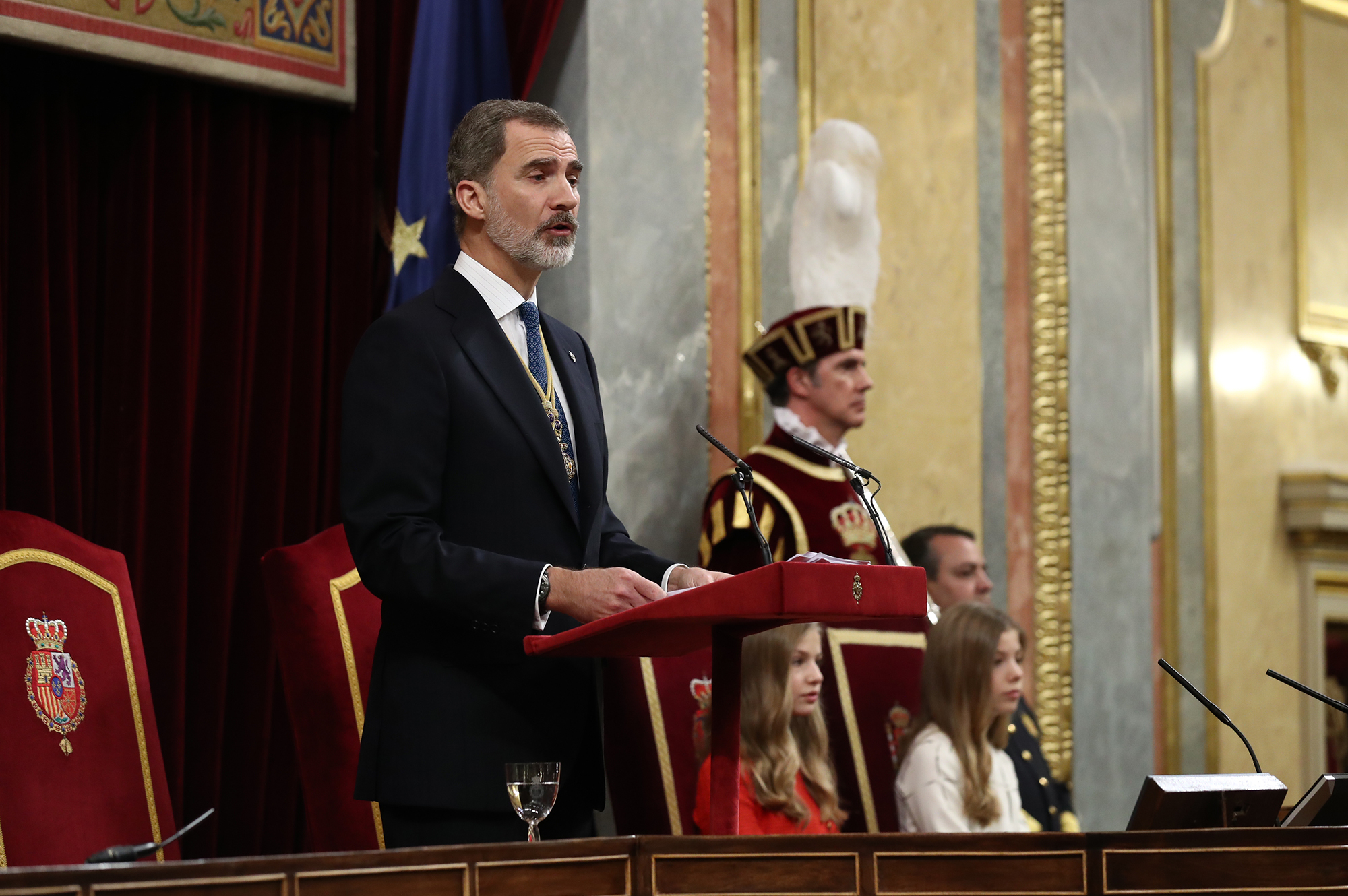
Felipe VI during his opening speech of the Cortes Generales in 2020

In May 2018, the Audiencia Nacional issued a ruling finding the ruling party, People's Party, guilty as beneficiary of some corruption cases. The left-wing opposition, led by socialist Pedro Sánchez, called for a vote of no confidence against the conservative prime minister. The Congress of Deputies approved the motion on 1 June 2018, and the King appointed Sánchez as new prime minister on 2 June. The socialist minority government lasted for a year and a half, and fell in February 2019 after the government failed to pass the budget.

Although the Socialists won the April 2019 general election, the political scenario was left wide open. The socialist prime minister refused to agree with the leaders of left-wing populist Podemos, and the King dissolved Parliament. The November general election had the same result as in April, so the prime minister agreed to a coalition. Felipe swore in the new coalition cabinet on 13 January 2020.

==== COVID-19 pandemic ====
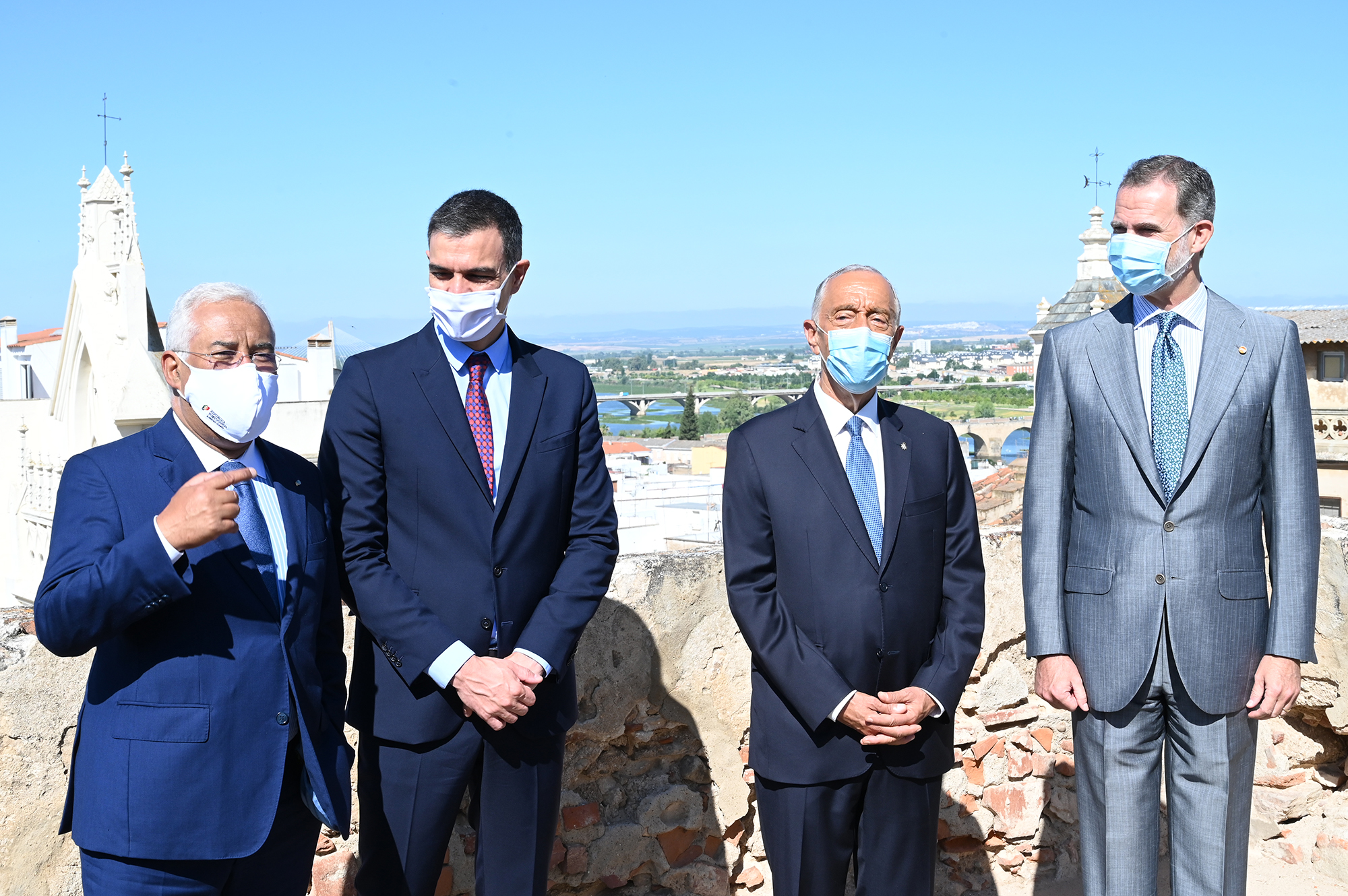
Felipe VI with the heads of state and government of Portugal and Spanish Prime Minister in July 2020 in Badajoz

On 18 March 2020, a widespread cacerolada from the balconies of some cities across Spain took place, in an attempt to counter-program the TV discourse of Felipe VI on the COVID-19 pandemic in the country. The intent was to force Juan Carlos I to donate to public healthcare the €100M he had allegedly obtained through kickbacks from Saudi Arabia, which was ultimately dismissed. Despite the attempt to boycott the speech, it was seen by more than 15 million citizens, making it the most watched speech by a monarch in the history of Spain. In July, he led a memorial paying tribute to victims of the pandemic at the Royal Palace.

In December 2021, Felipe VI warned against virus complacency during the pandemic, stating that "the risk has not disappeared."

In the context of the COVID-19 pandemic, King Felipe had to isolate himself in quarantine for testing positive for coronavirus on several occasions between 2020 and 2022. While he was isolated, Queen Letizia replaced him in those events for which she was constitutionally authorized (awards delivery, lunches, event openings, etc.) but not in those activities tightly related to constitutional responsibilities (such as the working meeting with the president of Bosnia and Herzegovina, Željko Komšić, in 2022, which had to be postponed).

==== Duke of Franco ====
The daughter of Francisco Franco, Carmen Franco, was created Duchess of Franco by King Juan Carlos in 1975. After the death of the 1st Duchess of Franco in December 2017, succession of the ducal title with accompanying Grandeeship was requested by her eldest daughter María del Carmen Martínez-Bordiú y Franco. Under Spanish nobiliary law, she was first in line, but did not succeed automatically; with the application to the Crown and the issue of the Royal Letter of Succession, and after an announcement period of thirty days, succession only legally enters into force after a tax is paid.

In 2018, the Izquierda Unida party sent a letter to Felipe VI asking that the title be repressed as a violation of Spain's Historical Memory Law, as the power to make or unmake nobility resides solely in the Spanish monarch and is not covered by that law. The Dukedom was granted to the heir apparent, María del Carmen Martínez-Bordíu y Franco, the eldest daughter of the late Duchess, in the same year, as published in the Official State Gazette on 4 July 2018.

However, the title was abolished on 21 October 2022, under the purview of the Law of Democratic Memory.

==== 2023 Spanish general election and third Sánchez government ====
The coalition government formed in 2020 led to almost a complete legislature of stability, however, in May 2023, local and regional elections were held. The result of these elections could not have been worse for the government; although the Socialist Party held up well, losing just 400,000 votes compared to the 2019 regional and local elections, the parties to its left collapsed and, in many regions and cities, disappeared, causing the Socialists to lose most of their regional and local power.

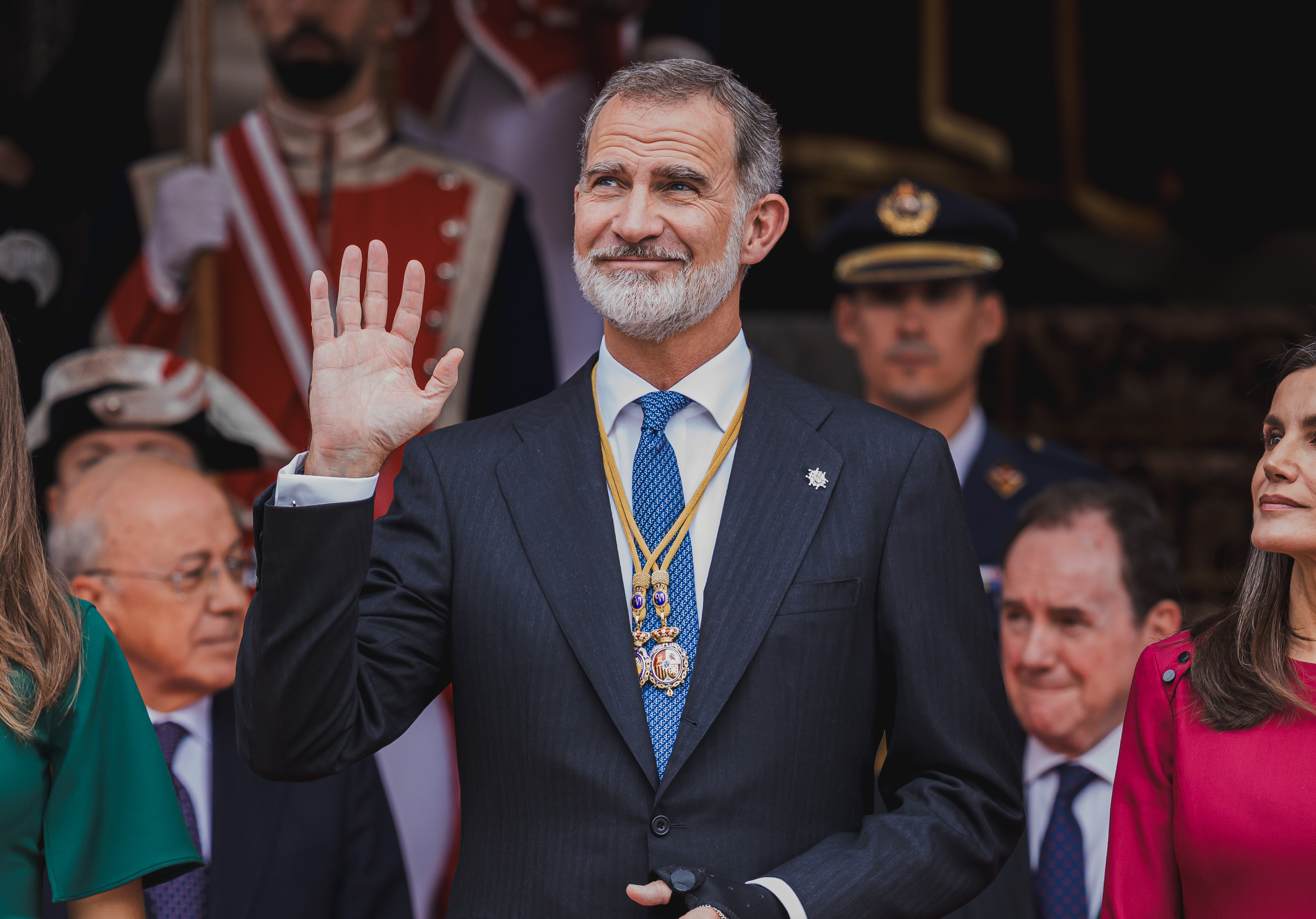
King Felipe greeting citizens at the solemn opening of the 15th Cortes Generales in November 2023

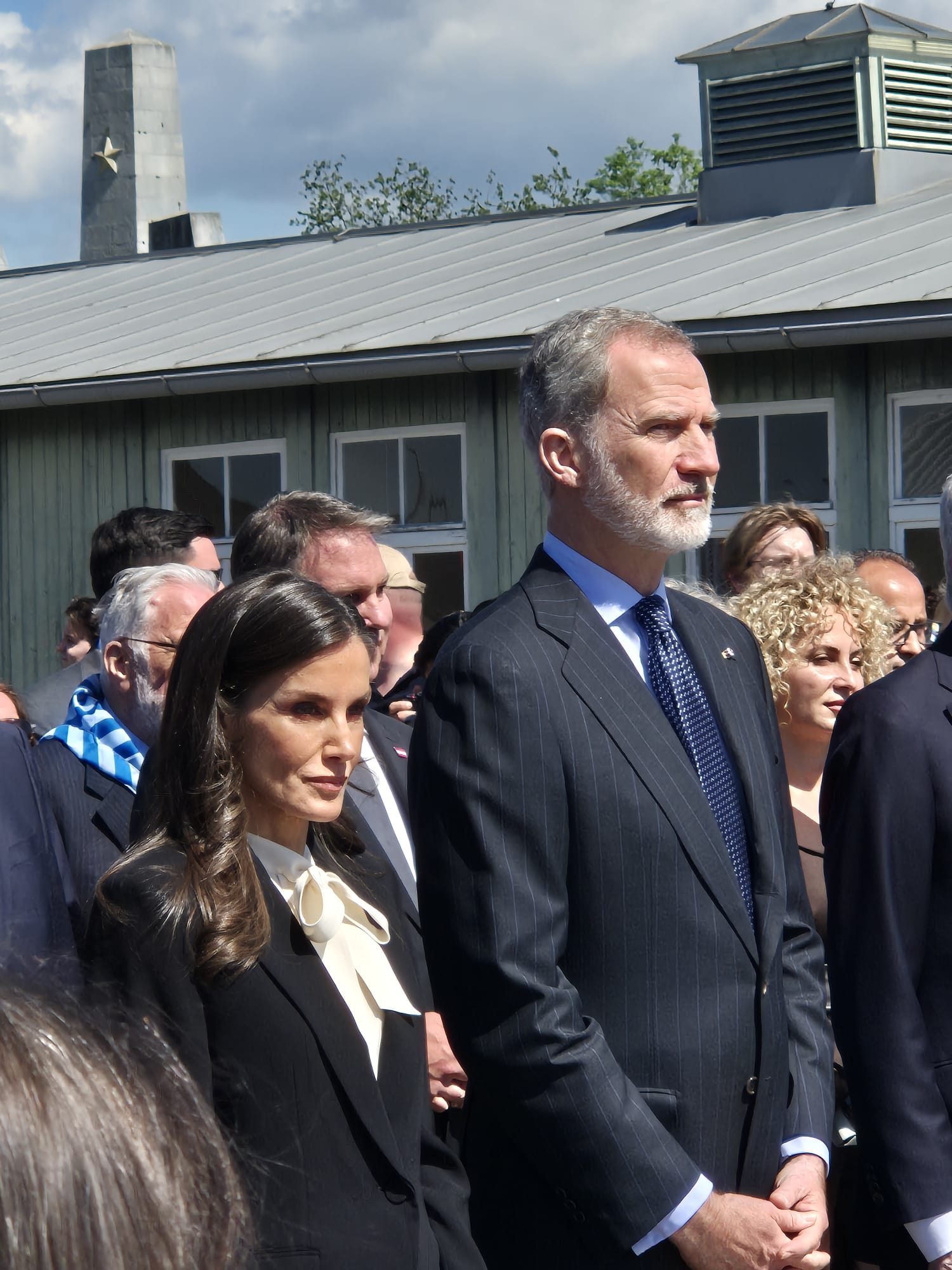
King Felipe and Queen Letizia on 11 May 2025, in Mauthausen, during the celebration of the 80th anniversary of the liberation of the extermination camp

After this disastrous result, the Socialist prime minister, Pedro Sánchez, requested the king to dissolve Parliament and call early elections with the aim of "clarifying the [will of the] Spanish people about the political forces that should lead this new phase and the policies to be applied". As happened in the regional and local elections, the People's Party led by Alberto Núñez Feijóo won the election, but he fell short of a majority to form a new conservative government. In general, this was considered a victory for Sánchez, who still had a chance to renew its coalition government.

After meeting with political parties represented in parliament, and after verifying that neither Sánchez nor Núñez Feijóo had a sufficient majority to form a government, on 22 August 2023 the king asked the winner of the elections, Alberto Núñez Feijóo, to form a government. As expected, Núñez Feijóo failed to gather enough support to govern and the Congress of Deputies rejected his candidacy. Following new meetings with political parties on early October, the king nominated acting prime minister Pedro Sánchez. After obtaining the support of Sumar and the pro-independence and regionalist political parties, the Congress of Deputies re-elected Sánchez on 16 November 2023 and the king swore in the new cabinet on 21 November 2023.

On 3 November 2024, King Felipe, Queen Letizia, Prime Minister Sánchez and Valencian president Carlos Mazón were violently confronted during a meeting with victims of the October 2024 Spain floods in Paiporta in the Valencian Community, who threw mud and objects at them and injured two bodyguards. Although the Prime Minister had to be evacuated, the monarchs remained there listening to the complaints and requests of the residents. After the incident, the visit to neighboring towns was postponed, but the Royal Household confirmed that they would return "in the next few days". The king returned to the region on 12 November to check the efforts of the Armed Forces in the disaster and, in 19 November, the monarchs resumed the visit canceled two weeks earlier.

On 5 October 2026, on the advice of the prime minister, King Felipe VI dissolved Parliament and called early elections for 29 November 2026.

=== Accession anniversary ===
In 2024 Felipe marked his 10th anniversary of his accession and, for this occasion, the king renewed his motto: "Servicio, compromiso y deber" (English: "Service, commitment and duty"). As was customary during his reign, it was announced that the events to celebrate this anniversary would be discreet.

The celebrations began in the Royal Palace, when the royal family presided, from the interior balcony of the palace, over the Royal Guard changing. Subsequently, and after greeting the citizens who approached the palace, the king presented the Order of Civil Merit to 19 anonymous citizens, each from a Spanish region, as well as from the autonomous cities of Ceuta and Melilla. This event ended with a lunch for the invited authorities and the recipients. Before the start of lunch, the Princess of Asturias and Infanta Sofía surprised the king with an improvised speech to congratulate him on the anniversary.

In the afternoon, the monarch's daughters visited the Royal Collections Gallery with 40 young people who, at some point, won the contest "What is a King to you?", organized annually by the Royal Household and two private foundations that promotes the monarchy. On this occasion, the monarchs surprised the attendees by attending the event when it was not planned. To conclude the celebrations, public concerts were held in the Royal Palace, including one of the violinist Ara Malikian, as well as a projection of images on the façade of the palace attended by the royal family.

After a year of celebrations across the country, the anniversary concluded on 18 June 2025 with another concert in Madrid's Plaza Mayor, performed by the Royal Guard.

On 19 June 2025, on the 11th anniversary of the proclamation of the sovereign, the Royal Household announced the creation by King Felipe of his first nobility titles. Jaime Alfonsín, former secretary of the king was created Marquess of Alfonsín and Grandee of Spain, while former tennis player Rafael Nadal was created Marquess of Llevant de Mallorca, swimmer Teresa Perales was created Marchioness of Perales, singer Luz Casal was created Marchioness of Luz y Paz, biochemist Carlos López Otín was created Marquess of Castillo de Leres and photographer Cristina García Rodero was created Marchioness of Valle de Alcudia.

=== Sports ===
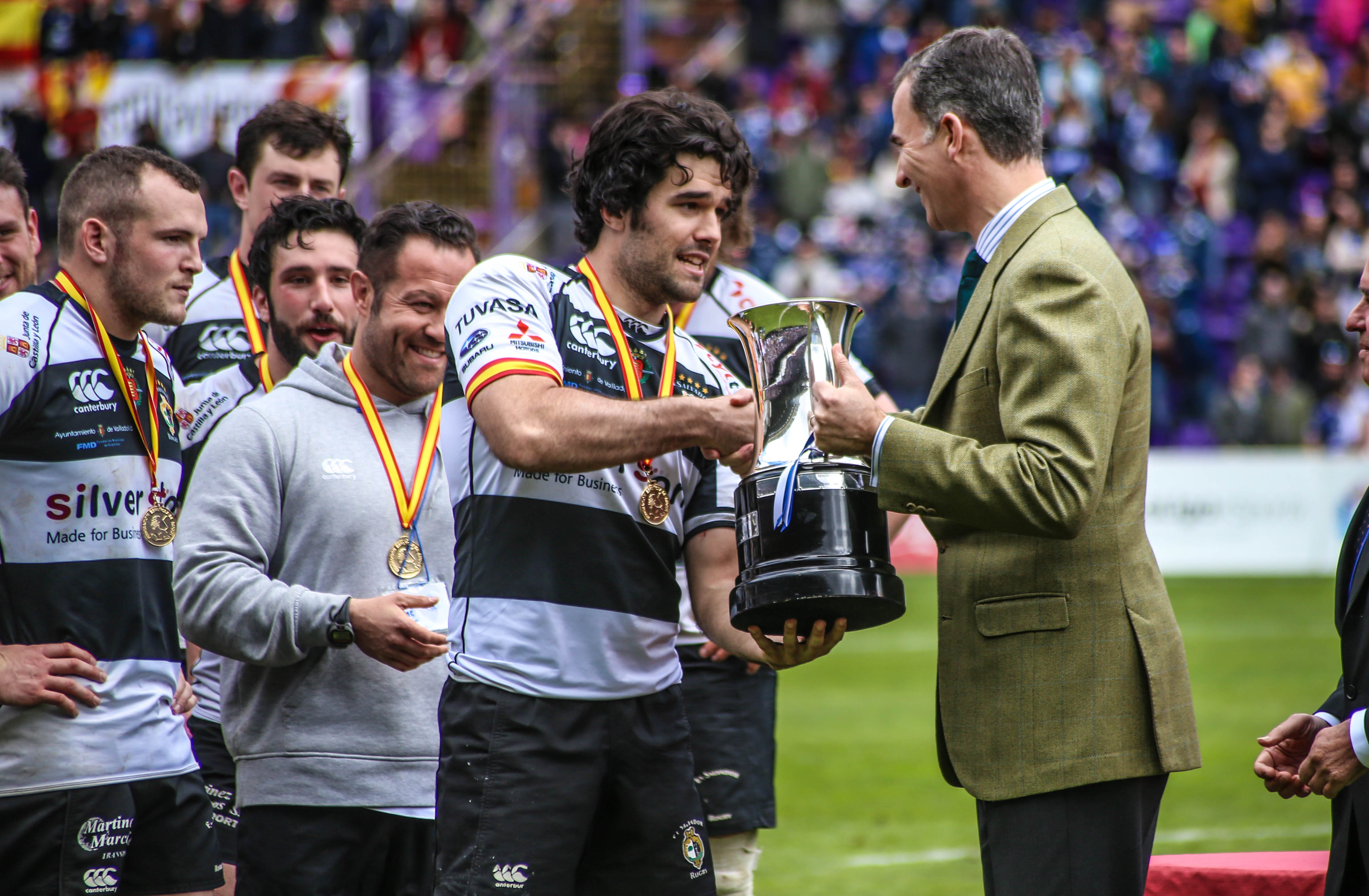
Felipe VI presenting the King's Cup to the winners of the 2016 Copa del Rey de Rugby

Felipe is a huge fan of sports and has attended hundreds of sports events since 1976, when he accompanied his father to a match between Real Madrid and Atlético de Madrid at the 1976 Copa del Generalísimo final. At the end of the event, when asked by journalist about his favourite team, he said Atlético de Madrid. He is also the club's honorary president since 2003. Besides football, he loves skiing, squash and sailing.

As King of Spain, most of the sports have a tournament in his honor, Copa del Rey (English: King's Cup), which he normally attends and delivers the trophy to the winner. Also, since the reign of Alfonso XIII (1886–1931), the King exercises high patronage over the sports federations. Most of them hold the title of "royal" granted by the ruling monarch; the latest federation to receive this honor was the Rugby Federation in 2023.

It is also common for him to attend international sporting events in which Spanish clubs or Spanish national teams participate. If he cannot attend, it is common for him to be replaced by a member of the royal family, such as Leonor, Princess of Asturias and Infanta Sofía in the UEFA Women's Euro 2022 or Queen Letizia in the 2023 FIFA Women's World Cup final.

=== 2017 terrorist attacks ===
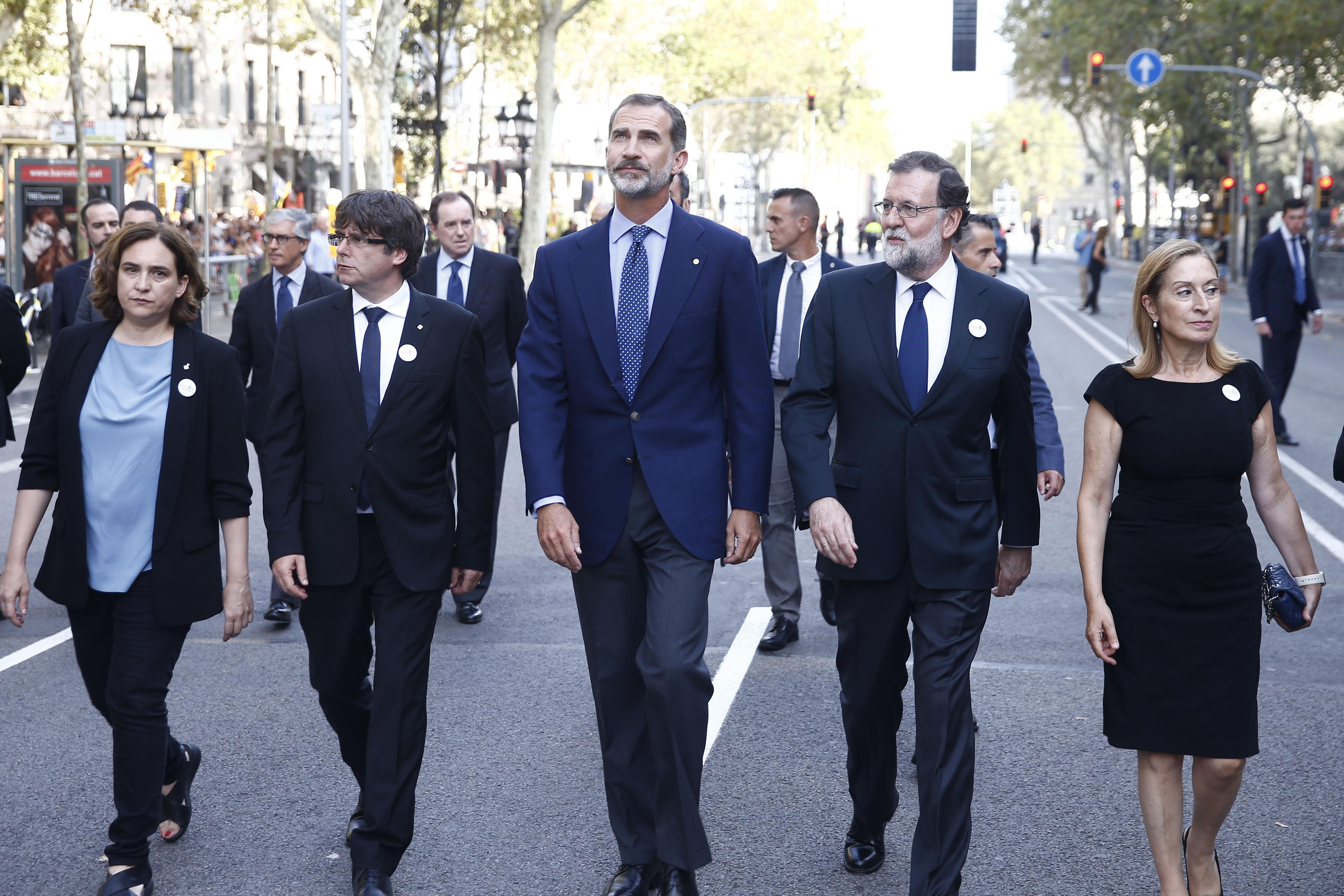
Felipe VI, next to Ada Colau, Carles Puigdemont, Mariano Rajoy, and Ana Pastor, during the anti-terrorist demonstration that followed the August 2017 Barcelona attacks

On the afternoon of 17 August 2017, 22-year-old Younes Abouyaaqoub drove a van into a crowd of pedestrians on La Rambla street in Barcelona, Catalonia, Spain, killing 13 people and injuring at least 130 others, one of whom died as a result of the injuries ten days later, on 27 August. Abouyaaqoub fled the attack on foot, then killed another person in order to steal the victim's car and escape. He was later killed by police in Subirats, a town 31 kilometres (19 mi) west of Barcelona, on 21 August.

Nine hours after the Barcelona attack, five more men, thought to be members of the same terrorist cell, drove into another group of pedestrians in nearby Cambrils, killing one woman and injuring six. All five of these attackers were shot and killed by police.

The Prime Minister of Spain, Mariano Rajoy, called the attack in Barcelona a jihadist attack. Amaq News Agency attributed indirect responsibility for the attack to the Islamic State. The attacks were the deadliest in Spain since the 2004 Madrid train bombings and the deadliest in Barcelona since the 1987 Hipercor bombing.

Police and medical deployment at Plaça Catalunya, Barcelona, the day of the attack

All public events in Barcelona were cancelled, and both Carles Puigdemont, the President of the Generalitat of Catalonia, and Ada Colau, the Mayor of Barcelona, cancelled their holidays to return to the city and take part in crisis management. Likewise, Prime Minister of Spain Mariano Rajoy cancelled his holidays and travelled to Barcelona with the Spanish Deputy Prime Minister, Soraya Sáenz de Santamaría, and Juan Ignacio Zoido, the Spanish Minister of the Interior. Spain declared three days of mourning.

The day after the attacks, a minute's silence led by King Felipe VI, Catalan president Carles Puigdemont, and Barcelona mayor Ada Colau was observed at Plaça de Catalunya, which ended with applause and chants of "No tinc por" ("I am not afraid"). During the following days candles and flowers were left at the Joan Miró mosaic at La Rambla, in memory of the victims. The King and Queen also left a wreath in the name of the Crown.

Political authorities in front of the "No tinc por" ("I am not afraid") demonstration on 26 August, 2017

=== International agenda ===
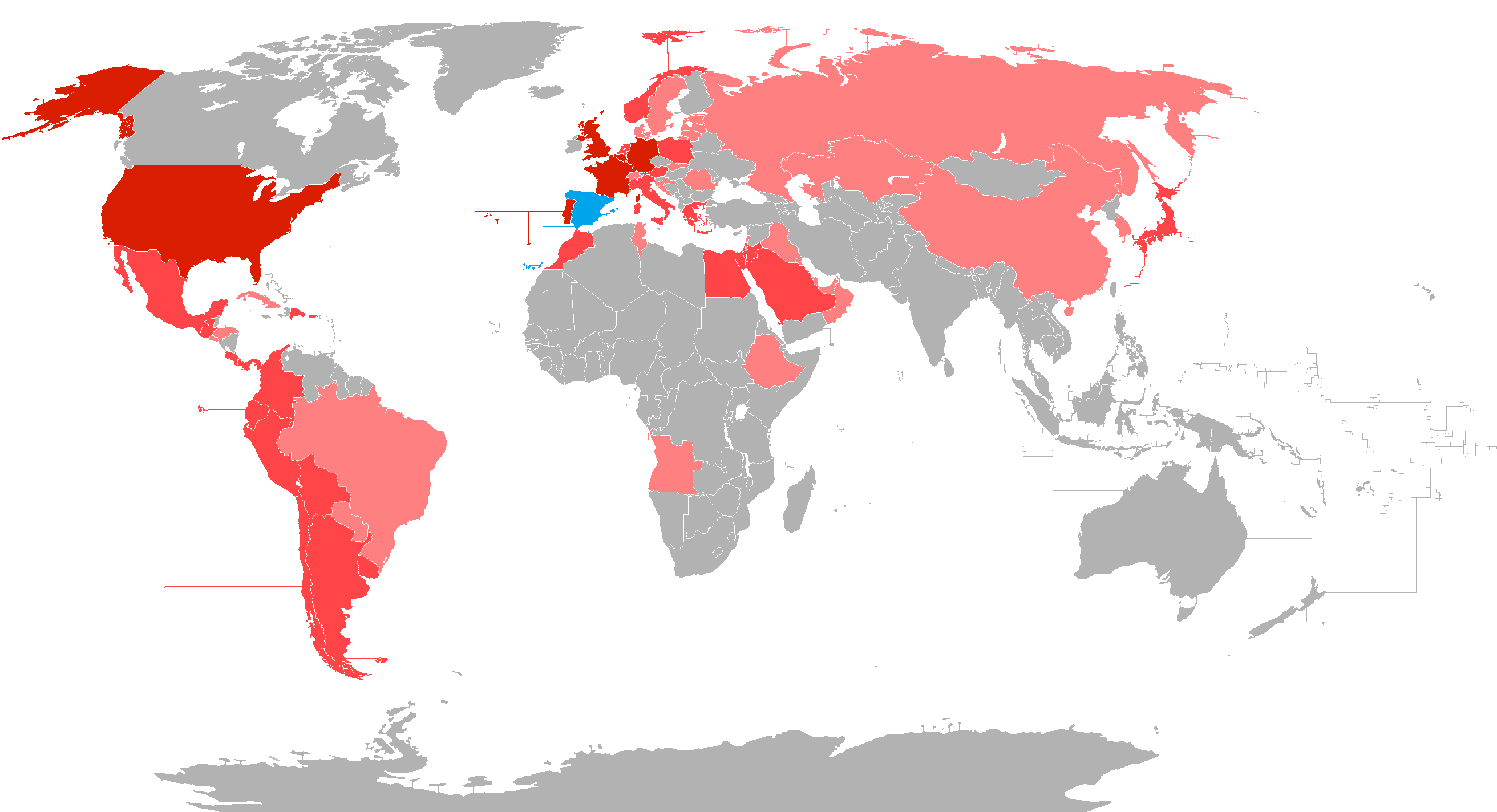
Official visits during his reign

Since his proclamation as king on 19 June 2014, Felipe VI has visited, as of 7 October 2026, 63 sovereign countries on four continents, in 165 official visits abroad (The number of countries includes Puerto Rico, which has the status of "Commonwealth of the United States"). The first international trip was to the Vatican City on 30 June 2014, to meet with the Pope. The last one was as State Visit to the Republic of Finland on 5–7 October 2026.

Most of his visits have been to European countries (25 countries in 93 visits), followed by American countries (20 countries in 48 visits), Asian (13 countries in 17 visits) and African (5 countries in 7 visits). He has never visited an Oceanian country as a king; as prince of Asturias, he visited Australia and New Zealand in 1990.

==== Ibero-America ====
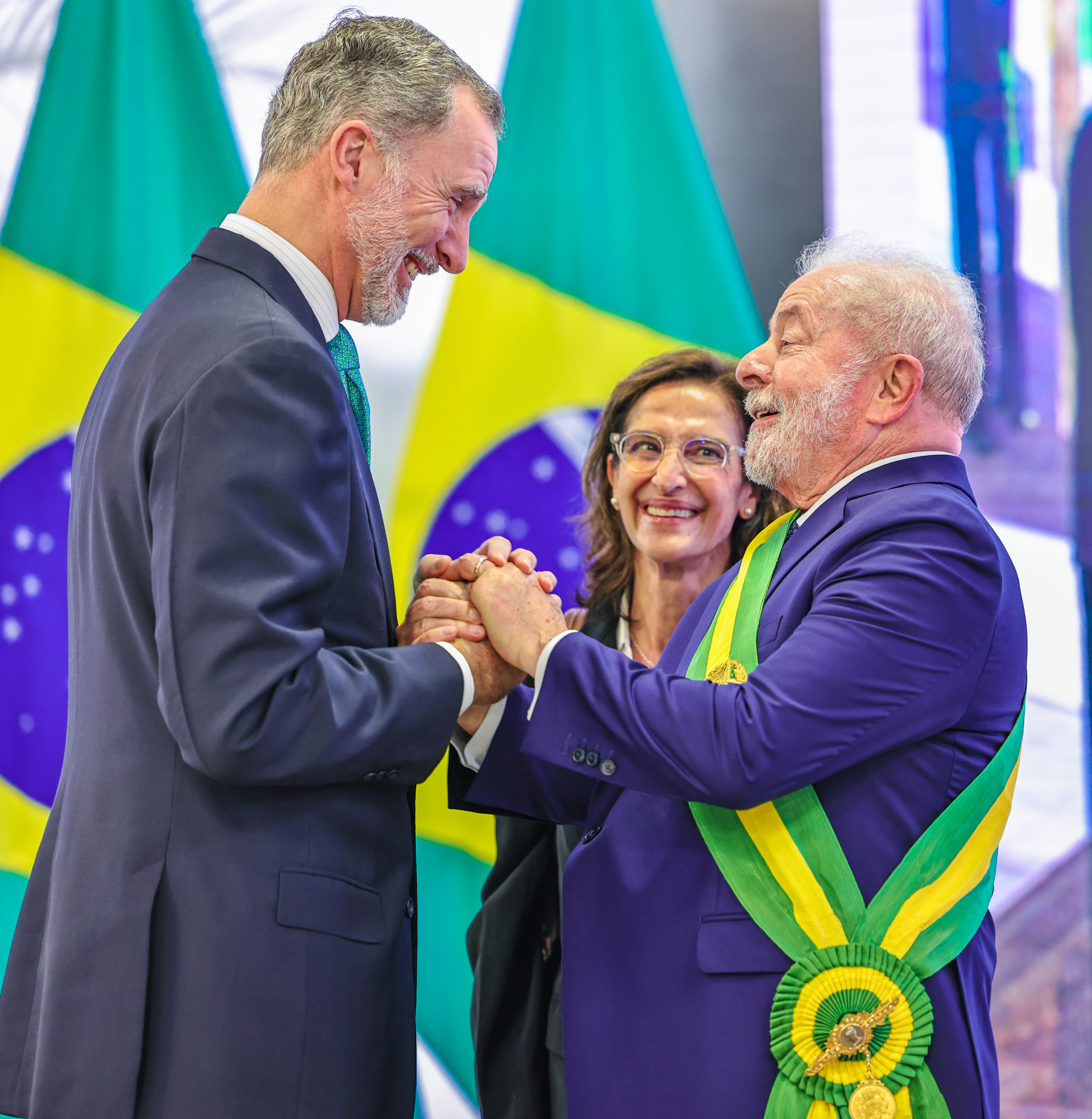
King Felipe and Brazilian president Lula da Silva greeting during Da Silva's 2023 inauguration

Like his father did, Felipe VI has maintained an important presence and influence in the countries of Latin America, Portugal and Brazil. As King of Spain, he represents Spain in all the Ibero-American Summits, normally calling for the "unity" of the region and the strengthening of relations with Spain and the European Union. In this sense, Spain is also the main contributor to the Ibero-American General Secretariat, headquartered in Madrid. This organization is mainly financed by Spain, with more than 60 per cent of the budget as of 2016. Felipe VI has attended all the summits since he ascended the throne. For the 2021 Ibero-American summit in Andorra la Vella, Felipe became the first Spanish monarch to visit neighbouring Andorra, a principality whose co-prince is the Spanish Bishop of Urgell.

Also, as he did as prince of Asturias, Felipe has kept the tradition of attending the inauguration of Latin American leaders. As of January 2024, he has attended more than 80 presidential inaugurations.

===== Portugal =====
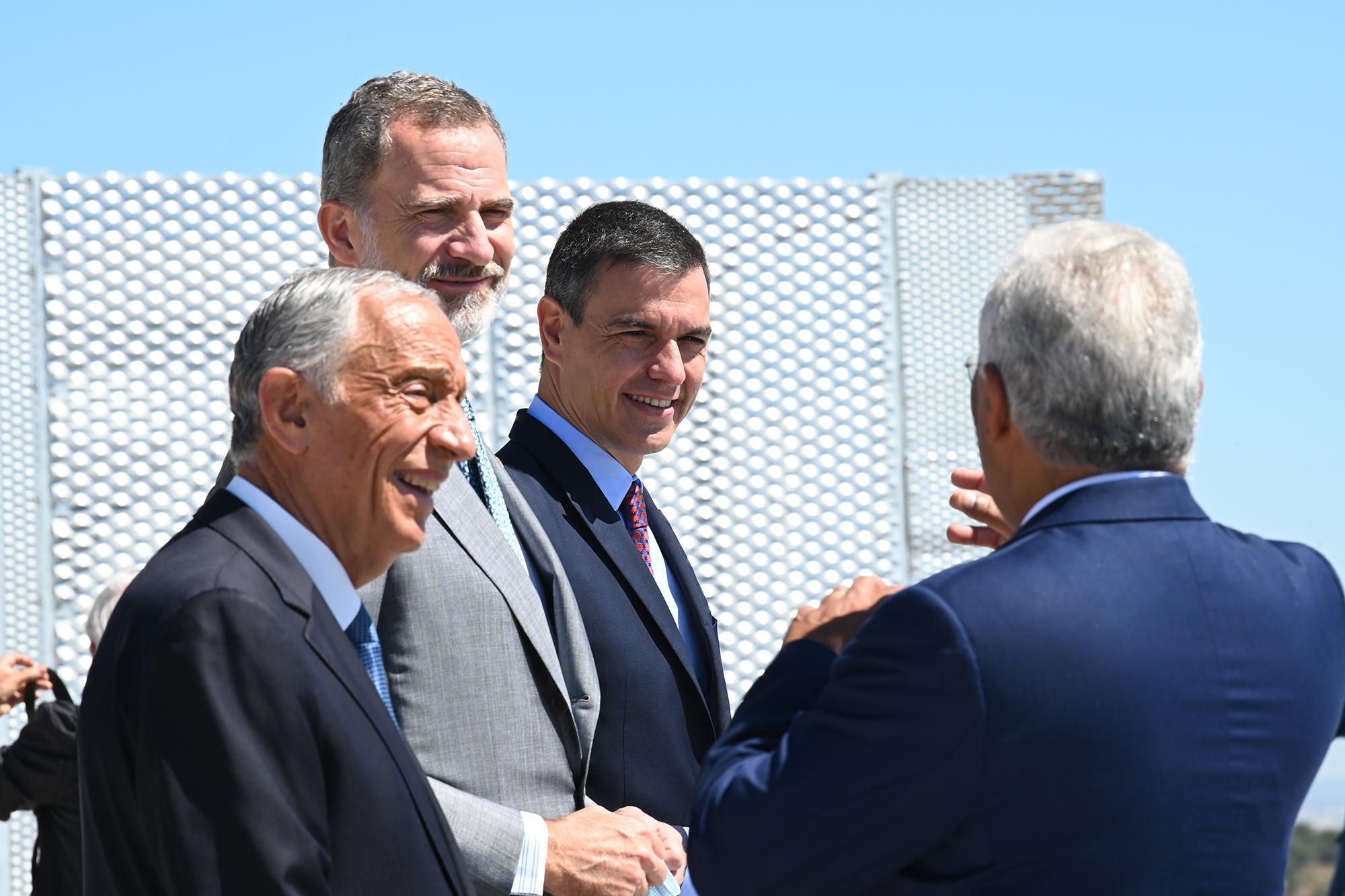
Relaxed talk between the heads of State and Government of Spain and Portugal in July 2020

During the reign of Felipe VI, good relations between Spain and Portugal have continued. After his visit to the Vatican, Felipe dedicated his second foreign visit to Portugal, in July 2015. There, he met with President Aníbal Cavaco Silva and Prime Minister Pedro Passos Coelho, and stated that the relationship between the two countries was "not only the relationship of good neighbors, but of brother countries" and remembered that his grandfather, Infante Juan, Count of Barcelona, chose Portugal to live while in exile. He also made it clear that he intended to keep the good relationship between the neighbor countries.

After the election of Marcelo Rebelo de Sousa as new president of Portugal, he made his first official visit to a foreign country to Spain in March 2016. The king, who had attended the inauguration of Rebelo de Sousa early that month, and the Portuguese leader had established a very good relationship, being described as a true friendship. In addition to courtesy and institutional visits, it was very common to see both leaders in each other's countries as well as attending various events led by the other. Examples of this relationship are the support that the Portuguese president gave to the king when the monarch was awarded with the World Peace & Liberty Award from the World Association of Jurists in 2018, the private visit that Rebelo de Sousa made to Spain in 2020 to visit the Prado Museum, and having a private lunch with the monarch at Zarzuela Palace, and when they were seen eating on a public terrace near the Royal Palace of Madrid in 2021. Also, Rebelo de Sousa welcomed Leonor, Princess of Asturias in Lisbon during her first international trip and also to Infanta Sofía when she moved to the Portuguese capital to study. Rebelo de Sousa made his last international trip as president to Spain on 20 February 2026.

===== Cuba =====
From 11 to 14 November 2019, on the occasion of the 500th anniversary of the founding of the city of Havana by the Spanish, Felipe and Letizia made a state visit to Cuba. This was the fifth royal visit to the island after Infanta Eulalia, Duchess of Galliera in 1893, Infante Alfonso, Count of Covadonga in 1937, Infante Juan, Count of Barcelona in 1948 and King Juan Carlos in 1999. However, King Felipe's visit was the first state visit in history. The visit was harshly criticized by the conservative opposition, as well as by the Cuban opposition and human rights associations which considered the visit a legitimization of the regime.

The Spanish monarchs, who were greeted with cheers by the Cubans, were also welcomed by Cuban president Miguel Díaz-Canel and his wife, Lis Cuesta Peraza. After signing some cooperation agreements and receiving the baton of the city, the royal couple walked through the streets of the Cuban capital and visited monuments and buildings. The next day, King Felipe awarded Eusebio Leal with the Grand Cross of the Order of Charles III, a renowned Cuban historian who already held the grand crosses of the orders of Alfonso X, the Wise and Isabella the Catholic.

To conclude the trip, the monarchs traveled to Santiago de Cuba and visited the Castillo de San Pedro de la Roca, where they paid homage to the fallen in the Cuban War of Independence (1895–1898) and Spanish–American War of 1898.

===== Mexico =====
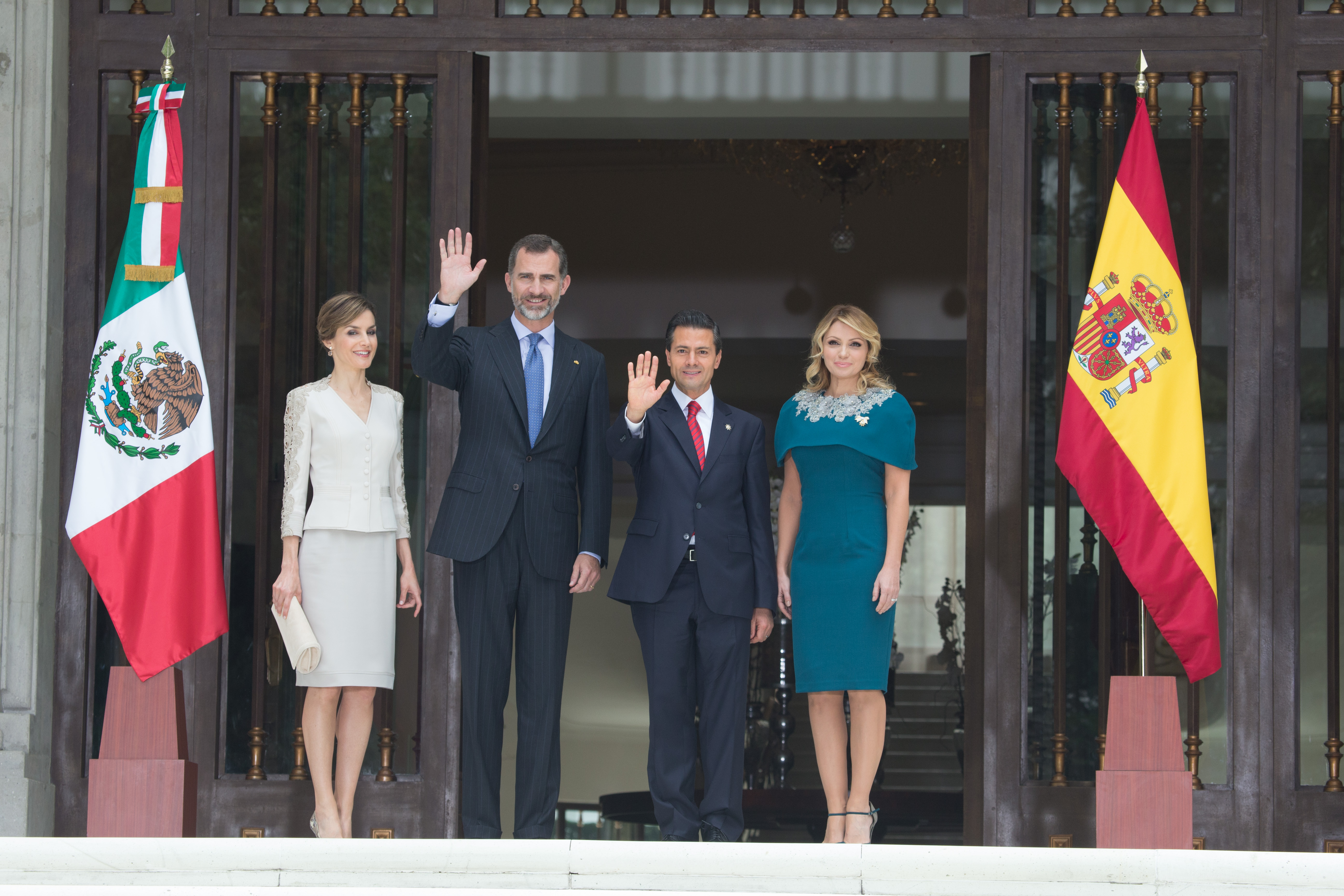
The King and Queen of Spain along with the Mexican president, Enrique Peña Nieto, and his wife

Felipe has had a good relationship with Mexico, coinciding in his first years of reign with president Enrique Peña Nieto, who favored this relationship. Felipe made a state visit to the North American country in 2015. However, things worsened with the rise to power of Andrés Manuel López Obrador. López Obrador was inaugurated as Mexican president in December 2018, an inauguration attended by the King, and from the beginning, the Mexican president expressed disapproval for what Spain and its companies represented.

At the beginning of 2019, the Mexican president asked Felipe VI for an apology on behalf of the Crown and Spain for the events that occurred during the Spanish conquest of the Americas. The Royal Household did not respond to this request, forwarding the letter from the Mexican president to the Government. In a release, the Spanish government "firmly rejected" López Obrador's arguments and encouraged both governments to "work together" to "intensify the already existing relations of friendship and cooperation". This request for an apology and the criticism for not answering has been reiterated by the Mexican president on various occasions between 2020 and 2022.

After this incident, neither the Royal Family nor the King's Household have spoken about the issue or intervened in any way in the relations between Spain and Mexico, leaving it in the hands of the Government.

In 2024, incoming Mexican president Claudia Sheinbaum officially banned Felipe VI from attending her inauguration on 1 October, citing his failure to respond to López Obrador's letter. In response, the Spanish government said that it would boycott the event altogether.

In March 2026, Felipe issued an acknowledgement of "abuses" made by Spanish conquistadors during the colonization of the Americas in remarks made at the National Archaeological Museum in Madrid. He also praised the role of the Crown in trying to prevent them, such as the promulgation of the Laws of the Indies.

==== Gibraltar ====
As King of Spain, Felipe has defended the historic claim of Spain over Gibraltar. In September 2014, he addressed the United Nations General Assembly for the first time and, although he made some reference to the territorial integrity of the states, he did not directly mention Gibraltar.

Two years later, in another speech at the UN General Assembly podium, the king referred to Gibraltar as the "only existing colony in European territory" and he invited the UK to "put an end to this anachronism with a agreed solution between our two countries that restores the territorial integrity of Spain and is beneficial for the population of the colony and Campo de Gibraltar".

The last time the King mentioned the Gibraltar dispute was on his state visit to the United Kingdom.

==== State trip to the UK ====
From 12 to 14 July 2017, the King and Queen of Spain made a state visit to the United Kingdom, which had been postponed twice: the first in March 2016, due to the political crisis in Spain and the second in May 2017, due to the snap general election in Britain.

On Wednesday morning the 12th, Charles, Prince of Wales, and Camilla, Duchess of Cornwall, came to receive the King and Queen. From there, they proceeded to Horse Guards Parade, where they were officially received by Queen Elizabeth II and Prince Philip, Duke of Edinburgh, with military honours and ordnance salutes. The hymns of the two countries were played and the King reviewed the Guard formed there. Next, they moved to Buckingham Palace where they visited the Picture Gallery. In the afternoon Felipe went to the Parliament of the United Kingdom where he addressed a few words at the joint session and held an informal meeting with the leader of the Labour opposition, Jeremy Corbyn. During his speech before parliament, he mentioned the status of Gibraltar, saying that "I am certain that this resolve to overcome our differences will be even greater in the case of Gibraltar, and I am confident that through the necessary dialogue and effort our two governments will be able to work towards arrangements that are acceptable to all involved". In the evening, the State Dinner, hosted by Queen Elizabeth and Prince Philip in honor of the King and Queen of Spain, took place in the Gala Hall of Buckingham Palace.

On Thursday the 13th, there was a Spanish-British business meeting (UK-SPAIN Business Forum) at Mansion House, with the presence of the Mayor of the City of London, Andrew Parmley, and an important business delegation from both countries. Later, the party visited Westminster Abbey accompanied by Prince Harry. There, the King made an offering at the Tomb of the Unknown Warrior. At mid-morning, they went to the Spanish Embassy in London, where they received representatives of the Spanish community in the capital and where, previously, they had held a brief meeting with the families of Ignacio Echeverría and Aysha Frade, murdered in the terrorist attacks in London. Later, the King visited 10 Downing Street, where he had a working lunch with the Prime Minister of the United Kingdom, Theresa May, in which they discussed matters of bilateral interest. Thursday's day was completed with a gala dinner offered by the Mayor of London in honor of the King and Queen, at Guildhall.

On Friday the 14th, Felipe and Letizia were officially bid farewell by Elizabeth and Philip, at the gates of Buckingham Palace. Subsequently, Felipe and Letizia moved to the Francis Crick Institute, a biomedical research center that houses the largest individual biomedical laboratory in Europe. Later they went to Oxford to visit the Weston Library, where they were shown a manuscript of the Codex Mendoza, they saw a copy of a Ptolemy, with the coat of arms of the Catholic Monarchs and an original copy of a first edition of Don Quixote. At noon, Oxford University hosted a luncheon in his honour. To conclude, they held a meeting at Exeter College with representatives of the university's academic community, including professors, postgraduate students and doctoral students linked to Spain.

=== Jews ===
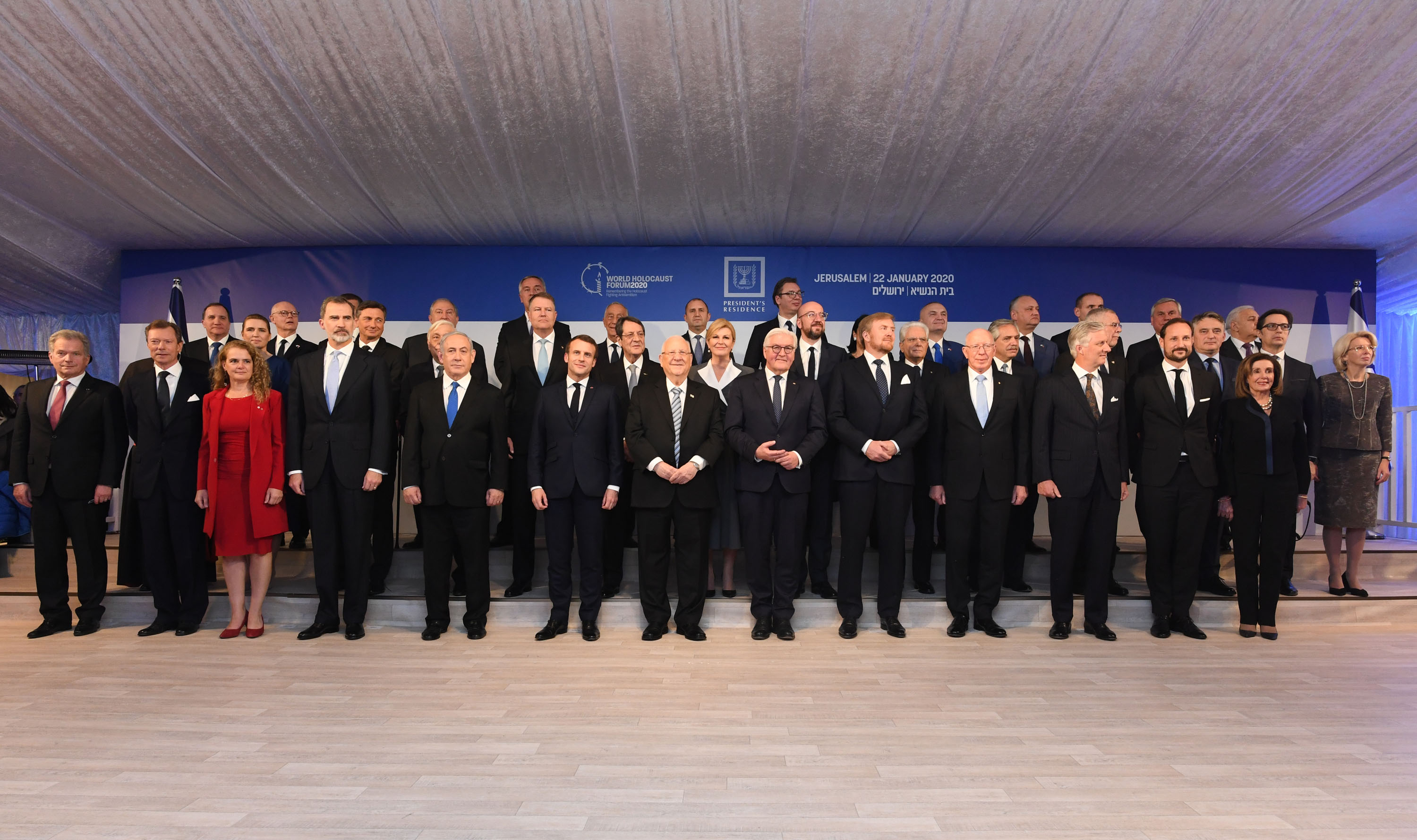
Family photo of the international leaders who attended the Fifth World Holocaust Forum in 2020

Felipe, like his father before him, has supported the initiatives of Spanish institutions to normalize relations with the Jewish people and religion. In 1990, he awarded the Sephardic Jewish communities with the Prince of Asturias Award.

In December 2015, the King hosted a solemn ceremony in the Royal Palace to celebrate the approval by the Cortes Generales and the subsequent sanction by the Sovereign of the law that granted Spanish nationality to the Sephardic Jews expelled from Spain in 1492 due to the Alhambra Decree. At his speech, Felipe thanked the Sephardic Jews for preserving their language, Ladino, and for teaching their own children "to love this Spanish homeland". He also welcomed them "back home", adding that they had "returned home forever." The Jewish associations thanked the gesture, declaring that they were no longer "Spaniards without a homeland."

In January 2020, the King attended the Fifth World Holocaust Forum at Jerusalem. Felipe, who claims the title of King of Jerusalem as one of the historic titles of the Spanish crown, was the only international leader to speak at the opening dinner. In his speech, he stated that "there is no room for indifference in the face of racism, xenophobia, hatred and antisemitism" and that "forgetting the Holocaust would be extremely dangerous and an utter disrespect to the memory of the victims."

On 9 October 2023, King Felipe condemned "with all firmness" the Hamas-led attack on Israel, called for "doing everything possible to avoid greater suffering, destruction, hopelessness and the loss of more human lives" and affirmed that Spain "remains faithful to its commitment to peace and stability in the region". Later that month, during the 2023 Princess of Asturias Awards ceremony, Felipe referred to the ongoing conflict asking for unity to resolve it and recalled that in 1994, Israeli prime minister Yitzhak Rabin and Palestinian leader Yasser Arafat received the Prince of Asturias Award for International Cooperation for their "effort to create conditions of peace in the region" after the Madrid Conference of 1991 and the 1994 Oslo I Accord. On 11 January 2024, the King, in a meeting with the diplomatic corps in Spain, called for the release of war hostages and defended the "establishment of the Palestinian State next to Israel" to stop the "cycle of violence".

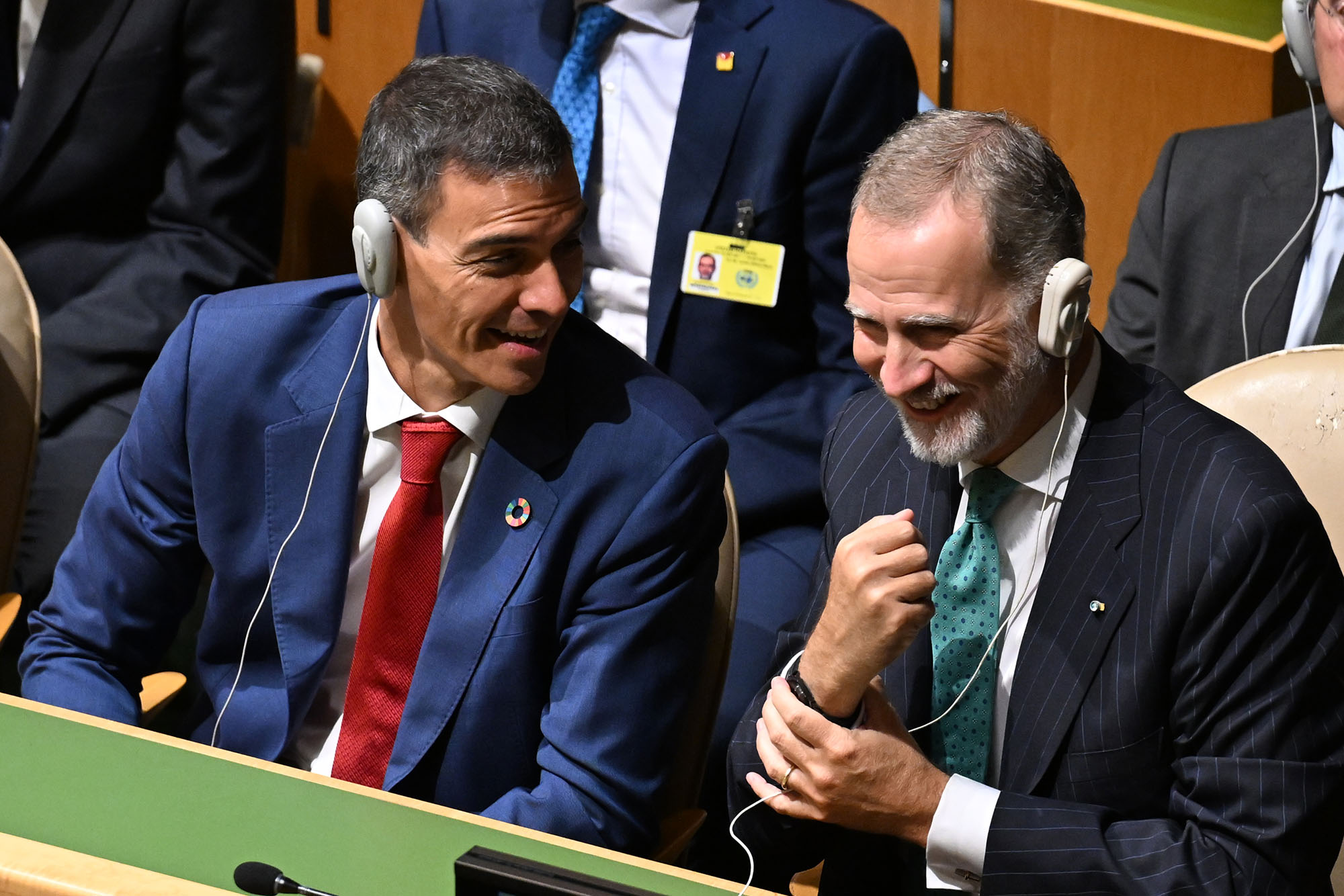
King Felipe and prime minister Pedro Sánchez talking during the 80th session of the UNGA

During his State Visit to Egypt, King Felipe criticized the "unbearable" humanitarian crisis in the Gaza Strip, which "has caused unspeakable suffering of hundreds of thousands of innocent people" and supported a "viable Palestinian state that coexists in peace and security with Israel". The Palestinian state would be formed by "Gaza, the West Bank and East Jerusalem". He defended a similar position during his speech at the general debate of the eightieth session of the United Nations General Assembly, asking for the "massacre" to be stopped and pushed for the two-state solution.

== Honours and awards ==
In 2019, as King, Felipe received the World Peace & Liberty Award from the World Jurist Association at the World Law Congress in Madrid. Felipe VI holds the Guinness World Record for being the tallest reigning monarch in the world, standing at 1.97 metres (6 ft 5½ in).

== Titles, styles and arms ==
Royal monogram of King Felipe VI

=== Titles and styles ===
Juan Carlos became King in late November 1975, but no title was conferred on Felipe as heir apparent until 1977, when he was made Prince of Asturias, the traditional title normally held by the heir to the Spanish throne. The royal decree granting him this title also entitled him to use "the other historical titles corresponding to the heir of the Crown". Felipe started using the Aragonese title of Prince of Girona publicly on 21 April 1990, during a trip around Aragon, Catalonia and Valencia, becoming the first Bourbon to use this title.

Upon ascending the throne, Felipe assumed the same titles held by his father. If the former Kingdoms of Aragon and Navarre had separate naming styles, he would also be known as Felipe V of Aragon and Felipe VIII of Navarre along with Felipe VI of Castile.

=== Arms ===
Felipe's arms as heir to the throne (left) and as king (right)

As heir to the Spanish throne, Felipe's arms were the Spanish coat of arms with a label of three points azure (blue). The first quarter represents Castile, the second León, the third Aragon, and the fourth Navarre; below are the arms of Granada. In the centre, on an inescutcheon, were the ancestral arms of the sovereign House of Bourbon-Anjou. Surrounding the shield was the collar of the Order of the Golden Fleece and surmounting it was the heraldic crown of the heir to the throne, decorated with four half-arches.

Following his accession to the throne, the label on his arms was removed and the crown of the heir was changed to that of the monarch's (eight half-arches instead of four). These arms differ from those of his father's as king, as they omit the Cross of Burgundy, the yoke, and the sheaf of five arrows.

== See also ==
- Line of succession to the Spanish throne
- List of honours of the Spanish royal family by country
- List of state visits received by Felipe VI
- List of titles and honors of the Spanish Crown
- Princess of Asturias Awards

== Notes ==
Felipe VI House of Bourbon Cadet branch of the Capetian dynasty Born: 30 January 1968
Regnal titles
Preceded by Juan Carlos I	King of Spain; 2014–present	Incumbent; Heir presumptive: Leonor, Princess of Asturias
Spanish royalty
Vacant Title last held by Alfonso of Bourbon	Prince of Asturias; Prince of Viana; 1977–2014	Succeeded by Leonor of Bourbon
Vacant Title last held by Charles of Austria	Prince of Girona, Duke of Montblanc, Count of Cervera, Lord of Balaguer; 1990–2014	Succeeded by Leonor of Bourbon
Olympic Games
Preceded by Infanta Cristina	Flagbearer for Spain; 1992	Succeeded by Luis Doreste
