= Abdication of Juan Carlos I =

2014 abdication of the King of Spain

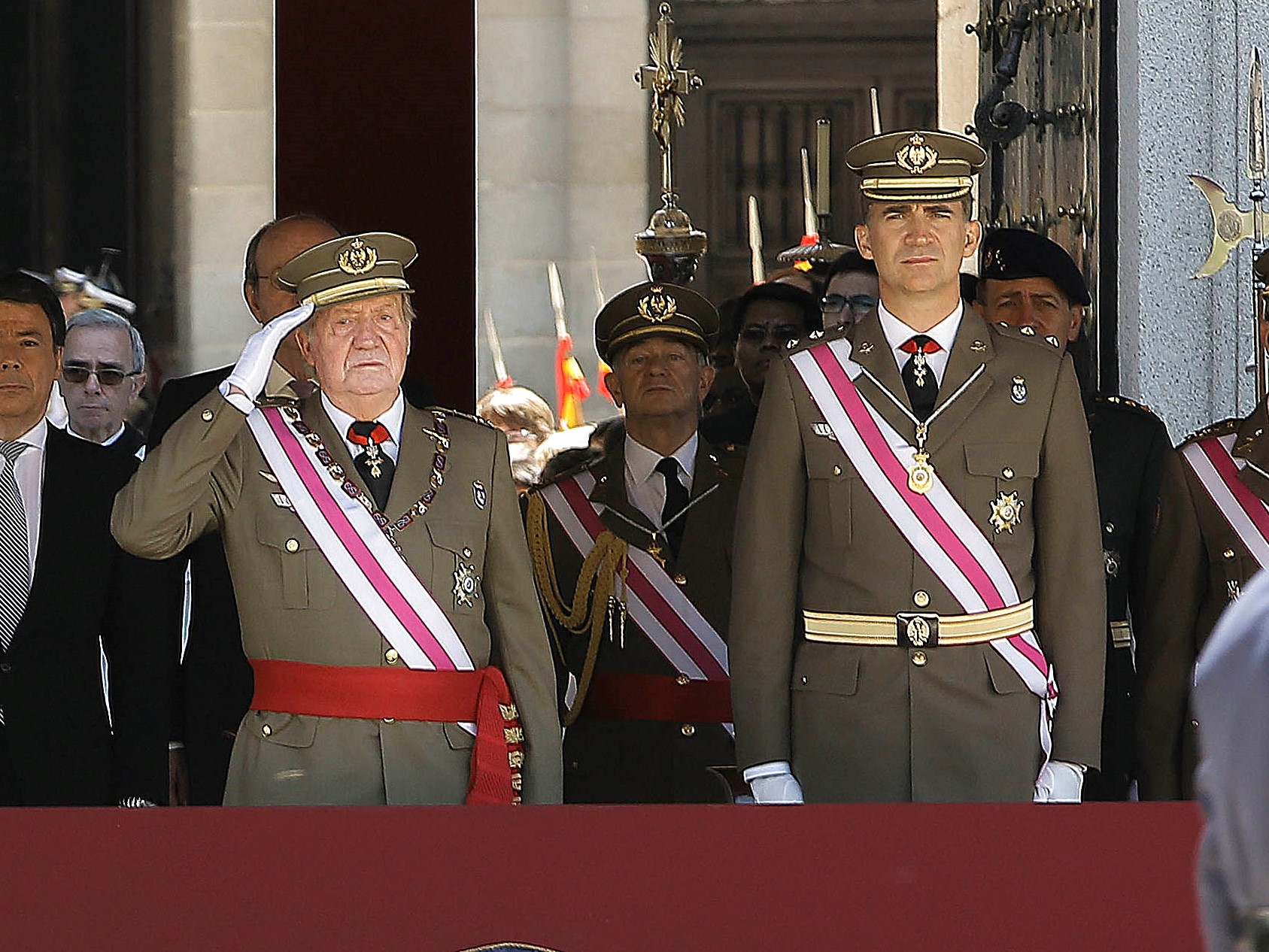
- Juan Carlos I (left) and Felipe (right) on 3 June 2014, the day after the former announced his abdication
- Participants: King Juan Carlos I Felipe, Prince of Asturias; Government of Mariano Rajoy
- Outcome: Juan Carlos I abdicated on 19 June 2014 and Felipe became monarch as Felipe VI

King Juan Carlos I of Spain announced his pending abdication from the throne on 2 June 2014. An organic law permitting the abdication, required by the 1978 Constitution in its article 57.5, was drafted by the government and approved by the Cortes Generales, and was formally signed on 18 June during a ceremony in the Hall of Columns of the Royal Palace of Madrid. The abdication became effective when it was published in the Official State Gazette at midnight on 19 June.

The Prince of Asturias, Felipe de Borbón y Grecia, succeeded the throne under the name Felipe VI on the abdication of his father. Juan Carlos retained the title of king emeritus with ceremonial functions entrusted to him by Felipe.

== Background ==
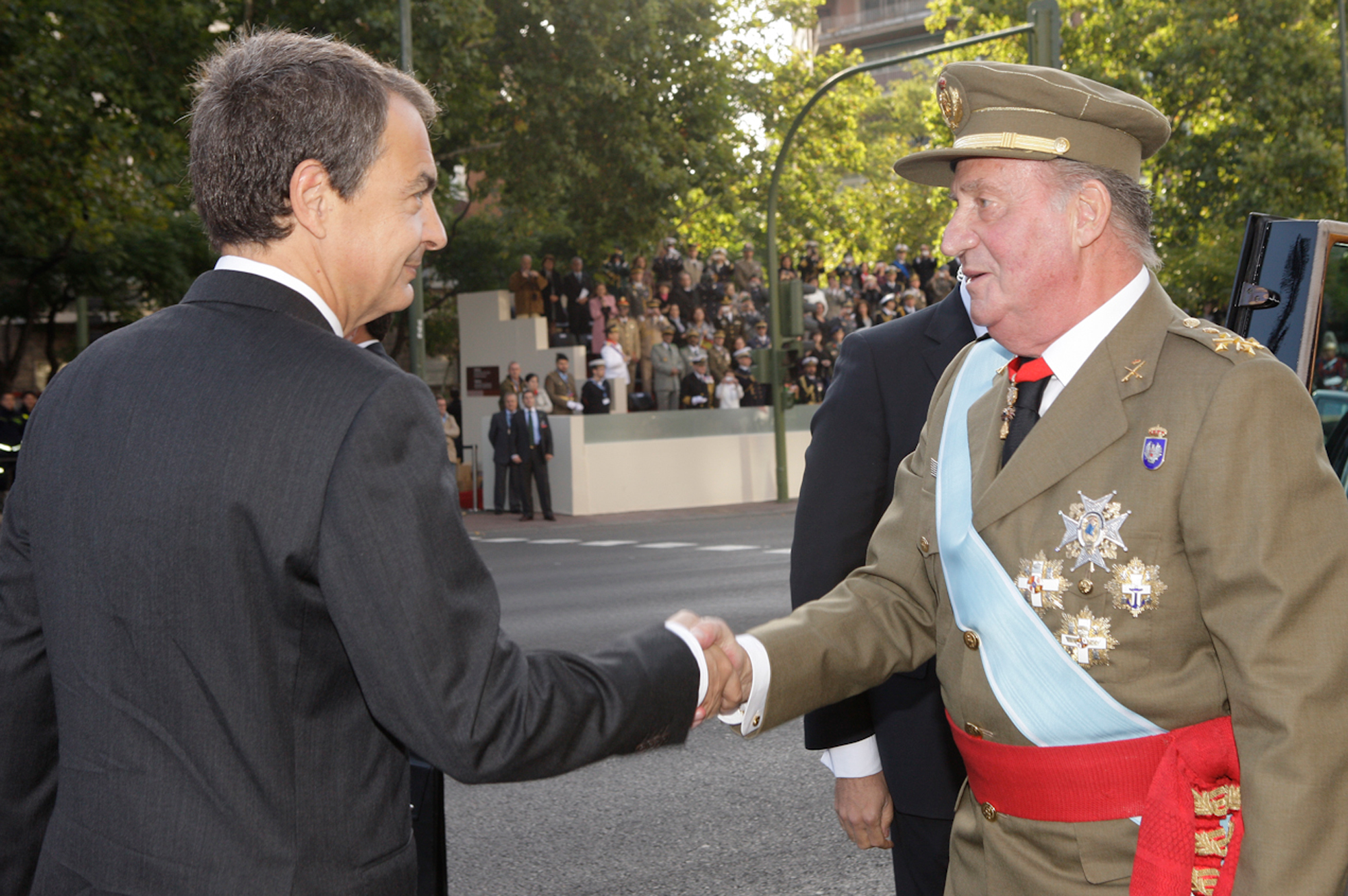
Prime Minister José Luis Rodríguez Zapatero greets King Juan Carlos I in October 2010.

In 2010, the medical team at the Royal Household detected a nodule in one of the King's lungs that could be cancerous. The news caused concern for the monarch's health at all levels of the country and raised the question of his continuity as head of state. In order to study the possibility of establishing a regency in those first months of the year, Juan Carlos himself and Felipe González met with then Prime Minister José Luis Rodríguez Zapatero, and with President of the Congress of Deputies José Bono. Finally, on 8 May, surgeons at the Hospital Clínic de Barcelona removed the tumor. The subsequent biopsy determined that it was benign and the discussion on the matter of the succession was put on hold.

From 2011 onwards, the King's public image began to deteriorate significantly due to the Nóos corruption case, in which his daughter, Infanta Cristina de Borbón, was implicated.

In April 2012, Juan Carlos suffered an accidental injury during a secret elephant-hunting trip in Botswana, which led to him being flown back home in a special aircraft. The trip, which cost roughly €40,000, had been paid for privately by a businessman, Mohammed Eyad Kayali. It led to a political scandal in the midst of an economic crisis in Spain, with the risk premium at historic highs, and the country on the verge of being intervened. In addition, the incident brought to light the lucrative private business that the monarch had been conducting for years with the Saudi oligarchy.

Despite the scandal, the king continued to feel protected by the political class. Only Madrid socialist Tomás Gómez had spoken publicly about the possibility of his abdication.

Meanwhile, the king's health problems followed one after the other. Since the accident in Africa, Juan Carlos had undergone several surgeries to try to alleviate his mobility problems: the first one in November 2012 on his left hip joint; then in March 2013, a herniated disc repair surgery; and in September 2013, the second operation on his left hip.

The first person to learn of the king's concerns was Félix Sanz Roldán, director of the National Intelligence Centre (CNI) and a personal friend of the king. On 19 November 2012 and in the presence of Sanz Roldán, Juan Carlos informed Rafael Spottorno, the Private Secretary to the King, that he was considering the possibility of abdicating the throne. The king set a symbolic date—5 January 2014—on occasion of his 76th birthday, that is, still 15 months to go. Ten days later, Spottorno called his two predecessors, Fernando Almansa and Alberto Aza, to a meeting in which the four of them began to study the many legal and political issues, and also those of a personal nature for the king himself, related to the drafting of the future law. This is because the Constitution merely dictated, in article 57.5, that any doubt would have to be resolved by an organic law and approved by the Congress of Deputies by absolute majority. The Constitution did not specify whether the role of Congress was to authorize or to sanction, whether it would have to accept the decision made by the king, if he had to submit to the approval of Congress, or if, in short, the politicians could prevent him from abdicating. Among the personal issues, it was a matter of determining, among other things, if Juan Carlos could continue to reside or not in Zarzuela Palace.

In any case, the greatest fear of "the fantastic four" (as they came to be known colloquially around the palace) was that the political forces that were not in favor of the monarchy would "take advantage" of this law to "open the can of worms" about the form of the State. Given the doubts and the diversity of opinions among them, the king's men (among whom was also General Domingo Martínez Palomo as Head of the Planning and Coordination Cabinet) decided to ask for help from the former president of the Congress of Deputies, former minister of justice, and permanent advisor to the Council of State, Landelino Lavilla, one of the jurists who had contributed the most to establishing the legal foundation for the Transition. Lavilla studied the matter and reached a preliminary conclusion: the law should be very brief so as not to stir a debate in Congress.

During the deliberations, another thorny issue arose concerning dynastic rights within the royal family itself, as those in favor of Felipe being the undisputed successor faced a dilemma: on one hand, it was essential to develop and approve the organic law required by the Constitution, which would make unavoidable the pending reform of that same article 57 to abolish the prevalence of men over women in the succession to the throne. On the other hand, this issue would have to be addressed after Felipe became king because, otherwise, those who would be able to claim their rights would be the Infantas, Elena and Cristina. As if that were not enough, there was also the issue of immunity. Would it have to be resolved in the same organic law? In the end, it was decided that it was not convenient to risk the proclamation of the future king to shield the previous one, but that the priority was to get Parliament to approve the abdication without any problems and then, in a second organic law, "go for the immunity. Prime Minister Mariano Rajoy summarized it at the time as "a mess".

Throughout 2013, the small group continued to work on the matter, but Spottorno was not sure that His Majesty's decision was firm. He knew that, in spite of the disrepute into which his reign had fallen and the pressures to step aside, Juan Carlos maintained that "kings only leave when they die," that he, who had sacrificed his childhood and youth to one day be King of Spain, would "die with his crown on."

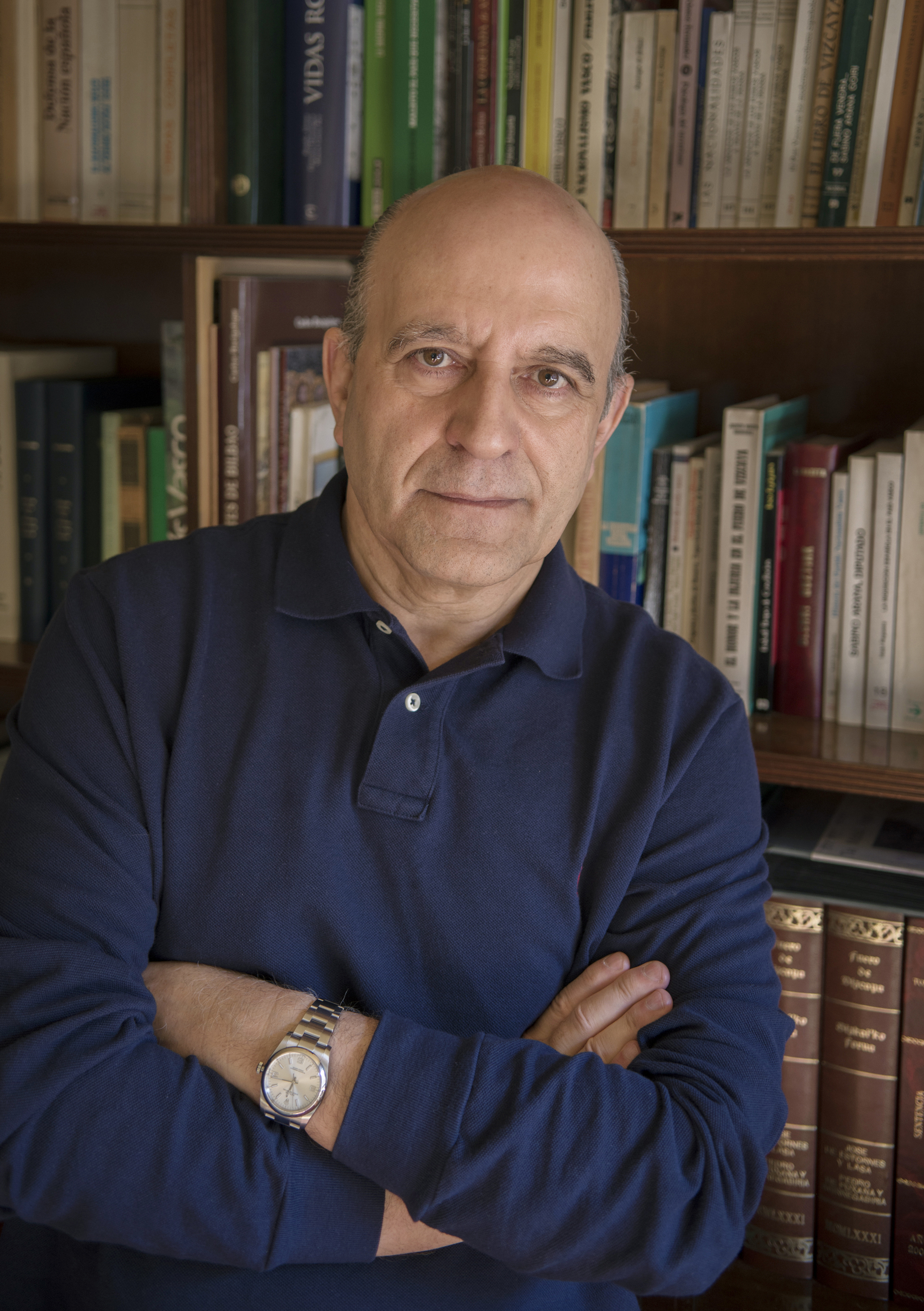
Journalist José Antonio Zarzalejos in 2014.

In spite of the precautions, in February 2013, a source with access to the king's inner circle disclosed to writer and journalist José Antonio Zarzalejos that the monarch, overwhelmed by his difficult family situation and by the damage done to his public reputation, as well as his own physical health, was considering renouncing the throne. To verify the information, Zarzalejos met with the head of the Royal Household, who did not deny it. Thus, on 22 February, he published an article in El Confidencial under the title El rey baraja ya la abdicación (The king is already considering abdication). Juan Carlos, annoyed at the indiscretion and despite being aware of its veracity, ordered these claims to be refuted. (Note: Looking back, Zarzalejos suspects that he was used as the battering ram of a "simulation operation" set up by the head of the Royal Household so that the idea of the King's abdication would start to enter people's minds. Thus, in light of what happened afterwards, he reflects, his article should have been titled El entorno del rey baraja ya la abdicación (The king's entourage is already considering abdication), instead of El rey baraja ya la abdicación (The king is already considering abdication).)

=== Personal matters ===
Juan Carlos I, married to Sofía of Greece but separated from her for more than 40 years, was determined to divorce her and then marry his mistress at the time, Corinna Larsen—27 years his junior—but to keep the throne, as Edward VIII had tried to do in 1936 when he married American socialite Wallis Simpson. According to someone close to the king, the German-Danish businesswoman and Juan Carlos were preparing everything they needed to start a new life together. Included in that plan were the millionaire commission from the Arabs, the duplex in the Swiss Alps, and the luxury apartment in the exclusive London neighborhood of Belgravia.

In 2012, the king made available to Corinna, in the form of an "absolute gift", the 65 million euros he had received four years earlier. The money had been transferred from the Mirabaud banking group to an account in Gonet bank in the name of shell company Solare, based in Nassau, Bahamas. Larsen was the sole beneficiary of that account. The date on the donation document had been handwritten, which made one suspect that it had been drafted without that piece of information, "in anticipation of [needing] to submit it to the judicial authorities with the most convenient [date] for her defense if an investigation were to be launched. The beneficiary's lawyers argued that it was "an unsolicited gift" from Juan Carlos as a donation to her and her son, with whom he "had become attached."

Juan Carlos continued to search for a residence in which to live with Corinna, either in the ward of El Pardo (Madrid) or in Eaton Square (London). The Sultan of Oman, Qaboos bin Said Al Said, offered to serve as host. In 2014, just two weeks after the king's abdication, the sultan would gift Juan Carlos a penthouse in London valued at 62.7 million euros. Meanwhile, Mohammed VI of Morocco offered him a large estate near Marrakesh where he could build a palace. But CNI director Félix Sanz Roldán flatly refused: "The king of Spain cannot, under any circumstance, not even after having abdicated, spend long periods of time in non-Western countries with a woman who is not his wife." Thus, the King's longing started to fade due to the influence exerted by two of the people who had the most direct and open access to him: former President Felipe González and Sanz Roldán himself. It was within that environment of trust and openness with the monarch when a veteran advisor was heard telling the king: "Juan, tú eliges: o Corinna o Corona" (Juan, you choose: either Corinna or the Crown).

=== Ill-fated speech ===
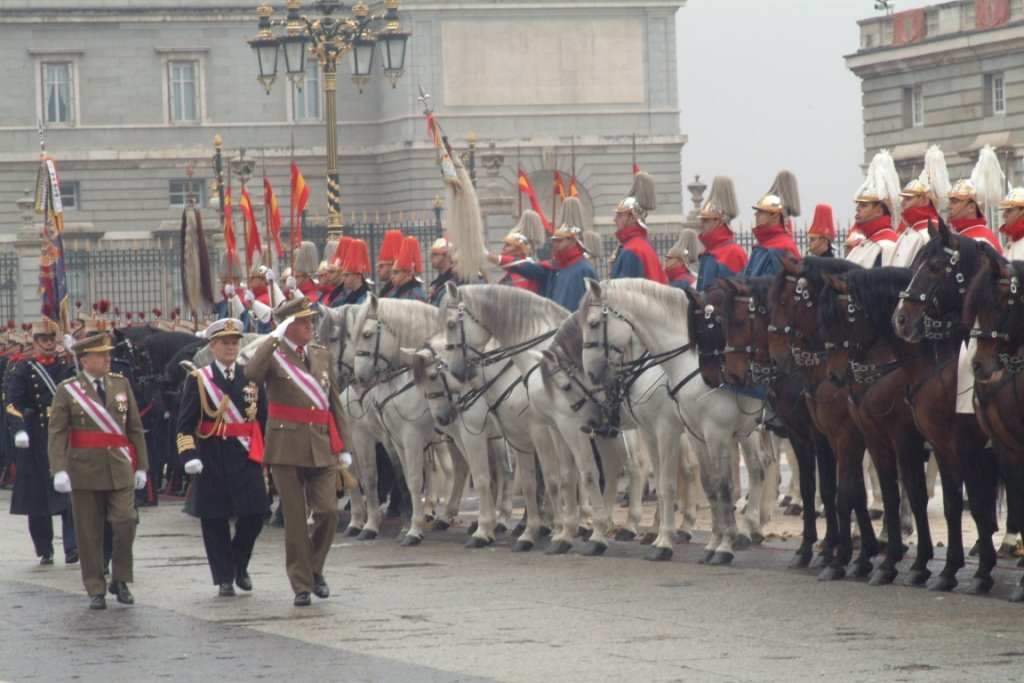
King Juan Carlos I inspecting the troops during the Pascua Militar of 2009.

The most reliable versions define Monday, 6 January 2014, as the point of no return towards the end of the reign of Juan Carlos I. As every year, the Pascua Militar event was being celebrated. Both the Army military leadership itself, as well as the media and the general public, harbored doubts about the real physical capabilities of the monarch to reliably assume the responsibilities of the highest state institution.

The formal ceremony started first thing in the morning. That year, the inspection of the troops had been excluded from the ceremony to prevent the king from experiencing any physical discomfort. The speech, however, was unavoidable. Thus, past one o'clock in the afternoon, Juan Carlos approached the lectern and, after the usual greetings, began his speech. The audience immediately realized the difficulties that the speaker was going through. The captain general of the Army, rather than delivering a speech, was "stumbling" over the written words. As journalist Álvaro de Cózar said, Juan Carlos "trips over the words; stutters on every period, on every comma." The head of the Press and Communications Office of the Royal Household, Javier Ayuso, was so distressed—because, in addition, the ceremony was being broadcast live on radio and television throughout the country—that he suffered a fainting fit and had to be discreetly removed from the room. Finally, after skipping entire paragraphs and "with pitiful embarrassment," Juan Carlos ended his speech.

The press, social media, and subsequent publications referred harshly to the distressing episode: "two agonizing minutes, a moment of national embarrassment;" "a dreadful moment of collective shame and chagrin." Moreover, the monarch projected a "pitiful" image before the army leadership, the group to which he felt most united by vocation and affection.

In the following days, it became known that the king, ignoring the warnings of his advisors about the transcendence and imminence of the event, had flown the previous week to London to celebrate his birthday with his "de facto family" (his lover, Corinna Larsen; his friend and Corinna's first husband Philip Adkins; and her son, Alexander), as well as with Mohammed Eyad Kayali, representative of the Royal House of Saudi Arabia in Spain and a close friend of the king. The party lasted until late on Sunday, the 5 January, when it was already completely dark in the English city. When the time came for the return flight home, the thick fog that covered London caused the take-off to be delayed until well into the early hours of Monday morning. Juan Carlos barely slept that night.

=== First months of 2014 ===
Just one day after the speech, on Tuesday, 7 January 2014, the Infanta Cristina was charged by Judge José Castro Aragón, but it was not until late February when Spottorno received the order to implement his decision.

The task force had grown: Spottorno, Ayuso, Lavilla, the former heads of the Royal Household, and the prince himself were joined by Deputy Prime Minister Soraya Sáenz de Santamaría and Under Secretary of the Presidency Jaime Pérez Renovales. Although there were lively discussions on the final form that the law should take, in the end the theory proposed by Lavilla prevailed, which Ayuso would put into words as follows: "Do not put things that require a debate in Congress; only this, so that there will be no discussion: 'the king abdicates in his son's favor;' but nothing more."

In March 2014, Juan Carlos notified his son Felipe on the 26th, and Prime Minister Mariano Rajoy on the 31st, about his impending plans to abdicate. In turn, former Prime Minister José María Aznar told his right-hand man Javier Zarzalejos in late May. The risk of leaks hastened the events and thus it was decided to move up the date to 2 June.

=== Last official function ===
The commemorative event to mark the 250th anniversary of the Segovia Artillery Academy, held in the Alcázar of Segovia on 16 May 2014, was presided over by Juan Carlos as his last official engagement before the announcement of his abdication.

== Timeline ==
=== Initial announcement by Prime Minister Mariano Rajoy ===
On 2 June, around 9:30 a.m., the Office of the Prime Minister summoned all journalists in charge of covering governmental information. The urgent announcement called for an institutional statement by Prime Minister Mariano Rajoy at around 10:30 a.m. at the Palace of Moncloa. Due to the surprising nature of the announcement, initial speculations pointed to a governmental crisis caused by the results of the European elections; however, this possibility was soon dismissed. At 10 a.m., Zarzalejos published in digital newspaper El Confidencial an article titled El rey abdica para salvar a la Monarquía de la crisis institucional (The King abdicates to save the Monarchy from an institutional crisis). Minutes before the statement was scheduled, several media outlets implied it would deal with the abdication of the monarch.

At 10.30 a.m., the prime minister announced Juan Carlos's intention to renounce the throne and abdicate in his son's favor.

His Majesty King Juan Carlos has just communicated to me his will to renounce the throne and launch the succession process. The reasons that have led the King to make this decision are something that His Majesty wishes to communicate personally to all Spaniards this very morning.

— Mariano Rajoy

=== Statement by King Juan Carlos I ===
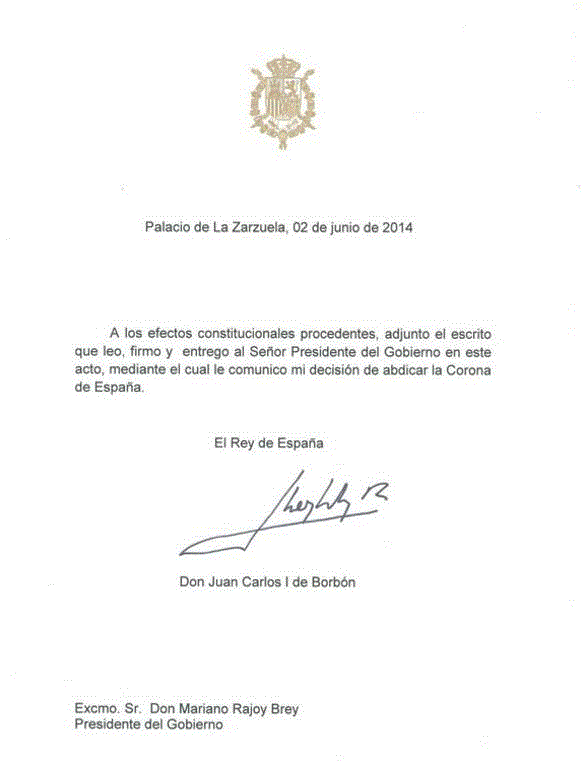
Letter of abdication addressed to the President of Government.

Shortly after the prime minister's statement, the Royal Household shared on Twitter the letter by which the King formalized his decision.

The recording at the palace of Juan Carlos's abdication announcement had to be repeated twice due to mistakes he had made, and thus its broadcast was delayed until 13:05. In the speech, which lasted six minutes, Juan Carlos recalled his accession in 1975 and reviewed his work as head of state during the previous 39 years. The speech began with these words:

I come to you this morning with this message to tell you, overcome by emotion, of an important decision and the reasons that moved me to make it. Guided by the conviction of having rendered the best service to the Spanish people and having recovered physically and resumed my institutional activities, I have decided to put an end to my reign and abdicate the Crown of Spain, so that the Government and the Cortes Generales can give effect to the succession in accordance with the Constitution.

— King Juan Carlos I

He also stated that he had made the decision to abdicate the Crown in January 2014 after his 76th birthday and that, once he had recovered physically, he had decided to inform the prime minister.

Referring to the economic situation in Spain and the transformations and renovations demanded by society, he acknowledged that these should be carried out by the new generations and that his son, Felipe de Borbón, already had the necessary preparation and maturity to take over as head of state. Juan Carlos concluded by thanking the people of Spain, all the representatives of the state institutions, and the Queen for their support and loyalty.

Meanwhile, Corinna Larsen, who was staying at The Mark hotel in New York City, received a personal message from the king, to which she reacted with "a mixture of displeasure and contempt".

He has just made the biggest mistake of his life. He has signed his death warrant. He will spend the rest of his days in a golden cage.

— Corinna Larsen

=== Creation of draft law ===
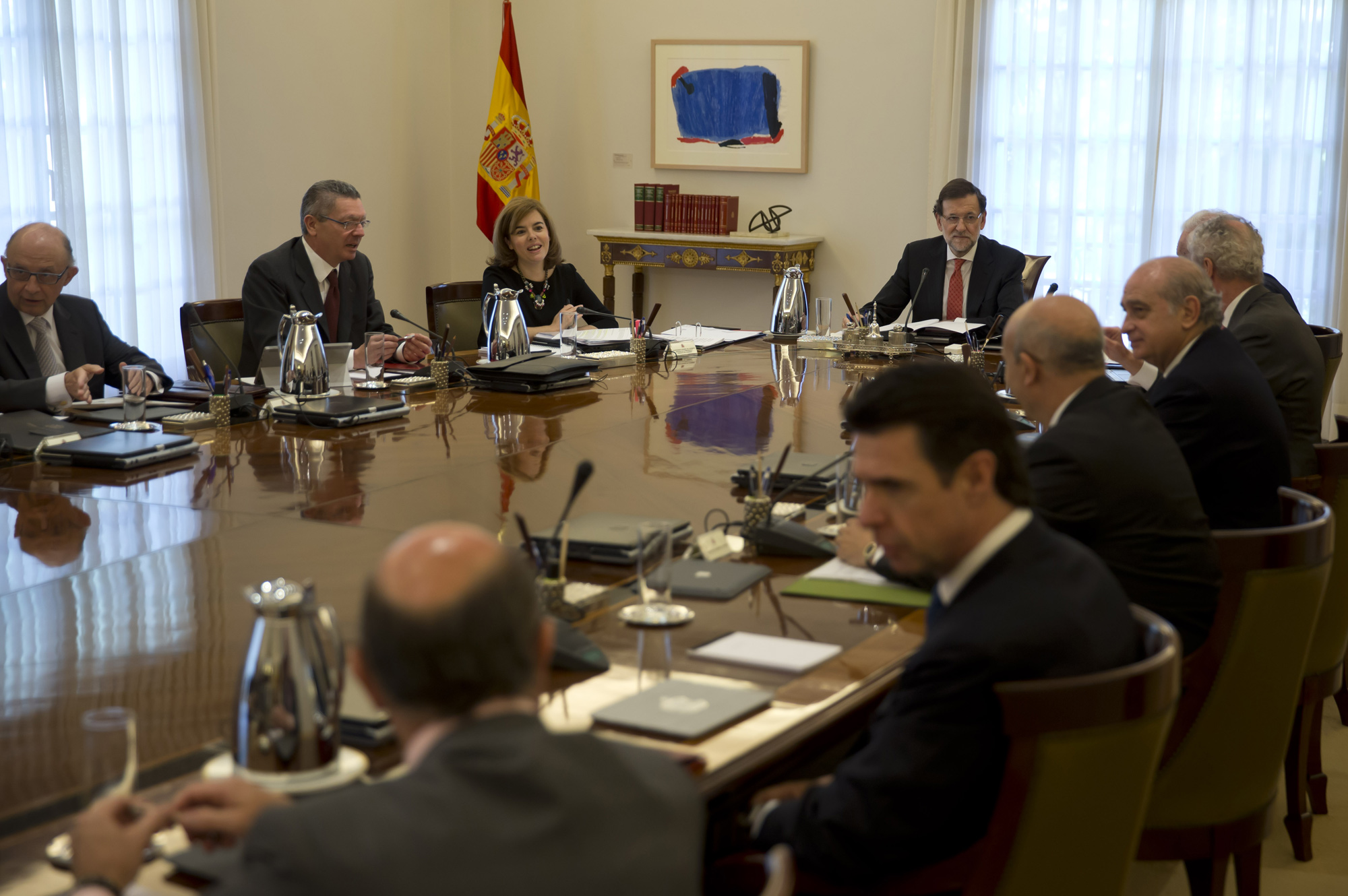
Special meeting of the Council of Ministers of Spain on 3 June 2014, in which the draft organic law on the abdication was approved.

In his statement, Rajoy had announced the convening of a special meeting of the Council of Ministers, which was indeed held on 3 June, and which approved the submission to the Cortes Generales of the draft organic law, thus making effective the abdication. According to Article 57.5 of the Spanish Constitution, "abdications and renunciations and any doubt, de facto or de jure, occurring in the order of succession to the Crown shall be resolved by an organic law."

Finally, the draft organic law that was approved consisted of a single article and a single final provision, as follows:

Sole article. Abdication of H.M. King Juan Carlos I of Spain.

1. H.M. King Juan Carlos I abdicates the Crown of Spain.

2. The abdication shall become effective at the moment this Organic Law enters into force.

Sole final provision. Entry into force.

The present Law shall enter into force at the moment of its publication in the Official State Gazette.

Moreover, the Council of Ministers approved an Agreement requesting an urgent procedure for its processing in Parliament.

=== Final activities of King Juan Carlos I ===
Between 3 and 8 June, Juan Carlos concluded his antepenultimate week on the Spanish throne. On 4 June, several members of the business sector honored Juan Carlos in a ceremony at the Royal Palace of El Pardo. The same day he presided over the traditional Charity bullfight from the Royal Box at Las Ventas bullfighting ring. It was the last time the king presided over this event once his abdication of the crown was announced. On 6 June, former Prime Minister José María Aznar bade him farewell in a column for The Wall Street Journal. On Sunday, 8 June, he bade farewell to the Armed Forces as commander-in-chief, with the presence of his Royal Guard, the Army, the Air and Space Force, the Navy, and the Civil Guard.

The following day, he received President of Mexico Enrique Peña Nieto, to whom he awarded the Collar of the Order of Isabella the Catholic. On 12 June, Juan Carlos received from Adolfo Suárez Illana the Collar of the Order of the Golden Fleece, awarded posthumously to his father, former Prime Minister Adolfo Suárez González. On the same day, he held his last meeting with Joaquín Gay de Montellá Ferrer-Vidal, the president of the Catalan employers' association National Labor Development.

=== Approval of the draft organic law in Congress ===
==== Rift in the PSOE ====
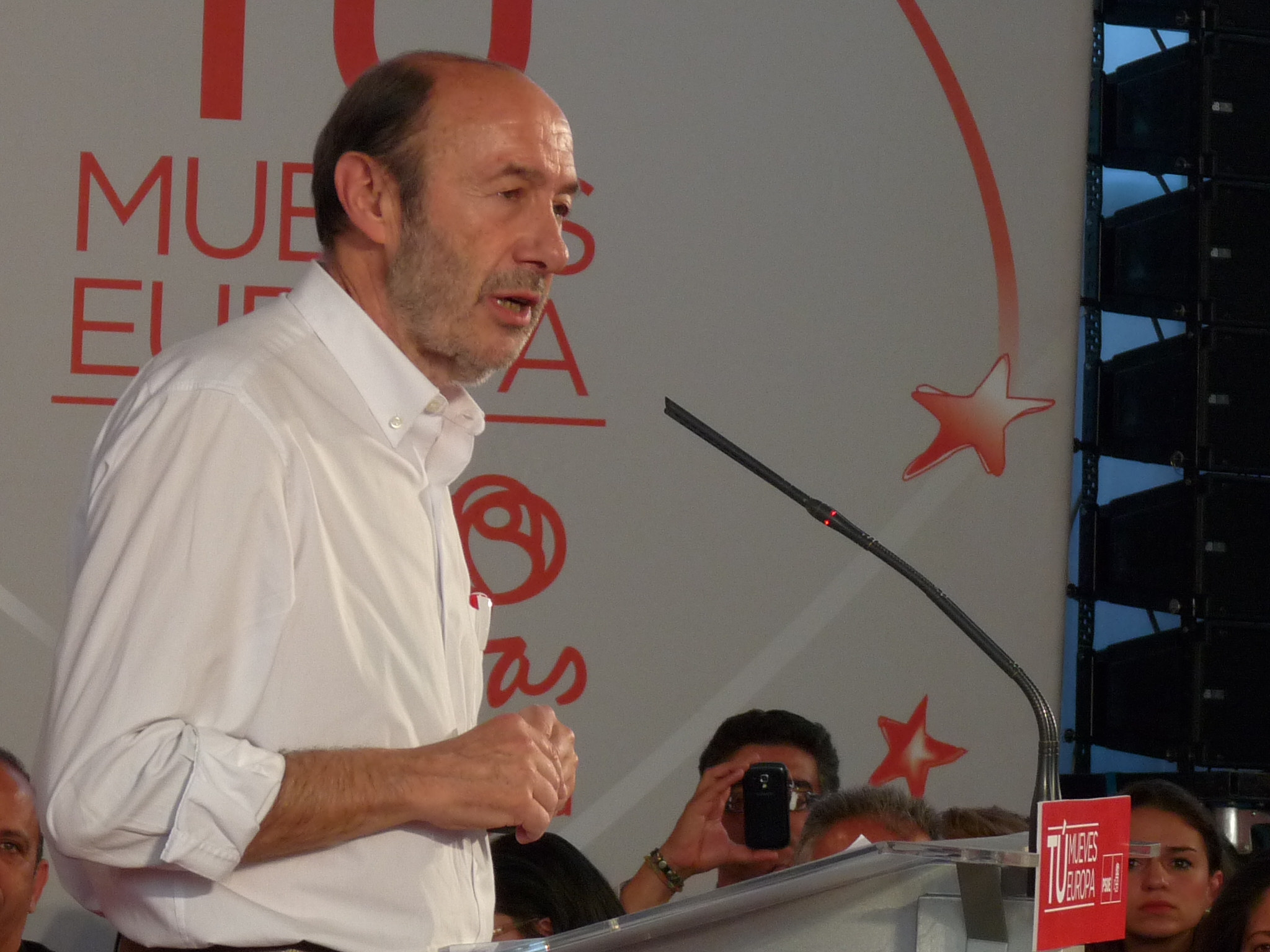
Alfredo Pérez Rubalcaba at a PSOE campaign event for the 2014 European Parliament elections.

In order for the law to be approved by an absolute majority, support from the socialists was key. The then leader of the opposition, Alfredo Pérez Rubalcaba, played a decisive role. Rubalcaba, who had served as minister of education, minister of the interior, government spokesperson, and deputy prime minister in successive PSOE governments, had forged a close friendship with Juan Carlos I dating back to 1992, when both presided over numerous events and competitions during the Olympic Games in Barcelona.

In the spring of 2014, Juan Carlos asked the veteran politician for help in getting his group to support the law that would guarantee dynastic continuity. The request came at a very bad time for the secretary general, who in those days was going through his most difficult period as the leader of the main opposition party. But, putting his own interests behind those of the monarch, he replied: "Sir, if that is your decision, you can count on me. It is not ideal for me, but I will not leave without having settled the matter." And indeed, he remained at the head of the party even after the electoral results of the European Parliament elections, which meant a significant decline in support from left-wing voters. In an interview recorded shortly before his death, in 2019, he recalled it thusly: "I resigned the day after the European elections; [but] I did not resign and leave, which is what I could have done, what Joaquín Almunia did: you resign, appoint a management committee, and leave. No, I resigned and stayed, and I called on a congress for the following month."

To try and convince the most reluctant deputies and regional leaders to vote "yes", Rubalcaba appealed to the "constitutional consensus", which he placed above even the foundational "deep republican roots" of the party.

Even in spite of his attempts, many parliamentarians continued to align themselves with the theories of other left-wing parties and insisted that the final approval of the law could be conditioned to an either prior or simultaneous public consultation. From United Left, Alberto Garzón summed up the internal debates and tensions of those days as follows:

Nothing prevented that law from including a referendum before it. I mean, you can make a law that says "Yes, this is going to be like this, as long as in the referendum that I put forward, citizens say that they do want this." Then, within the PSOE there was a major rift: many deputies were saying in private that they would support the referendum and that we should keep pushing.

— Alberto Garzón

In that context, Odón Elorza, a Basque socialist deputy and former mayor of San Sebastián, sent to the leadership of the Socialist Group a letter in which he asked for an in-depth internal debate or, in any case, that those parliamentarians who so requested it, be granted the freedom to vote "for reasons of republican conscience." The secretary general refused.

==== Holding of the plenary session and voting ====
On Wednesday, 11 June, the Plenary of the Congress of Deputies debated the draft organic law that would make the abdication effective.

The plenary session began with an agreement for the direct processing and single reading of the draft bill submitted by the government. The draft bill was presented by Prime Minister Mariano Rajoy and the debate continued with the participation of the representatives of the various parliamentary groups.

After all the speeches, then came the vote for the amendments to the whole text of the bill. Some of them (Plural Left and part of the Mixed Group advocated for holding a referendum to decide on the form of the State, and others (Galician Nationalist Bloc and Republican Left of Catalonia) added to this demand the recognition of the right to self-determination of the various state territories. All initiatives were rejected.

The vote took place then via roll call, whereby each of the parliamentarians had to state their position on the document out loud as they were called. During the vote, some deputies expressed their support for the Republic and others for an independent Catalan republic.

Of the 350 deputies who made up the chamber, 341 expressed their vote, since two deputies from PSOE did not appear due to their disagreement with the leadership and the seven from Amaiur were absent from the plenary session as a sign of protest. There were 299 deputies in favor and 19 against, while 23 of them abstained. One of these abstentions was that of the former mayor of San Sebastián, Odón Elorza, who refused to follow the party line.

Once approved, the document was sent directly to the Senate.

=== Approval of the bill in the Senate ===
The Organic Law that regulated the abdication of King Juan Carlos received the approval of the Senate on Tuesday, 17 June. The debate, in which the senators representing the different Parliamentary Groups took part, began with the proposals of veto of the law presented by United Left, Republican Left of Catalonia, and Initiative for Catalonia Greens. This was followed by the debate of the text as a whole by the spokespersons of the various groups.

The parliamentary session ended with the vote on the veto proposals, which were rejected, and the approval of the draft Organic Law with 233 votes in favor, five against, and 20 abstentions out of a possible 266.

With the completion of this procedure, the Organic Law was deemed to have been approved by the Cortes Generales.

=== Sanction and promulgation of the organic law on abdication ===
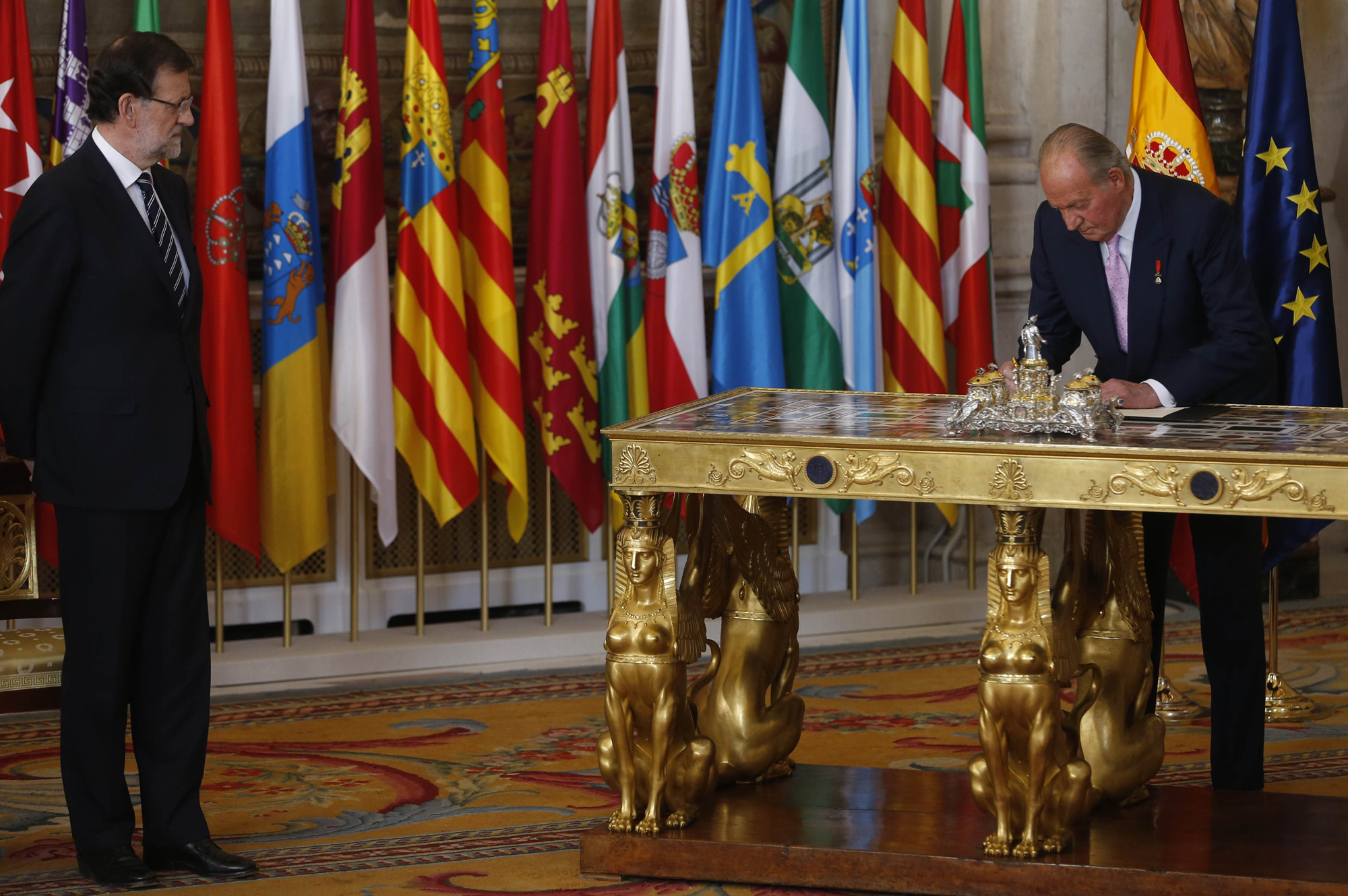
Juan Carlos I signing the organic law on abdication.

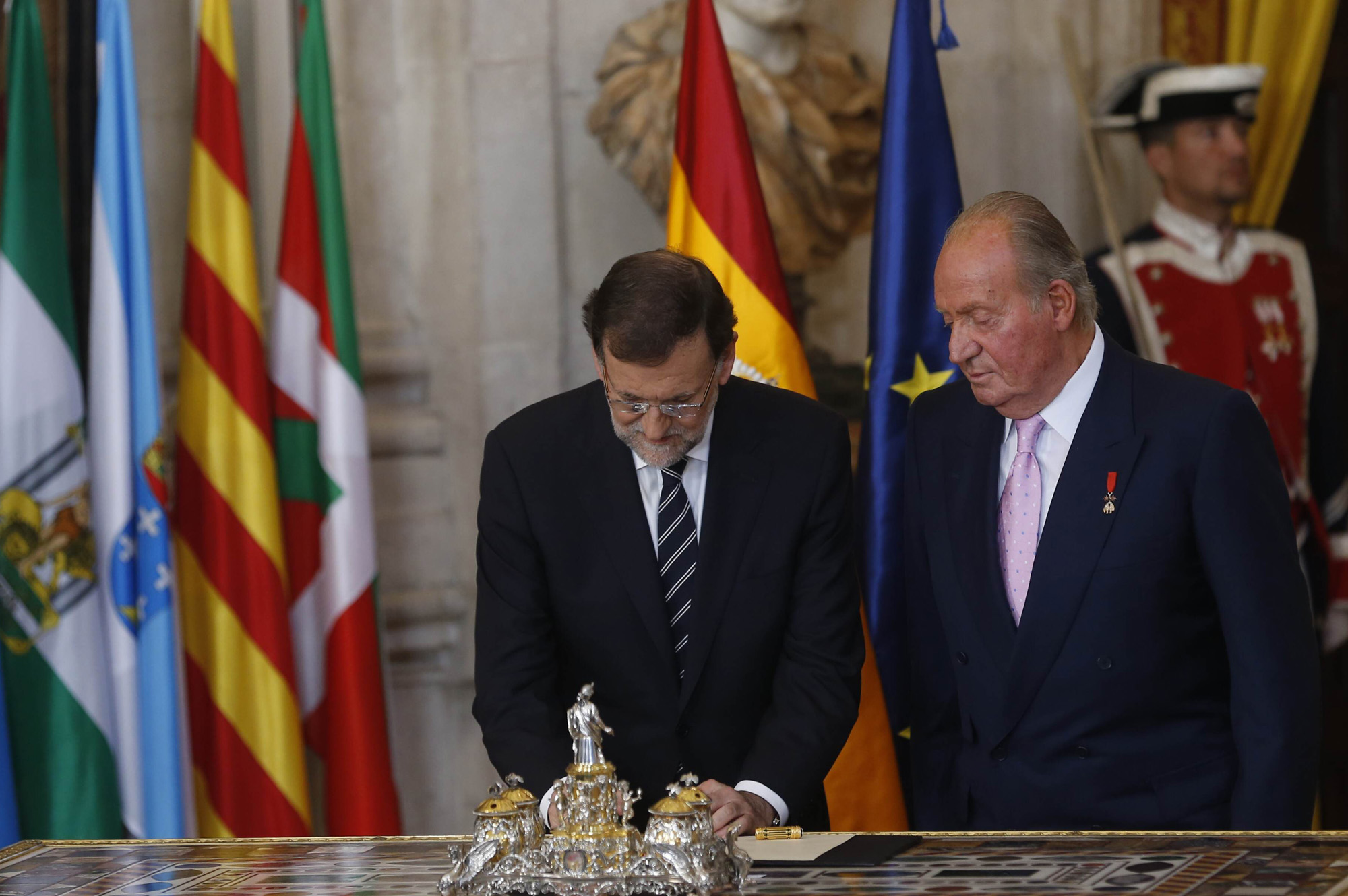
Mariano Rajoy countersigning the sanction and promulgation of the law.

The sanction and promulgation of Organic Law 3/2014 of 18 June, by which the abdication of King Juan Carlos I was made effective, took place during a solemn ceremony at the Royal Palace of Madrid. The ceremony, although short, was witnessed by a considerable number of guests, among whom were the presidents of the high state institutions, members of government, former prime ministers, and some notable political figures. Also present were some members of the Royal Family, such as King Juan Carlos and Queen Sofía; the Prince and Princess of Asturias, Felipe and Letizia; and the Infantas Leonor, Sofía, and Elena. Also in attendance were the King's sisters, Infanta Pilar and Infanta Margarita, the Infante Carlos and his wife Princess Anne, the King and Queen of Greece Constantine and Anne Marie, and the eldest grandson of the King and Queen of Spain, Felipe.

The ceremony began with the reading of the text of the Organic Law by Under Secretary of the Presidency Jaime Pérez Renovales. Next, Juan Carlos I signed the contents of the law, a power conveyed to him by Article 91 of the Constitution of Spain (CE). Afterwards, Prime Minister Mariano Rajoy signed the text, given that by constitutional mandate (art. 56.3 CE) the acts of the King are not valid if they do not receive the endorsement of the head of the government, as established in article 64 of the Constitution. With this act, the Law was promulgated, and its publication ordered.

After King Juan Carlos finished signing the document, he addressed his son Felipe and gave him his seat as a symbol of succession.

=== Publication and proclamation of Felipe VI ===
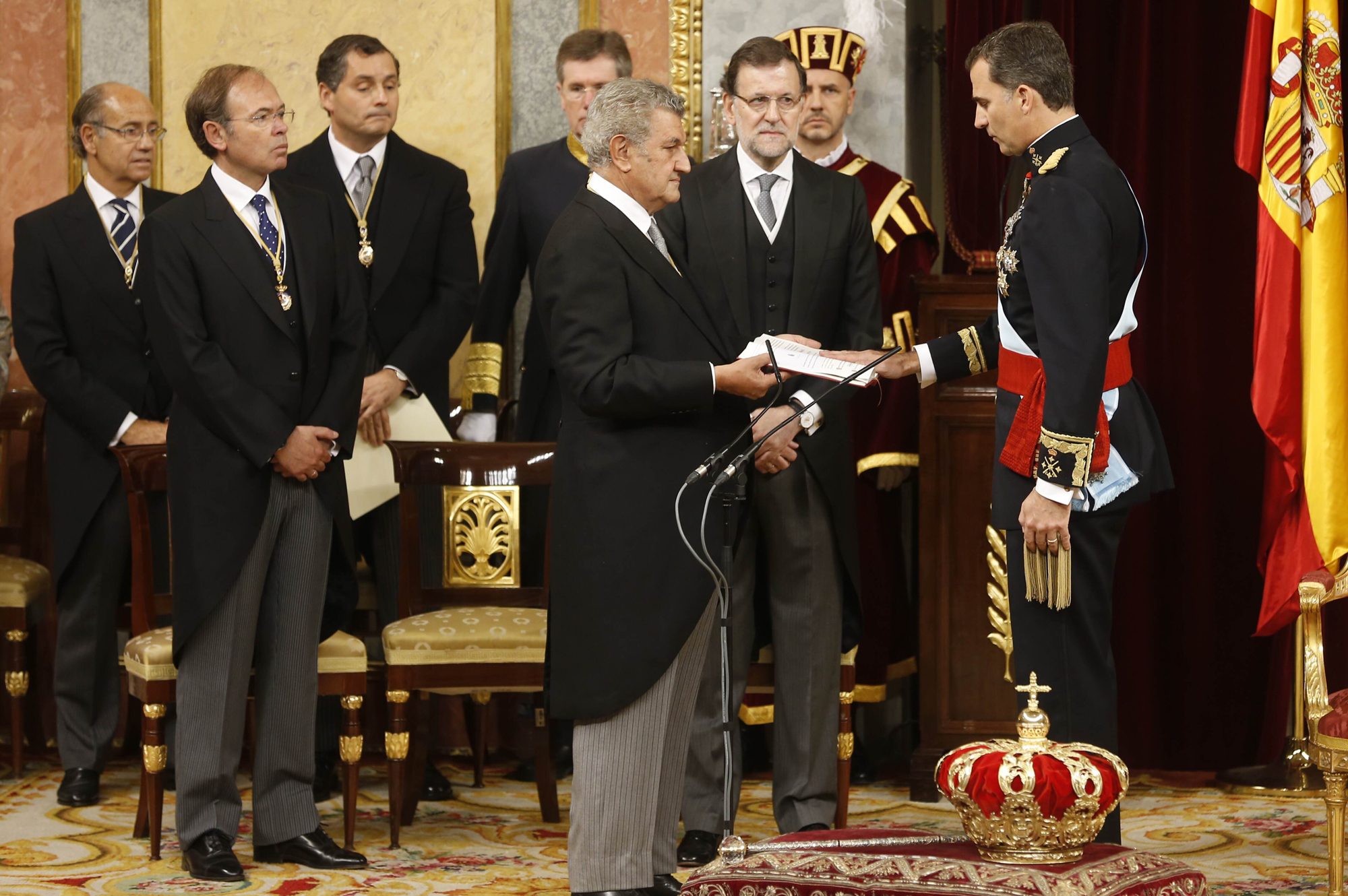
Felipe VI is sworn in before the Cortes Generales.

The law was published in the Official State Gazette at midnight on Thursday, 19 June 2014, at which time its contents and the abdication of Juan Carlos from the Crown became effective. Consequently, his firstborn son Felipe became the new King of Spain, in accordance with Article 57.1 of the Spanish Constitution. His eldest daughter, Leonor de Borbón, became Princess of Asturias and heiress presumptive and, at the age of eight, the youngest direct heir in Europe as the first in the line of succession to the throne.

Felipe's proclamation as king took place at the morning of 19 June. Juan Carlos did not attend his son's proclamation. According to a spokesperson for the royal household, the decision was made in order to "give more prominence to the new king."

=== Express immunity ===
At the beginning of June, the last issue (and one of the most important) of Spottorno's roadmap was addressed: Juan Carlos's legal protection after having lost his sovereign immunity. Deputy Prime Minister Soraya Sáenz de Santamaría had had the idea of including the new legal status of the outgoing king within a law that was already in force, in order to be able to move it forward without problems. The State bureaucracy got down to work and, so as to make the move more effective, gave it a name that was as long as it was vague: Ley Orgánica 4/2014, de 11 de julio, complementaria de la Ley de racionalización del sector público y otras medidas de reforma administrativa por la que se modifica la Ley Orgánica 6/1985, de 1 de julio, del Poder Judicial (Organic Law 4/2014 of 11 July, supplementary to the Law for the streamlining of the public sector and other measures of administrative reform by which Organic Law 6/1985 of 1 July 1985 of the Judiciary is amended). Two amendments included in that obscure law for the streamlining of the public sector would henceforth protect Juan Carlos I under the cloak of the Supreme Court. Although it only received the support of the People's Party, the law was approved and arrived in time for the paternity lawsuits by Albert Solà and Ingrid Sartiau—which had been filed in various ordinary Spanish courts a while back—to be shelved definitively.

This same legal instrument would henceforth also protect the two queens, Sofía and Letizia, and the heiress, the Princess of Asturias.

== Reactions ==
=== Movement in favor of a citizen consultation on the form of the State ===
As an immediate reaction to the abdication message, there were numerous public demonstrations in several Spanish cities in favor of a consultation of the Spanish people on their preferred model of State. Political party Podemos, which had just had remarkable success in the European Parliament elections, issued a communiqué calling for a referendum to decide on the model of State, a pact that would definitively recognize Spaniards "as citizens and not as subjects." In addition to Podemos, other republican-leaning political parties, such as United Left and EQUO, publicly called for the convening of a referendum. Along the same lines, some internal currents of the Spanish Socialist Workers' Party, such as Socialist Left, took the same position.

Also on that day, those same political parties, as well as social movements opposed to the monarchy, called on rallies in dozens of Spanish cities to demand a constituent process. All of them took place "without incident" and in a "festive atmosphere", according to El Mundo. Those in attendance waved the tricolor flag and chanted slogans such as España, mañana, será republicana (Spain, tomorrow, will be republican), Felipe, querido, nadie te ha elegido (Felipe, dear, nobody elected you), or Los borbones, a las elecciones (The Bourbons, to the elections) (and, also, Los borbones, a los tiburones [The Bourbons, to the sharks]). They demanded "a real transition without a king."

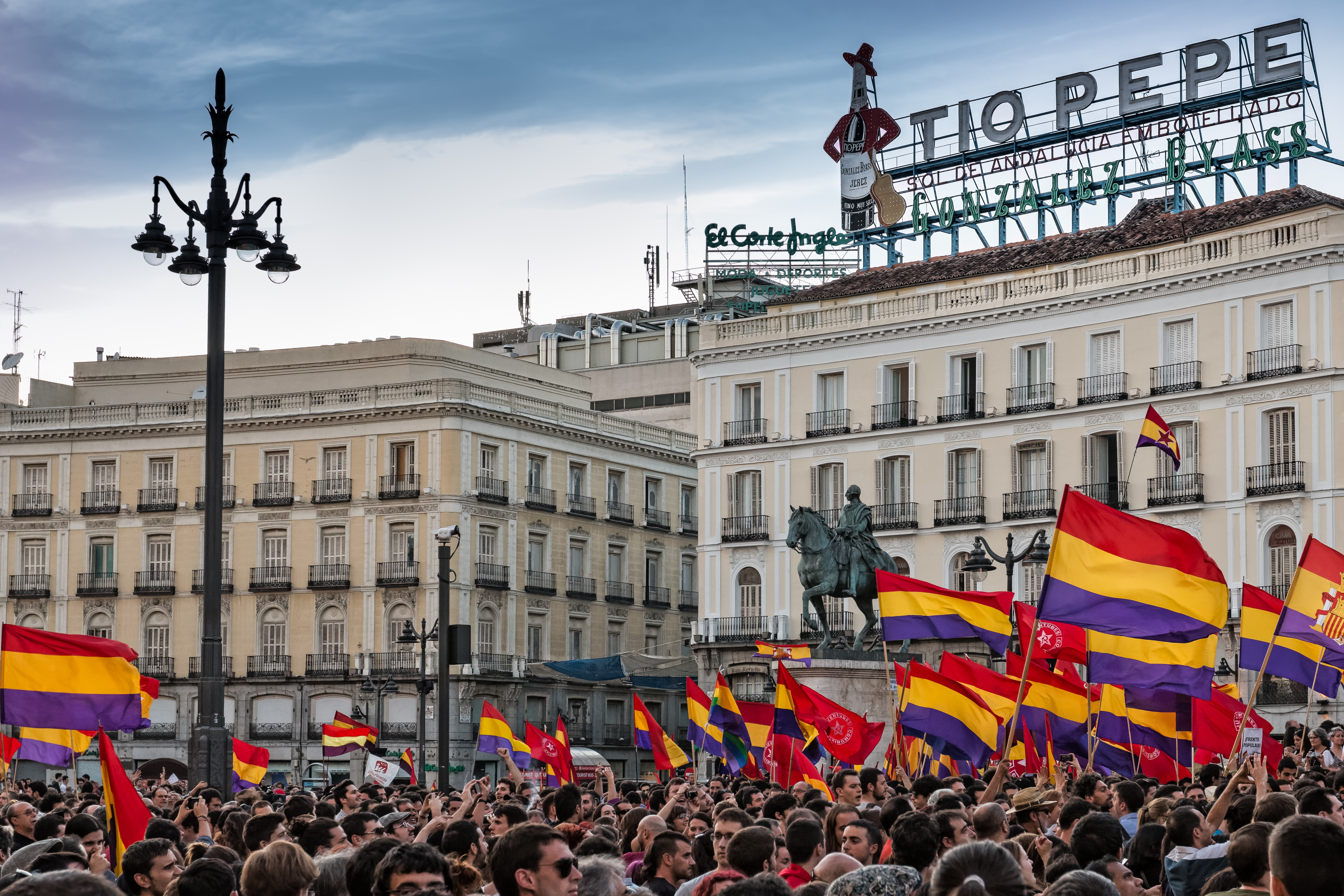
Demonstration on 2 June at the Puerta del Sol in Madrid.

The republican demonstration in Madrid, which took place in the Puerta del Sol, gathered between 10,000 and 20,000 people, according to El País. Around 5,000 people gathered at the Plaça de Catalunya in Barcelona. Republican Left of Catalonia, one of the organizing parties, called on all Catalans in favor of an independent Catalan Republic to go out to the squares of their respective town halls and support the secession. Valencia and Alicante were also the scene of demonstrations.

In Galicia, rallies took place in several cities, called, among others, by the Galician Nationalist Bloc and Nós–Unidade Popular, both in favor of Galician independence. The largest of these rallies was in Vigo. During the demonstrations, there were flags and chants in favor of an independent Galician Republic. A rally was also held in Zaragoza, with close to 2,000 people in attendance. In Andalusia, the main demonstrations took place in Seville and Granada. The constitutional flag in the square was replaced by a republican flag in this latter city. In total, more than 60 rallies were held throughout the national territory.

On Saturday, 7 June, demonstrations were held once again in more than 40 Spanish cities. This time, attendance was much lower.

Outside Spain, demonstrations were held in other European capitals such as Paris and Brussels, and the press echoed the situation in Spain. Thus, The New York Times reported on the petition that a Spanish broker living in London, Helena Fernández de Bobadilla, had made through a signature collection platform. The question sought to determine whether Spaniards wanted "another king" or "no king".

=== Pro-monarchy demonstrations ===
Supporters of the monarchy as a model of state also called for demonstrations to be held on 6 June in various parts of Spain, such as Madrid and Seville. The latter gathered around 200 people.

=== Social networks ===
One hour after the announcement, the abdication occupied the top ten trending topics in Spain on social network Twitter. Hashtags such as #ElReyAbdica (The King abdicates), #VivaElRey (Long live the King), #FelipeVI, #ReyFelipeVI (King Felipe VI), #JuanCarlos, #ElRey (The King), #Borbones, or #IIIRepública (Third Republic) were at the top of the list.

=== Satirical magazines ===
Several cartoonists from satirical magazine El Jueves resigned after accusing magazine owner Grupo RBA of self-censorship. According to the cartoonists, the magazine's publisher refused both to illustrate the cover with drawings of the Royal Household and to mention topics related to the monarchy. They accused the company of destroying 60,000 copies that had already been printed with a cover referring to the abdication to replace them with others with a different subject matter. Official sources of the magazine denied this accusation, stating literally that the published cover "was the one planned and on Monday an attempt was made to change it," and that "it was not possible due to time, because we could not wait any longer and we had to go to print," claiming that "we have not been taken hostage and the matter of the abdication is mentioned on the inside pages," and specifying that the publication of the magazine had even been delayed "because new pages had been added on the abdication." On 18 June, the day before Felipe VI's proclamation, these cartoonists published a special digital comic on the occasion called Orgullo y satisfacción.

=== Polls ===
Meanwhile, a poll conducted by polling company Metroscopia for newspaper El País revealed that, although Prince Felipe de Borbón enjoys a higher approval rating than King Juan Carlos, having obtained a score of 7.3 out of 10, most Spaniards (62%) wish that at some point a consultation is called on to decide on the form of state. The same poll revealed that the majority of those interviewed, almost 50%, would be in favor of the continuity of the monarchy embodied in Felipe VI, as opposed to 36% who would be against it.

Another poll carried out by La Sexta revealed that 53.1% of Spaniards are in favor of the continuity of the monarchy, compared to 36% who are in favor of the republic. Likewise, 63.1% are in favor of Prince Felipe inheriting the crown, compared to 32% who are against. A poll carried out by newspaper El Mundo shows that the abdication has improved the Crown's image, going from 49.9% of support to 55.7% in favor of the continuity of the monarchical institution. Likewise, the poll shows an increased support of the Crown among the voters of the various political parties: going from 77.7% to 80.3% among People's Party voters, from 45.2% to 52.7% among PSOE voters, and from 14.1% to 22.6% among United Left voters.

A poll conducted by TNS Demoscopia for Antena 3 reveals that two out of three citizens believe that the abdication has taken place at an opportune moment, and 60% support the proclamation of Prince Felipe as the new king.

Spaniards, like those closest to King Juan Carlos, overwhelmingly considered that his decision to abdicate the Crown was already convenient. Moreover, 76% and raising their degree of support for the monarchy (56%) recognized it as their preferred form of state for Spain. In fact, in a referendum, this option would have won by 20 points over the republican one. Since then, in any case, support for the monarchy has not stopped falling steadily, with some polls showing greater support for the republican cause than for the monarchic one, starting on 2020.

== See also ==
- Juan Carlos I
- Reign of Juan Carlos I
- Felipe VI
- Monarchy of Spain
- Succession to the Spanish throne
- 2019 Japanese imperial transition
