= Marquess of Alfonsín =

Spanish title of nobilty

- Coronet of a grandee of Spain
- Creation date: 24 June 2025
- Created by: Felipe VI
- Peerage: Spanish nobility
- First holder: Jaime Alfonsín, 1st Marquess of Alfonsín
- Present holder: Jaime Alfonsín, 1st Marquess of Alfonsín
- Heir apparent: Natalia Alfonsín Uranga
- Remainder to: heirs of the body of the grantee according to absolute primogeniture

Coat of arms of Jaime Alfonsín, 1st Marquess of Alfonsín

Marquess of Alfonsín (Spanish: Marqués de Alfonsín) is a hereditary title in the Spanish nobility, accompanied by the dignity of Grandee, created in 2025 by King Felipe VI. The title was bestowed to Jaime Alfonsín Alfonso, private secretary to the King from 2014 to 2024 and, before that, private secretary to the Prince of Asturias from 1995 to 2014.

== Name ==
The title takes its name from the first holder, Jaime Alfonsín.

== Creation ==
After being announced on 19 June 2025, on the 11th anniversary of King Felipe's accession, on June 24 the monarch signed Royal Decree 513/2025, of June 24, that stated:

Don Jaime Alfonsín Alfonso has personally assisted me for many years, first as Head of my Secretariat being Prince of Asturias and then as Head of my Household, with prudent judgment, loyal advice and enormous dedication, so, wanting to show him my Royal appreciation for his great loyalty and his outstanding services to Spain, the Crown and the Royal Family,

I grant him the title of Marquess of Alfonsín, accompanied by the dignity of Grandee, for him and his successors, in accordance with Spanish nobility law.

— FELIPE R., Royal Decree n.º 513 of 24 June 2025.

== Current holder ==
Jaime Alfonsín, 1st Marquess of Alfonsín (born 18 August 1956) is a retired State lawyer who started to serve in the Royal Household in December 1995, during the reign of Juan Carlos I. He was chosen to serve as the main assistant to Felipe, Prince of Asturias, as head of his Secretariat. When Felipe ascended the throne as Felipe VI in June 2014, Alfonsín was appointed Head of the Royal Household, a position he held until 2024, when he retired. Currently, he serves as private counselor to the King, trustee of the Princess of Asturias Foundation, and a member of the Royal Academy of Moral and Political Sciences.

== Line of succession ==
- Jaime Alfonsín Alfonso, 1st Marquess of Alfonsín (b. 1956)
  - (1). Natalia Alfonsín Uranga (b. 1994/1995)
  - (2). María Alfonsín Uranga
