= Royal Household Security Service =

The Royal Household Security Service, officially Security Service of the Household of His Majesty the King (Spanish: Servicio de Seguridad de la Casa de Su Majestad el Rey), is unit of the Royal Household of Spain permanently responsible for the Royal Family’s immediate (bodyguards) security. Likewise, it also provide security to other close relatives of the monarch and authorities of the Royal Household.

The Security Service, which is part of the General Secretariat of the Royal Household, is integrated by a Chief and members of the national law enforcement agencies, assigned from the Ministry of the Interior.

== History ==
The Security Service was created in 1979, three years after the restoration of the Monarchy. At first, the Royal Guard was responsible for the direct protection of the King of Spain and his Family, however, as of Royal Decree 310/1979, of February 13, a second service was established to protect them, the Security Service. The service was staffed by agents from the Civil Guard and the National Police Corps specially trained for the immediate protection of VIPs.

Since then, the Security Service has been responsible for the immediate protection of the Royal Family and other related authorities, while the Royal Guard is responsible for collaborating in external protection, protecting royal palaces and other Crown properties, as well as acting as a ceremonial guard.

== Staff ==
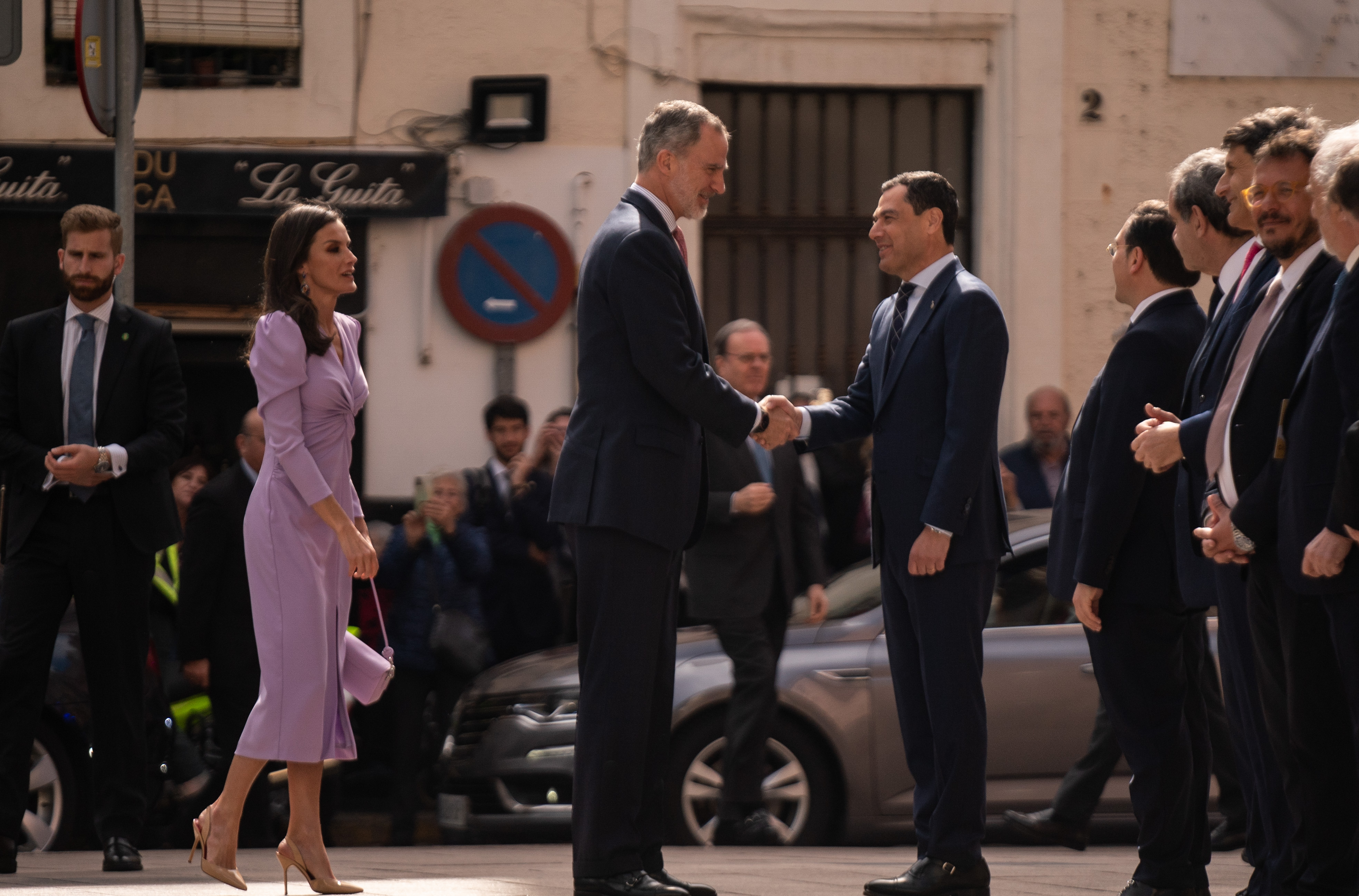
King Felipe VI and Queen Letizia being welcomed by regional and local authorities. To their left, a member of the Security Service.

The Security Service, as indicated in the second paragraph of article 7 of Royal Decree 434/1988, of May 6, is composed by members of the State Security Forces, mainly the Civil Guard and the National Police Corps.

=== Selection ===
The places to be bodyguard of the Royal Family are very scarce and they are freely appointed positions. These are some of the requirements that are required to join the Security Service:

- Not having reached the age of 38 and being less than 36 in the case of motorcyclists.
- The level of languages, knowledge of computing, electronics and the Civil Guard, the Armed Forces and civilian specialization courses related to the service to be provided are valued: protection of people, shooting, personal defense, driving, etc.
- Psychotechnical tests, a personal interview and various physical tests are carried out, including: reaction speed, resistance, vertical jump, push-ups or swimming, among others.
- If all the tests are passed, they will be summoned to the selection-training phase. The bodyguards will complete a 26-day internal course.

== Vehicles ==
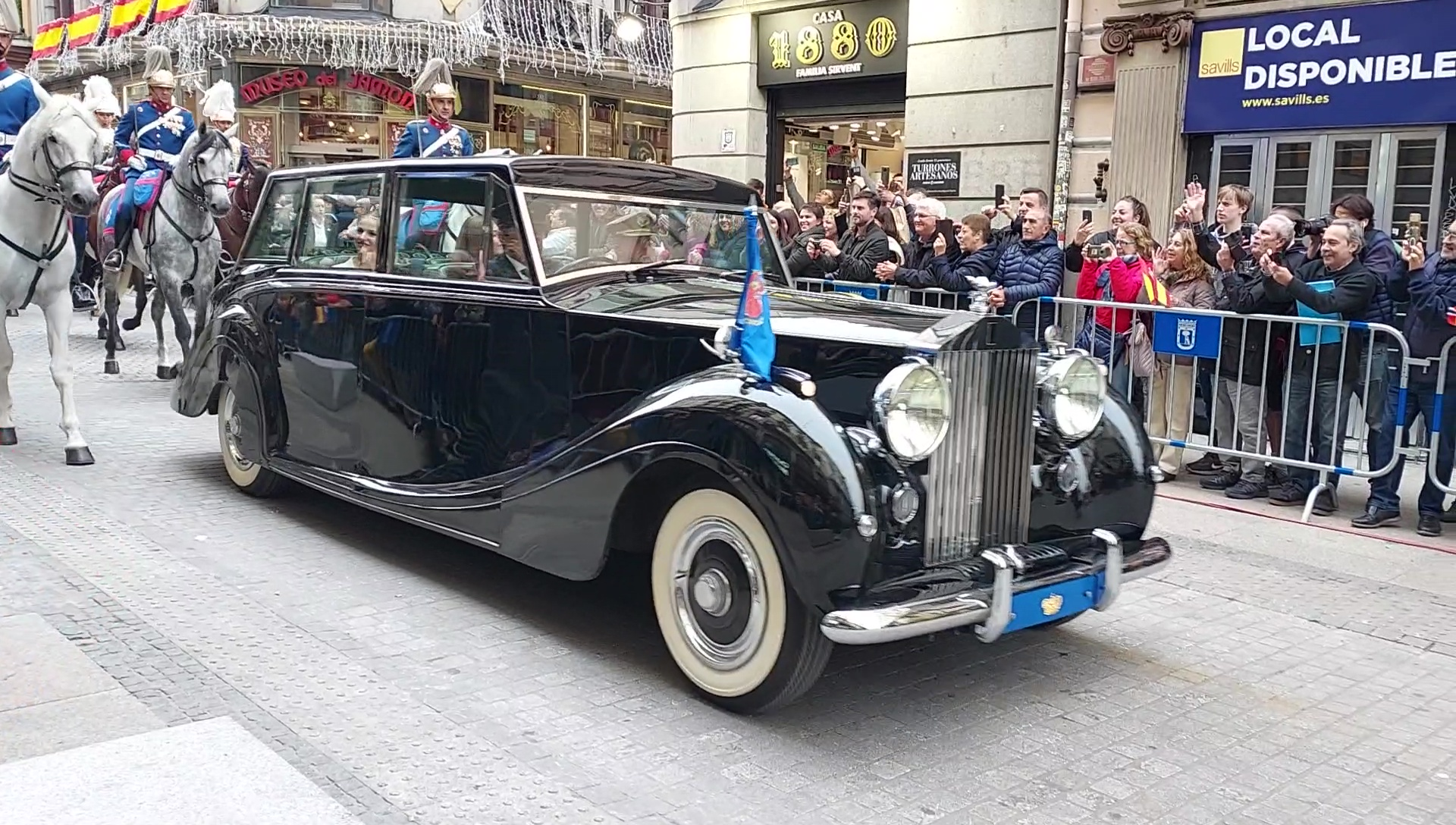
A Rolls-Royce Panthom IV carrying Leonor, Princess of Asturias in 2023.

The land transportation vehicles most used in the King's Household are those of the Mercedes-Benz brand, specifically two models, the Mercedes-Benz S-Class (W221) and the Mercedes-Benz S-Class (W220), both armoured. These are property of the State Vehicle Fleet. Also, occasionally, gala cars are used such as the exclusive Rolls-Royce Phantom IV, property of the Army. These are used for proclamations, parades or transport of foreign authorities.

The sovereign's vehicle can be distinguished by carrying a special crimson license plate with a golden royal crown in the center, as well as a pennant with its banner, while the heir to the Crown uses the same symbology but with the traditional blue color of the Principality of Asturias.

The air transportation of the Royal Family and other government officials is mainly provided by the 45th Wing (planes) and the 402nd Air Force Squadron of the 48th Wing (helicopters).
