= Albert Solà =

Spanish waiter (1956–2022)

Solà on Telecinco's ¿Quién es mi padre? ("Who is my Father?"). The episode was broadcast posthumously on 15 October 2022.

Albert Solà i Jiménez (1956 – 8 October 2022) was a Spanish man who claimed to be the illegitimate son of King Juan Carlos I.

Born in Barcelona and adopted in the Province of Girona, also in Catalonia, Solà said that he was told by a judge that he was the king's son; the judge in question denied this. In 2012, he took a DNA test with Belgian fellow claimant Ingrid Sartiau that showed 91% similarity between them, but did not include a sample from the king. After Juan Carlos I abdicated in 2014, the pair sued him in the Supreme Court of Spain, with Solà's suit being dismissed.

Solà worked as a waiter in La Bisbal d'Empordà and wrote an autobiography in 2019. He died suddenly in 2022, aged 66.

== Biography ==
Solà was born in Barcelona as Alberto Fernando Augusto Bach Ramón. During his childhood, many children were taken from unwed mothers by the authorities of Francoist Spain. Shortly after his birth, he was given to a farming family in Ibiza. According to the daughter of these foster parents, they were paid twice the usual amount. Solà said that he returned to Barcelona in 1961 to live in a large mansion, and was adopted aged 8 by Salvador Solà, a farmer in the Province of Girona.

Solà said that he received an expensive car and motorcycle with no explanation after he learned to drive, and that he was given preferential treatment during his military service. He said that in 1982, an office director would not show him his adoption records, but referred to the case as being "the most complex". According to Solà, he went to court to see his adoption records and was told by the judge that he was the son of King Juan Carlos I; judge Jorge Maza denies this.

Solà first wrote to Juan Carlos I in 2007, referring to him as his father. After not receiving a personal reply, he continued to write, threatening that "Give me some answers and I will not bother you again".

Solà said that he had been approached by an intelligence agent who had seen a photograph of him as a child with Princess María de las Mercedes of Bourbon-Two Sicilies, the mother of Juan Carlos I. Solà said that he had memories of the woman in the photograph.

Solà worked as a waiter in La Bisbal d'Empordà. In 2019, he wrote an autobiography, El Monarca de La Bisbal.

== Paternity suit ==
In 2012, Solà and Belgian woman Ingrid Sartiau, who also claimed to be an illegitimate child of Juan Carlos I, took a DNA test administered by Belgian geneticist Jean-Jacques Cassiman. The test showed 91% similarity between their samples. The test did not use a sample from the king, nor did it prove that they were his children.

Juan Carlos I had legal immunity as head of state until he abdicated in June 2014. The Congress of Deputies, led by the People's Party, moved to extend immunity to former monarchs, excluding cases in the Supreme Court of Spain. Solà's lawsuit was dismissed by that court in January 2015, while Sartiau's was heard. In March, the court dismissed Sartiau's case after the king emeritus appealed.

== Death ==
Solà died suddenly on 8 October 2022, aged 66. He had ordered a glass of wine at a bar in La Bisbal and was returning to his table when he collapsed. The security camera had been moved by an employee before and after the death; the employee said that she did this regularly if she had argued with her husband, the owner.

Television channel Telecinco debuted a series ¿Quién es mi padre? ("Who is my Father?") on 8 October 2022, interviewing people who claim to be the illegitimate children of famous men. The channel did not pull the episode they had filmed with Solà, and broadcast it on 15 October.

A local judge ordered an inquest into the death of Solà.
