= Diego Martínez Belío =

Spanish diplomat

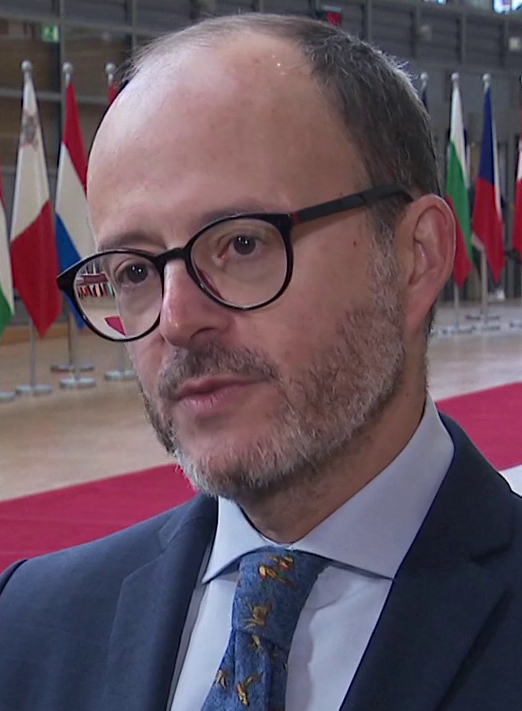

Secretary of State for Foreign Affairs
- Incumbent
- Assumed office 20 December 2023
- Preceded by: Ángeles Moreno Bau

Chief of Staff to the Foreign Minister
- In office 14 July 2021 – 20 December 2023
- Preceded by: Camilo Villarino
- Succeeded by: Sergio Cuesta Francisco

Chief of Staff to the EU Secretary of State
- In office 26 February 2020 – 13 July 2021
- Preceded by: Juan María Fernández Carnicer
- Succeeded by: Pablo Rupérez Pascualena

Personal details
- Born: 1977 (age 48–49) Huesca, Spain
- Education: Complutense University of Madrid; Paris-Sorbonne University

Diego Martínez Belío (born 1977) is a Spanish lawyer and diplomat serving since 2023 as Spain's secretary of state for foreign affairs.

== Biography ==
Born in Huesca in 1977, Martínez graduated in law by the Complutense University of Madrid and the Paris-Sorbonne University and has a diploma in Advances Studies on Economic International Law by the Paris-Sorbonne University. After years working as corporate lawyer in Madrid, Miami and Paris, in 2007 he joined the diplomatic career.

As a diplomat, he was stationed abroad as Second Chief of Mission in Equatorial Guinea and as Deputy Consul in Casablanca (Morocco).

During the premiership of Pedro Sánchez, Martínez Belío joined the Cabinet Office as advisor within the Department for European Affairs and G20, at that time led by diplomat José Manuel Albares, Secretary-General for International Affairs, European Union, G20 and Global Security.

In February 2020, he was appointed chief of staff to the secretary of state for the European Union, Juan González-Barba Pera. During this time, the COVID-19 pandemic broke out in Spain and Martínez served as one of the government's advisors on how to lift the measures to return to normal.

In July 2021, he replaced Camilo Villarino as chief of staff to his former boss, minister José Manuel Albares. In January 2022, he was promoted to the diplomatic rank of Embassy's Counsellor.

=== Secretary of State for Foreign Affairs ===
In December 2023, he was appointed as secretary of state for foreign and global affairs, second-in-command to the minister.

In September 2024, Martínez Belío accompanied Edmundo González and his wife—who had been taking refuge in the Spanish Embassy in Caracas since July—on their trip to Spain.

In July 2025, he was made commander by number of the Order of Isabella the Catholic—with other Ministry's officials—in recognition of his efforts to reach an agreement on Gibraltar's future relationship with Spain and the European Union.

From 28 to 30 July 2025, Martínez Belío toured the Persian Gulf, visiting Qatar and Bahrain to strengthen ties. In the case of Bahrain, it was the first bilateral meeting between both countries since the signing in 2013 of the agreement on political consultations.

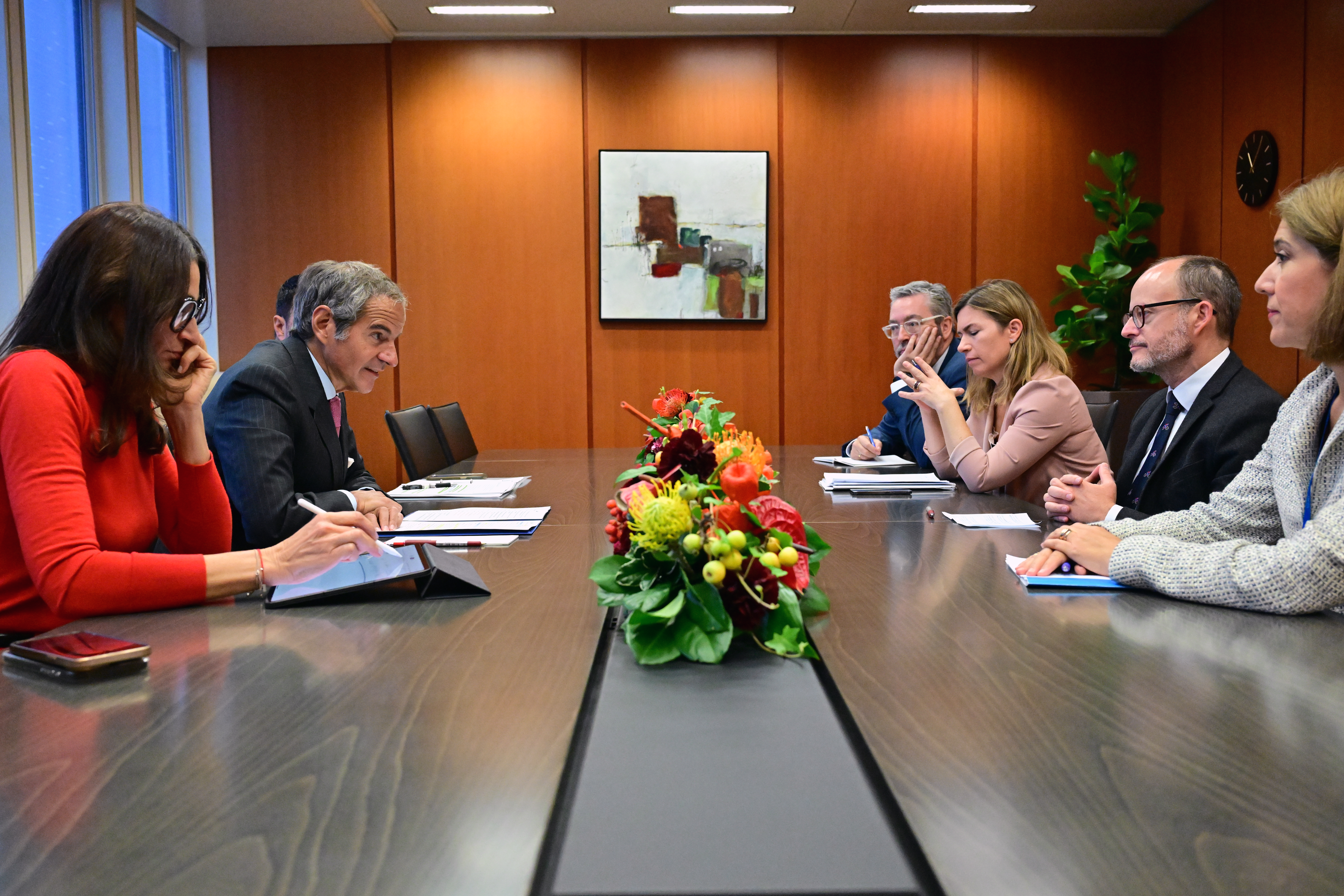
Bilateral meeting between Martínez Belío and IAEA Director Rafael Grossi

In early November 2025, he replaced Minister Albares during the State visit of Haitham bin Tariq, Sultan of Oman, to the country. On 25 January 2026, he visited Muscat (Oman) for a bilateral meeting with Oman's Under-Secretary for Political Affairs, Sheikh Khalifa Al Harthy.

From 11 to 13 November 2025, he held bilateral meetings in Japan and India. In the latter case, among other matters, joint activities were prepared for the Spain-India Dual Year to be celebrated in 2026, on the occasion of the 70th anniversary of the establishment of diplomatic relations.

On 15 December 2025, he visited Vienna (Austria) to speak at the 69th General Conference of the International Atomic Energy Agency (IAEA) where he defended Spain's position in favor of multilateralism and non-proliferation.

On 31 March 2026, the secretary of state participated in an informal meeting of the Foreign Affairs Council in Kyiv, Ukraine to commemorate the fourth anniversary of the Bucha massacre.

== Decorations ==
- Spain:
  - Commander by Number of the Order of Isabella the Catholic (2025)
  - Officer's Cross of the Order of Isabella the Catholic
  - Cross of the Order of Isabella the Catholic
- Italy:
  - Officer of the Order of Merit of the Italian Republic
- Malta:
  - Officer of the National Order of Merit
- Sweden:
  - Knight of the Order of the Polar Star
- Oman:
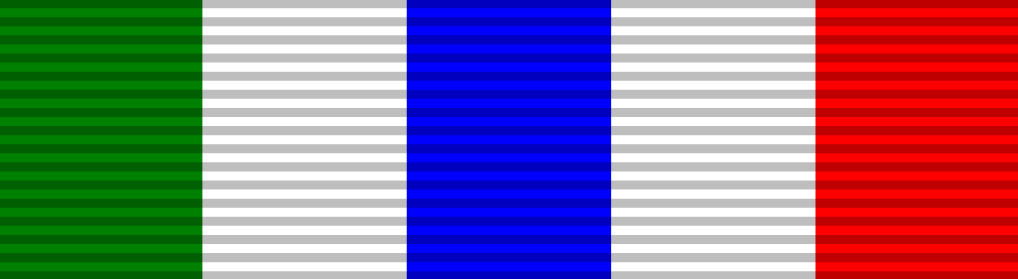
  - Order of Royal Commendation (2025)
