= Camilo Villarino =

Spanish diplomat, private secretary to King Felipe VI

The Most Excellent Camilo Villarino
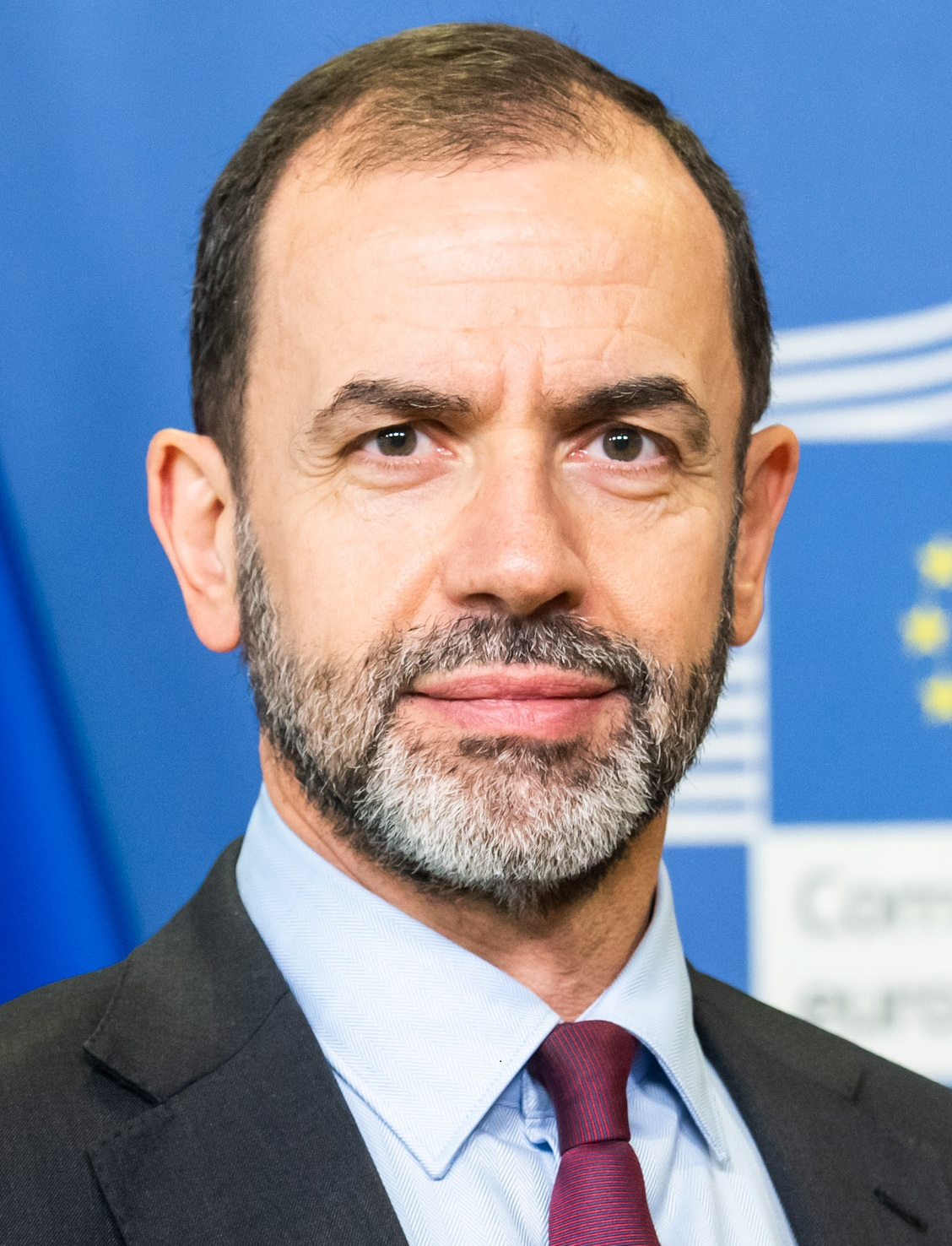

Private Secretary to the King
- Incumbent
- Assumed office 19 February 2024
- Monarch: Felipe VI
- Preceded by: The Marquess of Alfonsín

Personal details
- Born: 11 April 1964 (age 62) Zaragoza, Spain
- Spouse: Susana de Funes Casellas
- Children: 3
- Education: University of Zaragoza
- Profession: Diplomat and jurist

Camilo Villarino Marzo (Zaragoza, 11 April 1964) is a Spanish diplomat and jurist who serves as Private Secretary to the King since 19 February 2024.

== Biography ==
Villarino was born on 11 April 1964 in Zaragoza. He graduated in law from the University of Zaragoza in 1987 and he later achieved a master's degree on European Studies from the College of Europe. After this, he joined the Diplomatic School in 1989. Likewise, between 2007 and 2008 he took a High Level course on European Defense Policy at the European Security and Defence College.

One of his first assignments was at the International Legal Advisory Office of the Ministry of Foreign Affairs, serving as advisor between 1990 and 1993. Briefly, in 1993 he was adviser to the Conference on Security and Co-operation in Europe.

Between 1994 and 2002 he was assigned abroad, occupying various positions in the Spanish diplomatic missions in Croatia and before the European Union.

Back in Spain, between 2002 and 2008 he was Deputy Director-General of Institutional Affairs for the European Union at the Ministry of Foreign Affairs, responsible for the technical team in charge of the negotiations of the new treaties of the European Union.

Between 2008 and 2013 he held the position of counsellor for Transatlantic relations and security and defense affairs at the Spanish Embassy in the United States and, between 2013 and 2017, he was deputy to the ambassador of Spain to Morocco.

In June 2017, the conservative foreign minister Alfonso Dastis appointed him as his chief of staff, a position he held with two of his successors, the socialists Josep Borrell and Arancha González Laya. He resigned in mid-2021 after the appointment of a new minister José Manuel Albares, who chose to appoint diplomat Diego Martínez Belío in his place.

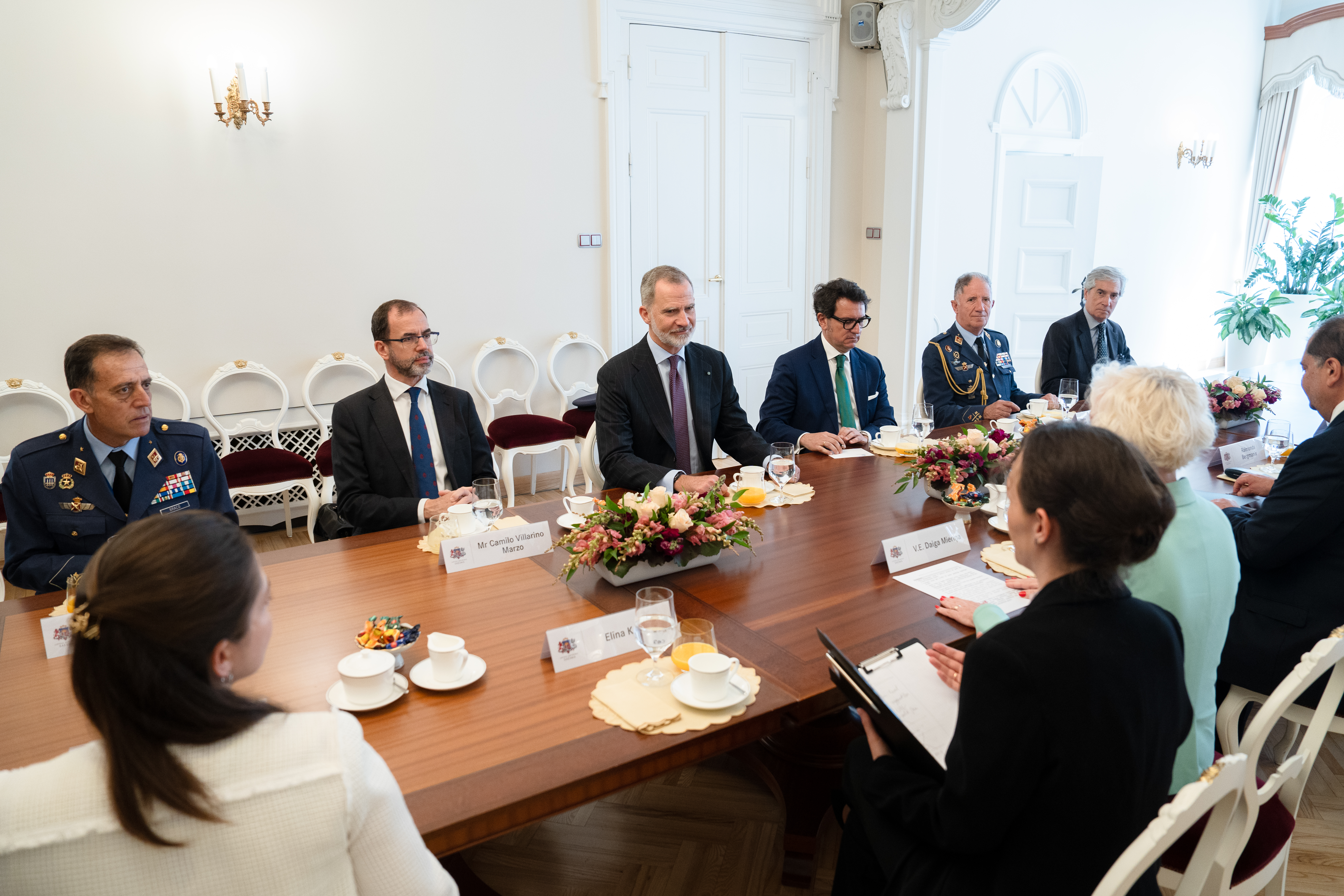
Villarino with King Felipe VI during a meeting with Daiga Mieriņa, speaker of the Latvian Saeima. June 2024

Before her dismissal, González Laya had proposed him as ambassador to Russia, even asking for the approval of the Russian Government, but her successor, minister Albares, withdrew this proposal. This controversial change of opinion had nothing to do, according to the minister, with the fact that Villarino was then accused of the so-called "Gali Case", for illegally allowing the leader of the Polisario Front, Brahim Ghali, to enter Spain. According to his testimony in court, Villarino managed the entry by following the orders of González Laya. He was finally acquitted in March 2022 of any wrongdoing.

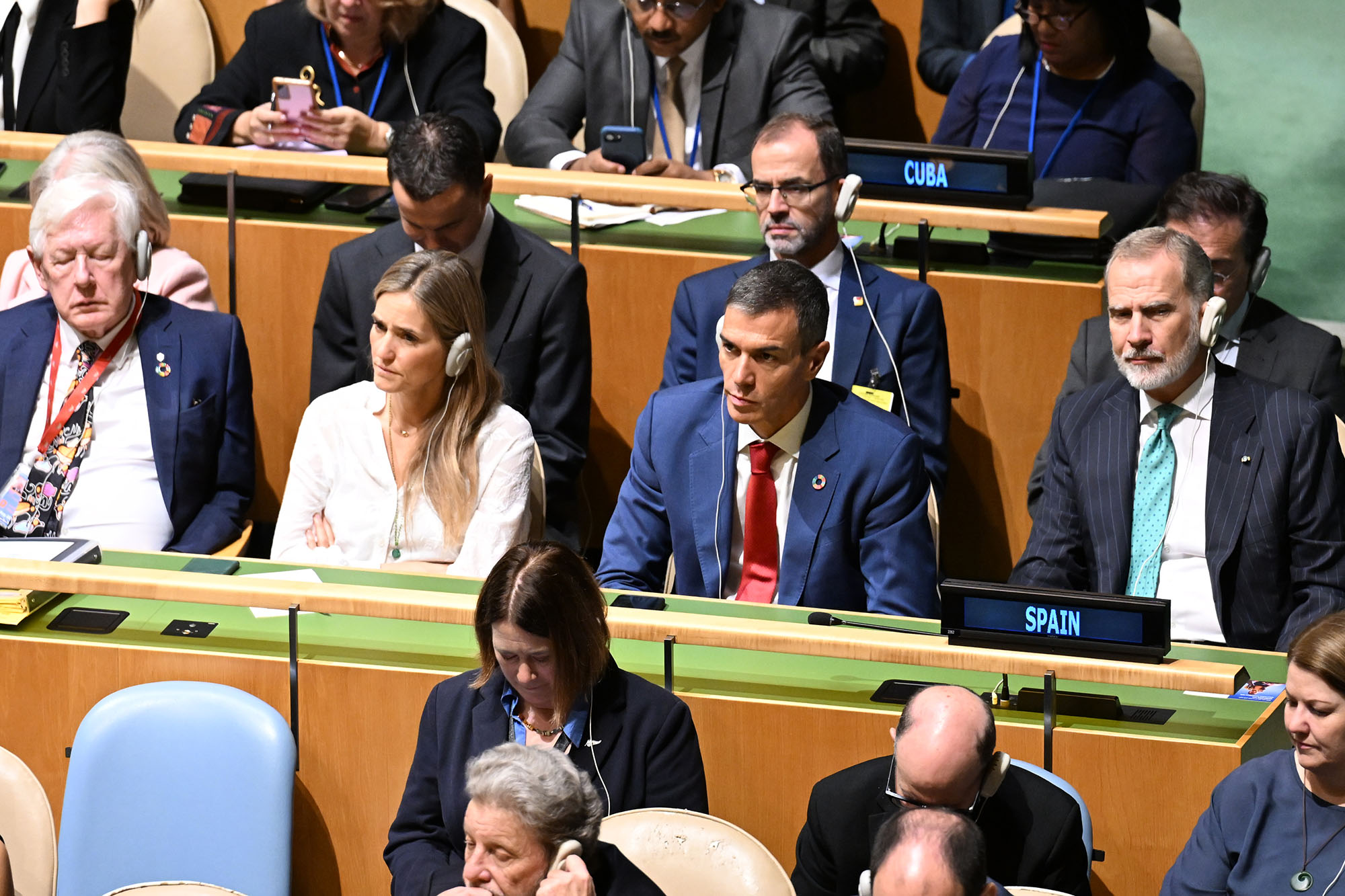
Villarino at the opening session of the general debate of the eightieth session of the United Nations General Assembly. September 2025

Later, he joined the European External Action Service and, shortly after, at the end of 2022 he was appointed as Head of the Cabinet of the High Representative of the Union for Foreign Affairs and Security Policy, Josep Borrell.

At the end of January 2024, the Royal Household made public that Villarino would replace Jaime Alfonsín, 1st Marquess of Alfonsín as Head of the Household of His Majesty the King. His appointment was made official on February 19 of that year. Villarino began his term by promoting a complete renewal of the Royal Household, appointing new heads of the main offices, including—for the first time— women at the head of the General Secretariat and the Head of the Queen's Secretariat.

He is an officer in the Voluntary Reserve of the Army, with the rank of captain.

== Personal life ==
Villarino is married to skier Susana de Funes Casellas, with whom he has three daughters: María, Marta and Inés. They live in the Madrid's municipality of Majadahonda.

== Honours ==
=== National ===
- Spain: Silver Cross of the Order of Merit of the Civil Guard (2015).
- Spain: Cross of the Order of Civil Merit (2017).
- Spain: Commander by Number of the Order of Isabella the Catholic (2019).
- Spain: Cross of Military Merit, with White Decoration (2021).
- Spain: Medal of the V Centenary of Saint Barbara (2021).

=== International ===
- Germany: Grand Cross of the Order of Merit of the Federal Republic of Germany (2025)
- Oman: Order of Royal Commendation (2025)
- Finland: Commander Grand Cross of the Order of the Lion of Finland (2026)
