= Jaime Alfonsín, 1st Marquess of Alfonsín =

Spanish state lawyer

The Most Excellent The Marquess of Alfonsín GE
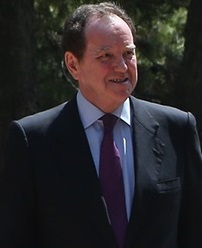
- Alfonsín in 2018

Private Secretary to the King
- In office 23 June 2014 – 19 February 2024
- Monarch: Felipe VI
- Preceded by: Rafael Spottorno
- Succeeded by: Camilo Villarino

Personal details
- Born: 18 August 1956 (age 70) Lugo, Spain
- Spouse: Natalia Uranga
- Children: 2
- Education: Autonomous University of Madrid
- Profession: State lawyer, courtier

Coat of arms of Jaime Alfonsín, 1st Marquess of Alfonsín

Jaime Alfonsín Alfonso, 1st Marquess of Alfonsín, GE (born 18 August 1956), is a Spanish state lawyer. Alfonsín served King Felipe VI for 30 years, first as Private Secretary to the Prince of Asturias from 1995 to 2014 and later as Private Secretary to the King from 2014 to 2024.

== Biography ==
Jaime Alfonsín Alfonso was born in Lugo in 1956. He graduated in law by the Autonomous University of Madrid in 1978, with the extraordinary prize of his promotion.

In 1980, he joined the State Lawyers Corps. He started to work in the provincial offices of the Spanish Treasury of Teruel and Cuenca, and later worked for the Ministry of the Presidency, the Supreme Court and in the Legal Service of the European Commission.

On 10 September 1982, he was appointed Director-General for Cooperation with Regional Regimes by Luis Cosculluela, minister for Territorial Administration. He was dismissed in late 1982, when Cosculluela left the ministerial office.

From 1984 to 1992, he has secretary-general and chief of the legal service of Barclays and, from 1992 to 1995, he worked as a lawyer in the Uría Menéndez law firm.

In December 1995, he joined the Royal Household and served as Private Secretary to the Prince of Asturias, Felipe. During this time, he supervised José Manuel de Zuleta y Alejandro, 14th duke of Abrantes, who served, unofficially, as private secretary to Princess Letizia.

When Felipe ascended the throne in June 2014, Alfonsín and Zuleta were promoted to private secretaries of the monarchs. Alfonsín was appointed as Head of the Royal Household.

Alfonsín has also been a professor of European Union Law at ICADE and was a professor of Tax Law at the Autonomous University of Madrid.

In January 2024, the Royal Household announced that Alfonsin would be replaced by diplomat Camilo Villarino as Head of the Royal Household and that he would be named private counselor of the King. Later, he was awarded with the Grand Cross of the Order of Charles III and was appointed honorary member of the Board of Trustees of the Princess of Asturias Foundation.

On 14 October 2024, he was elected an Academic of the Royal Academy of Moral and Political Sciences. His candidacy was endorsed by academics Miguel Herrero y Rodríguez de Miñón —one of the fathers of the 1978 Spanish Constitution—, Santiago Muñoz Machado —director of the Royal Spanish Academy— and María Emilia Casas —president emeritus of the Constitutional Court—. He formally joined the institution on 27 October 2025, at a ceremony presided over by King Felipe, in which he gave a speech about the role of the heiress to the throne.

On 19 June 2025, Alfonsín was created Marquess of Alfonsín. He was also made a Grandee of Spain.

Later, he joined the Permanent Deputation and Council of Grandees of Spain and Titles of the Kingdom and, since March 2026, he is part of its Governing Council.

== Personal life ==
Alfonsín is married to Natalia Uranga, a lawyer that he met at the Uría & Menéndez law firm. They have two daughters.

== Titles, honours and styles ==
- 18 August 1956 – 26 December 2003: Don Jaime Alfonsín Alfonso
- 26 December 2003 – 24 June 2025: The Most Excellent Don Jaime Alfonsín Alfonso
- 24 June 2025 – present: The Most Excellent The Marquess of Alfonsín, Grandee of Spain

=== Honours ===
==== National honours ====
- Grand Cross of Naval Merit with White Decoration (26 December 2003).
- Grand Cross of the Order of Charles III (20 February 2024).

==== Foreign honours ====
Some of his foreign honours are:

- Portugal: Grand Cross of the Order of Merit (2007).
- Mexico: Sash of the Order of the Aztec Eagle (2015).
- Portugal: Grand Cross of the Military Order of Christ (2017).
- Portugal: Grand Cross of Prince Henry (2018).
