= Rafael Spottorno =

Spanish civil servant (born 1945)

Private Secretary to the King
- In office 30 September 2011 – 24 June 2014
- Monarch: Juan Carlos I
- Preceded by: Alberto Aza Arias
- Succeeded by: The Marquess of Alfonsín

Secretary-General of His Majesty the King's Household
- In office 1993–2002
- Monarch: Juan Carlos I
- Preceded by: Joel Cansino Gimeno
- Succeeded by: Alberto Aza Arias

Personal details
- Born: 28 February 1945 (age 81) Madrid, Spain

Rafael Spottorno Díaz-Caro (born 28 February 1945), is a Spanish diplomat, Private Secretary to the King between 2011 and 2014. Since 2014, is involved in the corruption scandal named Tarjetas Black.

Spottorno has a degree in Law and has been consul in Havana and Rio de Janeiro, cultural advisor of Spain in Brussels (1974-1977), director of Political Affairs of Eastern Europe (1979), permanent representative of Spain in the Council of the NATO (1982-1983) and representative at the UN (1986). He was also the chief of staff of the Ministry of Foreign Affairs of Francisco Fernández Ordóñez and Javier Solana.

On 20 September 2011, he was appointed as Private Secretary to King Juan Carlos I (Jefe de la Casa de Su Majestad el Rey, literally 'Head of the Household of His Majesty the King') to replace Alberto Aza Arias; previously, he had served as Secretary-General of the Household of His Majesty the King from 1993 to 2002.

On the private side, he has been director of the Caja Madrid Foundation, holding this position from September 2002 to March 2011.

In September 2014, his involvement in the use of illegal cards of Caja Madrid, known as the case of black cards, was discovered; before the trial began, he returned 11.953 euros when he spent 235,818 euros unduly. He declared before Audiencia Nacional on 5 October 2016. On 7 October 2014, he resigned as private adviser to Felipe VI due to that scandal. On 13 June 2017, he was imputed again after a judge decided to file the case. On 23 February 2017 he was sentenced to two and a half years in prison and a fine of €4,200.
