= Royal Household of Spain =

Executive office for the King of Spain

Royal Household
- Household of His Majesty the King
- Insignia of the Royal Household
- Role: Executive office of the King of Spain
- Established: 16th century
- Country: Kingdom of Spain
- Responsible to: King Felipe VI
- Head of the Household: Camilo Villarino
- Secretary-General: Lt Gen. Domingo Martínez Palomo
- Court Marshal and Aides-de-Champ: Gen. of Air Emilio Gracia Cirugeda
- Constitution instrument: 1978 Constitution (Current household)
- Previous name: Royal Household and Heritage of the Crown of Spain
- Website: casareal.es

The Royal Household of Spain, officially Household of His Majesty the King (Spanish: Casa de Su Majestad el Rey), is the constitutional body whose primary function is to provide aid and support to the King of Spain in the exercise of his royal duties and prerogatives. These include his role as head of state and as commander-in-chief of the Spanish Armed Forces. It functions as the king's executive office.

The household is under the direct authority of the King, who personally selects the individuals he chooses to aid him in his constitutional duties. It is a constitutional institution, as laid down in Spain’s constitution of 1978. While the household is part of Spain’s governmental structure, it is not under the control or influence of any other state institution. The household ensures that the King has the independent means to perform all of his state functions. In particular, it is not under the administrative control of the prime minister or the Council of Ministers. The only authority to whom it answers is the King himself.

One of the household's primary functions is to facilitate communications between the King and the other State authorities. It is responsible for written and oral communications between the King and the government departments. It organizes and schedules meetings between the king and the prime minister, Crown ministers, secretaries of state, under-secretaries and other officials.

Its budget, like those of the Office of the Prime Minister, the Council of Ministers, the Supreme Court, the Armed Forces and many others, is approved by the houses of the Spanish Parliament on a yearly basis.

== Background ==
The current Royal Household has its historical precedent in the Royal Household and Heritage of the Crown of Spain, which was made defunct by the establishment of the Second Spanish Republic in 1931. Following the eventual restoration of the monarchy and Juan Carlos I's accession to the throne as King in 1975, a new Royal Household was established. This new household was completely different from the former court of his grandfather, Alfonso XIII. The modern Royal Household is much simpler than the precedent institution and it was decided not to recreate the majority of offices which existed in the old Royal Household, maintaining basically the Head of the Royal Household and the Secretary General of the Royal Household. Both these offices are held by professional, senior civil servants, even if they come from the nobility.

== Royal Household budget ==
According to article 65(1) of the 1978 constitution, the King is entitled to compensation from the annual state budget for the maintenance of his family and household administration, and distributes these funds at his discretion.

This budget is used to pay the salaries of members of the royal family who perform duties on behalf of the Spanish state. It also pays for the salaries and benefits (retirement, medical etc.) of the staff who work directly for the Household of His Majesty the King. The budget approved for 2023 is €8.43 million.

The two princesses are currently in school and do not perform public functions and as such do not receive a salary. Once they come of age they will assume public duties and be granted a salary in order to accomplish those duties.

== Organizational structure ==
Organizational chart Spanish Royal Household

According to article 65(2) of the 1978 constitution:

"The King freely appoints and dismisses the civilian and military members of his household."

In accordance with article 65(2), the authority to organize the royal household of His Majesty the King is vested in the Monarch himself. In the exercise of this authority the King chooses the officers and decides which departments form a part of the royal household. He also determines the functions and duties that they are responsible for carrying out. The sovereign exercises this authority in the form of a Royal Decree.

The current structure of the royal household is set down in Royal decree 434/1988 and subsequent amendments to it as ordered by the King.

=== Head of the Household ===
The Head of the Household, or Private Secretary to the King, is responsible for the over all operation and management of the departments of the Royal Household. He holds the rank and privileges (pay, vacation) of a Cabinet minister. He is the king’s most senior personal political adviser and reports directly to him. The head of the household is the primary channel of communication between the king and the various departments of the state administration. He advises the monarch on all issues pertaining to constitutional, foreign, political and military affairs.

The Financial Comptroller of the household is in charge of the accounting department that prepares the annual budgets for the household’s departments.

The Diplomatic Advisor to the Royal Household closely monitors international relations and developments in foreign affairs. He advises the head of household and the King in these areas.

Since the restoration of the monarchy in 1975, the heads of the Household have been:

- 1975–1990 — Nicolás Cotoner, 23rd Marquess of Mondéjar, Grandee of Spain
- 1990–1993 — Sabino Fernández Campo, 1st Count of Latores, Grandee of Spain
- 1993–2002 — Fernando Almansa, 10th Viscount of Castillo de Almansa, Grandee of Spain
- 2002–2011 — Alberto Aza
- 2011–2014 — Rafael Spottorno
- 2014–2024 — Jaime Alfonsín, 1st Marquess of Alfonsín, Grandee of Spain
- Since 2024 — Camilo Villarino

=== General Secretariat ===
The secretary-general is the deputy head of the King's Household and is responsible for the coordination of all its services. He also replaces the head of the Household in the case of absence or illness. The General Secretariat is divided into units, whose heads form the Household's management team.

The Planning and Coordination Cabinet is the support unit for both the head of the Household and the secretary-general, with assistance and immediate collaboration tasks in the fulfillment of the duties assigned to them. The Bureau and Activities and Programmes form part of this Cabinet.

The Queen's Secretariat carries out the study, preparation and implementation of all matters related to the Queen's activities and those of the infantas. In 2025, Marta Carazo of RTVE assumed the role on 1 September 2025.

The Security Service is responsible for the family's immediate (bodyguards) security. It has a commander and is composed of units of the State Security Forces, assigned from the Ministry of the Interior. It is also in charge of ensuring the royal family's security during travel between secure locations, for example inspecting sewers for bombs and posting snipers on roofs.

The Press and Communications Office maintains contact with professionals from the media, informing them of the official activities of the Royal Family, as well as their contents and organisation.

The Protocol Office prepares and manages all aspects pertaining to protocol of the Royal Family’s different activities, both in Spain and abroad.

The Administration, Infrastructure and Services Section manages the financial and budgetary side, as well as matters pertaining to the Household's staff. It manages and organises telecommunication and information services. It coordinates general maintenance of the installations of the Zarzuela Palace. The Quartermaster's Office and the Communications and Information Centre form part of this unit.

The General Secretariat's staff consists of 139 civil servants, apart from those assigned to the Security Service by the Ministry of the Interior.

The Secretaries General have been:

- 1976–1977 — Alfonso Armada, 9th Marquis of Santa Cruz de Rivadulla
- 1977–1990 — Sabino Fernández Campo, 1st Count of Latores, Grandee of Spain
- 1990–1991 — José Joaquín Puig de la Bellacasa
- 1991–1993 — Joel Cansino Gimeno
- 1993–2002 — Rafael Spottorno Díaz-Caro
- 2002–2002 — Alberto Aza Arias
- 2002–2011 — Ricardo Díez-Hochleitner Rodríguez
- 2011–2014 — Alfonso Sanz Portolés
- Since 2014 — Domingo Martínez Palomo

=== Military Household Staff ===
The King’s Military Staff (Spanish: Cuarto Militar) is primarily responsible for assisting him in the performance of his duties as the Supreme Commander (commander-in-chief) of the Spanish Armed Forces. It also is responsible (along with the Security Service) for the maintenance of security at all Royal Sites. The Royal Guard is part of the military household.

The Military Staff is commanded by a general or lieutenant general who is appointed freely by the Monarch. The King also appoints the chief of the Royal Guard who holds the rank of colonel. The Military Staff is the main channel of communication between the King and the ministry of defense. It is in charge of preparing the king’s military schedule and for arranging meetings with military personnel at the ministry of defense. Royal decrees dealing with military matters are sent to the king via the military household.

The Chief of the Military Staff is in charge of:

- The Military Cabinet.
- The Military Law Advisor.
- The Military Auditor.
- The Royal Guard.

The Military Cabinet is divided into four Sections covering staff, protocol, operations and logistics.

The Aides-de-Champ to His Majesty the King are senior military officers, which are organised in successive 24-hour duty periods, who assist the king when carrying out his official duties. Their duties include arranging the kings travel and keeping track of his paperwork and documentation. At least one ADC accompanies the King at all times. The Queen also has ADCs assigned as needed. The heir to the throne will, on coming of age, also have ADCs. They also form part of the Retinue of Honour of foreign Heads of State on official visit to Spain. There were a set number of aides-de-camp from each of the armed forces until the quotas were abolished in 2015.

Chiefs of Military Staff have been:

- 1986–? — José Santos Peralba Giráldez
- 2002–? — Antonio González-Aller
- ?–2010 — Felipe Carlos Victoria de Ayala
- 2010–2014 — Antonio de la Corte
- 2014–2020 — Juan Ruiz Casas
- Since 2020 — Emilio Gracia Cirugeda

== See also ==
- Spanish Royal Guard
- List of titles and honours of the Spanish Crown
- List of Spanish monarchs
- List of Spanish royal consorts
- Family tree of Spanish monarchs
- Succession to the Spanish throne
- Archivo General de Palacio
- Politics of Spain
