= Royal guard =

Group of military bodyguards for the protection of a royal person

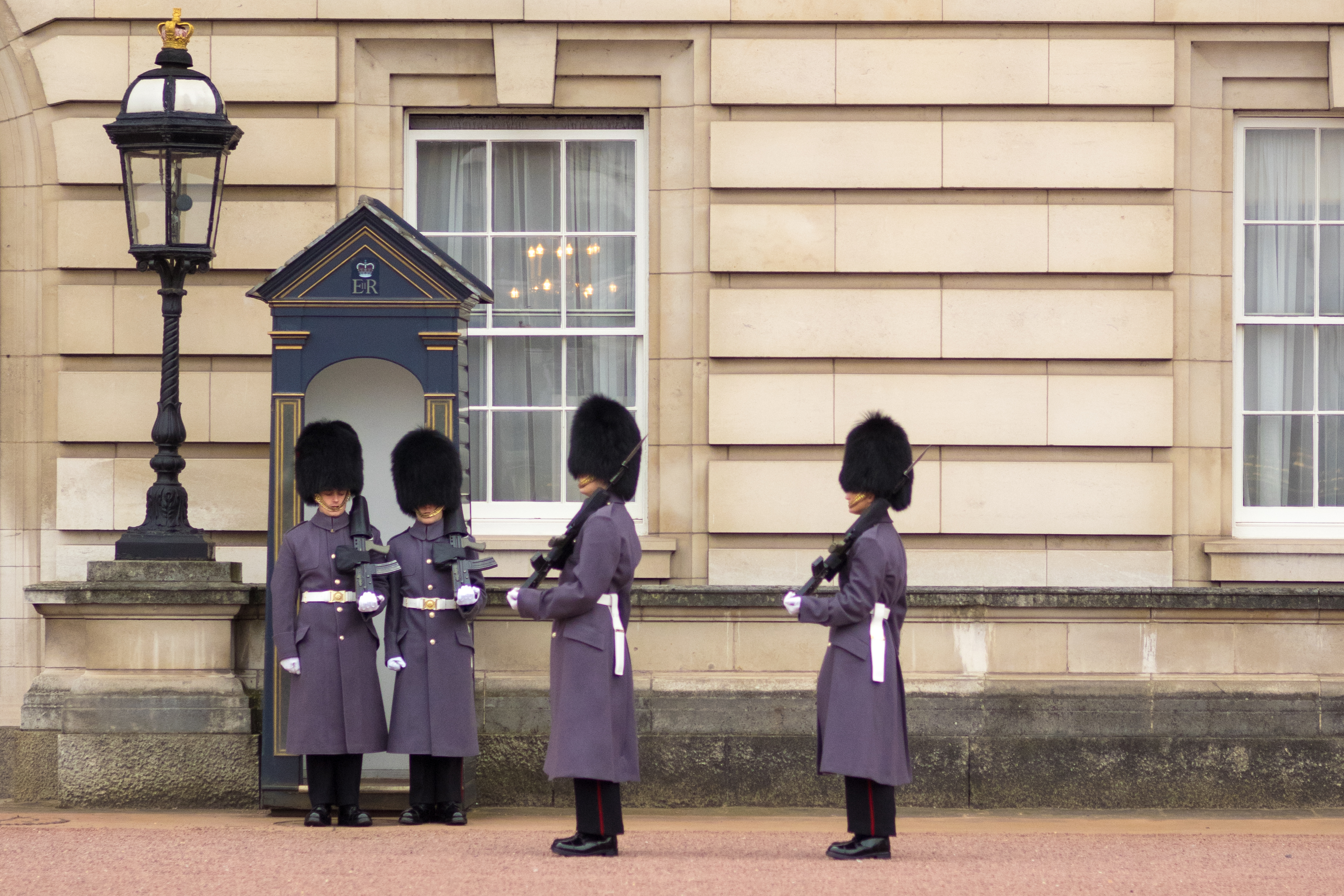
King's Guards at Buckingham Palace

A royal guard (also called a palace guard) is a group of military bodyguards, soldiers, or armed retainers responsible for the protection of a royal family member, such as a king or queen, or prince or princess. They often are an elite unit of the regular armed forces, or are designated as such, and may maintain special rights or privileges.

== Institution and tasks ==
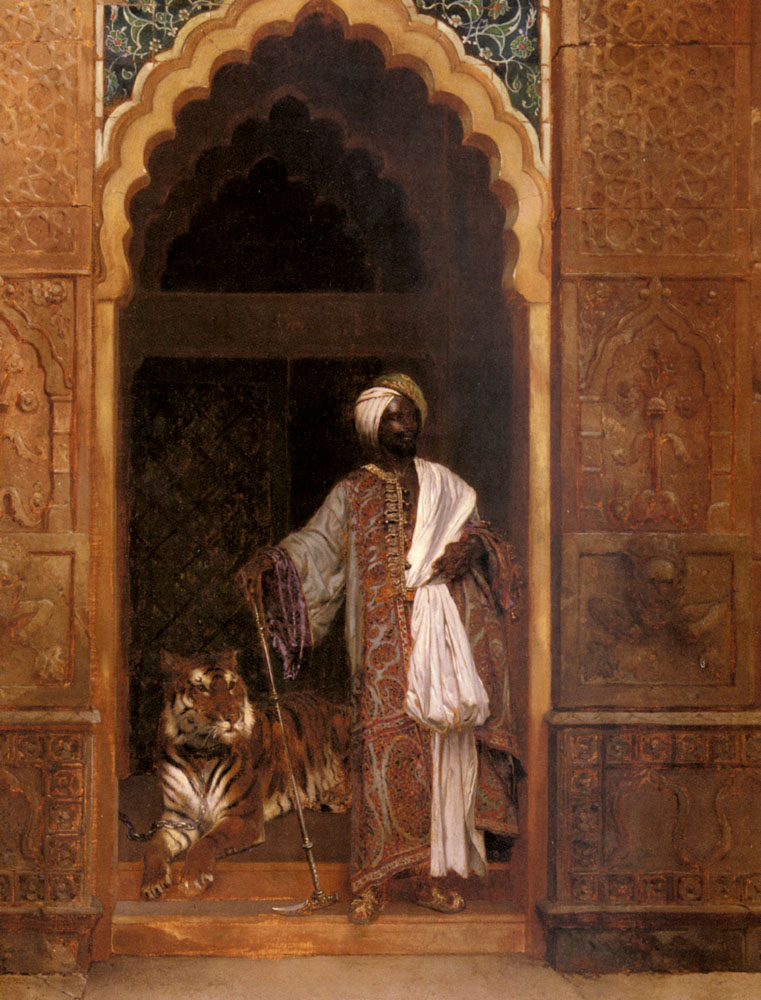
The Palace Guard by Ernst Rudolf.

Royal guards have historically comprised both purely ceremonial units serving in close proximity to the monarch, as well as regiments from all arms, forming a designated substantial elite and intended for active service as part of the army. An example of the first category would include the Tropas de la Casa Real of the Spanish monarchy prior to 1930, comprising halberderos and a mounted escort. Examples of the second would include the Imperial Guards of the Russian and German Empires prior to 1917–18.

Monarchs frequently modelled their royal guards upon those of fellow rulers. Thus, Napoleon I's Garde Imperiale was imitated by his opponent Alexander I of Russia, his Bourbon successor Louis XVIII, and his nephew Napoleon III. The modern Garderegiment Grenadiers en Jagers regiment of the Netherlands and the Escorte Royale of Belgium retain features of uniform and other distinctions that can be traced back to Napoleonic influences.

== Political importance ==
Because of their location, status, role and nature, royal guards have frequently been able to play a political role beyond their intended military and social ones. In times of revolution, the continued loyalty or defection of such units has often played a key part in the outcome of wider unrest. Historical examples were England in 1688, Spain in 1808, Sweden in 1809, France in 1789 and again in 1814-15, Russia in 1917 and Persia in 1906 and again in 1953.

== List of royal guards ==
=== Past ===
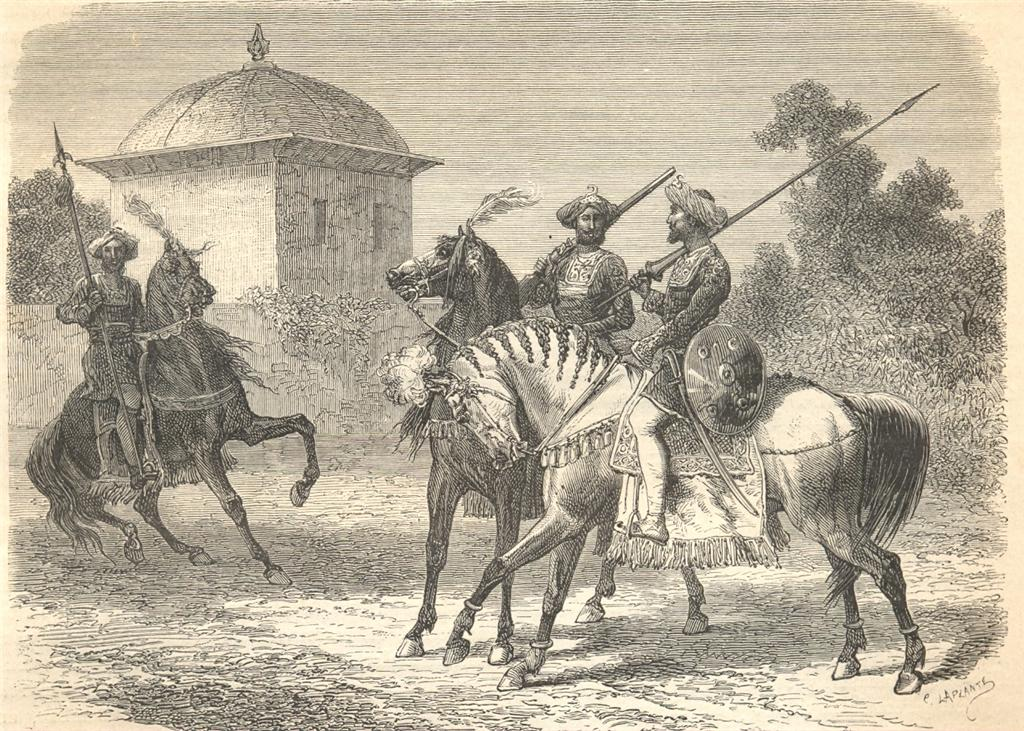
Royal Guards in Baroda

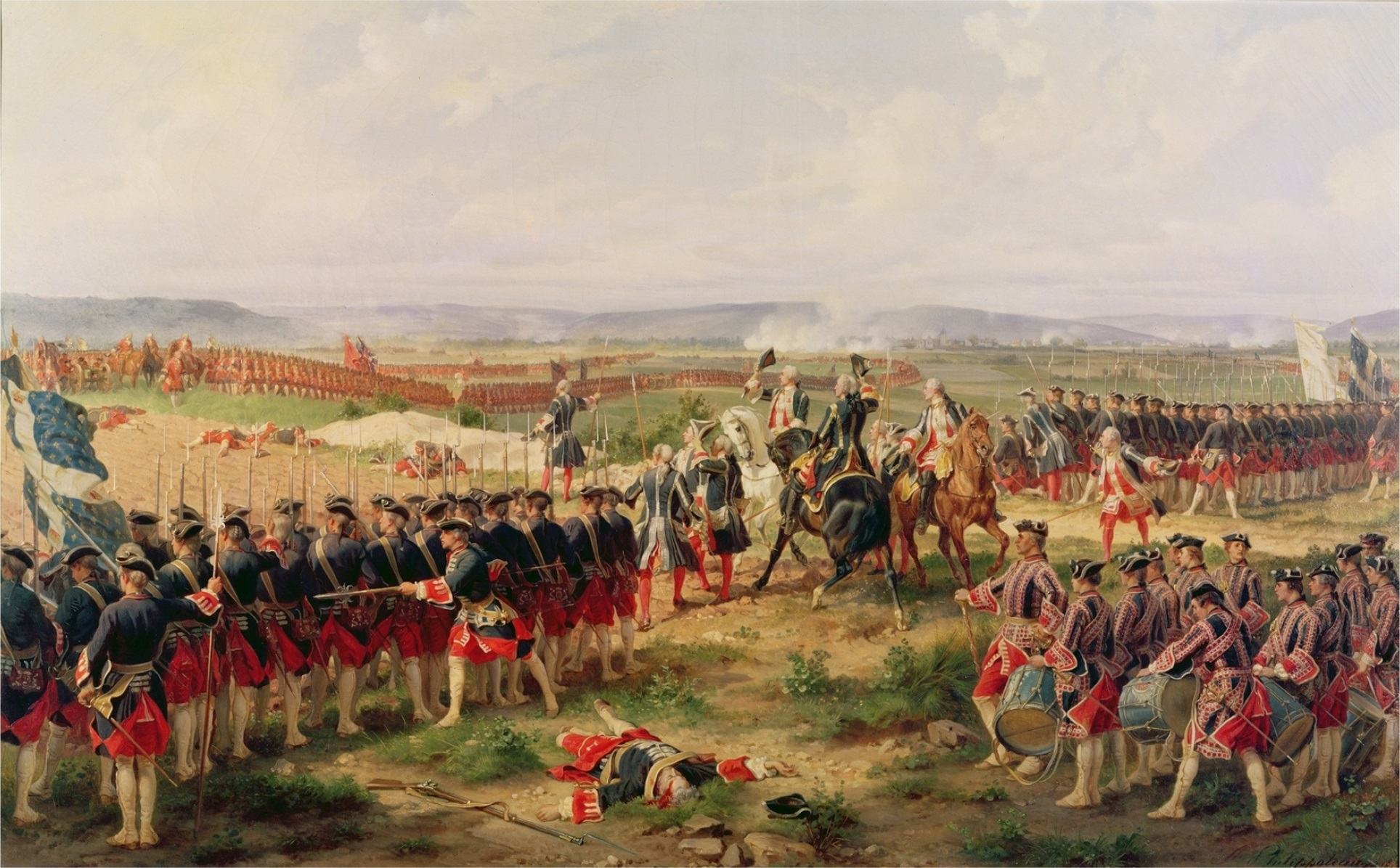
The French Guards at Fontenoy in 1745.

- Mesedi, in the Hittite Empire
- Medjay, since the old kingdom of Egypt until the Ptolemaic dynasty
- Somatophylakes, in the ancient Kingdom of Macedonia
- Royal Palace Guards, in Burma
- Pengawal Diraja, in Brunei
- Hangu Beykalun, the Royal Bodyguards of Maldivian Sultan, the unit was formed by Muhammad Thakurufaanu al-Auzam (1573–1585), decommissioned in early 1930s, at the end of the reign Sultan Muhammad Shamsuddeen III
- Royal Foreign Units Guards, King's Royal Guards such as the Scottish Guard, Swiss Guards such as the Hundred Swiss, Guards of the French Royal Army, which served the European monarchies such as the Kingdom of France (the Ancien Régime), part of the Maison militaire du roi de France.
- Monaspa, in the Kingdom of Georgia
- Tobang, in the Goryeo dynasty of Korea
- Naegeumwi, in the Joseon dynasty of Korea
- Athapattuva, in the Kingdom of Kandy
- Monteros de Espinosa, in the Kingdom & Crown of Castille, now part of the Guardia Real of Spain
- Walloon Guards, in Spain; recruited from the Spanish Netherlands
- Spanish Guards (Gardes Espagnoles), an infantry regiment brigaded with the Walloon Guards but recruited within Spain itself.
- Maison militaire du roi de France (to which belonged the Garde du Corps, the Swiss Guards, and the French Guards), in the Kingdom of France
- Royal Foot Guard, in the Kingdom of Poland and the Polish–Lithuanian Commonwealth
- Leibgarde der Hartschier, in the Kingdom of Bavaria
- Guards Corps, in the Kingdom of Prussia, and later in the German Empire
- Noble Guard and Palatine Guard, in the Holy See until 1970
- Corazzieri and Granatieri di Sardegna, in the Kingdom of Sardinia and later the Kingdom of Italy
- Personal Cavalry Convoy, in the Principality of Bulgaria and Kingdom of Bulgaria
- Königliche Ungarische adelige Leibgarde (Royal Hungarian Noble Bodyguard)
- Royal Hungarian Crown Guard. In existence under both the Austro-Hungarian Empire and the subsequent Kingdom of Hungary
- Royal Guard of the Halberdiers, in the Kingdom of Portugal
- Royal Palace Guard, in Belgium
- Royal Guard in Greece, now the Presidential Guard
- Romanian Royal Guards, in Romania

=== Present ===
- Royal Guard, in Bahrain
- Royal Escort, in Belgium
- Gurkha Reserve Unit, in Brunei
- Ceremonial Guard, in Canada
- Den Kongelige Livgarde and Guard Hussar Regiment Mounted Squadron, in Denmark
- Royal Guards of Hawaii, a ceremonial guard unit of the Hawaii Air National Guard
- Royal Guard, in Jordan
- Royal Johor Military Force, in Malaysia
- Compagnie des Carabiniers du Prince, in Monaco
- Royal Guard, in Morocco
- Grenadiers' and Rifles Guard Regiment, Garderegiment Fuseliers Prinses Irene and the Royal Marechaussee in the Netherlands
- Hans Majestet Kongens Garde, in Norway
- Royal Guard, in Oman
- Royal Guard Regiment, in Saudi Arabia
- Guardia Real, in Spain
- Livgardet and Livregementets husarer, in Sweden
- King's Guard and the Royal Security Command, in Thailand
- Tongan Royal Guards part of His Majesty's Armed Forces of Tonga
- King's Guard; Honourable Corps of Gentlemen at Arms; High Constables and Guard of Honour of the Palace of Holyroodhouse; Royal Company of Archers; and Yeomen of the Guard, in the United Kingdom
- Pontifical Swiss Guard, in Vatican City

== Similar units ==
- Foot guards
- Household Division
- Imperial guard
- Lifeguard
- Presidential guard

== Related units ==
- Colour guard
- Guard of honour
- Sovereign's Bodyguard

== See also ==
- United States Secret Service
- Republican guard
- National guard
- Swiss Guards
