= Natsgvardiya =

Natsgvardiya, or Nats-hvardiia, means National Guard in Slavic languages. The term may refer to:

- National Guard of Russia
- National Guard of Ukraine
