= Royal Guard (Spain) =

Independent regiment of the Spanish Armed Forces

- Guardia Real
- Emblem of the Royal Guard
- Founded: 1504; 522 years ago
- Country: Spain
- Allegiance: Monarchy of Spain
- Type: Royal guard
- Role: Executive protection Foot guards Honor guard
- Size: 1,500 troops (1 regiment)
- Part of: Spanish Armed Forces (predominantly Spanish Army)
- Garrison/HQ: Royal Palaces
- Mottos: Al servicio de la Corona ("At the service of the Crown")
- March: Himno de la Guardia Real ("Hymn of the Royal Guards")
- Anniversaries: October 12

Commanders
- Chief Colonel: Colonel Juan Manuel Salom Herrera
- Notable commanders: General Prim; General Castaños

The Royal Guard (Spanish: Guardia Real) is an independent regiment of the Spanish Armed Forces that is dedicated to the protection of the King of Spain and members of the Spanish royal family. It is currently composed of 1,500 troops. While the Guard participates in parades and other ceremonial events, it is a fully functional combat unit. Its members are recruited from the ranks of all three branches of the Spanish Armed Forces and receive the same combat training as regular soldiers.

The Royal Guards, though originally an army unit complete with infantry, cavalry, & artillery, with the oldest regiments being the Regimiento de Infantería Inmemorial del Rey nº 1 (King’s Memorial regiment no. 1) and the Regimiento del Ejército de Tierra (Land Army regiment), over time, it has acquired a few more detachment companies from other branches, most notably: the La Compañía mar Océano (Ocean Sea Company); a naval infantry company from the Navy & the La Escuadrilla Plus Ultra (Plus Ultra Squad) a paratrooper company are officially under the Air and Space Force, among others. The army cavalry of the guards is known as the Escuadrón de Escolta Real (Royal Scout Squad).

Though technically, the Royal Guards are officially under the umbrella of the overall Spanish Armed Forces, true to its army roots, when deploys in combat, it serves the function of a ground force. Some units served in Afghanistan and Bosnia.

== History ==
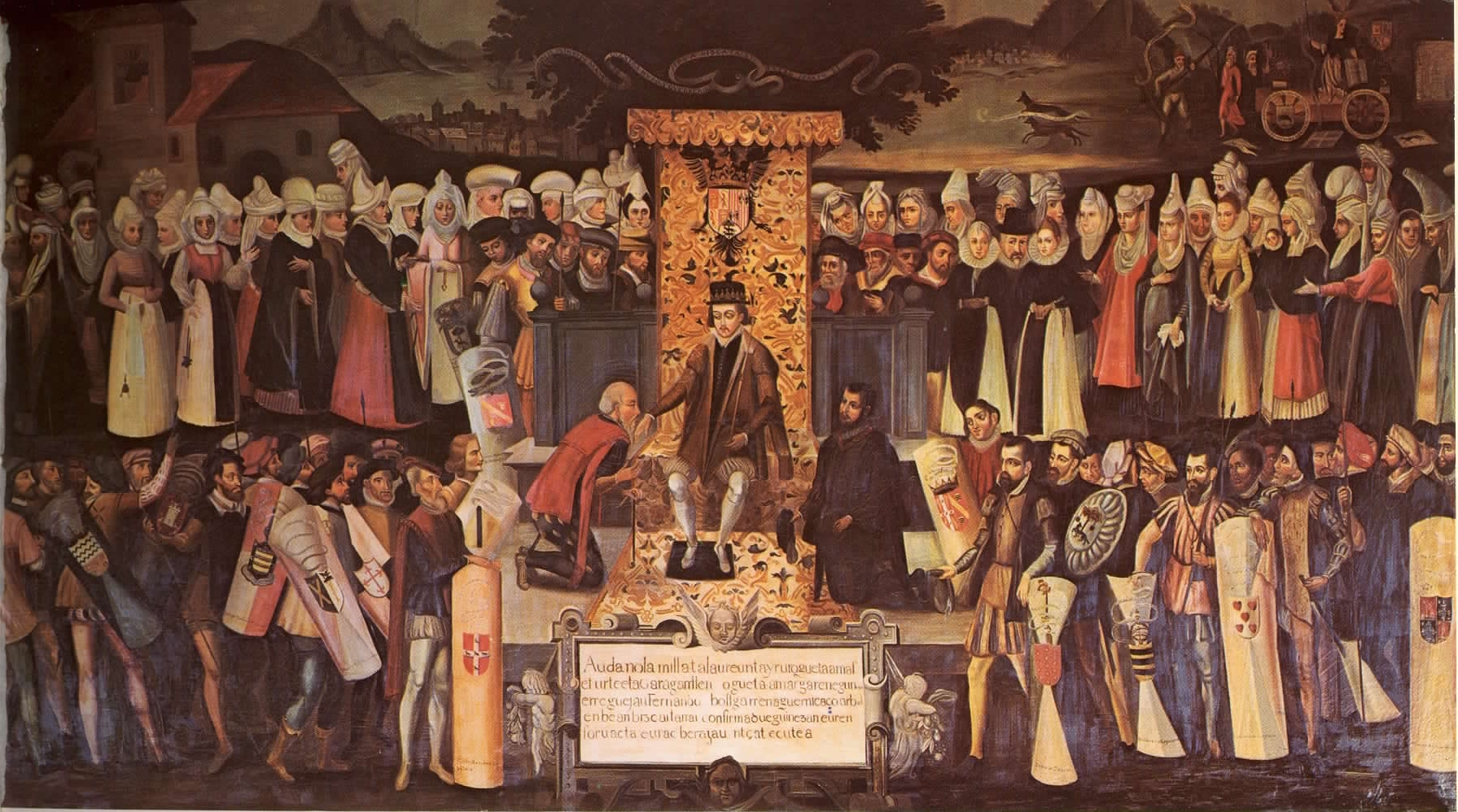
King of Castile Ferdinand V being escorted by the Royal Guard during the swearing of the Fueros in Guernica in 1476 as Lord of Biscay

The history of the Royal Guard dates back to medieval times. The senior unit and one of the oldest guards corps in the world is the Corps of Gentlemen of the Chamber, the Monteros de Espinosa, dating to 1006 and created by Sancho Garcia of the House of Castile.

Even before the time of the first monarch of Spain, the Catholic Monarchs formed the Guardias Viejas de Castilla ("Old Guards of Castile"). Later on, the first monarch of Spain, Charles V ordered that a company of those guards to reside and continuously stand guard in his palace, denominating it Los Cien Continos ("The Continuous Hundred").

=== Official formation ===
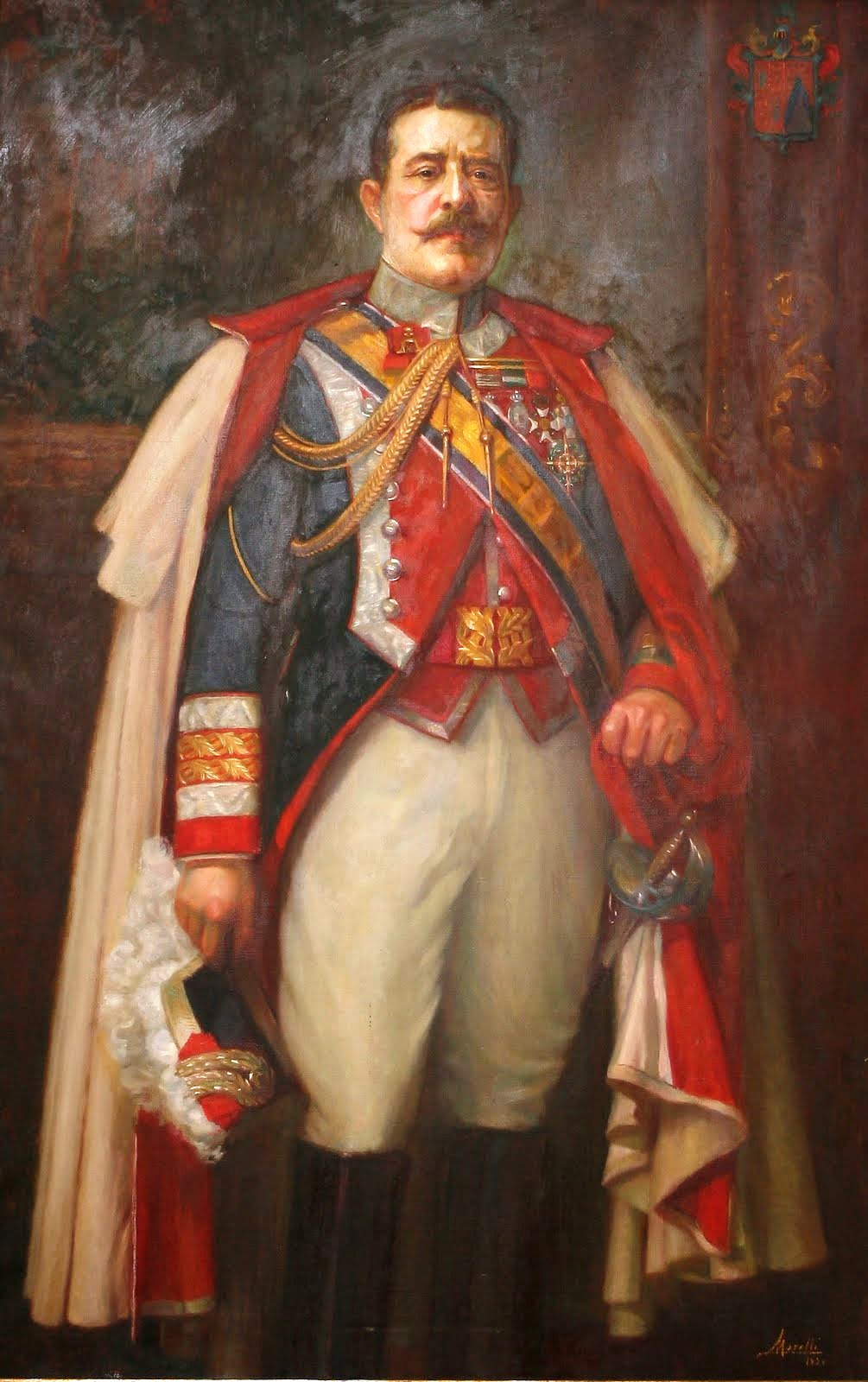
Lt Gen José Cavalcanti in the uniform of commandant-general of the Corps of Royal Guards Halberdiers (reign of Alfonso XIII)

When arriving in Spain in 1502, Charles V's father, Philip the Handsome brought with him his Guardia Borgoñona ("Burgundian Guards"). They were also called the Guardia de los Archeros (aka Guardia de Cuchilla > "Guards of the Blade") because they were armed with a glaive-type polearm called an archa, not because they were archers (arqueros). Their purpose was to secure the royal household by standing guard or patrolling the grounds on horseback. These group of Royal Guards with their Burgundian style, together with two units of alabarderos ("halberdiers"), would remain in service until the reorganization of the Troops of the Royal Household (Tropas de Casa Real) by Philip V. During his reign, the Royal Guards were organized into:

- Headquarters
- Royal Guards Halberdiers
- Royal Carabinier Guards
- Musketeers of the Royal Guards
- Guards de Corps (organized as a squadron)
- Two Guards infantry regiments (Walloon Guards and Guards of Spain)

In the 19th century the Guards were reinforced by the Spanish Marine Infantry, which formed its own unit.

In 1824-25 the Guards was expanded into a fully independent army group reporting to the sovereign and the Royal Military Household with two full corps following the example of France's Napoleonic Imperial Guard and Borbon Restorationist Royal Guards:

- Internal Royal Guards Corps
  - Halberdiers
  - Guards of the Royal Household
    - Guards de Corps
    - Infantry units
- External Royal Guards Corps
  - 1st Guards Infantry Division
    - 1st and 2nd Guards Infantry Brigades, organized into two to three regiments of infantry
  - 1st Guards Cavalry Division
    - 1st and 2nd Guards Cavalry Brigades
  - Royal Horse Artillery Battery
  - Train Company
  - Royal Guard Company of Sappers and Miners
- 2nd Guards Infantry Division (Provincial)
  - Royal Guard Grenadiers Brigade
  - Royal Guards Rifle Brigade

In the 1840s only the internal units of the Royal Guards remained as the others were disbanded or transferred to the regular Army. In 1868 the Halberdiers stood down, only to be reformed under King Amadeo I as the Royal Guard Battalion of one infantry company and one cavalry troop and revived as a full battalion under his successor, Alfonso XII.

=== Civil War ===
The Guards were disbanded in 1931 as a result of the formation of the Second Republic and was replaced by the Presidential Horse Guards Squadron (Escuadrón de Escolta Presidencial), which was a cavalry formation. By 1936, it included the infantry Presidential Guards Battalion (Batallón de Guardia Presidencial), which remained loyal to the Republic during the civil war.

=== Restoration ===
Under Francisco Franco, by Decree of February 4, 1949, the Military House of the Generalissimo was reorganized and on the basis of the republican formations the Regiment of the Guards of His Excellency the Head of State (Regimiento de la Guardia de Su Excelencia el Jefe del Estado), later on the Guards Regiment of HE the Generalissimo (Regimiento de la Guardia de S.E. el Generalísimo), was activated, which included a mounted squadron (the Guardia Mora) which was first raised from surplus personnel of the Regulares. After several reorganizations, the unit would last until Franco's death as a combined arms guards regiment.

Upon Franco's death and the ascension of King Juan Carlos I as the head of state and commander-in-chief of the armed forces, the guards regiment was integrated into the new army under the king, forming the basis of what is now the modern day Guardia Real - the Royal Guards Regiment (Regimento de la Guardia Real), which is responsible to the king through the Ministry of Defense. In the 1980s it grew into a three-battalion regiment. Today it is a four-battalion unit that serves as the protocol and security service of the Spanish royal family.

=== Modern Day ===
In 2002, a section from the Royal Guards Land Army Company deployed to Kosovo as part of peacekeeping efforts there.

The following year, a platoon from the Royal Guards Air & Space Force Company and a platoon from the Naval Infantry Marine Company of the Royal Guards also joined the peacekeeping efforts in Kosovo and was stationed there throughout the year.

In 2005, a section from the Land Army Company of the Royal Guards deployed again to Kosovo.

In 2006, a platoon from the Royal Guards Air & Space Force Company deployed to Afghanistan.

In 2007, a mixed section (made up of members from all the branches) of the Royal Guards deployed again to Kosovo.

== Role ==
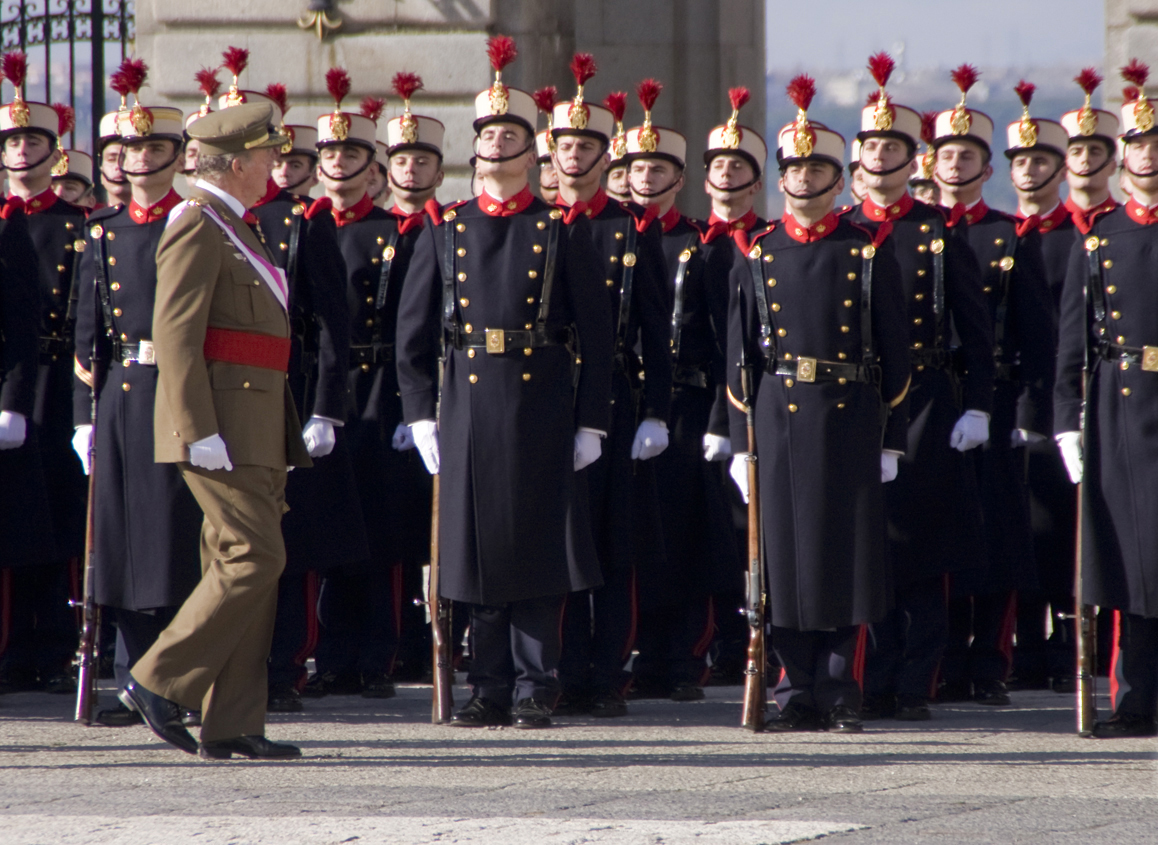
King Juan Carlos I inspecting the Royal Guard during the 2009 Pascua Militar

The primary function of the Royal Guard is to provide military security for the monarchy. In addition to protecting members of the Spanish royal family, the present functions of the unit include the protection of foreign heads of state visiting Spain, and of royal palaces such as the Royal Palace of Madrid (Palacio Real), the Palace of El Pardo and the Palace of Zarzuela.

The regiment is an active combat unit and has been deployed to Bosnia and Afghanistan. The Guard regularly takes part in military exercises organized in conjunction with all three of the main branches of Spain's military.

It is involved in the changing of the guard ceremony (Cambio de la Guardia) at the Royal Palace. It is present at military parades in the national capital of Madrid on official holidays including Fiesta Nacional de España and Día de la Constitución. Annually, it has a troop review during the Pascua Militar ceremony on 6 January.

== Organization ==
Cuirassiers of the Guard in Madrid, 2023

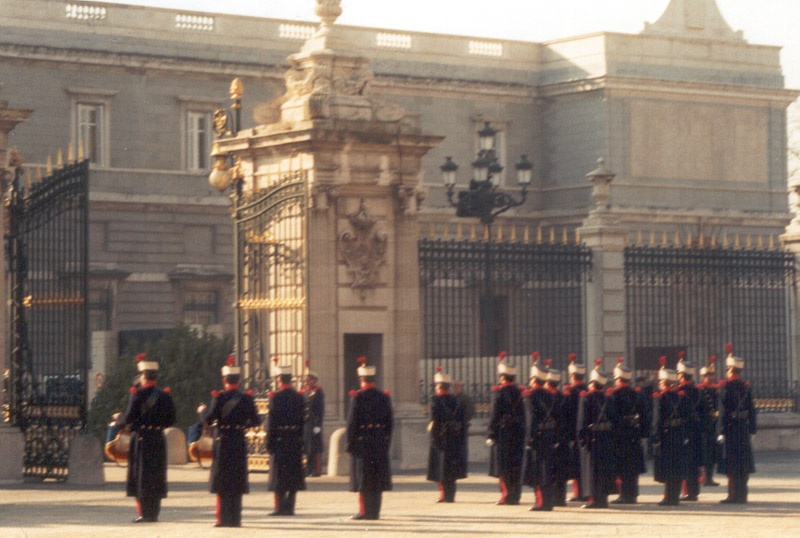
Guard change at the Palacio Real

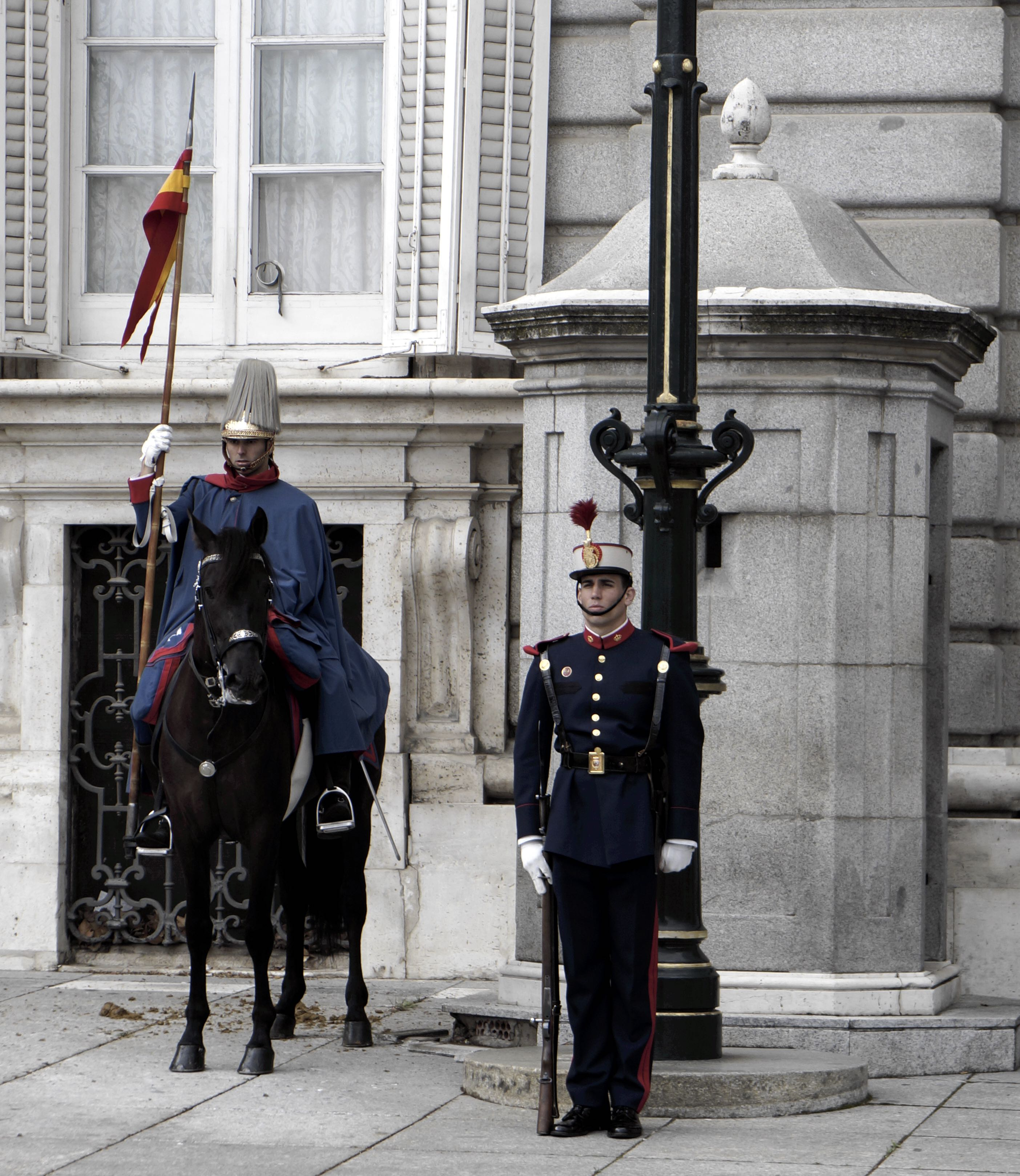
Royal Guards at the main entrance of the Palacio Real

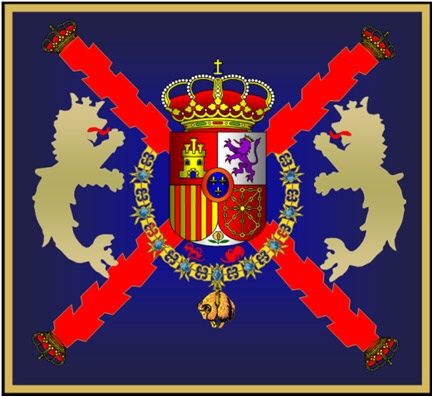
Colours of the Marine company of the Royal Guard

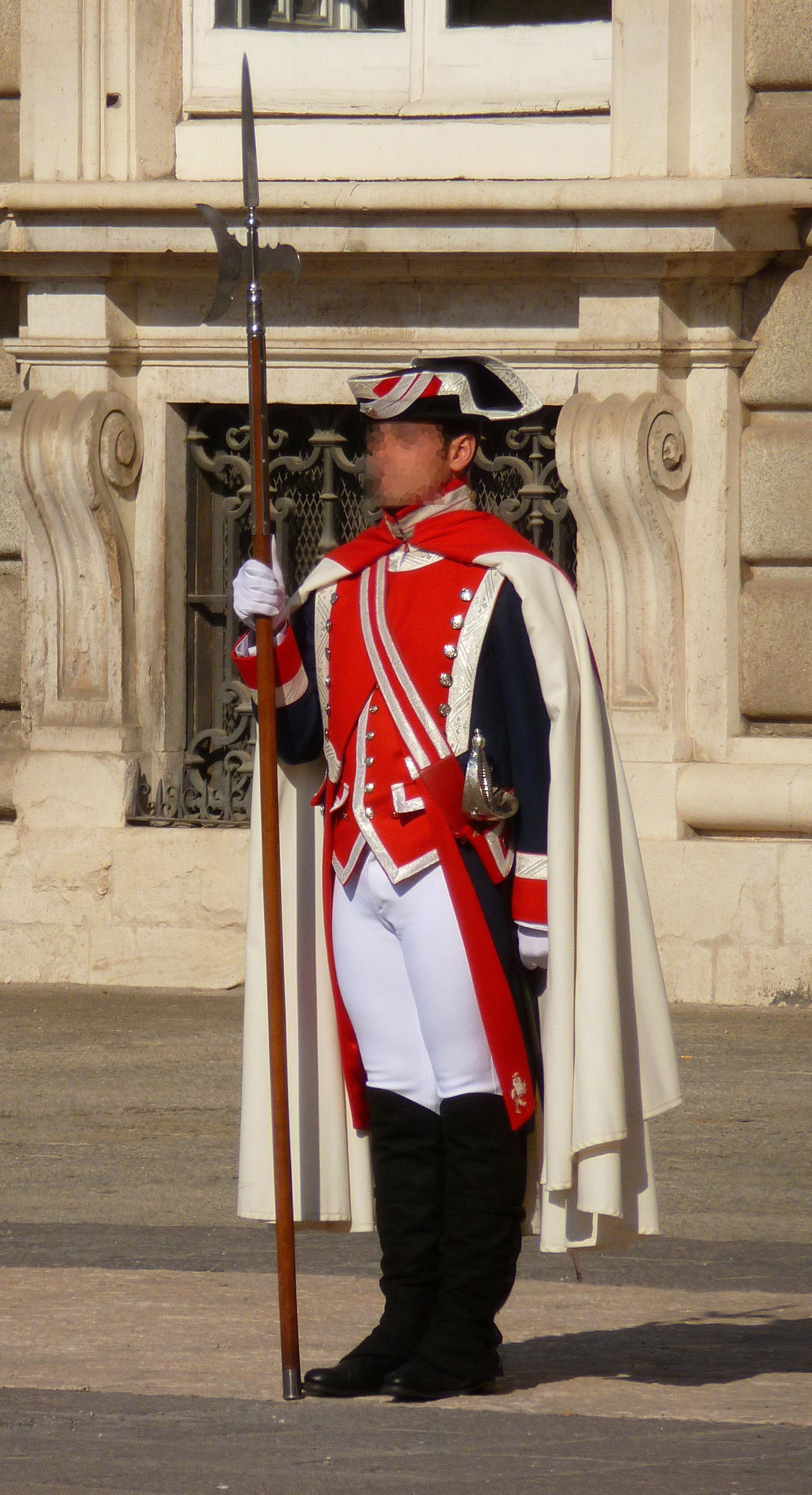
Alabardero (Halberdier) of the Royal Guard

- Commander of the Royal Guard (Colonel)
- General Staff
  - Personnel Logistics (1st SEM)
  - Institutional Affairs (2nd SEM)
  - Security and Intelligence, Preparation and Employment (3rd SEM)
  - Material and Infrastructure Logistics (4th SEM)
  - Economic Affairs Section (SAE)
  - Occupational Risk Prevention Service (SPRL)
  - Legal Advisor (ASEJU)
  - Office of the Sergeant Major of the Royal Guard (SBMY)
  - Religious Service (SRELG)
  - Secretary
- Group HQ
  - HQ Company
  - Security Company
    - 1st Security platoon
    - 2nd Security platoon
    - 3rd Security platoon
    - 4th Security platoon
  - Communications Company
  - Formation Company
    - 1st platoon
    - 2nd platoon
    - 3rd platoon
    - 4th platoon
- Escorts Group
  - Group HQ
  - Military Control Company
    - Perimeter Control Section
    - Interior Control Section
    - Bomb Detection/Attack Dog Section
    - Motorcycle Section
  - Alabarderos (Halberdiers) Company
    - 1st Immediate Security Section
    - 2nd Immediate Security Section
    - Alabarderos Section
  - Royal Escort Squadron
    - Mounted Band of Timpani and Bugles
    - Mounted Marker Squad
    - Cuirassiers Troop
    - 1st Lancers Troop
    - 2nd Lancers Troop
  - Royal Horse Artillery Battery
  - Equestrian Training Unit
- Honors Group
  - Group HQ
  - Army Company "Monteros de Espinosa"
    - 1st Platoon
    - 2nd Platoon
    - 3rd Platoon
    - Drill Team Platoon
  - Navy and Marine Composite Company "Mar Océano"
    - 1st Platoon
    - 2nd Platoon
    - 3rd Platoon
    - 4th platoon
  - Air and Space Force Squadron "Plus Ultra"
    - 1st Flight
    - 2nd Flight
    - 3rd Flight
    - 4th Flight
  - Mountaineering Group
  - Diving Unit
  - Sniper Unit
- Logistics Group
  - Group HQ
  - Administration Company
  - Maintenance Company
  - Transportation Company
  - Logistics Directorates
  - Medical Unit
- Musical Unit of the Armed Forces Royal Guard
  - Musical Unit HQ and High Command
  - Military Band of the Royal Guard of Spain
  - Corps of Drums of the Royal Guard (Drums and bugles)
  - Fife Section and Pipe band
  - Brass band of the Royal Guard
  - Royal Guard Big band
  - Royal Guard Chamber Ensembles

=== Ranks ===
NATO code	OF-10	OF-9	OF-8	OF-7	OF-6	OF-5	OF-4	OF-3	OF-2	OF-1
Spanish Royal Guard
Spanish Royal Guard						Coronel	Teniente coronel	Comandante	Capitán	Teniente	Alférez

Enlisted

NATO code	OR-9		OR-8	OR-7	OR-6	OR-5	OR-4	OR-3	OR-2	OR-1
Spanish Royal Guard
Spanish Royal Guard	Suboficial mayor	Subteniente	Brigada	Sargento primero	Sargento	Cabo mayor	Cabo primero	Cabo	Soldado de primera	Soldado

== See also ==
- Gardes du Corps du Roi (France)
- Republican Guard (France)
- National Republican Guard (Portugal)
- King's Guard, British equivalent
- Royal Household Security Service
