= Wanggung Sumunjang =

Joseon-era royal guards in Korea

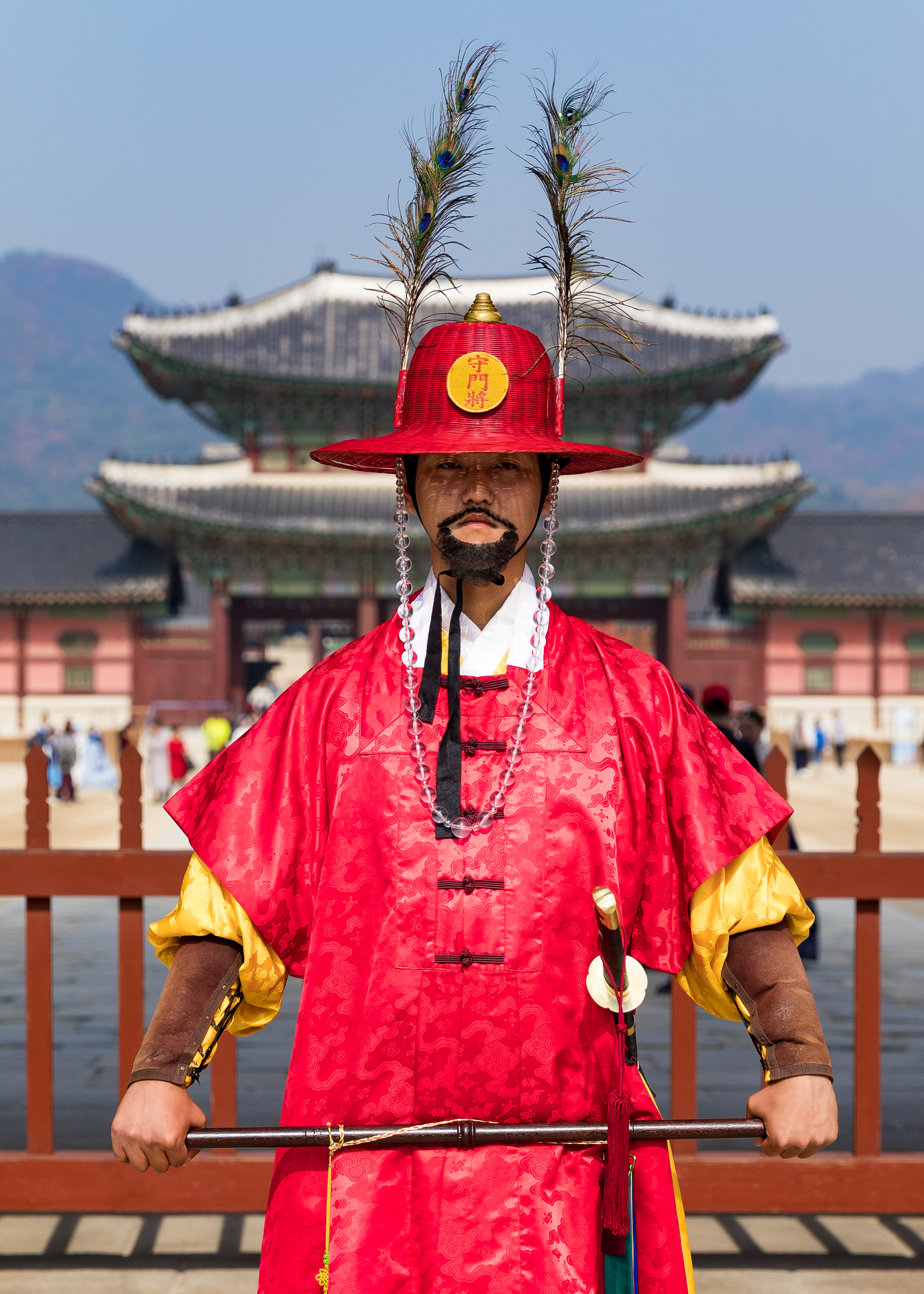
Sumunjang (수문장), Chief gatekeeper of the royal palaces gates.

The Wanggung Sumunjang (Korean: 왕궁수문장; Hanja: 王宮守門將) literally translates as door guard of the royal palace or Sumungun (Korean: 수문군; Hanja: 守門軍) literally translates as military doorkeepers, for short is a royal guard unit of the Joseon Dynasty, whose primary duty is to guard the walls and gates of the Five palaces of Seoul.

== Description ==
The Wanggung Sumunjang were a special unit of the Royal Guards in the Joseon Dynasty of Korea. The Sumungun were responsible for guarding the gates and walls of the five royal palaces and Hanseong's city gates, and would also patrol the surrounding areas to prevent any unauthorized entry. They were highly skilled in martial arts and weaponry, and were trained to use a variety of weapons including swords, spears, and bows. In 1469, King Yejong established the King's Royal Palace Gatekeepers as a separate organization from the main body of the Royal Guards. King Yeongjo established the Sumunjangcheong (守門將廳) to manage them. They were recruited from the commoner class and were often referred to as "commoner soldiers" or "lowborn soldiers", as opposed to the aristocratic soldiers who made up the majority of the Royal Guards. Despite their lower social status, the Sumungun were known for their fierce loyalty to the royal family and their skill in combat. The Sumungun were known for their distinctive uniforms, which included a red jacket with black trim and a black hat with a white feather. Their uniforms were designed to be both practical and stylish, and were often decorated with intricate patterns and designs. In addition to their duties as guards, the Sumungun also played a role in various official ceremonies and events within the royal court. For example, they would participate in military parades and other public events, and would also serve as escorts for members of the royal family.

== Equipment ==
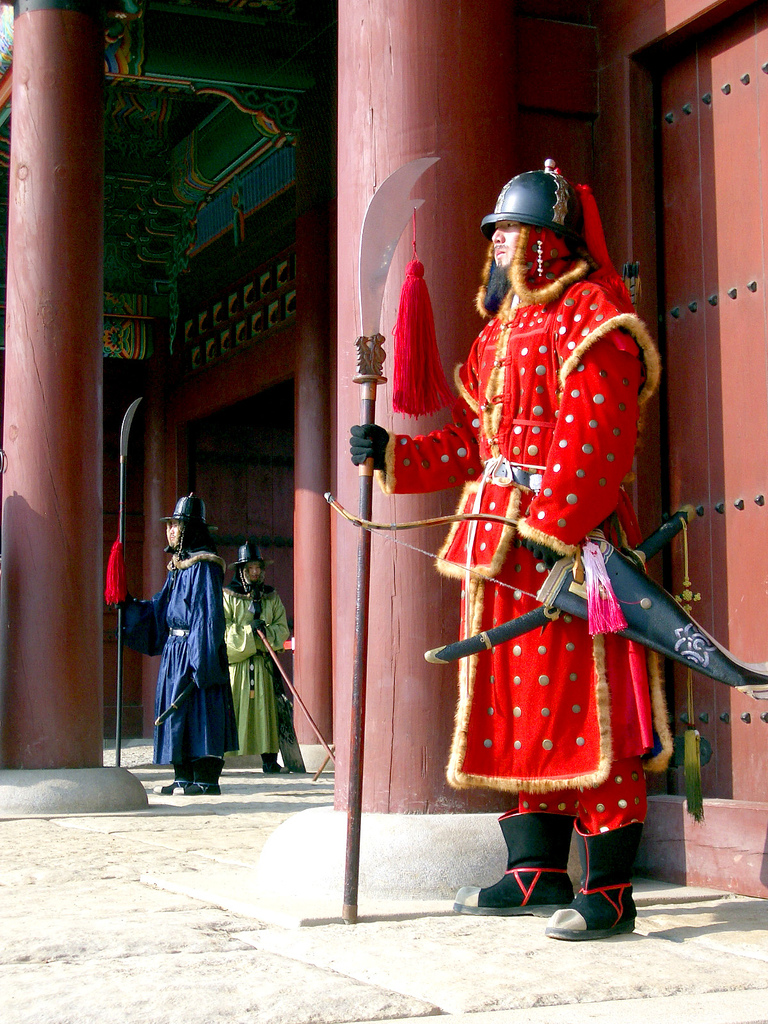
Gapsa (갑사) standing guard wearing dudumiggap armor (Korean: 두두미갑; Hanja: 頭頭味甲).

The guards wore royal uniforms, carried traditional weapons, and played traditional instruments. The Sumunjang and Sujongjang wore and plate and mail armor (gyeongbeongap, Korean: 경번갑; Hanja: 鏡幡甲) and the Gapsa wore dudumiggap (Korean: 두두미갑; Hanja: 頭頭味甲), a ceremonial armor that does not provide protection in battle.

== Ranks ==
The following list is the Sumungun ranks with their roles and duties:

- Sumunjang (수문장): Chief gatekeeper guards the palace gates and commands the Sumungun.
- Sujongjang (수정장): Deputy gatekeeper serves as the Daejonggo, manager of the bells and drums
- Jongsagwan (종사관): Lieutenant gatekeeper who assists the Chief gatekeeper and manages the gate book
- Gapsa (갑사): Armed guard
- Jeongbyeong (정병): Regular guard and private soldier of Joseon's central army
- Daejol (대졸): Subordinate soldier and sentry
- Jeollugun (전루군): Timekeeper
- Chwita (취타): Military band musician

== Gallery ==
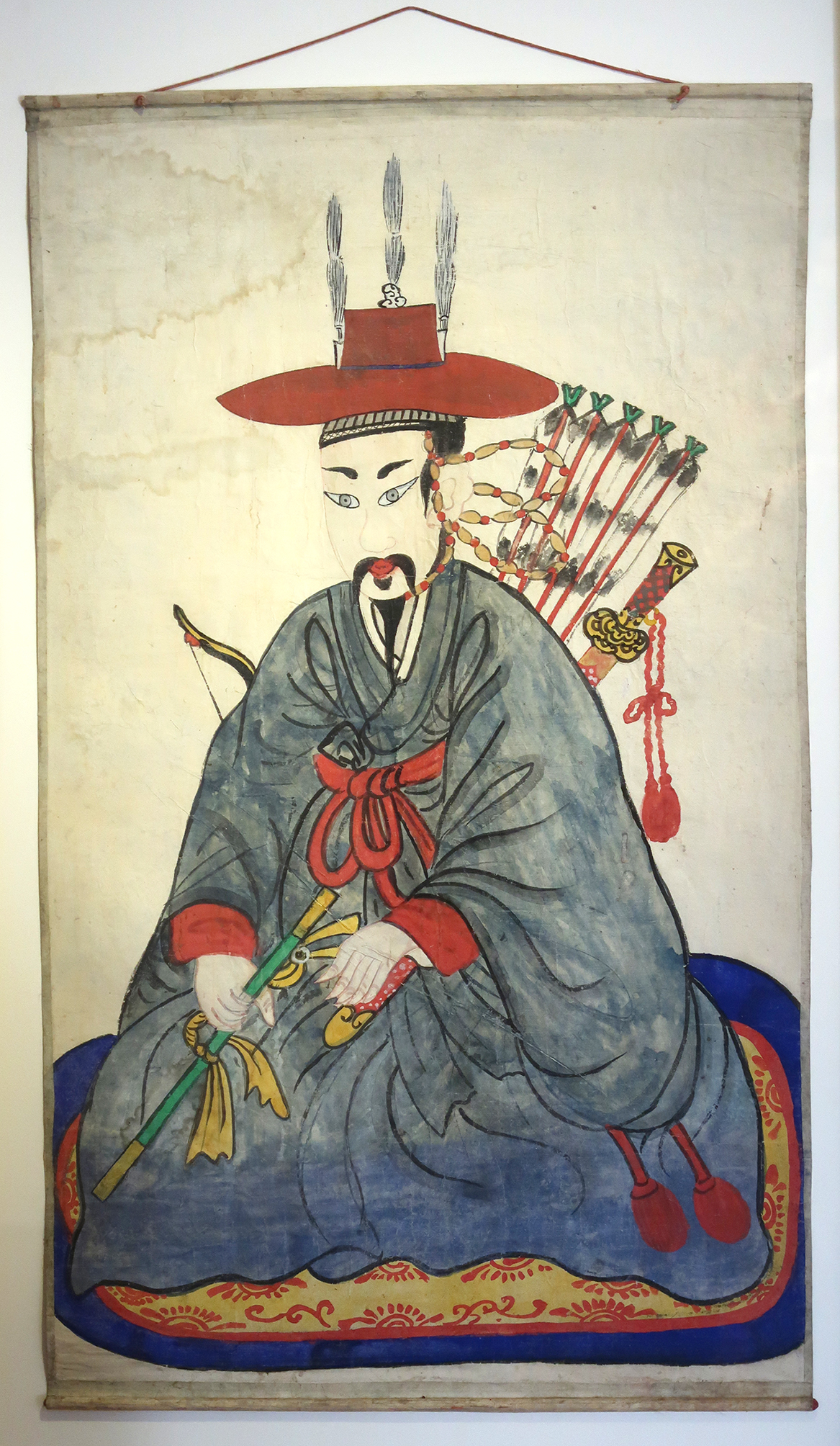

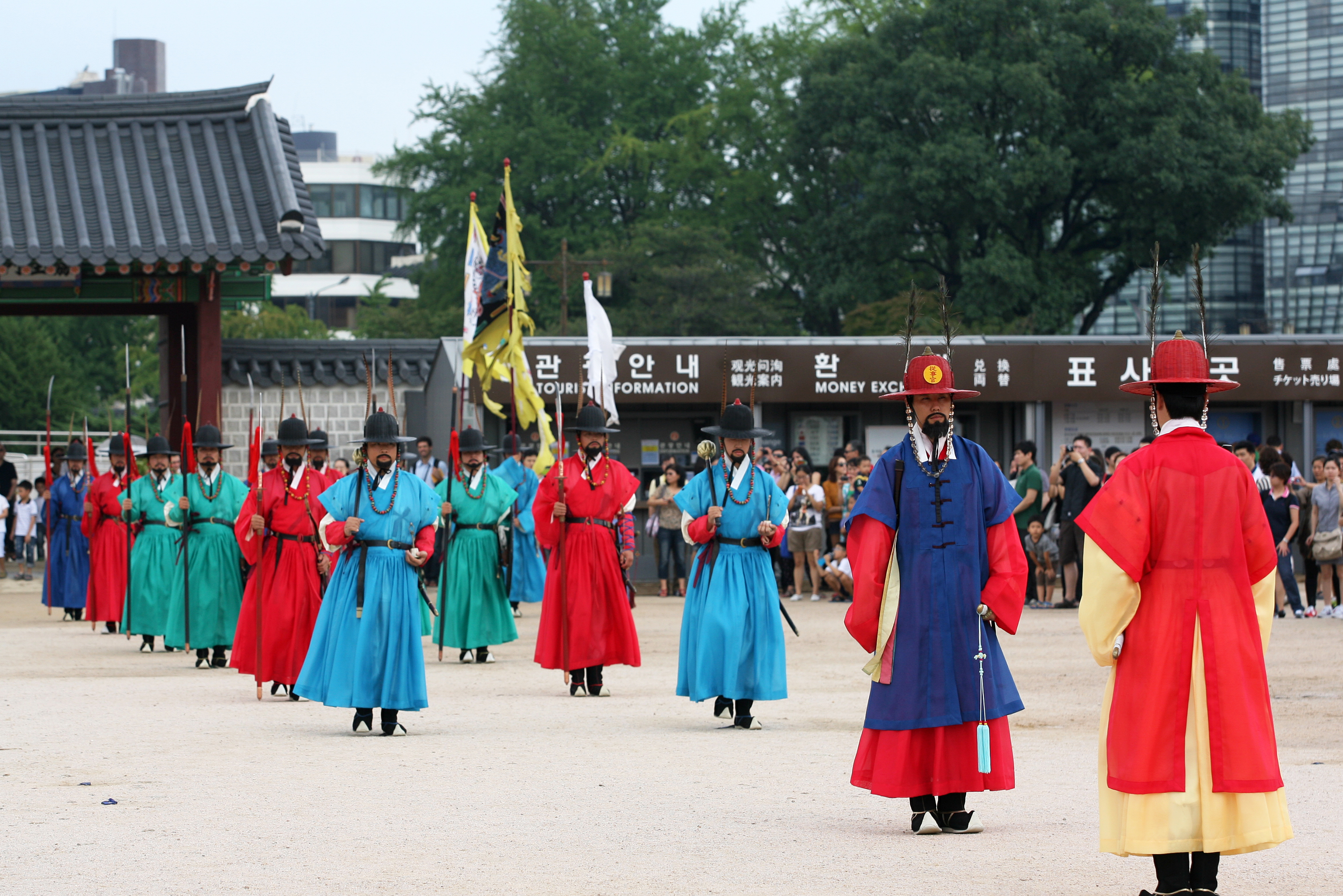

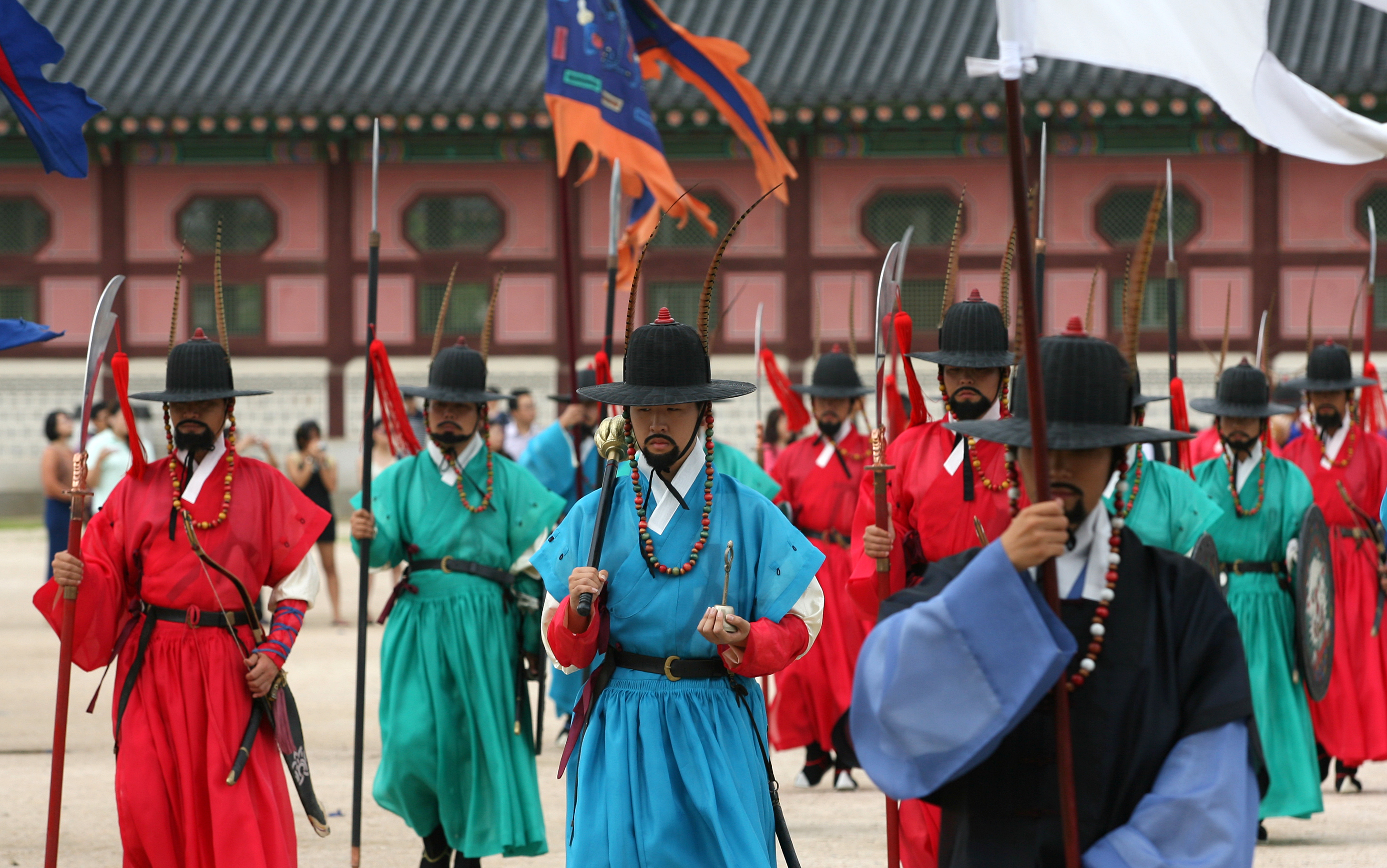

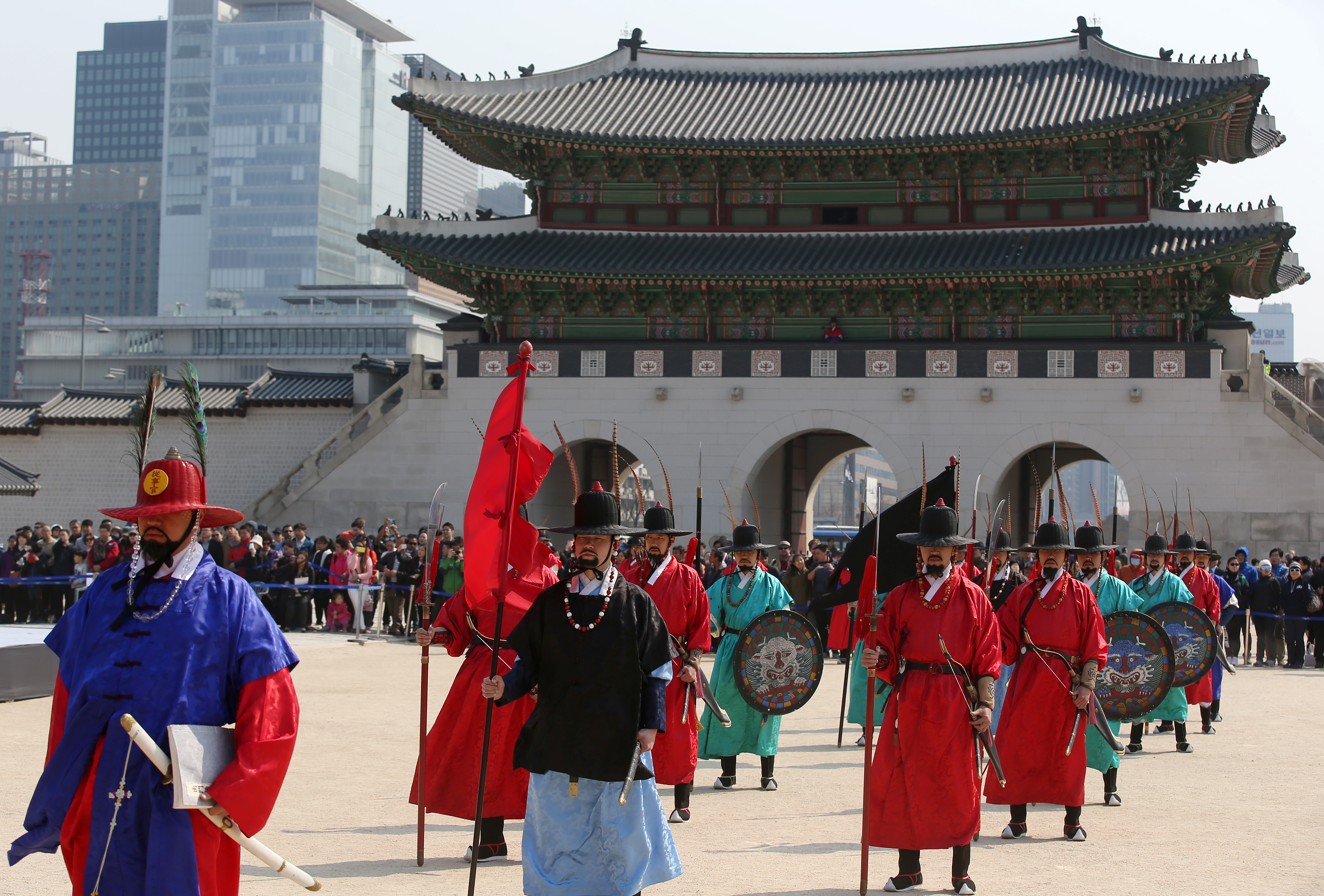

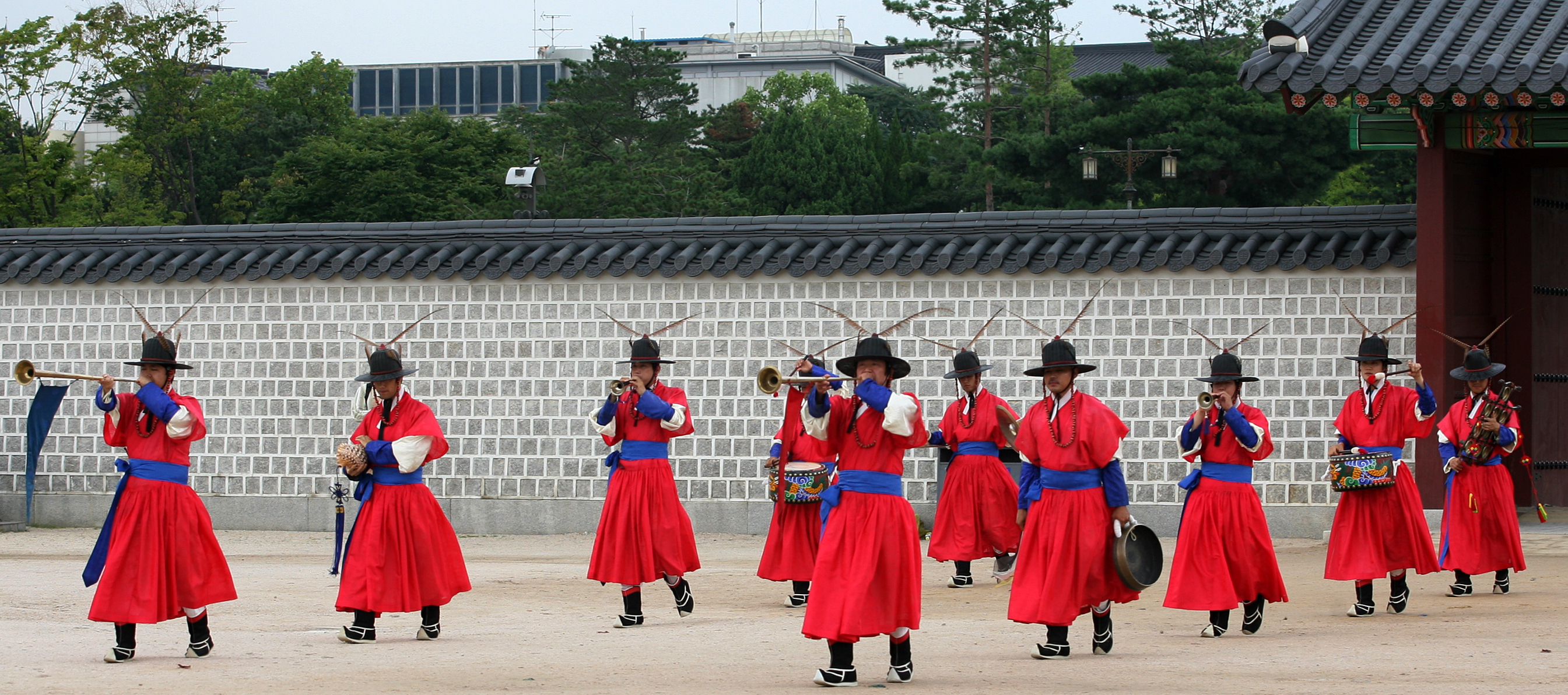

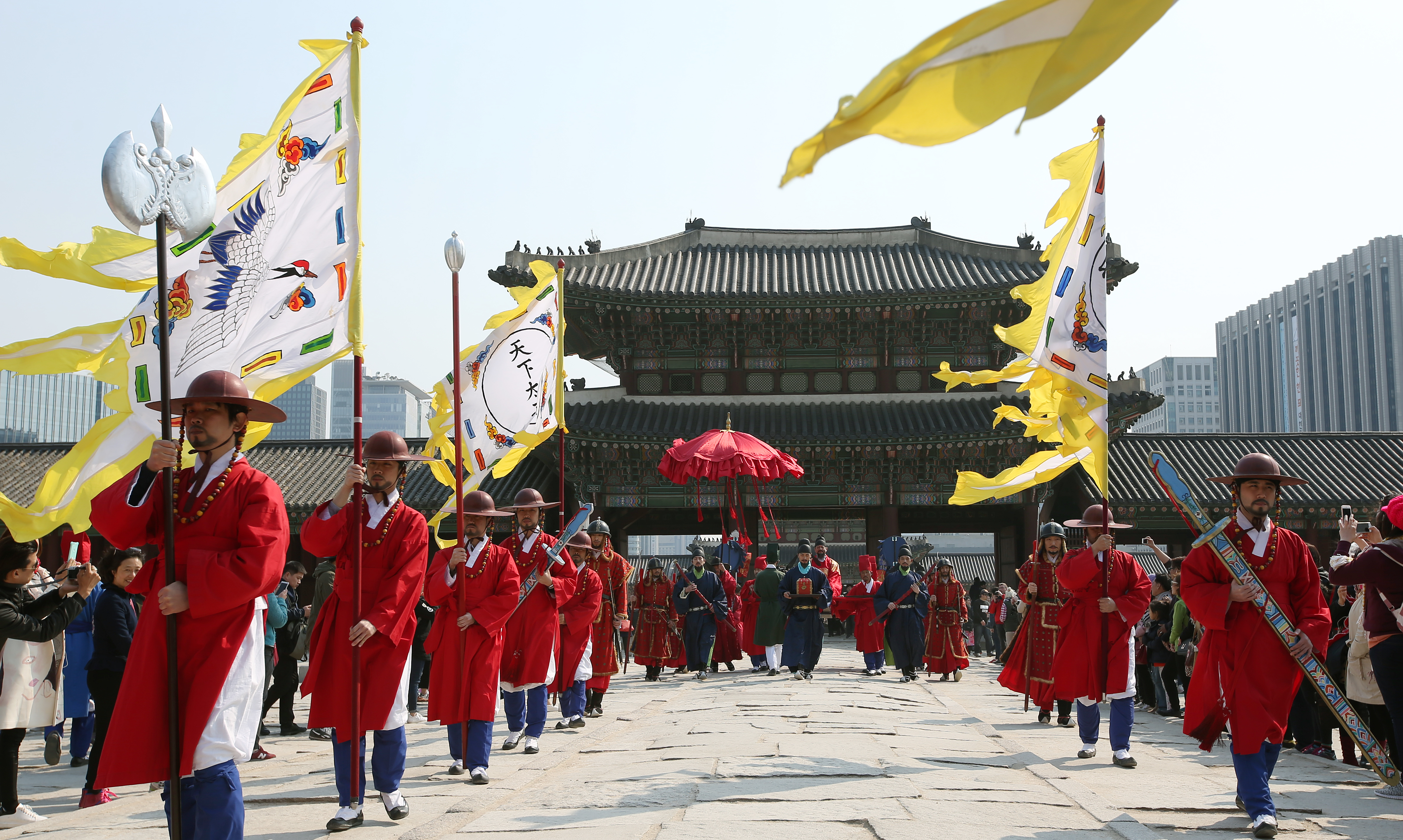

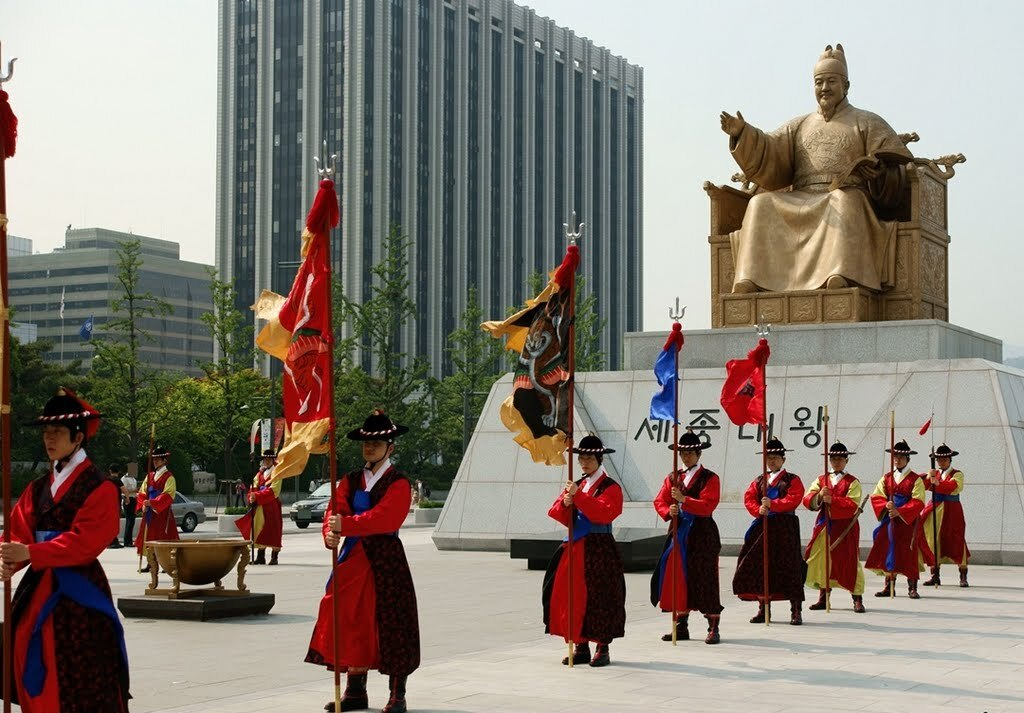

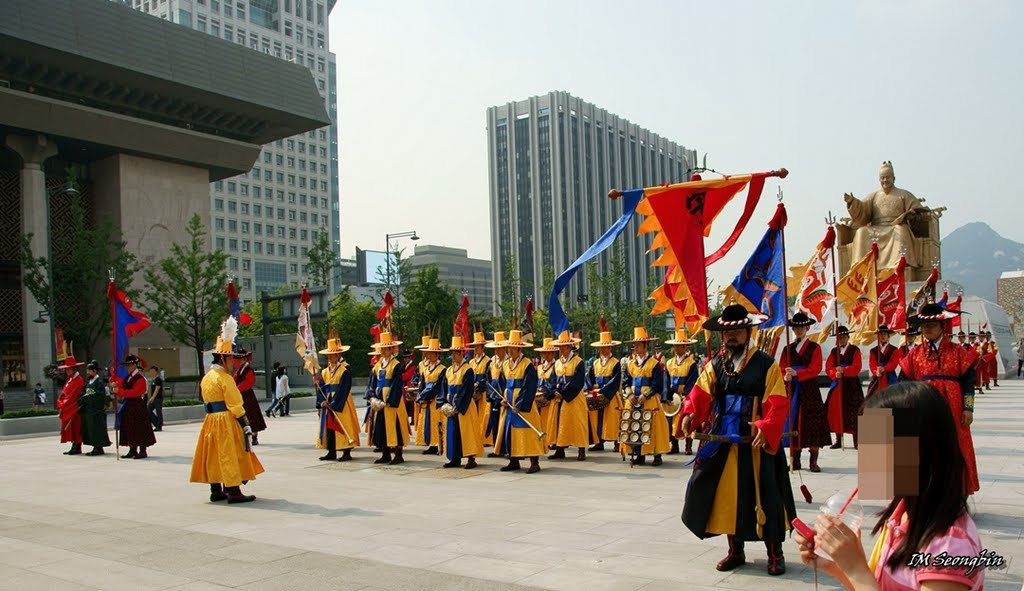

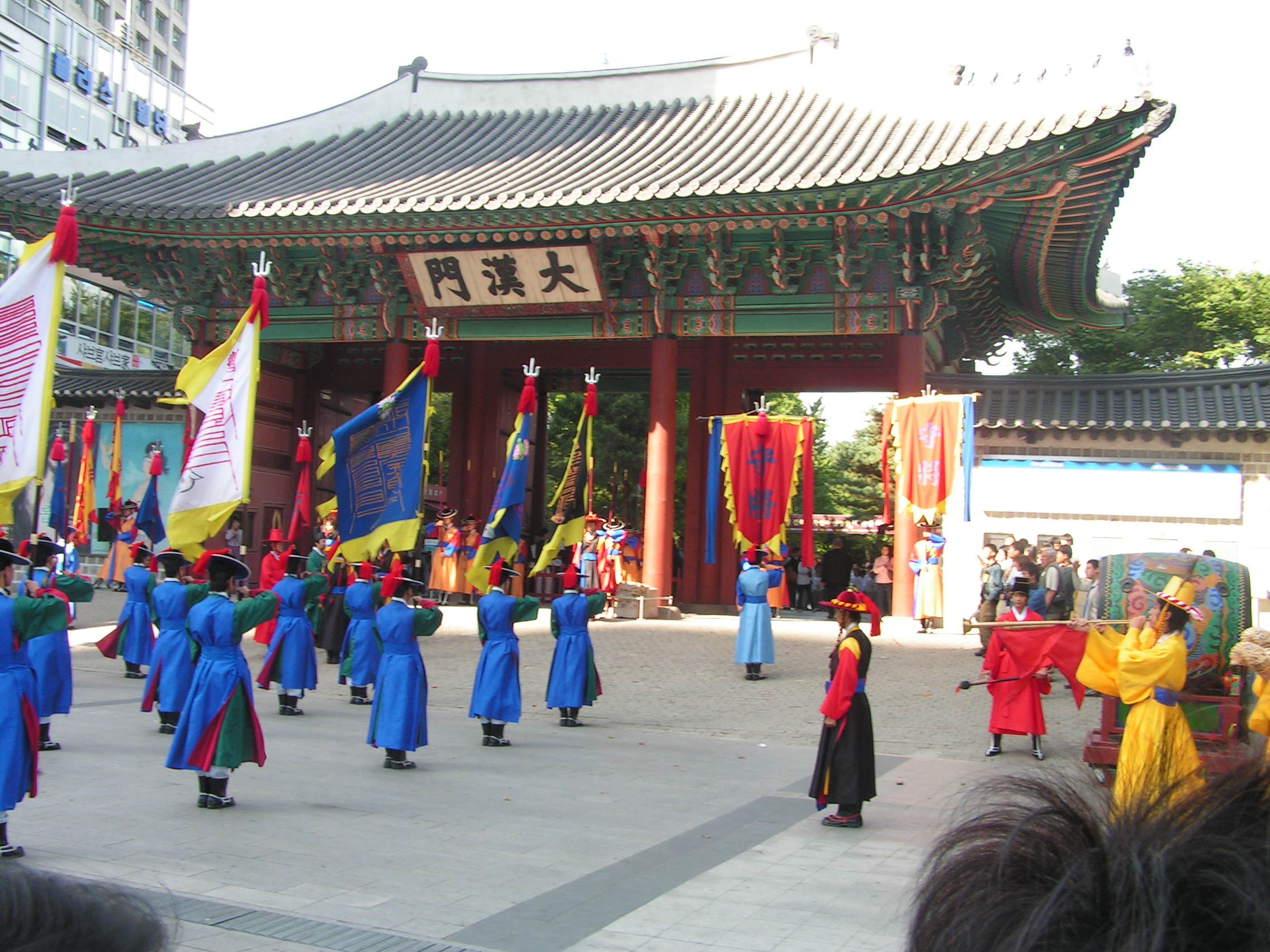

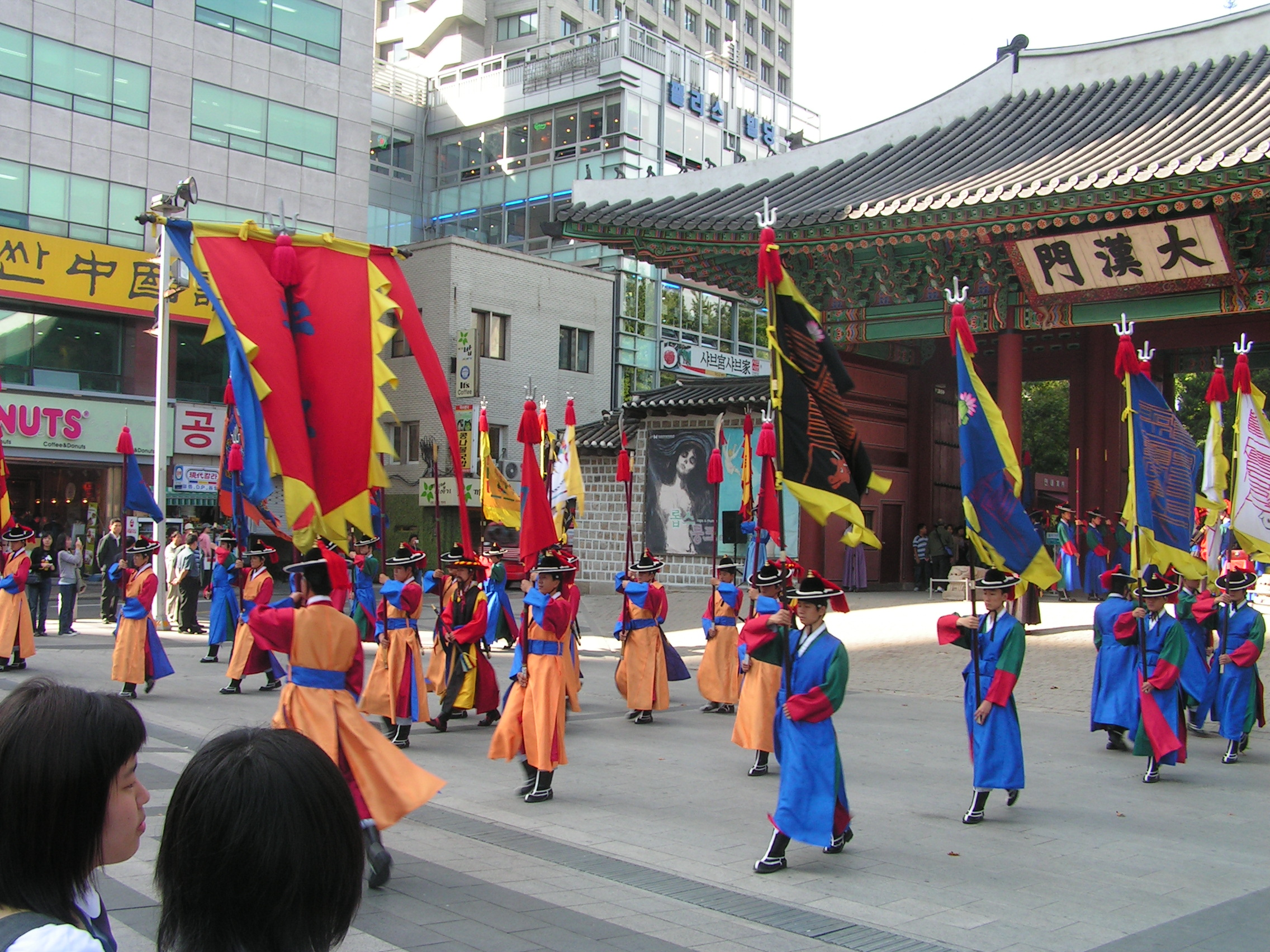

== Re-enactment ==
Guard ceremonies have been reenacted since 1996, and are a major tourist attraction.

== See also ==
- Naegeumwi
- Joseon Army
