= Pascua Militar =

Annual Spanish military ceremony

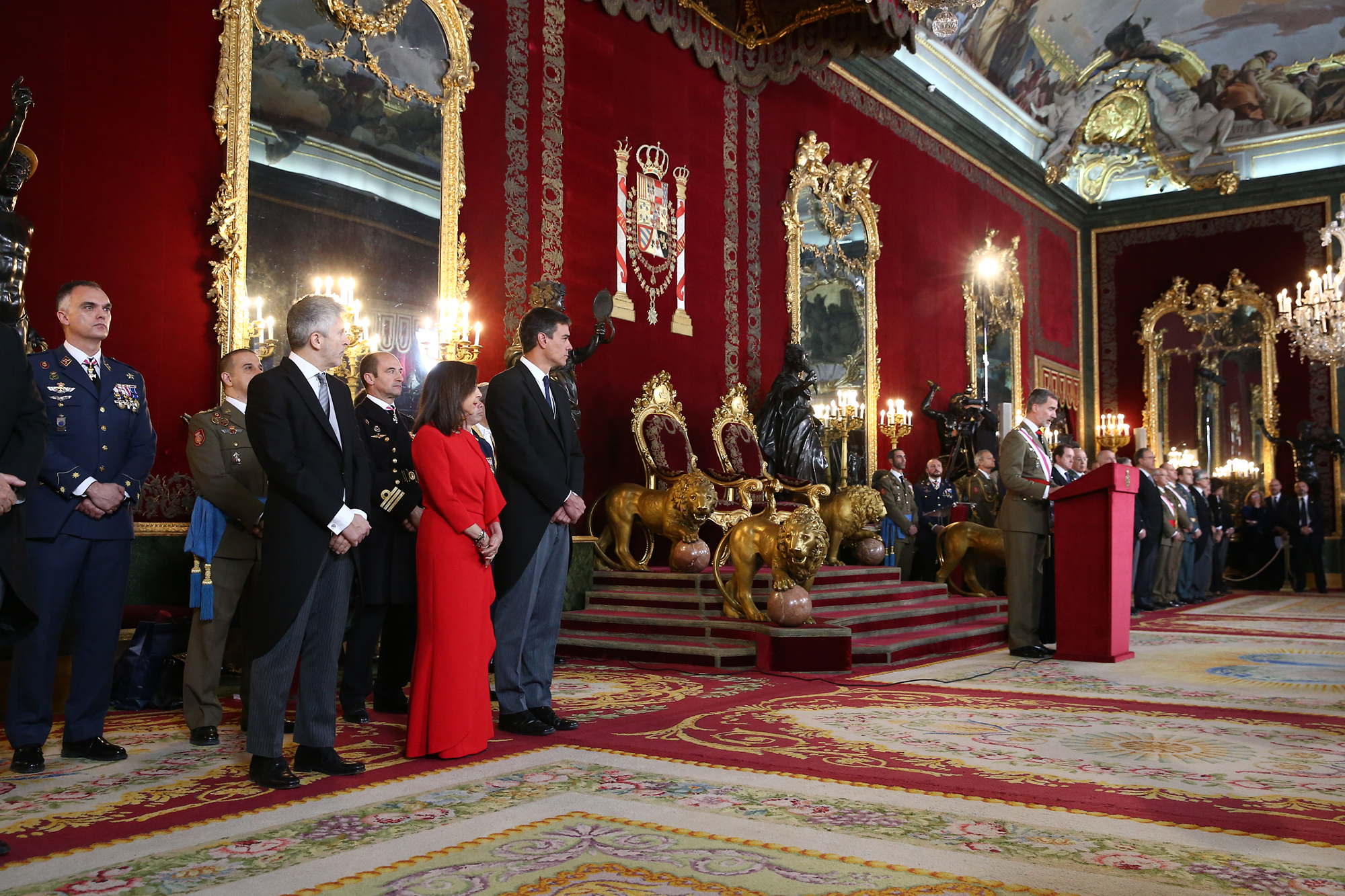
- 2019 Pascua Militar
- Official name: Pascua Militar
- Observed by: Spain
- Significance: It is a military holiday that commemorates the recovery of the city of Mahón and the definitive expulsion of the English from Minorca.
- Celebrations: The Monarch reviews the troops, salutes the civil and military authorities and, together with the Defense Minister, gives a speech.
- Date: January 6
- Frequency: annual
- Related to: Epiphany

The Pascua Militar (transl. Military Easter) is a military ceremony that takes place every 6 January in the Throne Room of the Royal Palace of Madrid. The King of Spain receives the Prime Minister, the Minister of Defence, the Chief of the Defence Staff, the Chiefs of Staff of all branches, the Grand Masters of the Royal and Military Orders of San Fernando and San Hermenegildo, the Civil Guard chiefs and the Spanish Veterans Brotherhood.

The holiday begins with the review of the troops (composed mainly by the Royal Guard) by the Monarch in the courtyard of the Royal Palace after being saluted by the Prime Minister and the Chiefs of Staff. After this, they go to the Throne Room of the Royal Palace where the Monarch rewards some military officers. During this day, both the Monarch and the Defence Minister hold speeches to the Government, the highest officers of the Armed Forces and other authorities. These speeches usually reflect the Spanish political and geostrategic situation.

Along with Madrid, the holiday is celebrated in the rest of the country in the different military headquarters.

== Origin ==
King Charles III established this ceremony on the occasion of the recapture of Menorca from the British, carried out by a Franco-Spanish army of 52 ships in 1782 and the Spanish Navy Marines. As an expression of joy, Charles III ordered the Viceroys, Captain Generals, Governors and Military commanders to gather the garrisons at the feast of the Epiphany and to notify their commanders and officers of the armies of their congratulations on their behalf. The Military Easter has gone from being a historical memory to a solemn and important military act with which the military year begins, a balance is made of the previous year and the lines of action to be developed are marked in which it begins.

== Criticism ==
The Chief of the Defence Staff between 2008 and 2012 in Spain, Julio Rodríguez, is of the opinion that this event could be an opportunity to open up the Spanish Armies to the public, instead of keeping a ceremony closed just for the military. Professional associations of armed forces (the nearest to a union for the Spanish military) and the Military Life Observatory (Observatorio para la Vida Militar) should take part on it, according to Rodríguez.

== See also ==
- Three Kings Day
- Holidays of Spain
- Monarchy of Spain
