= Monteros de Espinosa =

Babel Tower, by Pieter Brueghel the Elder. Dutch Allegory to the Habsburg Emperor, escorted by his castilian Monteros.

The Monteros de Espinosa are the oldest Bodyguard unit of Royal Guards in medieval Western Europe. They were founded by the Counts of Castile around the year 1006 and kept in service by the Castilian Sovereigns and posterior Dynasties that inherited their Kingdoms and united with. It is still serves part of the Spanish Guardia Real.

Originally a small tight unit of five to nine men who like their contemporary Houscarls or the Somatophylakes of Alexander the Great accompanied the Counts and later Kings everywhere, it was raised successively to their highest number in times of the Emperor Charles who extended their number from 48 to 75 in order to take custody night and day of his Queen Mother Joan, the Mad. They had no other officer than the King himself as its Captain and in his absence the King's Right Arm was its Lieutenant.

It was a privilege reserved only for the local Hidalgos of the oldest mountainous districts of the County of Castile at the time of its foundation. In particular, membership was reserved to hidalgos born in or around Espinosa, the town in northern Burgos that gave its name to the unit. These hidalgos could ask for or be asked by the Crown for its service at any time.

With time, their service was limited to night time and to the most sensitive occasions, distinguished with the Honour of watching the Monarchs closest privy Chambers and having direct custody of the Royal persons during sickness, as well as watching and carrying from the moment of death the Royal Corpses to their burial. Birth, Baptism, Marriage and Coronation- all among the most intimate aspects of Guard duties.

With time, their functions became less military and mostly like the Gentlemen at Arms and the Yeomen of the Guard limited to Palace duty. The last time they were in campaign escorting their Monarch in the field was in the side of Carlos VII during the Carlist Wars.
