= National Guard =

Various uniformed organizations

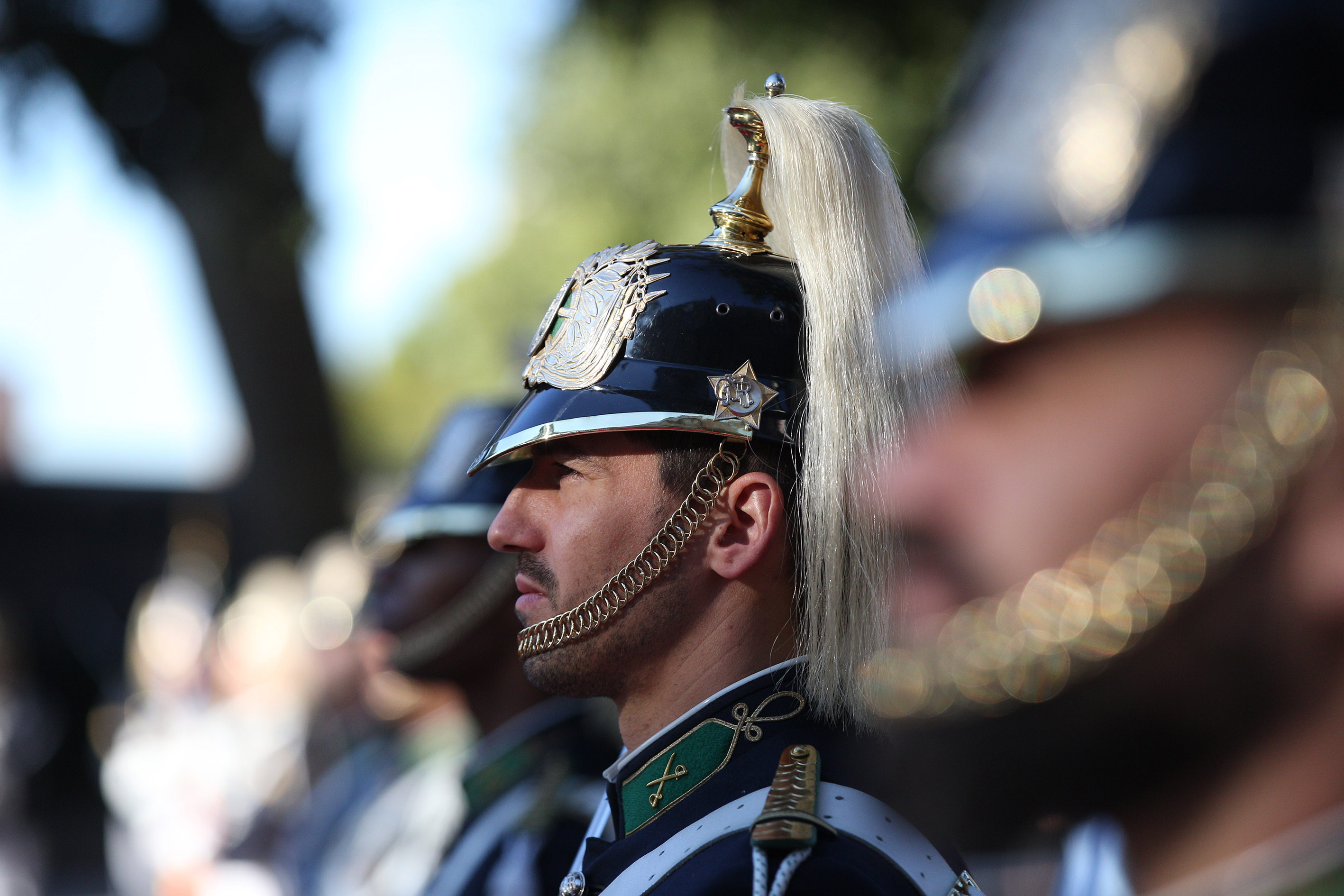
Members of the Portuguese National Republican Guard (GNR).

National guard is the name used by a wide variety of current and historical uniformed organizations in different countries. The original National Guard was formed during the French Revolution around a cadre of defectors from the French Guards.

National Guard may refer to:

== Africa ==
- National Guard (Mauritania)
- Tunisian National Guard, a separate military force of Tunisia

== Asia ==
- Azerbaijani National Guard, an armed force of the Government of Azerbaijan, and operates as a semi-independent entity
- National Guard (Bahrain), a separate military force in Bahrain that serves both as defence force and as a security force
- Cypriot National Guard, combined arms military force of the Republic of Cyprus
- National Guard of Georgia, a military structure within the Georgian Armed Forces
- National Security Guard, India
- National Guard (Iraq), part of the new Military of Iraq absorbed by the Iraqi Army
- National Guard of Israel
- National Guard of Kazakhstan
- Kuwait National Guard, an internal and border security force, part of Kuwait Military Forces
- National Guard (Kyrgyzstan), one of the branches of the Armed Forces of the Kyrgyz Republic
- National Guard (Pakistan), a paramilitary force mainly charged with border patrols and air defences
- Saudi Arabian National Guard, one of the three major branches of the Armed Forces of the Kingdom of Saudi Arabia
- Sri Lanka National Guard, the largest regiment in the Sri Lanka Army
- Syria
  - National Guard of the Ba'ath Party, former Ba'athist militia in Syria
  - National Guard (Suwayda), a local alliance in Syria
- National Guard (Tajikistan), a special operations branch of the Tajikistani Armed Forces
- Turkmen National Guard
- Uzbekistan National Guard

== Europe ==
- National Guards Unit of Bulgaria, successor of the Personal Cavalry Convoy of Knyaz Alexander I, re-established in 2001
- Home Guard (Denmark), volunteer defense force from after Danish resistance groups from second world war. It is divided into army, air and naval home guards.
- Estonian Defence League, unified paramilitary armed forces of the Republic of Estonia
- White Guard (Finland) (1918–1944), voluntary militia of the "Whites", who opposed the "Reds" in the Finnish Civil War of 1918
- National Guard (France), militias formed in each city from the time of the French Revolution to the Paris Commune, re-established after several terrorist attacks in 2016
- National Guard (Greece), a military structure within the Hellenic Army
- National Guard (Ireland), better known as the Blueshirts, a 1930s political movement in Ireland
- National Republican Guard (Italy), (1943–1945), a paramilitary force of the Italian Social Republic
- Latvian National Guard, a volunteer paramilitary armed force, part of National Armed Forces of Latvia
- National Guard (Poland), a Polish law enforcement unit during the November Uprising
- National Republican Guard (Portugal), the gendarmerie of Portugal
- National Guard of Russia, gendarmerie force of Russia, formed in 2016
- National Militia (Spain), 19th century quasi-military force
- National Guard of Ukraine, formed 1991–2000 and 2014–current
- United Kingdom
  - Fencibles, c. 1759 – c.1802
  - Home Guard (United Kingdom), 1940–1944
    - GHQ Auxiliary Units, 1940–1944
  - Home Service Force, 1982–1993

== North America ==
- National Guard (El Salvador) (1912–1992), the Salvadoran gendarmerie
- National Guard (Mexico), a gendarmerie created in 2019
- National Guard (Nicaragua) (1925–1979), a militia and gendarmerie created during the occupation by the United States
- National Guard (Panama) (1946–1990) (Guardia Nacional), were the armed forces of the Republic of Panama. Later re-organized as the Panama Defense Forces
- National Guard (United States), military reserves organized by each of the 50 U.S. states, territories, D.C. and administered by the National Guard Bureau;
  - Air National Guard, a reserve force of the United States Air Force which functions as the air component of the state-level militia while not in federal service
  - Army National Guard, a reserve force of the United States Army which functions as the ground component of the state-level militia while not in federal service

== South America ==
- National Guard (Brazil) (1831–1918), a paramilitary militia created to support the Brazilian Army
- Venezuelan National Guard (Guardia Nacional de Venezuela), the gendarmerie component of the National Armed Forces of Venezuela

== See also ==
- Army Reserve (United Kingdom)
- Internal troops
- Military reserve force
- Presidential Guard (disambiguation)
- Republican guard
