= Naegeumwi =

1392–1910 Korean royal guard

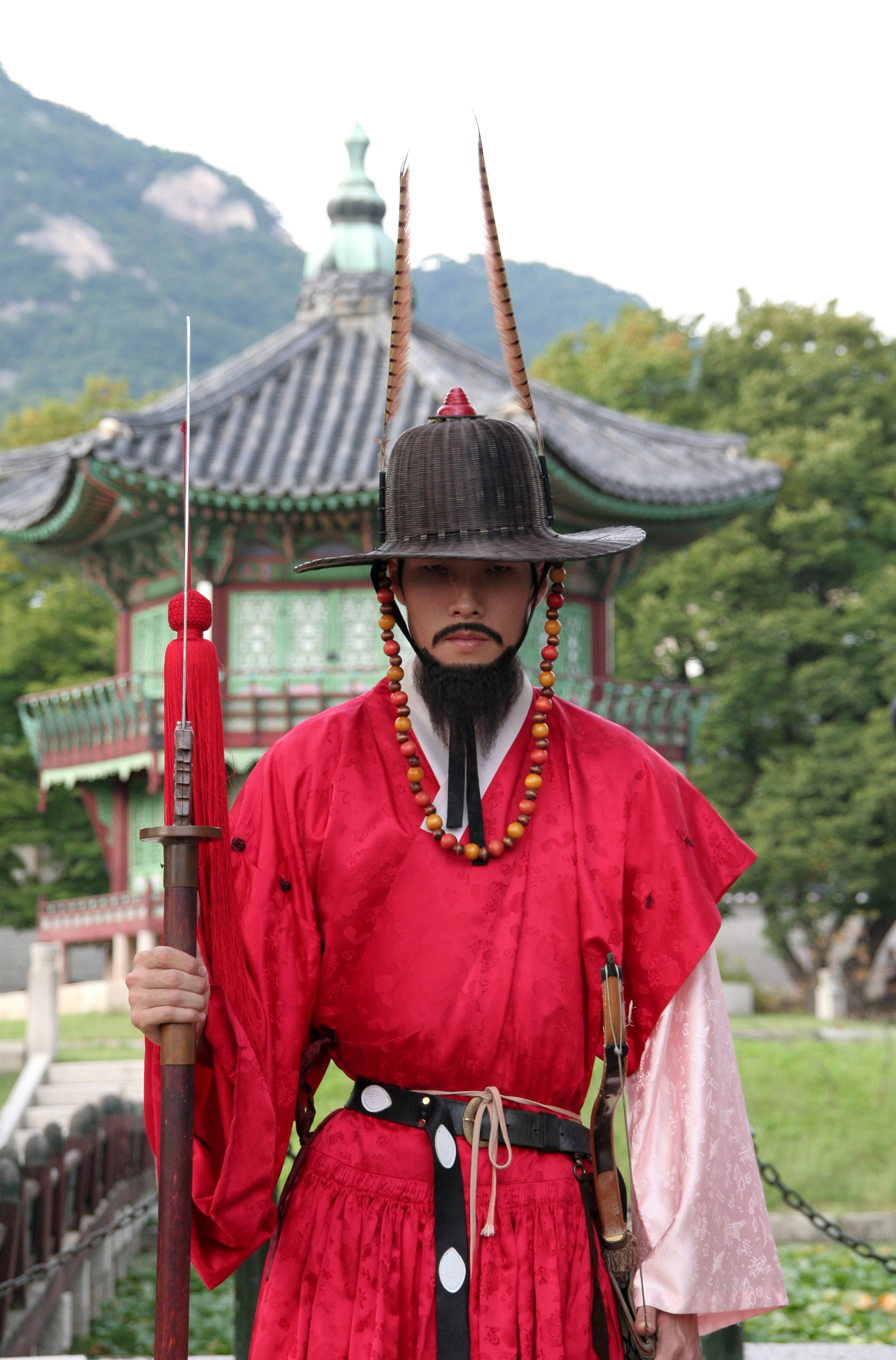
Korean royal guard at Gyeongbokgung Palace during a re-enactment

Naegeumwi (Korean: 내금위; Hanja: 內禁衛) was a military unit during the Joseon Dynasty period of Korean history between 1392 and 1910, responsible for protecting the king and the royal family. The number of royal guards varied between 60 and 200, at times may have reached 300.

== Inspection ceremony ==
The monarch held random inspections of the royal guards, with the tolling of the Cheobjong bell(첩종,疊鐘), which notified the guards that the king was approaching Gwanghwamun Gate. The bell could be heard in central Seoul, as well.

The guards had to line up in formation and display their combat skills and tactical skills, according to the Owijinbeob (오위진법,五衛陣法), which was a contemporary document recording various movements and strategies, considered to be the most modern at the time.

The royal guards had to defend the east side of the field (the king's left side), during a mock battle with the Gyeomsabok (겸사복,兼司僕) cavalry units, who would attack from the right (west) side. At the end of the inspection the king would display his displeasure or satisfaction with the skills and performance of the Naegeumwi.

== Re-enactments ==
The royal guard system was dissolved in 1910. In modern days, re-enactments of the royal guards' inspection ceremony are performed for tourists at the Gyeongbokgung Palace during high season.

== See also ==
- Wanggung Sumunjang
- Joseon Army
