= Republican guard =

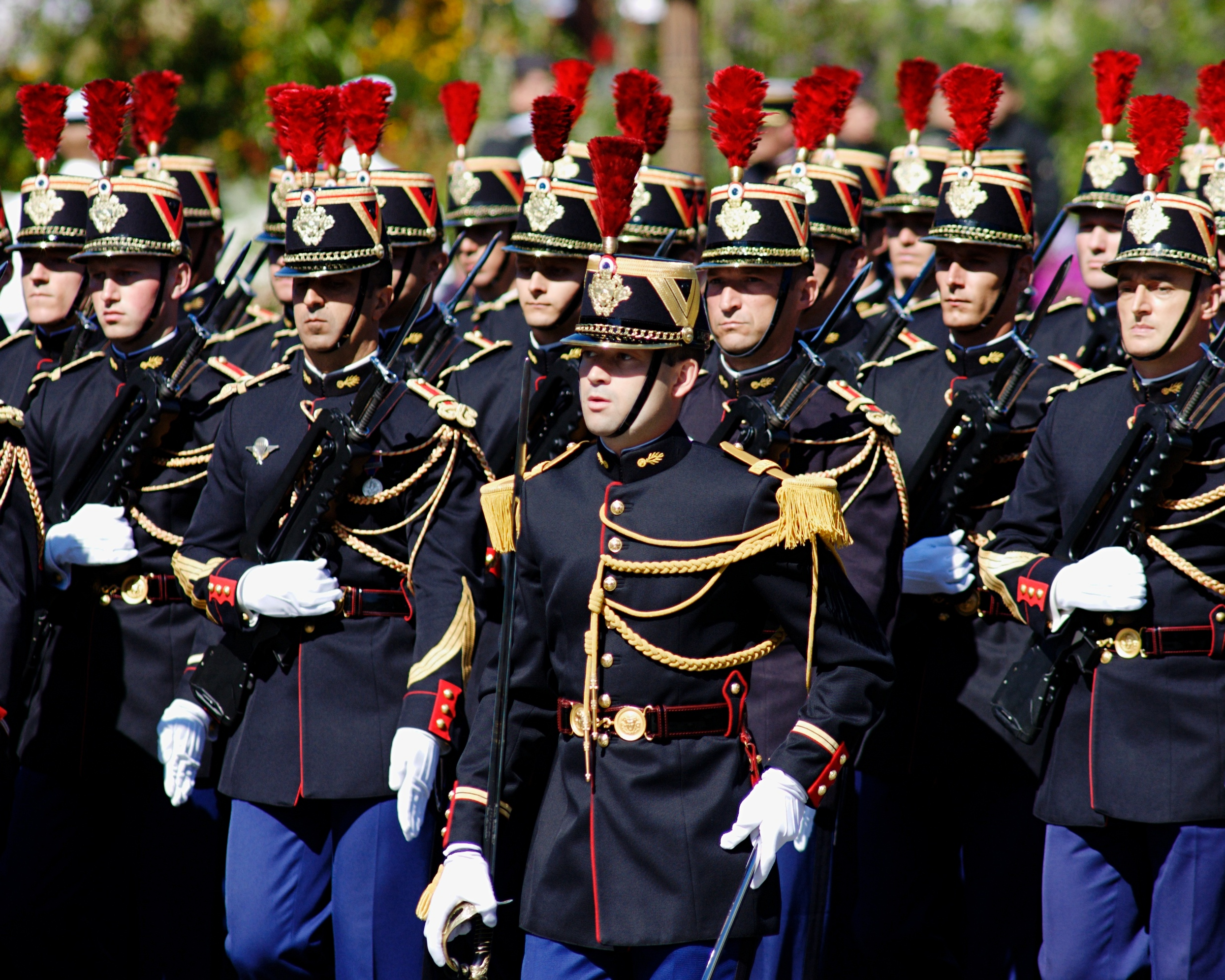
The French Republican Guard.

A republican guard, sometimes called a national guard, is a state organization of a country (often a republic, hence the name Republican) which typically serves to protect the head of state and the government, and thus is often synonymous with a presidential guard. The term is derived from the original French Gendarmerie unit. Several other countries also have adopted the term and have active guard units. Republican Guards may be purely ceremonial units providing close protection to heads of states during functions and parades or be full time protective security units.

== Active republican guard units ==
- (Albania) Albanian Republican Guard
- (Algeria) Algerian Republican Guard
- Congolese Republican Guard — Protects President Félix Tshisekedi of the Democratic Republic of the Congo.
- (Egypt) Egyptian Republican Guard
- (Ethiopia) Ethiopian Republican Guard
- (France) French Republican Guard — The original Republican Guard, serves as an honor guard and defends Paris. Part of the French Gendarmerie.
- (Gabon) Gabonese Republican Guard
- (Guinea) Guinean Republican Guard
- (The Gambia) Gambian Republican National Guard
- (Ivory Coast) Ivorian Republican Guard
- Republican Guard of Kazakhstan — A separate branch of the Armed Forces of the Republic of Kazakhstan.
- Lebanese Republican Guard — A military force of the Directorate-General of the Presidency of Lebanon.
- (Portugal) Portuguese National Republican Guard
- (Sudan) Sudanese Republican Guard
- (Syria) Syrian Republican Guard
- (Togo) Togolese Republican Guard
- (Yemen) Yemeni Republican Guard

== Other republican guards ==
- (Afghanistan) Afghan National Guard (1988–1992)
- (Central African Republic) Central African Republican Guard
- Republican Guard (Donetsk People's Republic) (subsequently incorporated into Russian Ground Forces and renamed).
- (Dutch Republic) Dutch Blue Guards (defunct 1795)
- (Ba'athist Iraq) Iraqi Republican Guard (1969—2003)
  - Iraqi Special Republican Guard (1992/1995—2003) — A military force formed from the Iraqi Republican Guard and charged with Saddam Hussein's protection.
- (Ba'athist Syria) Syrian Republican Guard (1976—2024)
- (Italy) Italian National Republican Guard (1943—1945)
- (Peru) Peruvian Republican Guard (1919—1988)
- Moldovan Republican Guard (precursor of Armed Forces of the Republic of Moldova)
- (South Ossetia) South Ossetian Republican Guard
- Transnistrian Republican Guard (precursor of Armed Forces of Transnistria)
- (Second Spanish Republic) Spanish National Republican Guard (1936—1937)

== See also ==
- Presidential Guard (disambiguation)
- National Guard
