= Presidential Guard =

Presidential Guard may refer to:

== Current units ==
- Presidential Guard Unit (Angola)
- President Guard Regiment, Bangladesh
- Presidential Security Service (Belarus)
- Bolivian Colorados Regiment
- Presidential Guard Battalion (Brazil)
- Presidential Guard (Cameroon)
- La Moneda Palace Guard, Chile
- 37th Infantry Presidential Guard Battalion, Colombia
- Presidential Guard Unit (Cyprus)
- President's Own Guard Regiment, Ghana
- Presidential Guard (Greece)
- President's Bodyguard (India)
- Presidential Security Force of Indonesia
- Libyan Presidential Guard
- State Protection and Guard Service of Moldova
- Presidential Guards Brigade (Nigeria)
- President's Bodyguard (Pakistan)
- Palestinian Presidential Guard
- Presidential Security Command, Philippines
- Kremlin Regiment, Russia
- Saudi Arabian National Guard
- Saudi Royal Guard Regiment
- National Guard (Tajikistan)
- Presidential Guard Brigade (Uganda)
- United Arab Emirates Presidential Guard
- United States Secret Service
- White House Marine Sentries
- Presidential Guard (Zimbabwe)

== Former units ==
- Regiment of Presidential Security, Burkina Faso
- Estado Mayor Presidencial, Mexico
- Presidential Guard (South Vietnam)
- Presidential Guard Regiment (Turkey)
- Special Presidential Division, Zaire

== See also ==
- Republican guard
- Royal guard
