= La Mira =

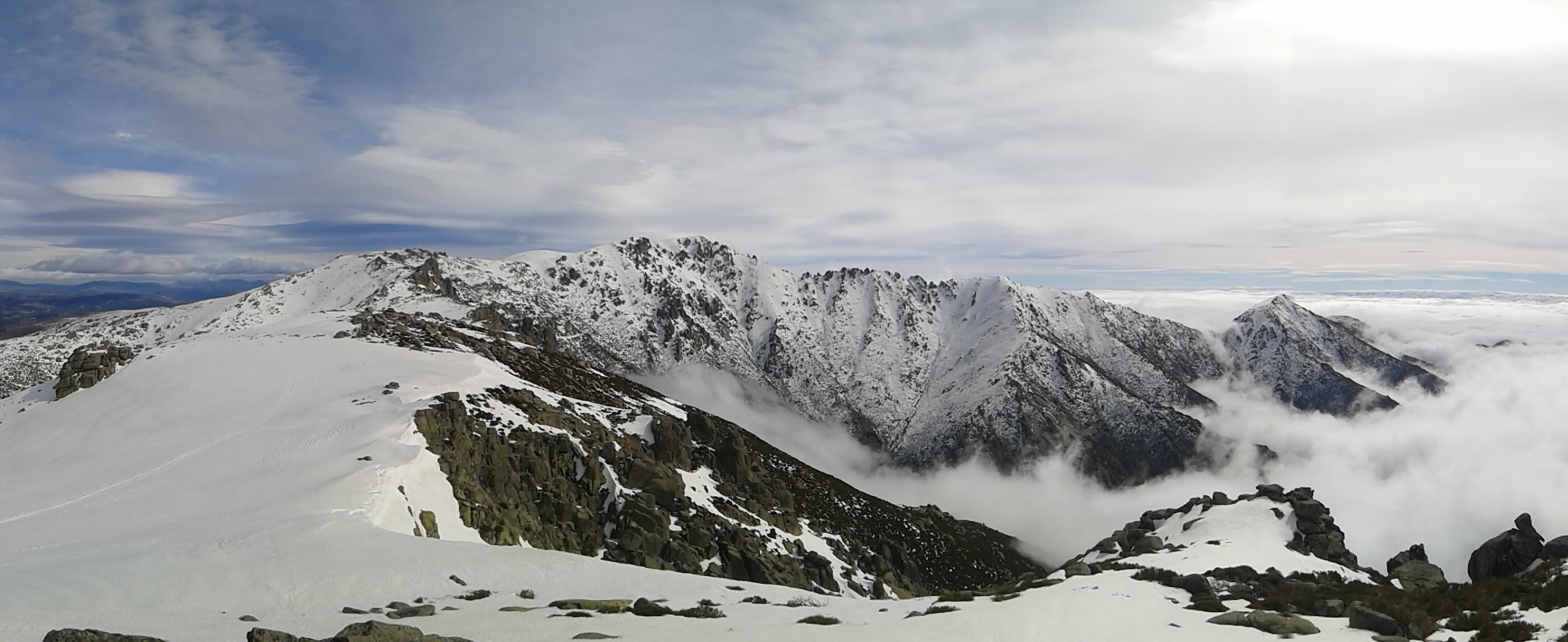
- View of La Mira from La Cuerda de los Campanarios

Highest point
- Elevation: 2,343 m (7,687 ft)
- Prominence: 348 m (1,142 ft)
- Coordinates: 40°15′39.91″N 5°10′52.26″W

Geography
- Location within Spain
- Location: Spain; Castile and León; Arenas de San Pedro, Guisando, El Hornillo, Hoyos del Espino
- Parent range: Sierra de Gredos

La Mira is a peak of the Sierra de Gredos range in central Spain. It is located in the central part of the Sierra de Gredos range, a subrange of the larger Sistema Central, in the autonomous community of Castile and León. Listed at 2,343 metres (7,687 ft), it marks the common boundary of Arenas de San Pedro, Guisando, El Hornillo and Hoyos del Espino municipalities.

Like many of the highest mountains in the range La Mira is notable for its quite important local relief relative to the south side, where the Tiétar Valley is located at 400 metres (1,300 ft). The relative prominence, 348 metres (1,142 ft), is not that great, as it is connected to Pico Almanzor (2,591 metres (8,501 ft)), the highest mountain of Sistema Central.

The top can be reached both through the north and the south side. The northern access starts at Plataforma de Gredos (1,800 metres (5,900 ft)), while the southern access starts at Nogal del Barranco (1,159 metres (3,802 ft)).

Nearby the mountain, separated by a deep gorge called Garganta de los Galayos, Los Galayos formation, a chain of narrow peaks or columns which rises to 2,200 metres (7,200 ft), is located.

== See also ==
- Geography of Spain
