= Daniel de Fernando =

Spanish pharmacist and politician (1938–2019)

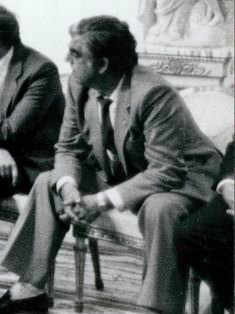

President of the Provincial Deputation of Ávila
- In office 1987–1991
- In office 27 April 1979 – 1982

Member of the Cortes of Castile and León
- In office 21 May 1983 – 20 June 1995
- Constituency: Ávila

Spokesperson of the CDS Parliamentary Group in the Cortes of Castile and León
- In office 10 March 2022 – 3 November 1987
- Preceded by: Office established
- Succeeded by: José Luis Sagredo de Miguel

Member of the Congress of Deputies
- In office 2 July 1977 – 2 January 1979
- Constituency: Ávila

Daniel de Fernando Alonso (12 February 1938 – 7 March 2019) was a Spanish pharmacist and politician. A member of the Union of the Democratic Centre (UCD) and its successor the Democratic and Social Centre, he was a Deputy in the Constituent Cortes (1977–1979), president of the Provincial Deputation of Ávila (1979–1982; 1987–1991) and a member of the Cortes of Castile and León (1983–1991).

== Biography ==
De Fernando was born either in Arenas de San Pedro or Guisando in the Province of Ávila. A qualified pharmacist, he built up a friendship with Adolfo Suárez and joined his Union of the Democratic Centre (UCD). He was elected to represent Ávila in the Constituent Cortes (1977–1979), in addition to being elected to the Provincial Deputation in 1978, becoming the latter's president for 1979–1982 and 1987–1991. Among his achievements as provincial president were the construction of motorways and telecommunication networks, running water to rural villages and the acquisition of the Torreón de Lozoya to serve as the provincial headquarters. He was rewarded with the deputation's gold medal in 2008.

In 1977 and 1979–1982, he was part of Castile and León's pre-autonomous General Council, during which time he was part of UCD rebellions against Suárez that broke down the party. In 1982, he helped Suárez set up a new party, the Democratic and Social Centre (Spain) (CDS). He was the party's president from 1987 to 1992 and led it in the Cortes of Castile and León from the first elections in 1983 until 1995. On 7 September 1982, he was awarded the Great Cross of the Order of Military Merit. During the first legislature on Cortes was member of Interior Government and Territorial Administration committee, member of Statute parliamentary committee until December 1984, on Presidency committee and Procuradores committee until December 1986, and since then member of Agriculture, Livestock and Forestry parliamentary committee. He was also substitute member of Standing Committee and on Estival 84 Inquiry Commission

In 1987, the CDS abstained in the vote for regional president, allowing José María Aznar of the People's Alliance (AP) to win, in exchange for CDS member Carlos Sánchez-Reyes the president of the Cortes. Two years later, the CDS joined the AP in coalition. De Fernando said he was not in favour of any of these events, and people higher up than him in the party made the decisions. During the second legislature was spokesperson on Standing Committee, and member of Agriculture, Livestock and Forestry parliamentary committee. Since 1989 was member of the newly established Environment and Land Planning parliamentary committee.

As the CDS collapsed in the early 1990s, De Fernando ran unsuccessfully for the Independent Group of Ávila (AIA) in the 1995 election. He then left politics and returned to pharmacy until his retirement. Upon his death in Ávila at the age of 81, the provincial deputation declared three days of mourning.
