= Nebria pazi =

Scientific classification
- Kingdom: Animalia
- Phylum: Arthropoda
- Class: Insecta
- Order: Coleoptera
- Suborder: Adephaga
- Family: Carabidae
- Genus: Nebria
- Species: N. pazi

Binomial name
- Nebria pazi (Seidlitz, 1867)

Species of beetle

Nebria pazi is a species of ground beetle in the Nebriinae subfamily that can be found in Bejar and Gredos mountains of Spain.
