= Sierra del Ocejón =

Mountain range in Spain

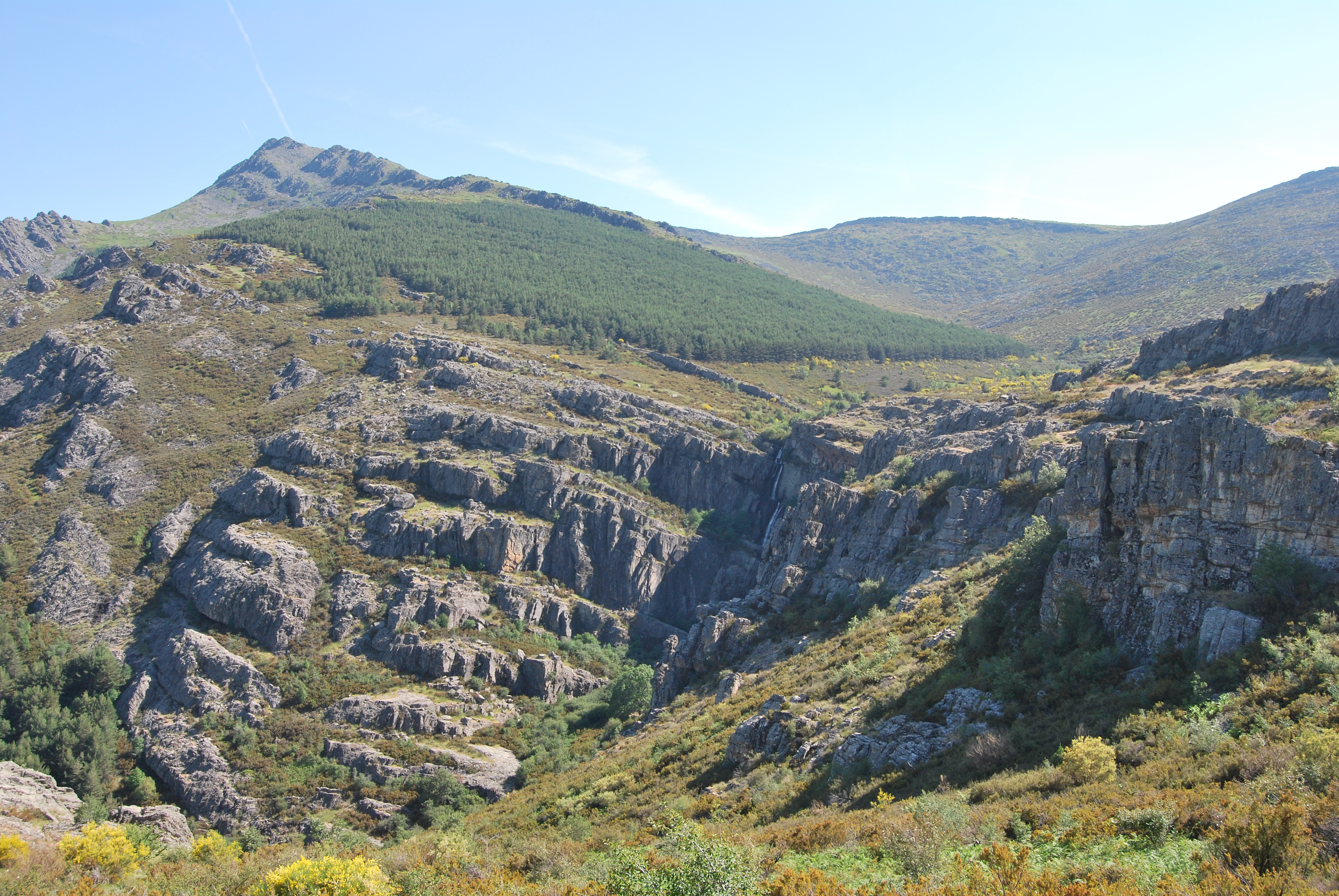
- Panorama

Highest point
- Elevation: 2,046 m (6,713 ft)
- Coordinates: 41°06′17″N 3°15′20″W

Geography
- Location: Iberian Peninsula, Spain
- Parent range: Sistema Central

The Sierra del Ocejón or Sierra del Robledal is a mountain range located in the central part of the Iberian Peninsula.

== Geography ==
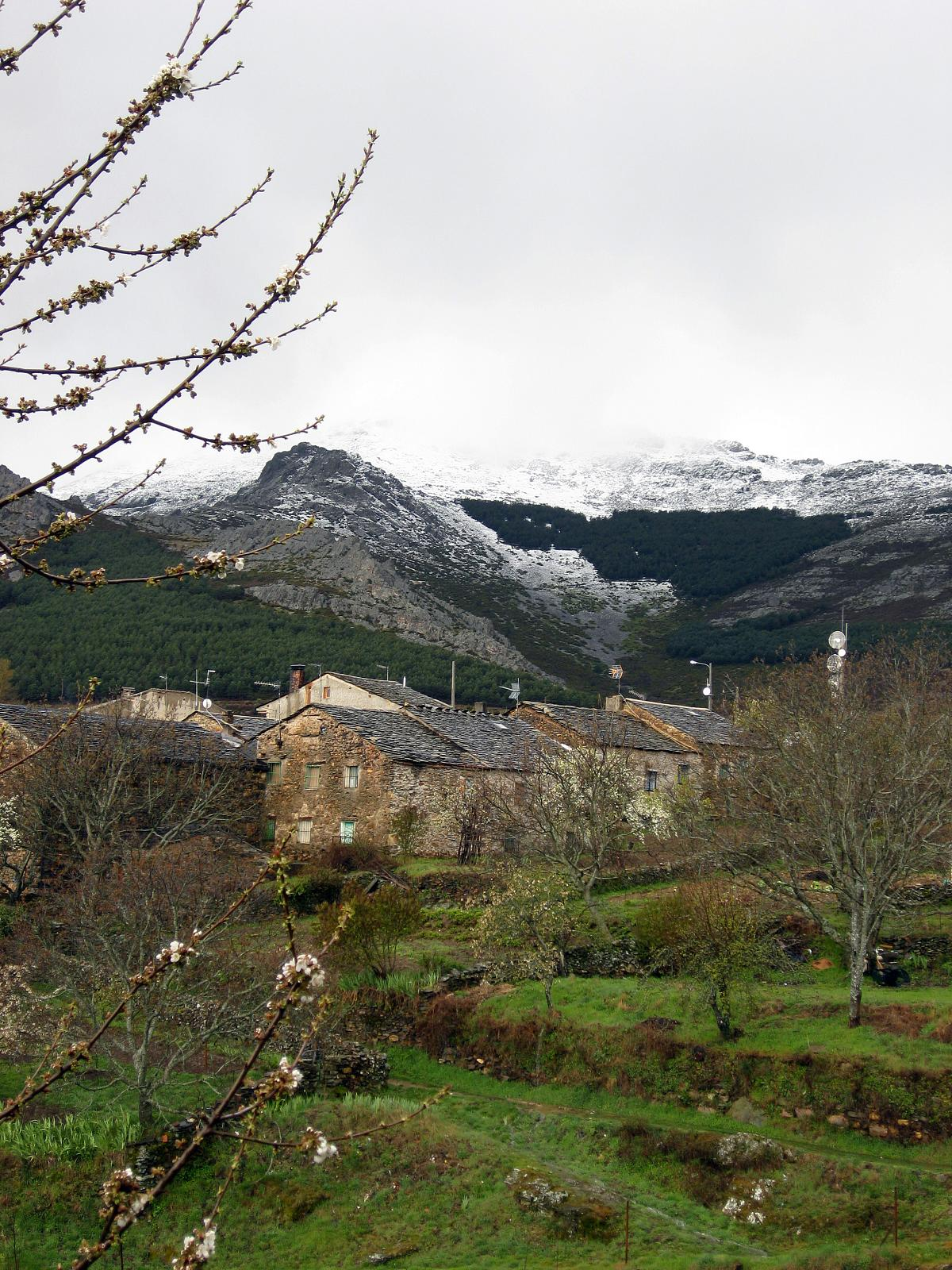
Mount Campo from Valverde de los Arroyos

The range belongs to the Sistema Central. Its northern limit is considered the Río Sonsaz while Tamajón's territory is its southern border; from West to East the mountain range stretches from the valley of the Arroyo de la Matilla to the Río Sorbe.

Its highest point is the Ocejón, at 2068 metres. The northern part of the zone is scarcely inhabited and most of the population lives in the South of the range.

=== Main peaks ===
- Pico Ocejón (2.048 msnm),
- Campo (1.919 msnm),
- Campachuelo (1.889 msnm),
- Cerrito Collado (1.738 msnm),
- Peña del Reloj (1.506 msnm),
- Cabeza de Ranas (1.492 msnm).

=== Concerned municipalities ===
- Campillo de Ranas,
- Majaelrayo,
- Tamajón,
- Valverde de los Arroyos.

== Culture and economy ==
The villages of the sierra are well known for their typical sheep breeds. Sierra del Ocejón area is also considered one of the places in Spain where the Arquitectura negra, a traditional building technique based on a wide use of slate, is very well preserved.

== Bibliography ==
- DÍAZ MARTÍNEZ, Miguel Ángel y LÓPEZ BALLESTEROS, José Alberto (2003). La sierra de Ayllón (in Spanish). Madrid: Ediciones El Senderista. ISBN 84-95368-22-6.
- PLIEGO VEGA, Domingo (1998). Los dosmiles de la sierra de Ayllón (in Spanish). Madrid: Desnivel ediciones. ISBN 84-89969-03-5.

== See also ==
- Sistema Central
