= Ocejón =

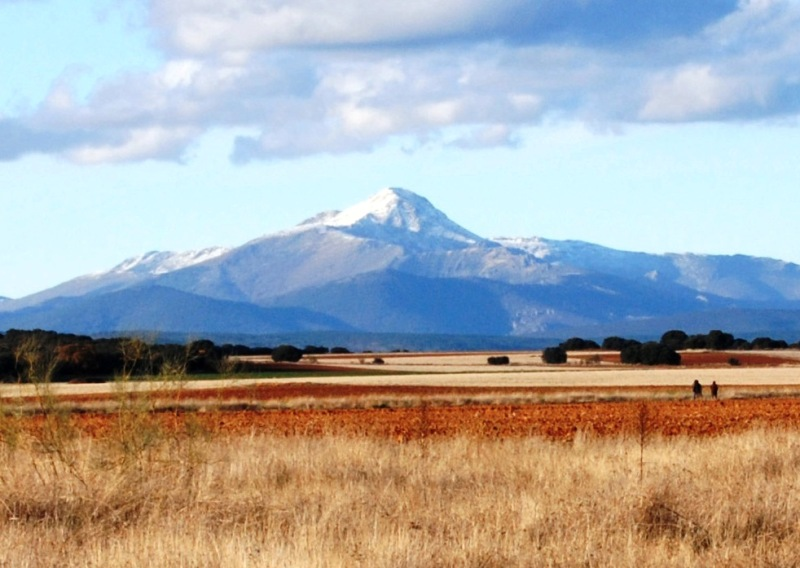
- View from the South

Highest point
- Elevation: 2,046 m (6,713 ft)
- Coordinates: 41°06′17″N 3°15′20″W

Geography
- Location within Spain
- Location: Province of Guadalajara, Spain
- Parent range: Sierra de Ocejón (Sistema Central)

Ocejón is a mountain of the Sistema Central, in the Iberian Peninsula.

== Geography ==
The mountain is located in central Spain, in the Sierra de Ocejón subrange. Listed at 2,046 metres (6,713 ft), it is one of the highest peaks in the province of Guadalajara.

== Access to the summit ==
There are two routes to the summit, starting in Majaelrayo and Valverde de los Arroyos, two of the closest villages.
