= Sierra de Béjar =

Sierra de Béjar may refer to:

- Sierra de Béjar (mountain range) a mountain range in Spain
- Sierra de Béjar (comarca) a comarca in the province of Salamanca
