= Canchal de la Ceja =

Mountain in Spain

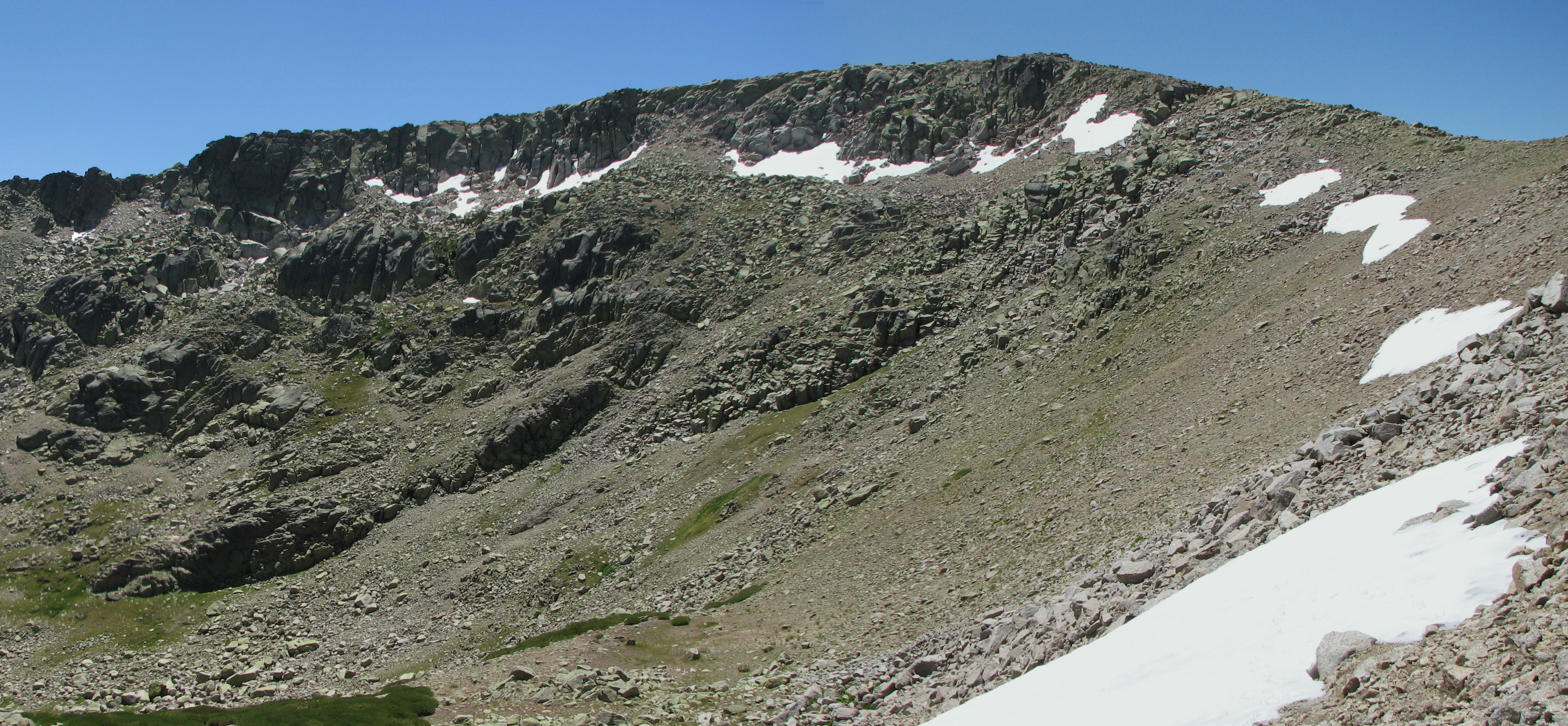
- North face of the mountain

Highest point
- Elevation: 2,427 m (7,963 ft)
- Prominence: 1,153 m (3,783 ft)
- Listing: Ribu
- Coordinates: 40°18′16″N 05°43′44″W

Naming
- English translation: Eyebrow scree
- Language of name: Spanish

Geography
- Location within Spain
- Location: Ávila (Castile and León); Salamanca (Castile and León)
- Parent range: Sierra de Béjar (Sistema Central)

Climbing
- Easiest route: hike

The Canchal de la Ceja is a 2,427 metres high mountain in Spain.

== Etymology ==
Canchal means scree; the name Ceja (literally eyebrow) comes from the peculiar shape of the snowfield located below the summit on the North face of the mountain .

== Geography ==
The mountain is located on the border between the provinces of Ávila and Salamanca, both belonging to Castile and León autonomous community. It's the highest peak of the mountain range called Sierra de Béjar and of Province of Salamanca.

The lakes located around the mountain are the largest in the Sierra de Gredos area.

== Access to the summit ==
The shortest route to the summit starts from Plataforma del Travieso (1850 m, around 10 km from Candelario) and takes a couple of hours hiking. The North face of the mountain offers some climbing routes.

== See also ==
- Sistema Central

== Bibliography ==
- R.M. Carrasco, J. De Pedraza (1995). "Morfología glaciar de las cimas en la Sierra de Gredos: monteras de hielo. En T. Aleixandre y A. Pérez-González (eds.), Reconstrucción de paleoambientes y cambios climáticos durante el Cuaternario" (PDF). Monografias del Centro de Ciencias Medioambientales (in Spanish) (3). Centro de Ciencias Medioambientales (CSIC): 226–238. Archived from the original (PDF) on 2011-11-09.
