= 87.7 FM =

FM radio frequency

The following radio stations broadcast on FM frequency 87.7 MHz:

Note, 87.7 MHz overlaps NTSC channel 6 audio.

== Argentina ==
- Alta voz in La Plata, Buenos Aires
- Conexión in Córdoba
- Libertad in Rosario, Santa Fe
- La Mira in Santa Fe de la Vera Cruz, Santa Fe
- Océano in La Matanza, Buenos Aires
- Publica Lujan in Lujan, Buenos Aires
- Radio Graffiti in Mar del Plata, Buenos Aires
- LRBO in Buenos Aires
- La Voz de la Esperanza in Rosario, Santa Fe
- Voces in La Rioja

== Brazil ==
In Brazil, the frequency 87.7 FM is one of the frequencies reserved for community radio stations. These stations have power limited to up to 25 watts and coverage limited to a radius of up to 1 km.

It also uses Pan American analog TV sound VHF channel 6 in PAL-M (83.25 - 87.75 MHz).

== China ==
- CNR China Traffic Radio in Chengdu

== Germany ==
- Radio Hashtag +

== Greece ==
- En Lefko

== Japan ==
- Banana FM, Wakayama, Japan

== Malaysia ==
- Radio Klasik in Kuala Lumpur

== Netherlands ==
- Radio 10, North-west and midregion

== New Zealand ==
- Various low-power stations up to 1 watt

== North America ==
- 87.75 MHz, a frequency-modulated (FM) audio subcarrier used by all NTSC-M analog channel 6 television stations (discontinued July 13, 2021, in the United States)
- For a list of channel 6 television stations transmitting using a modification of the ATSC 3.0 digital TV standard to carry an analog FM audio feed on 87.75 MHz, usually advertised as 87.7 FM, see Channel 6 radio stations in the United States.

== Poland ==
- Radio Akadera, Białystok
- Radio Radom, Radom
- Radio Maryja, Świnoujście
- Polskie Radio Program II (Dwójka), Wrocław

== Philippines ==
- Brigada News FM in Goa, Camarines Sur
- Juander Radyo in Kidapawan

== Spain ==
=== Canary Islands ===
- TKO Gold, Costa Blanca

== Turkey ==
- TRT FM in Gaziantep- Hacıbaba

== United Kingdom ==
87.7 MHz is commonly used for stations operating under a restricted service licence, such as:

- Radio Wimbledon - Broadcast during The Championships, Wimbledon
- Donington Park Race Circuit broadcast commentary for all events throughout the season, knows as “Radio Donington”
- JALSA FM - Broadcast during the 3-day Jalsa Salana in Alton, Hampshire.
- New Wine FM - Broadcast during the New Wine National Gathering in Somerset for the duration of the conference
- Brighton Festival Radio, Brighton, England
- Eastbourne Youth Radio, Eastbourne, England
- NME Radio in Manchester, England
- Radio Ramadhan, Glasgow, Scotland
- Storm FM, University of Wales (Prifysgol Bangor University), Bangor, Gwynedd, Wales
- Worthy FM, A radio station broadcast during the Glastonbury Festival
- Wychwood FM A radio station broadcast during Wychwood Festival in Cheltenham
- Withybush FM, Withybush Hospital, Haverfordwest, Pembrokeshire, Wales
- Honiton Community College Radio FM, Honiton Community College, Honiton, Devon, South West England
- Infinity Radio (Stamford) Lincs
- Radio Christmas (Amersham) Buckinghamshire
- Knockhill Racing Circuit use this frequency to broadcast 'Knockhill FM' on race days
- Goodwood Festival of Speed broadcasts radio programming during the Festival of Speed and Goodwood Revival
- Brands Hatch uses this frequency during events to broadcast 'Radio Brands'
- FCOT FM, Farnborough, Hampshire broadcasts locally during their one-month live transmission from the local Farnborough College of Technology
- Oulton Park uses this frequency during race events to broadcast BSB Radio
- Silverstone Circuit uses this frequency to broadcast Silverstone FM radio station.
- Xpression FM broadcasts on this frequency from the University of Exeter
- Thruxton Race Circuit BTCC
- pure west radio Haverfordwest
- Air Tattoo Live - Broadcasts during the Royal International Air Tattoo airshow.
