= Laguna del Barco =

Lake in Province of Ávila, Spain

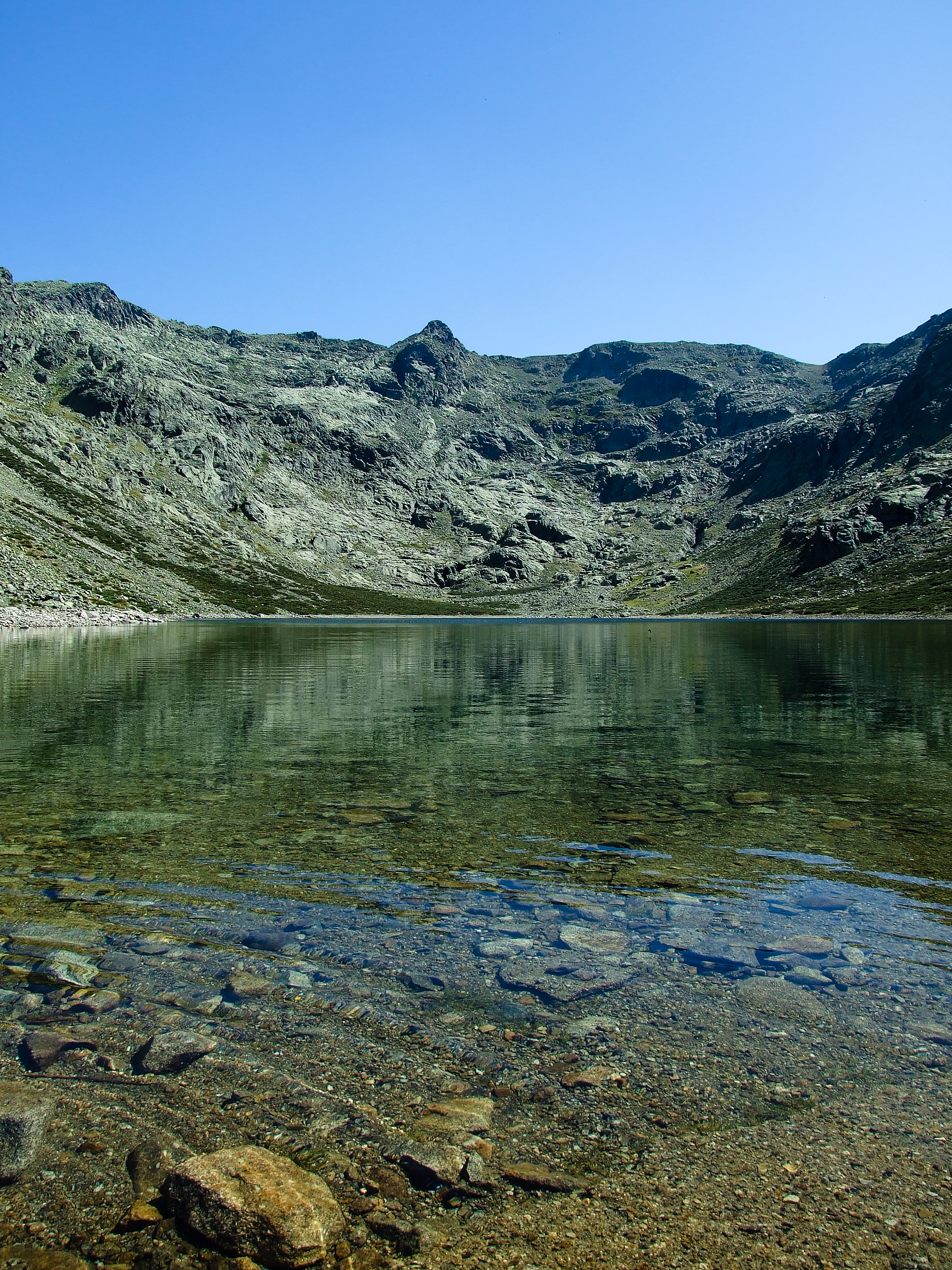
- Laguna del Barco on 30 July 2009

- Location within Spain
- Interactive map of Laguna del Barco
- Coordinates: 40.231184°N 5.60346°W
- Type: Glacial lake
- Basin countries: Spain

Laguna del Barco is a glacial lake in the Sierra de Gredos near the town of El Barco de Ávila, in the province of Ávila, Spain.

The lake is at an altitude of 1,790 metres (5,870 ft). It lies in a long glacial valley on the north side of Covacha, one of three such valleys. Covacha, with a height of 2,399 metres (7,871 ft) is the highest point on the main ridge of the western Sierra de Gredos. (Note: Pico Almanzor, to the east, is the highest peak in the Sierra de Gredos at 2,592 metres (8,504 ft).) The exit from the natural lake has been dammed to increase its storage capacity.

The lake can be reached on foot from the hamlet of La Erilla in a round trip hike of 24 kilometres (15 mi), that should take about five hours. Shepherds huts along the route provide shelter. The lake is used as a reservoir, and no camping is allowed in the valley. The route, which is not difficult, passes through country of great natural beauty.
