= El Hornillo =

- Municipality
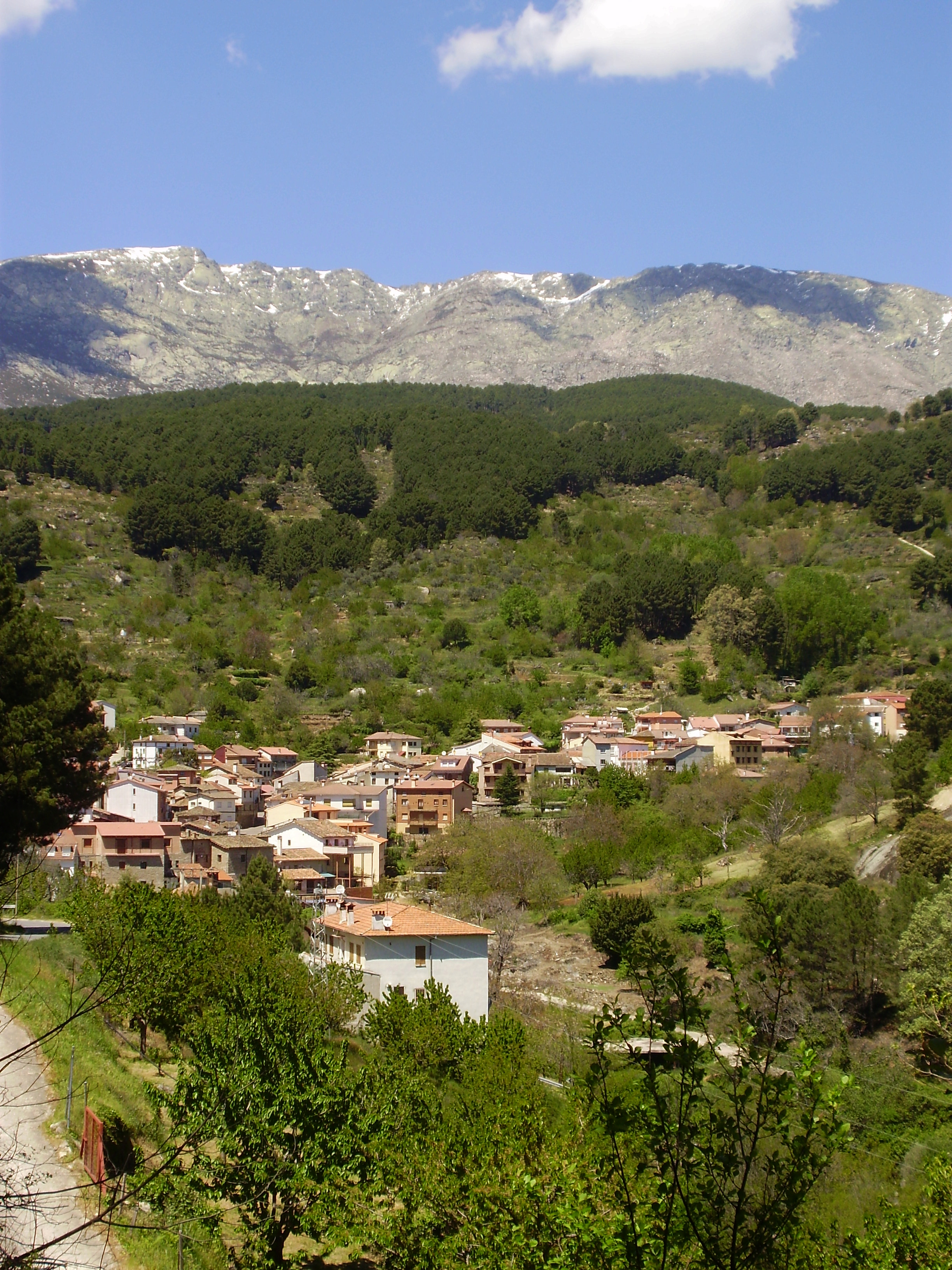

- Flag Coat of arms

- Location in Spain. El Hornillo (Spain)
- Coordinates: 40°14′59″N 5°06′15″W
- Country: Spain
- Autonomous community: Castile and León
- Province: Ávila
- Municipality: El Hornillo

Area
  - Total: 23.27 km^{2} (8.98 sq mi)
- Elevation: 748 m (2,454 ft)

Population (2025-01-01)
  - Total: 263
  - Density: 11.3/km^{2} (29.3/sq mi)
- Time zone: UTC+1 (CET)
  - Summer (DST): UTC+2 (CEST)
- Website: Official website

El Hornillo is a municipality located in the province of Ávila, Castile and León, Spain.

== Population ==
Historical population
Year	Pop.	±% p.a.
2023	266	—
2024	280	+5.26%
2025	263	−6.07%
Source: INE
