= Gavilanes =

- Municipality
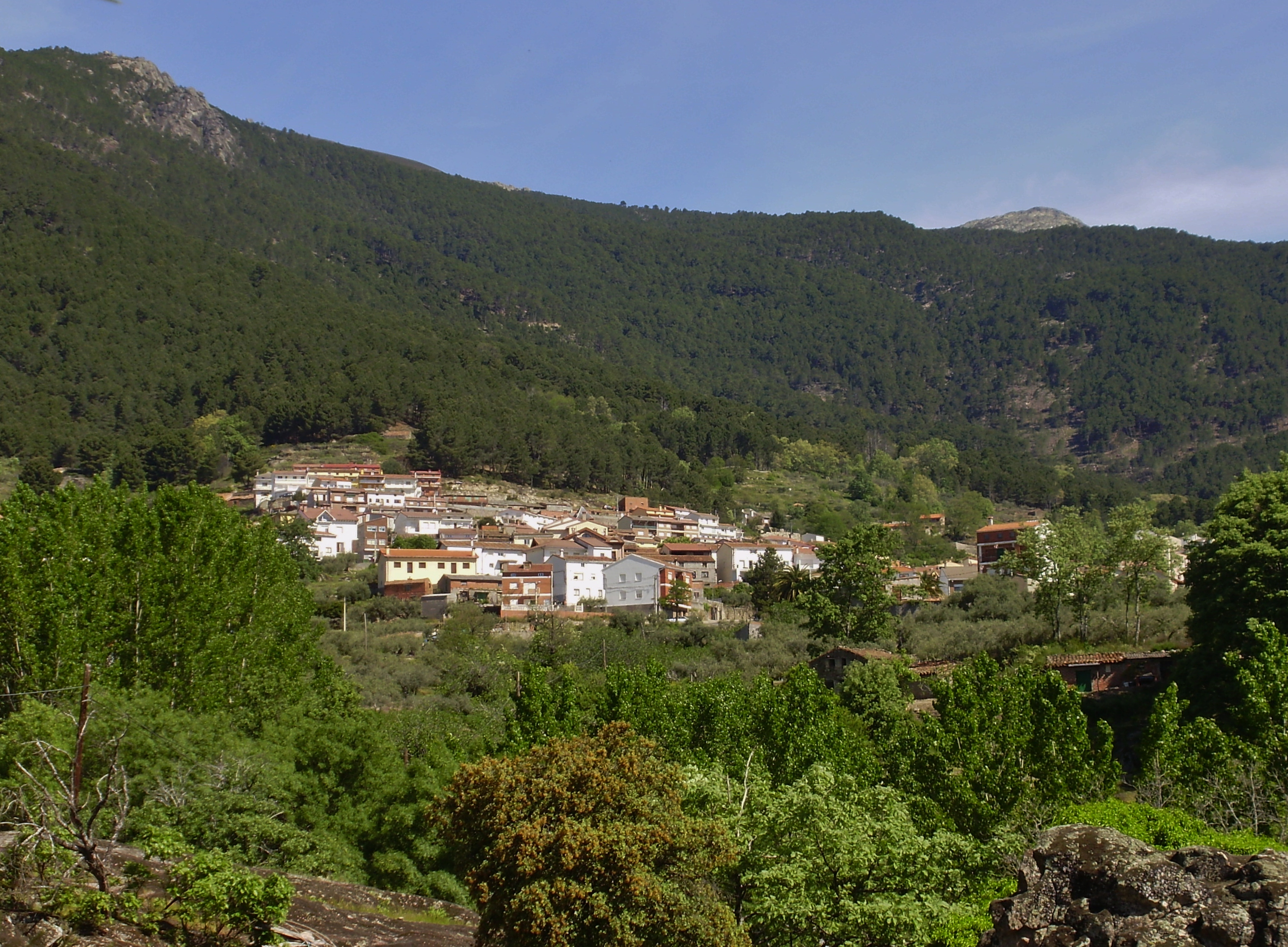
- View of Gavilanes

- Flag Coat of arms

- Location in Spain. Gavilanes (Spain)
- Coordinates: 40°16′39″N 4°51′04″W
- Country: Spain
- Autonomous community: Castile and León
- Province: Ávila
- Municipality: Gavilanes

Area
  - Total: 29 km^{2} (11 sq mi)

Population (2025-01-01)
  - Total: 523
  - Density: 18/km^{2} (47/sq mi)
- Time zone: UTC+1 (CET)
  - Summer (DST): UTC+2 (CEST)
- Website: Official website

Gavilanes is a municipality located in the province of Ávila, Castile and León, Spain.

== Population ==
Historical population
Year	Pop.	±% p.a.
2023	547	—
2024	529	−3.29%
2025	523	−1.13%
Source: INE
