= Sistema Central =

Mountain range in the Iberian Peninsula

Central System
- Sistema Central
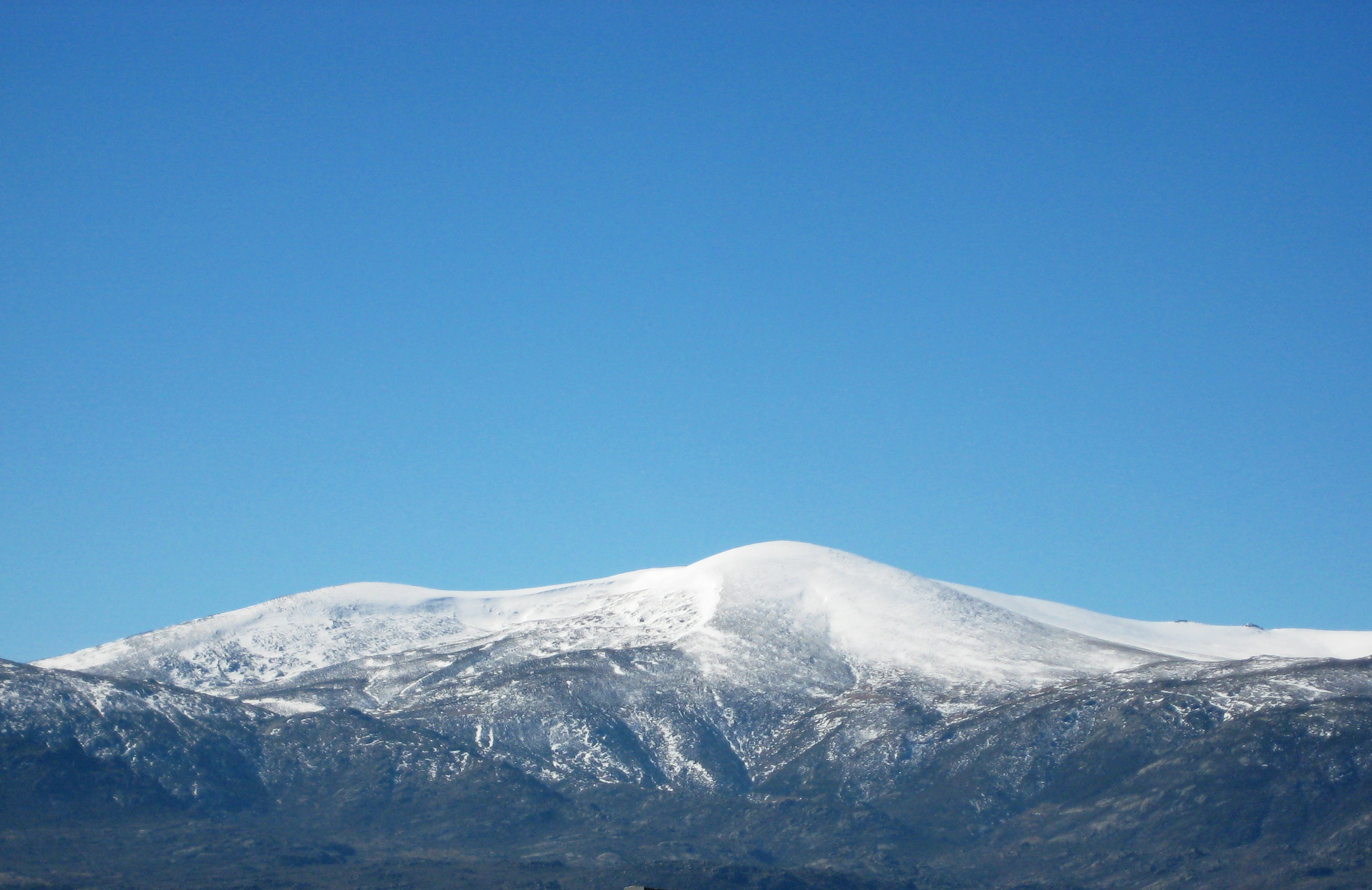
- View of La Serrota, 2.294 m, in Ávila Province

Highest point
- Peak: Pico Almanzor
- Elevation: 2,592 m (8,504 ft)
- Coordinates: 40°14′48″N 05°17′52″W

Dimensions
- Length: 600 km (370 mi) ENE - WSW
- Width: 30 km (19 mi) NNW - SSE

Geography
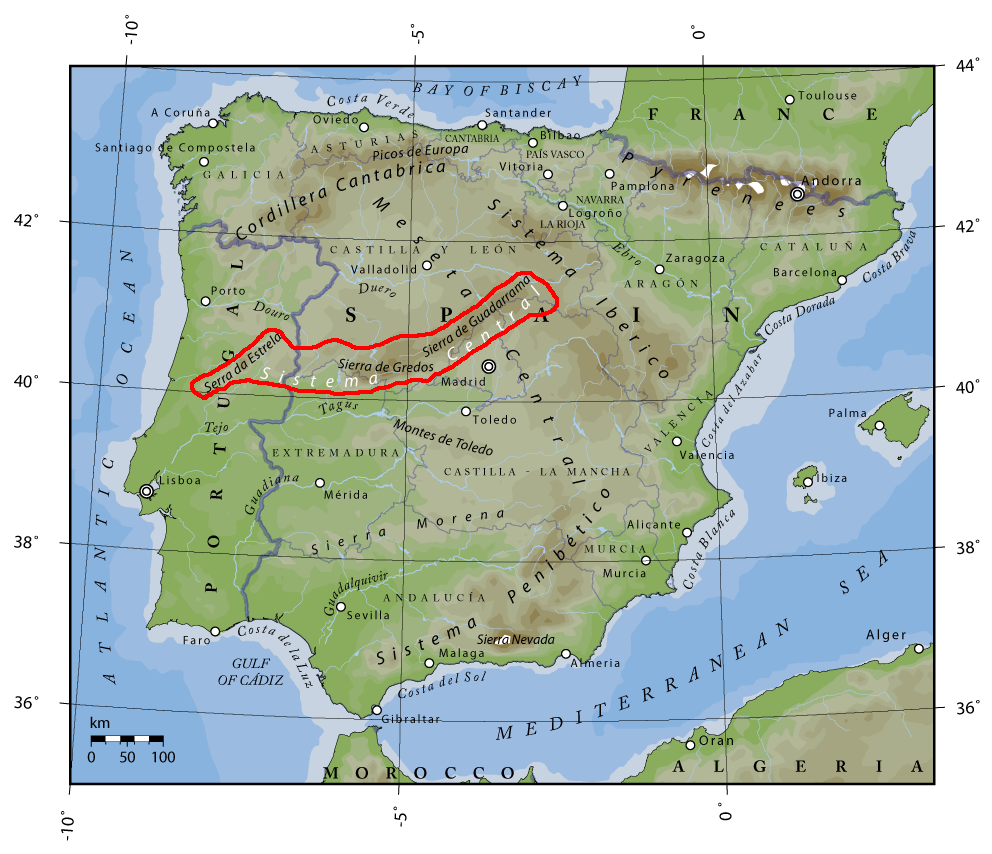
- Location of the Sistema Central in the Iberian Peninsula
- Countries: Spain and Portugal
- Communities: Extremadura, Castile-La Mancha and Castile and León
- Districts: Guarda and Castelo Branco

Geology
- Orogeny: Alpine
- Rock age: Tertiary
- Rock types: Limestone and sandstone

The Central System, Spanish and Portuguese: Sistema Central, is one of the main systems of mountain ranges in the Iberian Peninsula. The 2,592-metre-high Pico Almanzor is its highest summit.

The Central System is located just north of the 40th parallel and its ranges divide the drainage basin of the Tagus from the basin of the Douro.

== Description ==
The Sistema Central is a primary feature of the Meseta Central, the inner Iberian plateau, splitting the meseta into two parts. The Sistema Central runs in an ENE - WSW direction roughly along the southern border of the Spanish autonomous community of Castile and León and Extremadura continuing into the Guarda and Castelo Branco districts in Portugal.

Unlike the neighboring Sistema Ibérico, the Sistema Central range is a quite homogeneous system. It consists of several ranges that formed 25 million years ago as part of the Alpine orogeny.

The major mountain ranges are the Sierra de Guadarrama, which runs approximately along the border of the Madrid and Castile and León autonomous communities, the Sierra de Gredos north of the border between Castile and León and Castile-La Mancha stretching into Extremadura and containing the range's highest mountain, Pico Almanzor, at 2,592 m, as well as the Serra da Estrela, containing the highest point in continental Portugal, A Torre, 1,993 m. Other notably large ranges are Sierra de Gata and Sierra de Ayllón. The Central System links with the Sistema Ibérico at its eastern end through the Sierra de Pela, the Altos de Barahona and Sierra Ministra, the latter already fully part of the Iberian System.

"Sistema Central" is a widely known academic geographical term. Local inhabitants, however, generally refer to the Sistema Central by the names of its smaller constituent ranges.

== Mountain ranges ==
The main ranges of the Sistema Central from west to east followed by their highest points are:

- Serra da Lousã, Trevim, 1,205 m.
- Serra do Moradal
- Serra da Estrela, Torre, 1,993 m.
- Sierra de Gata, Jálama, 1,492 m.
- Sierra de la Canchera, Pico Tiendas, 1,590 m
- Sierra de Francia, Pico de la Hastiala, 1,735 m.
- Sierra de Béjar, Canchal de la Ceja, 2,430 m.
- Sierra de Gredos, Pico Almanzor, 2,592 m.
- Sierra de la Horcajada, Risco de la Umbrela, 1,562 m.
- Sierra de Villafranca, Cerro Moros, 2,059 m.
- Sierra de Piedra Aguda, Piedra Aguda, 1,817 m.
- La Serrota, Cerro del Santo, 2,294 m.
- Sierra de Hoyocasero, Navasolana, 1,708 m.
- Sierra de la Paramera, Pico Zapatero, 2,160 m.
- Sierra de Ávila, Cerro de Gorría, 1,708 m.
- Sierra de Ojos Albos, Cruz de Hierro, 1,657 m.
- Sierra de Malagón, Cueva Valiente, 1,903 m.
- Sierra de San Vicente, Cruces, 1,373 m.
- Sierra de Guadarrama, Peñalara, 2,428 m.
  - La Mujer Muerta, La Pinareja, 2,197 m.
  - Siete Picos, Siete Picos, 2,138 m.
  - La Maliciosa, Maliciosa, 2,227 m.
  - Cuerda Larga, Cabeza de Hierro Mayor, 2,383 m.
  - Sierra de la Morcuera, La Najarra, 2,122 m.
  - Sierra de Canencia, Mondalindo, 1,831 m.
  - Sierra de la Cabrera, Cancho Largo, 1,564 m.
- Sierra de Somosierra, Colgadizos, 1,834 m.
- Sierra de Ayllón, Pico del Lobo, 2,274 m.
  - Sierra de la Puebla, La Tornera, 1,866 m.
  - Sierra del Ocejón, Ocejón, 2,049 m.
- Sierra de Alto Rey, Alto Rey, 1,858 m.
- Sierra de Pela, Sima de Somolinos, 1,548 m.

=== Main ranges and features ===
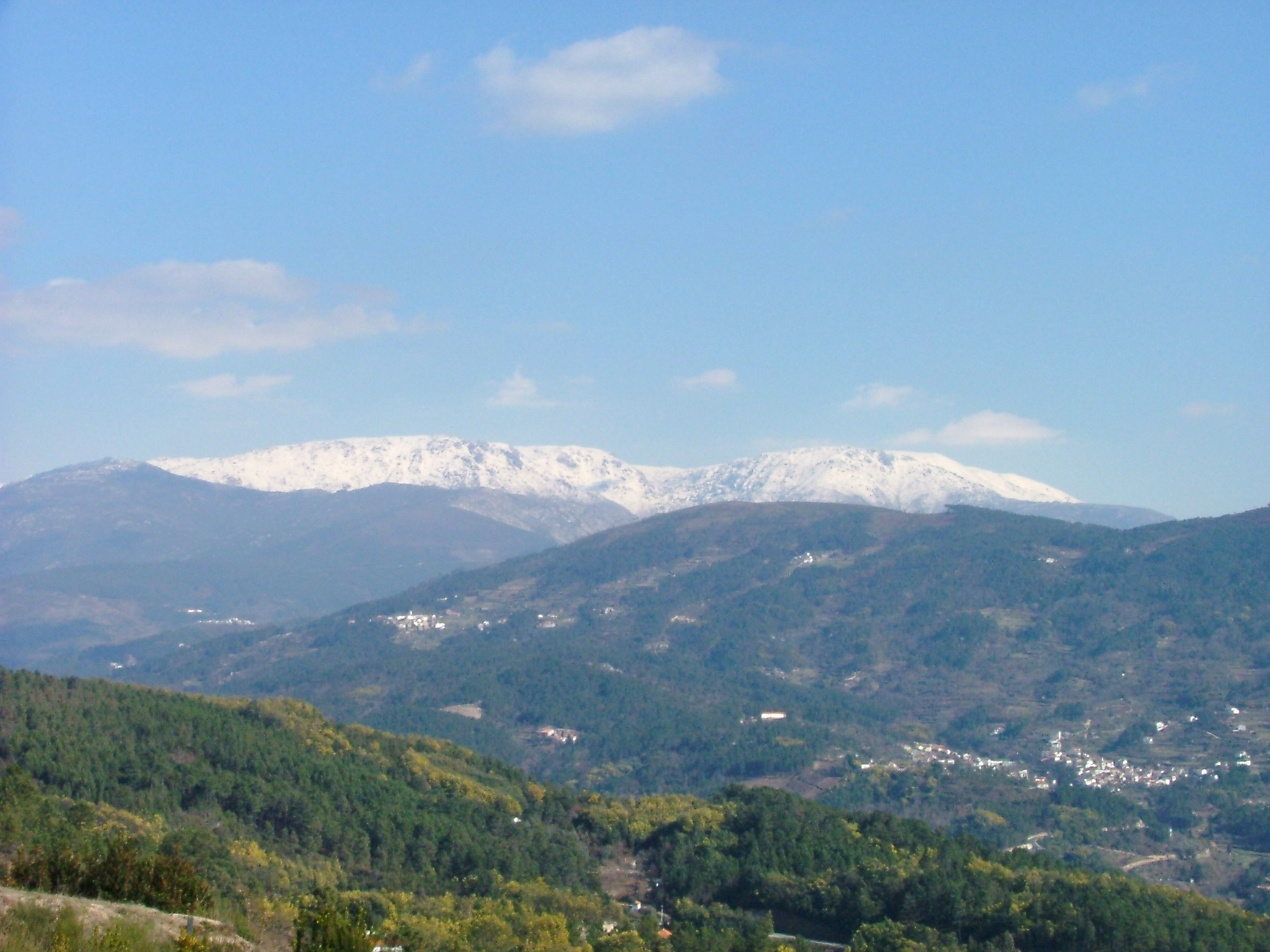
View of the Serra da Estrela, containing the highest point in continental Portugal

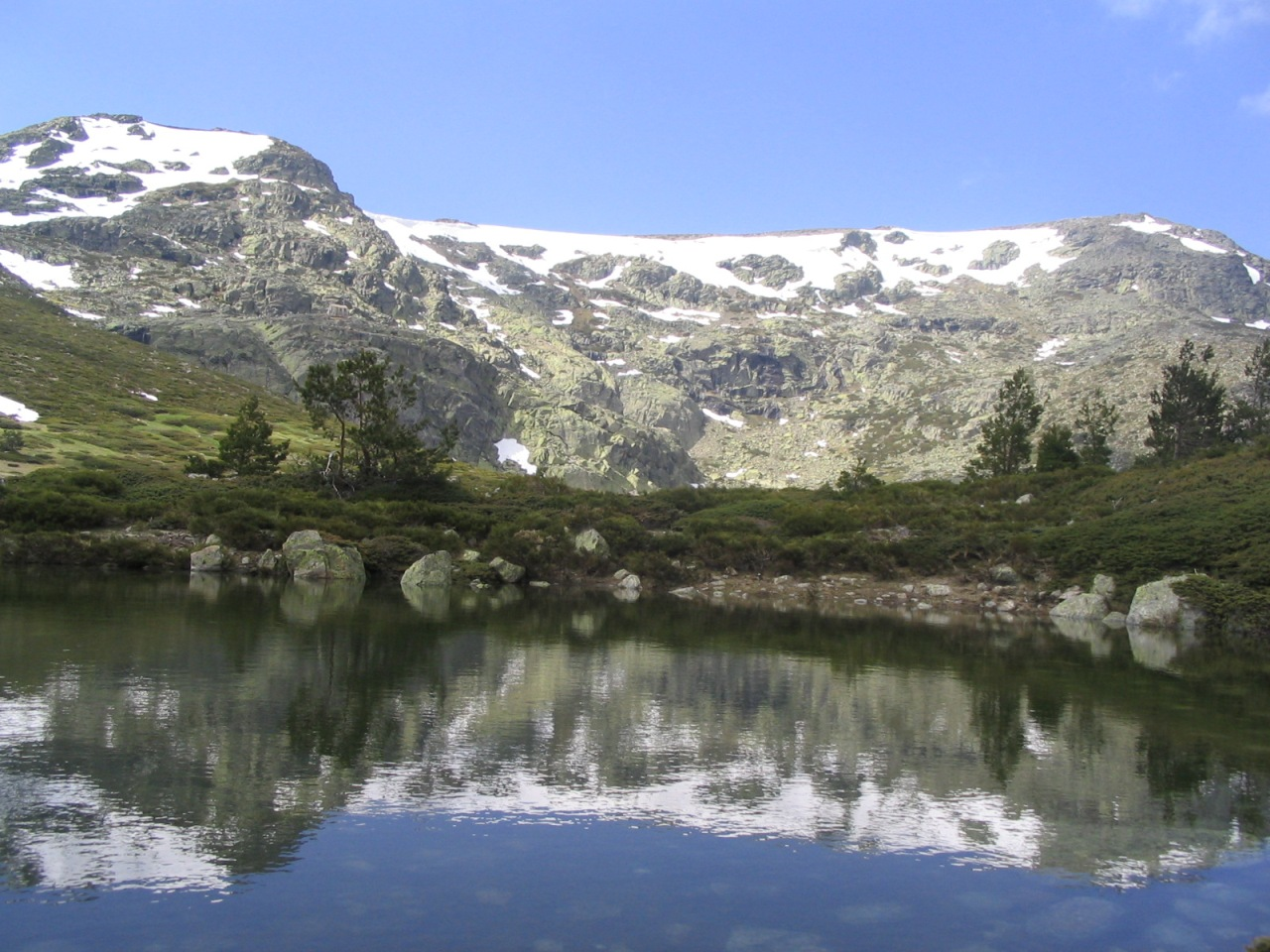
Alpine lake at Peñalara, Sierra de Guadarrama

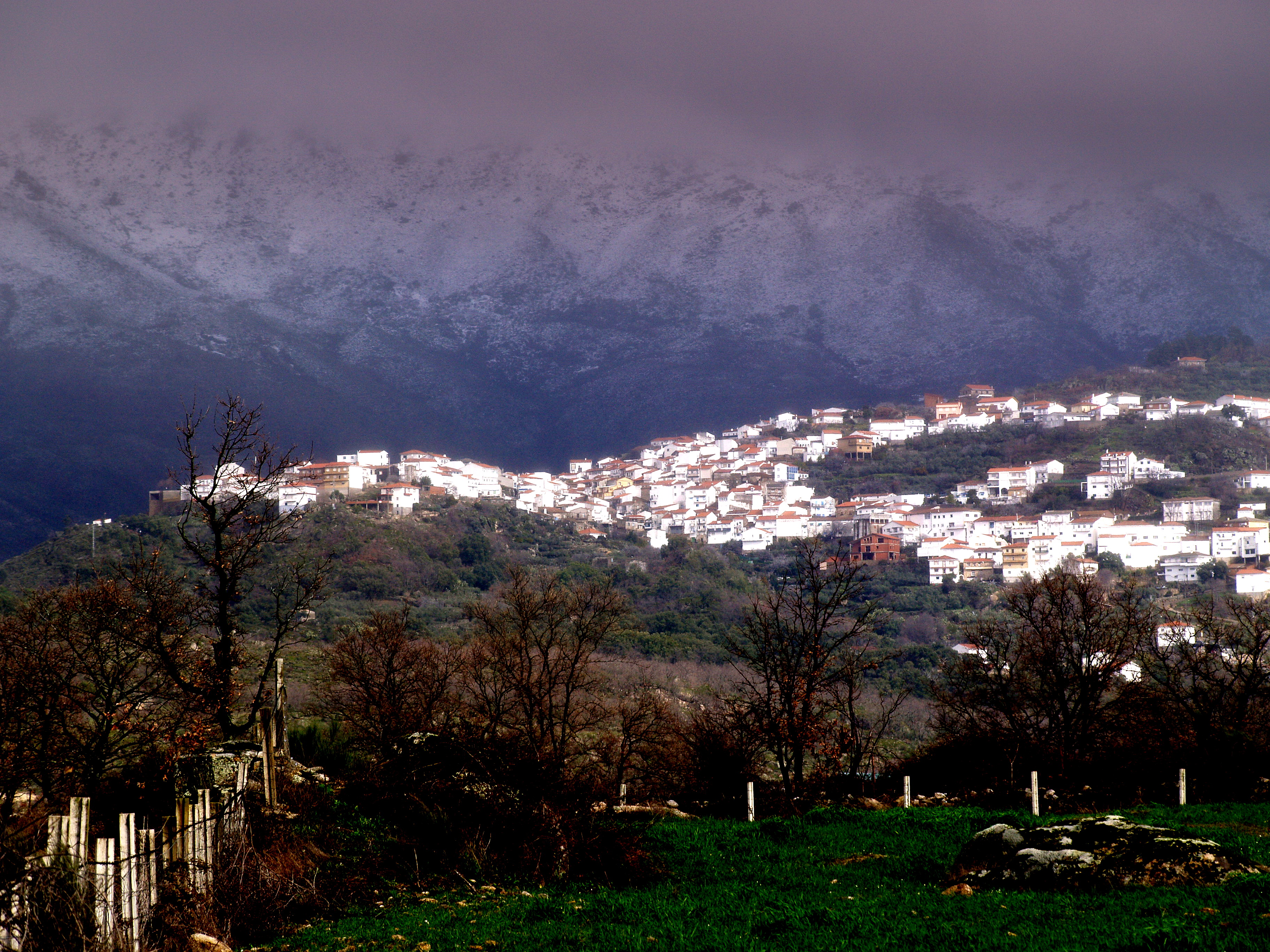
A view of the Sierra de Gata peaks in the background over a mountain village

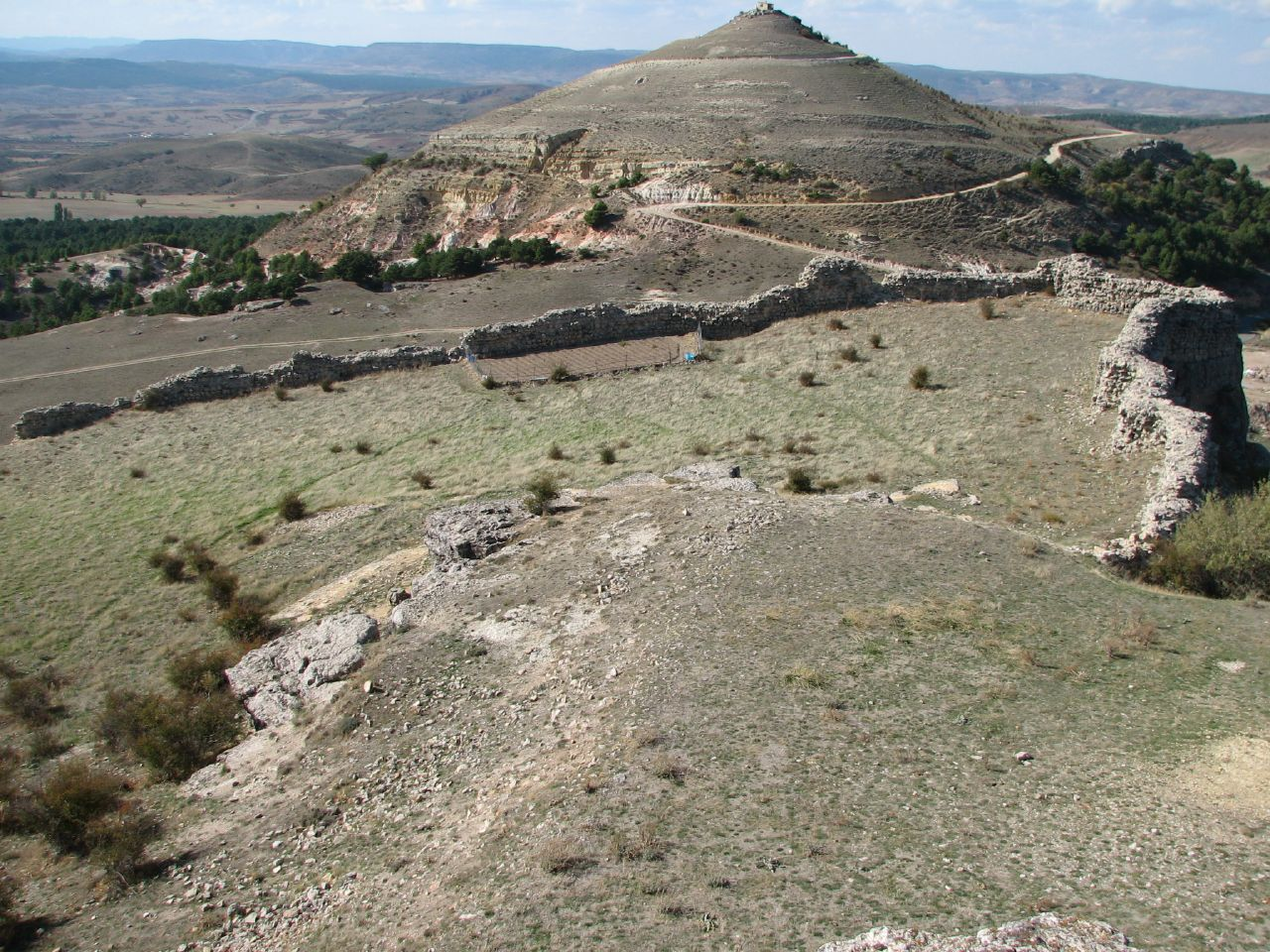
Cerro del Padrastro hill close to Atienza, in the transition zone between the Sistema Central and the Sistema Ibérico

== See also ==
- Geography of Spain, in section "The Inner Plateau and associated mountains"
- Sierra de Guadarrama
- Valsain Valley
- Valsain Mountains
- Las Hurdes
- List of mountain ranges in the world named The Sleeping Lady
- Topographical relief of Spain
