= Sierra de Béjar (mountain range) =

Mountain in Spain

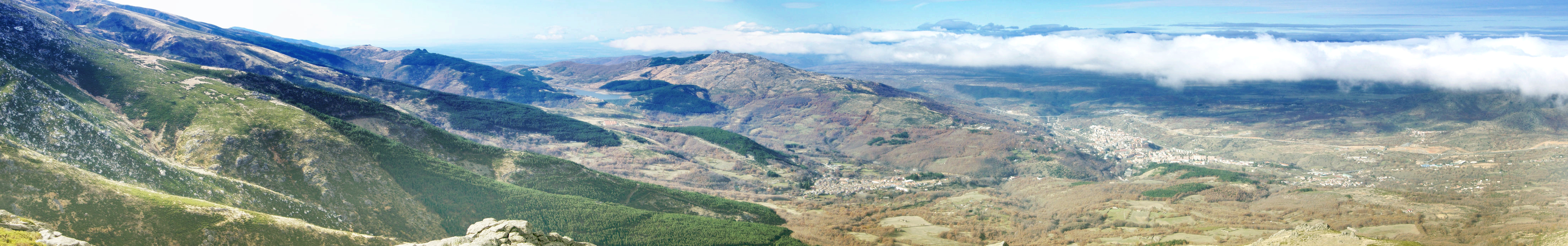
- Panorama

Highest point
- Elevation: 2,428 m (7,966 ft)
- Coordinates: 48°18′22″N 5°43′17″W

Geography
- Location: Iberian Peninsula, Spain
- Parent range: Sistema Central

Geology
- Rock type(s): Granite, Granodiorite and Migmatite

The Sierra de Béjar is a mountain range near the center of the Iberian Peninsula.

== Geography ==
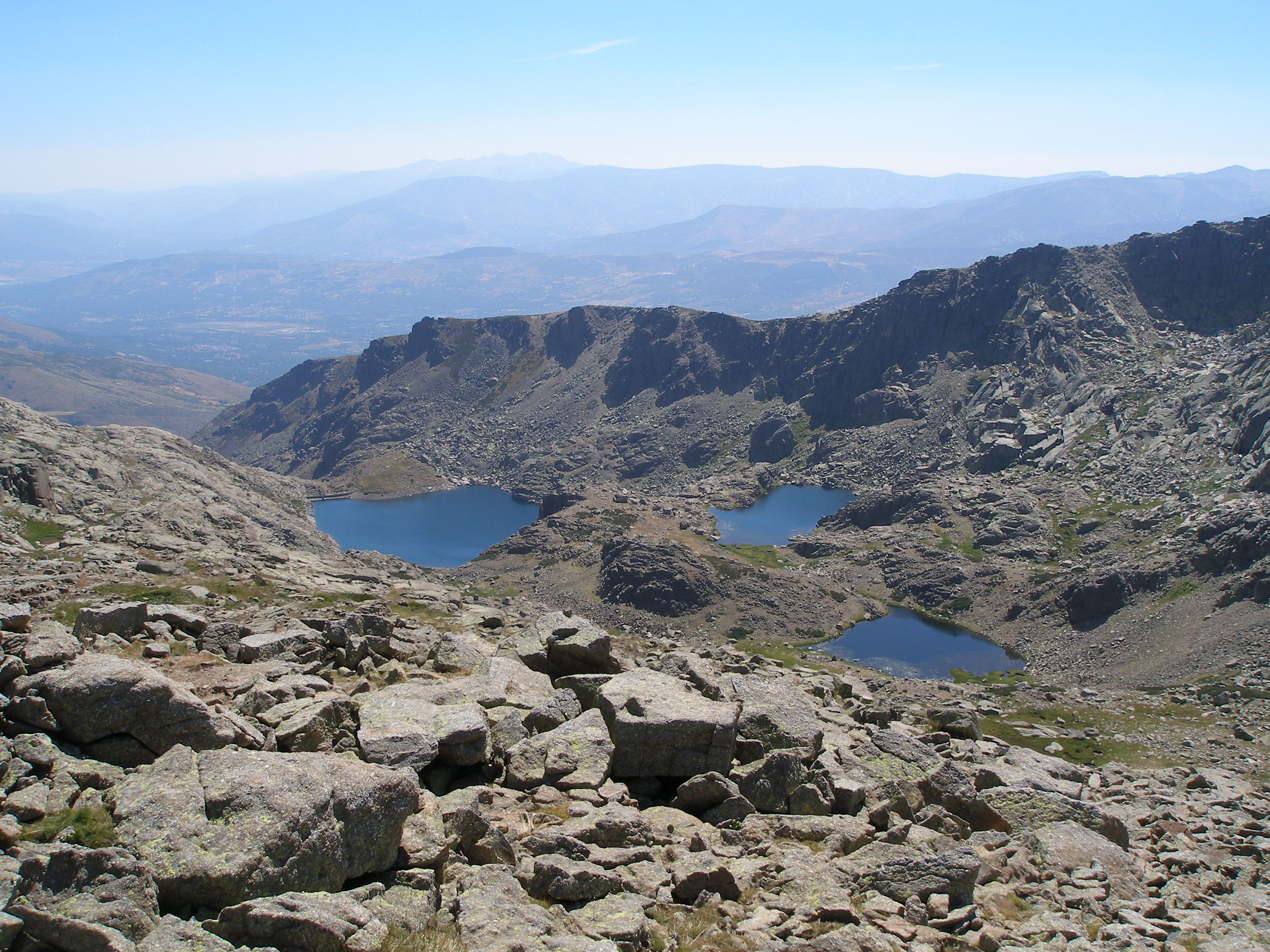
Trampal lakes

The highest point of the range is Canchal de la Ceja, at 2428 metres.

Some geographers consider Sierra de Béjar as the westernmost part of sierra de Gredos.

== See also ==
- Sistema Central
- Béjar

== Bibliography ==
- Rosa; Pedraza; Sanz; Domínguez-Villar; Willenbring (2010). El glaciar de Cuerpo de Hombre (Sierra de Béjar, Sistema Central Español) durante la deglaciación: génesis primaria del till supraglaciar de Los Hermanitos. Universidad de Huelva.
- Rosa; Villa; de la Pedraza; Domínguez-Villar; Willenbring (2011). Reconstrucción y cronología del glaciar de meseta de la Sierra de Béjar (Sistema Central Español) durante el máximo glaciar (PDF). Boletín de la Real Sociedad Española de Historia Natural. Sección geológica n.105. pp. 125–135. ISSN 0583-7510.
- Juan José Sanz Donaire (1986). El corredor de Béjar. Vol. 2. Consejo Superior de Investigaciones Científicas. ISBN 9788400062118.
