= Sierra de Gredos =

Mountain range

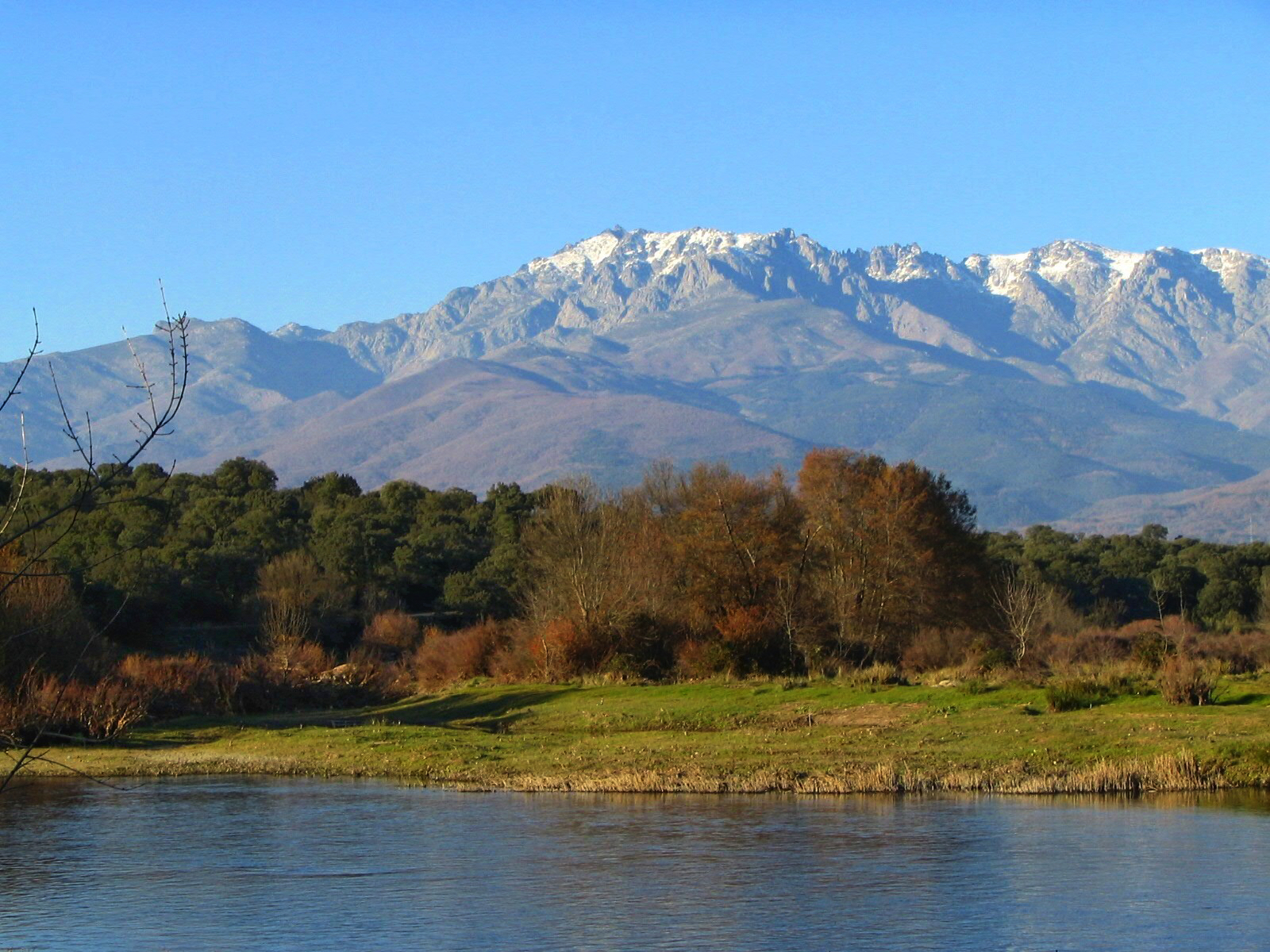
- Pico Almanzor rising over river Tiétar

Highest point
- Elevation: 2,592 m (8,504 ft)
- Coordinates: 40.25°N 5.22°W

Geography
- Location: Iberian Peninsula, Spain
- Parent range: Sistema Central

Geology
- Rock type: Granite

The Sierra de Gredos is a mountain range in central Spain that spans the provinces of Ávila, Salamanca, Cáceres, Madrid, and Toledo. It is part of the much larger Sistema Central of mountain ranges. Its highest point is Pico Almanzor at 2,592 meters and it has been declared a natural park by the Autonomous Community of Castile and León. The Sierra de Gredos is one of the most extensive mountain ranges of the Central System; it comprises five river valleys: the Alto Tormes, the Alto Alberche, the Tiétar Oriental, the Tiétar Occidental y la Vera, and the Valle del Ambroz. The first known inhabitants were the Vettones, a pre-Roman Celtic people. The central part of the range encomprises the Sierra de Gredos Regional Park.

== Geology ==
The Sierra de Gredos comprises mainly granite, which is a common type of intrusive, felsic, igneous rock which is granular and phaneritic in texture. This rock consists mainly of quartz, mica, and feldspar. In some Gredos rocks the feldspar crystals are especially large, attaining a size of several centimeters in some cases. There is also some granodiorite and outcrops of metamorphic rocks.

During a large part of the Paleozoic Era, from 600 to 350 million years ago, the whole area was covered by the Tethys Ocean where horizontal layers or strata of sediments accumulated due to the process of erosion in the unflooded regions. These sediments were fractured and folded due to the actions of the Variscan Orogeny and extensive areas emerged from the sea. At the end of the Paleozoic molten magma rose up which turned into granite as it cooled. Erosion continued for a long time until between 40 and 2 million years ago, when another convulsion, known as the Alpine Orogeny, created the mountains that today comprise the Central System. The tectonic style of the Sierra de Gredos is the so-called Germanic style, i.e. with large upraised fault blocks, known as horst, bounded by graben.

The Sierra de Gredos is divided into three sectors: the Eastern sector up to the Puerto del Pico fault, the Central sector up to the Puerto de Tornavacas fault, and the Western sector which is the Sierra de Béjar.

The range's snowline was measured at 1800-1900 meters in 1916.

== Eastern section ==
Rises in the south near the North Tietar fault. The northern limit of the horst is structured by a system of faults that run to the north-east, such as the Burguillo fault, and also in an east–west direction, like the Navaluenga fault, along which the Alberche river runs. The highest peaks of this sector are the following:

- Alto del Mirlo 1.770 m (Casillas)
- La Escusa 1.960 m
- Gamonosa 1.993 m (Casavieja)
- Lanchamala 1.999 m (Piedralaves)
- El Torozo 2.025 m
- Risco de Miravalles 2.010 m (Gavilanes)
- Risco del Artuñero 2.011 m
- Cabezo de Gavilanes 2.190 m (Gavilanes)

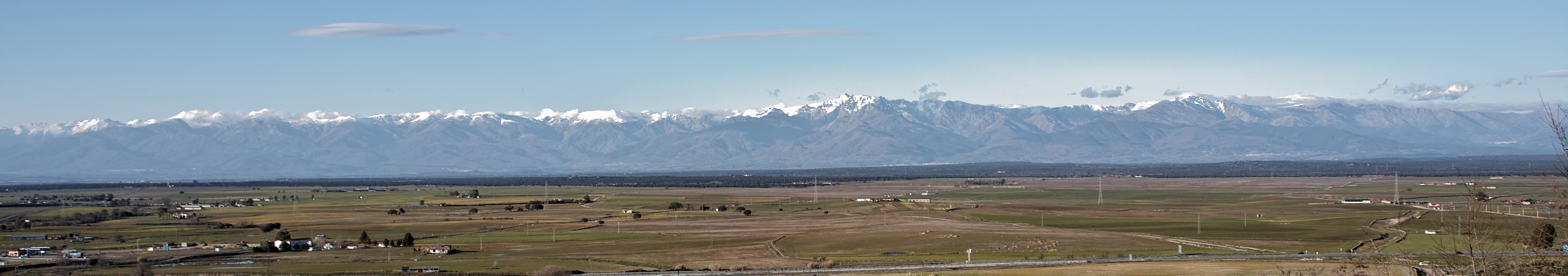
The South face of the Sierra de Gredos mountain range, seen from Oropesa (Toledo).

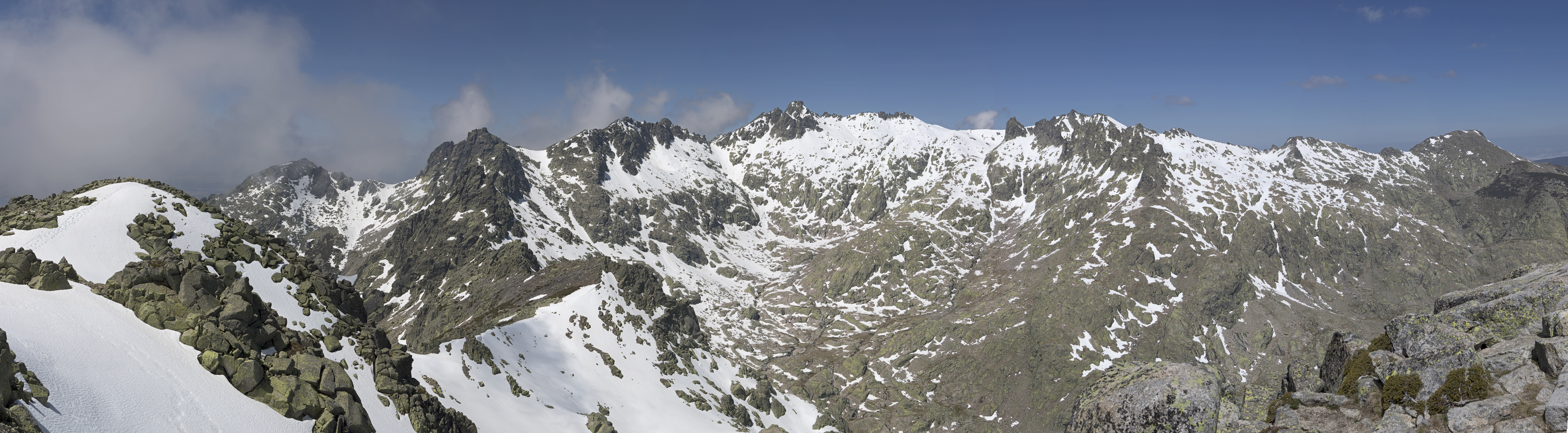
The North face of Circo de Gredos, seen from Morezon

== Lakes ==
- Laguna Grande de Gredos
- Las Cinco Lagunas
- Laguna del Barco
- Laguna de los Caballeros
- Laguna de la Nava
- Lagunas del Trampal
- Laguna del Duque

== Fauna ==
The main species to be found in the Sierra de Gredos are the following:

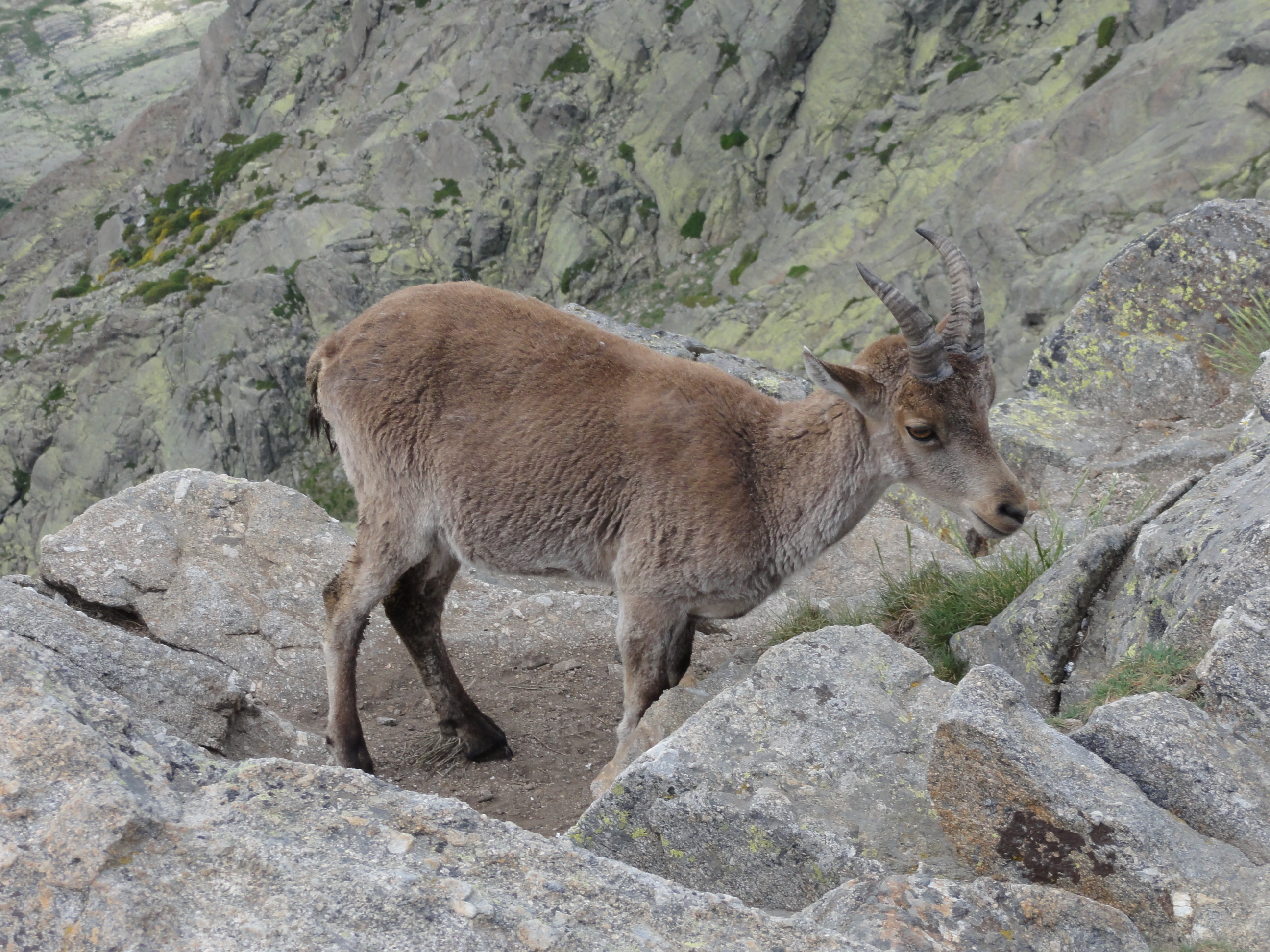
The Spanish ibex (Capra pyrenaica). Sierra de Gredos

- The Iberian ibex (Capra pyrenaica)
- The roe deer (Capreolus capreolus)
- The red-legged partridge (Alectoris rufa)
- The golden eagle (Aquila chrysaetos)
- The Spanish imperial eagle (Aquila adalberti)
- The European honey buzzard (Pernis apivorus)
- The cinereous vulture (Aegypius monachus)
- The griffon vulture (Gyps fulvus)
- The black stork (Ciconia negra)

=== Endemic species ===
- The common toad of Gredos (Bufo bufo gredosicola)
- The fire salamander of Almanzor (Salamandra salamandra almanzoris)
- The European snow vole of Avila (Microtus nivalis abulensis)
- The western Spanish ibex (Capra pyrenaica victoriae)
- The lagartija carpetana (Iberolacerta cyreni), a species of lizard
- The marbled teal (Marmaronetta angustirostris)
- The Iberian barbel (Luciobarbus comizo)

== Flora ==
The variety of plant life in the Sierra de Gredos is closely related to the altitude at which it is found. In ascending order, the following species of trees can be found: holm oak (or holly oak), chestnut, alder, rowan (or mountain ash), birch, aspen, willow, Pyrenean oak, replaced in some areas by pine. At higher altitudes there are mostly bushes of the genus Cytisus (brooms), juniper and several species of camomile.

Four different layers of vegetation have been identified:.

- the base layer, or holm oak layer, 300–550 m
- the Pyrenean oak layer, 550–1800 m
- the broom layer, 1800–2300 m
- and the open field layer at the peaks, 2300–2600 m

== Tourism ==
Tourists visit the Sierra de Gredos to hike and stargaze.

== See also ==
- Sistema Central
- Sierra de Gredos Regional Park
