= Hoyos del Espino =

- Municipality
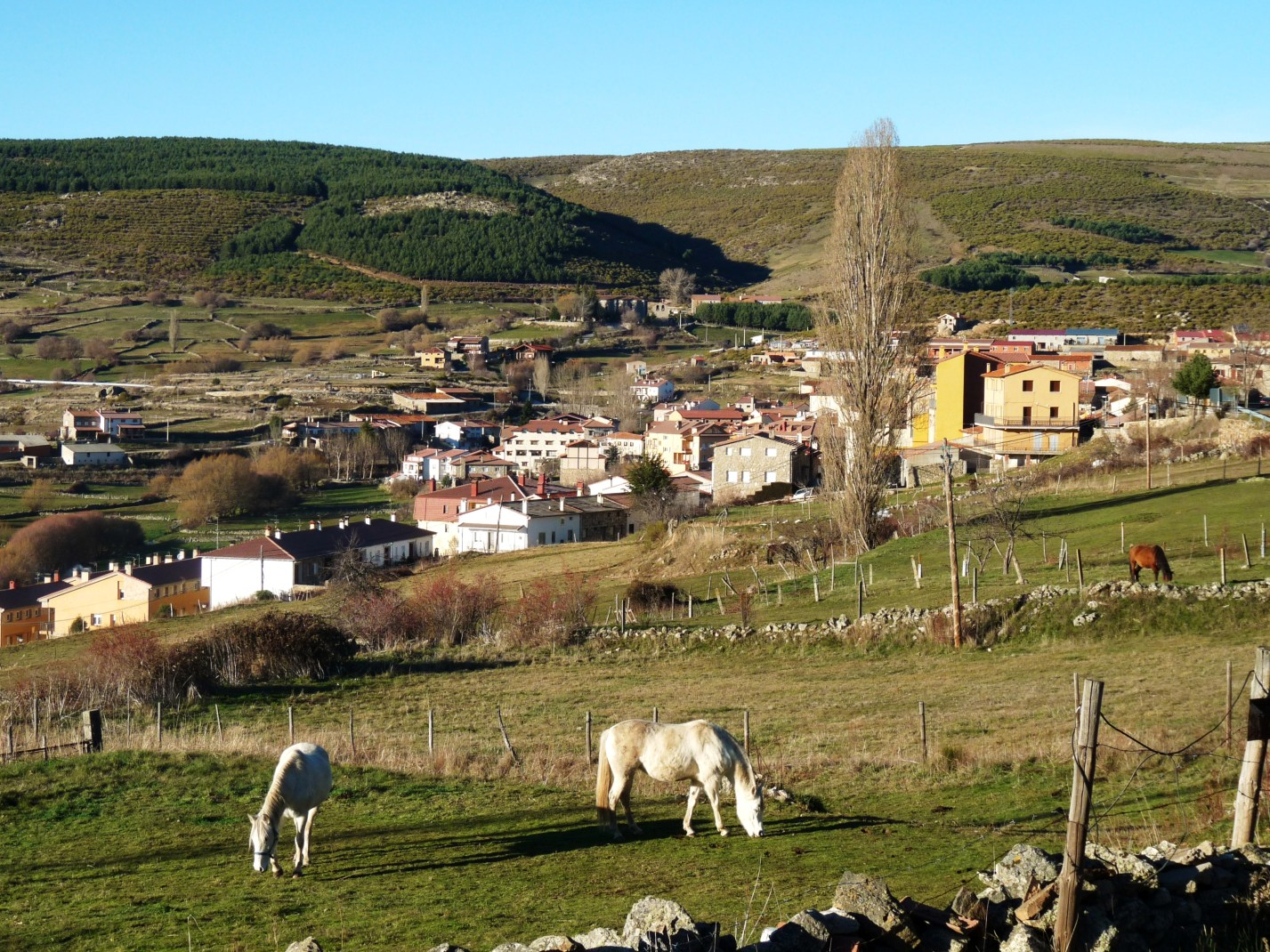
- View of Hoyos del Espino.

- Flag Coat of arms

- Location in Spain. Hoyos del Espino (Castile and León)
- Coordinates: 40°21′24″N 5°10′27″W
- Country: Spain
- Autonomous community: Castile and León
- Province: Ávila
- Municipality: Hoyos del Espino

Area
  - Total: 53 km^{2} (20 sq mi)

Population (2025-01-01)
  - Total: 350
  - Density: 6.6/km^{2} (17/sq mi)
- Time zone: UTC+1 (CET)
  - Summer (DST): UTC+2 (CEST)
- Website: Official website

Hoyos del Espino is a municipality located in the province of Ávila, Castile and León, Spain.The area is located at an elevation of 1,484 metres (4,869 ft) above sea level.

The village hosts the music festival "Músicos en la naturaleza" (Musicians in nature), where world-renowned artists including Sting, Bob Dylan and Deep Purple have performed since the first edition in 2006.

== Population ==
Historical population
Year	Pop.	±% p.a.
2023	345	—
2024	344	−0.29%
2025	350	+1.74%
Source: INE
