= Guisando, Ávila =

Guisando
- Municipality
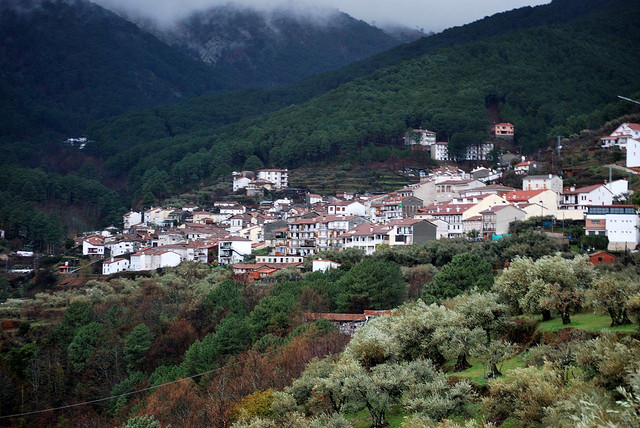
- View of Guisando

- Flag Coat of arms

- Location in Spain. Guisando (Spain)
- Coordinates: 40°13′18″N 5°08′23″W
- Country: Spain
- Autonomous community: Castile and León
- Province: Ávila
- Municipality: Guisando

Area
  - Total: 37.38 km^{2} (14.43 sq mi)
- Elevation: 760 m (2,490 ft)

Population (2025-01-01)
  - Total: 458
  - Density: 12.3/km^{2} (31.7/sq mi)
- Time zone: UTC+1 (CET)
  - Summer (DST): UTC+2 (CEST)
- Website: Official website

Guisando is a municipality located in the province of Ávila, Castile and León, Spain. According to the 2006 census (INE), the municipality had a population of 620 inhabitants.

The famous Bulls of Guisando are actually not in the modern municipality but in neighbouring El Tiemblo.

== Population ==
Historical population
Year	Pop.	±% p.a.
2023	488	—
2024	474	−2.87%
2025	458	−3.38%
Source: INE
