= Arenas de San Pedro =

- municipality
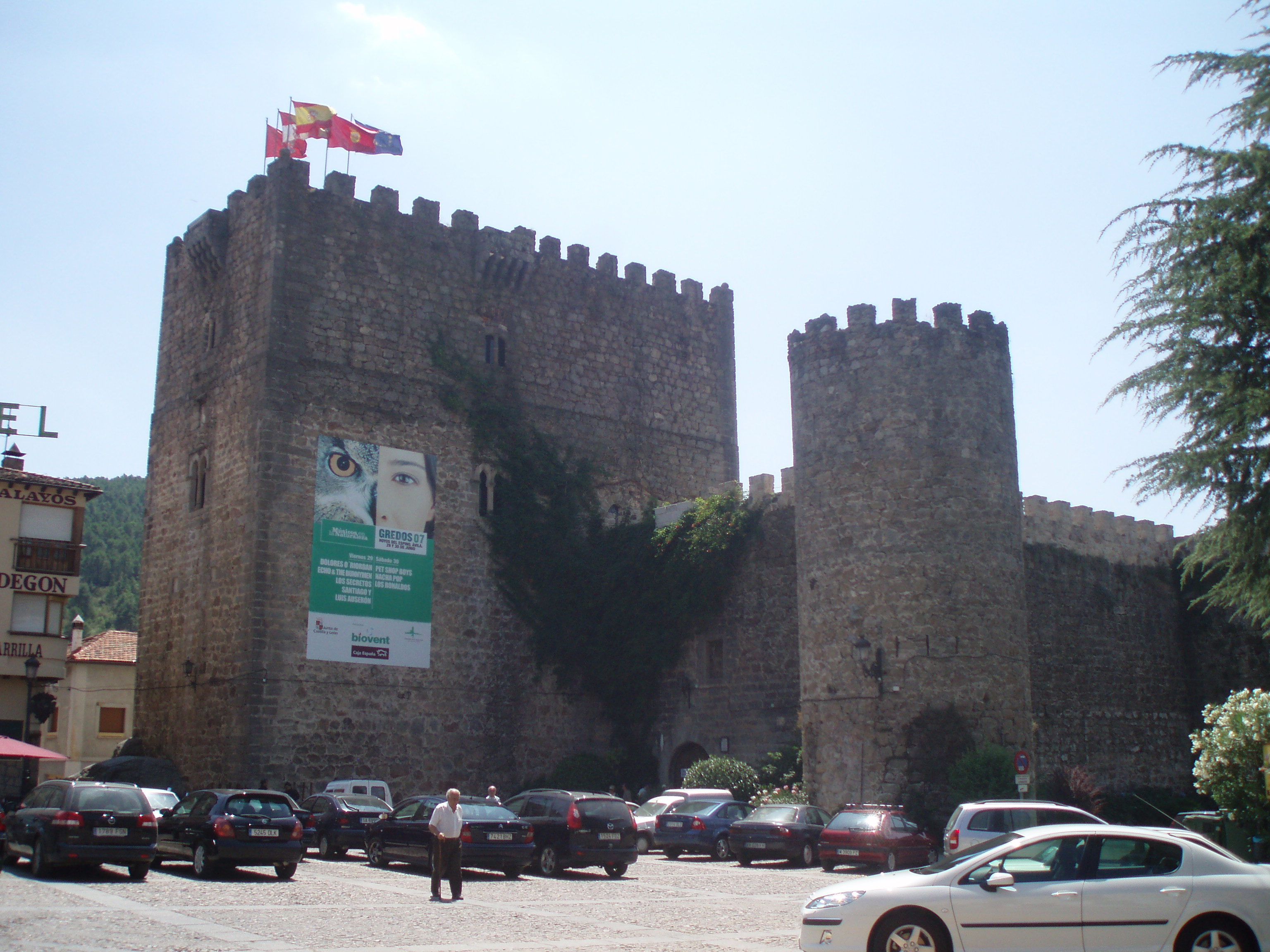
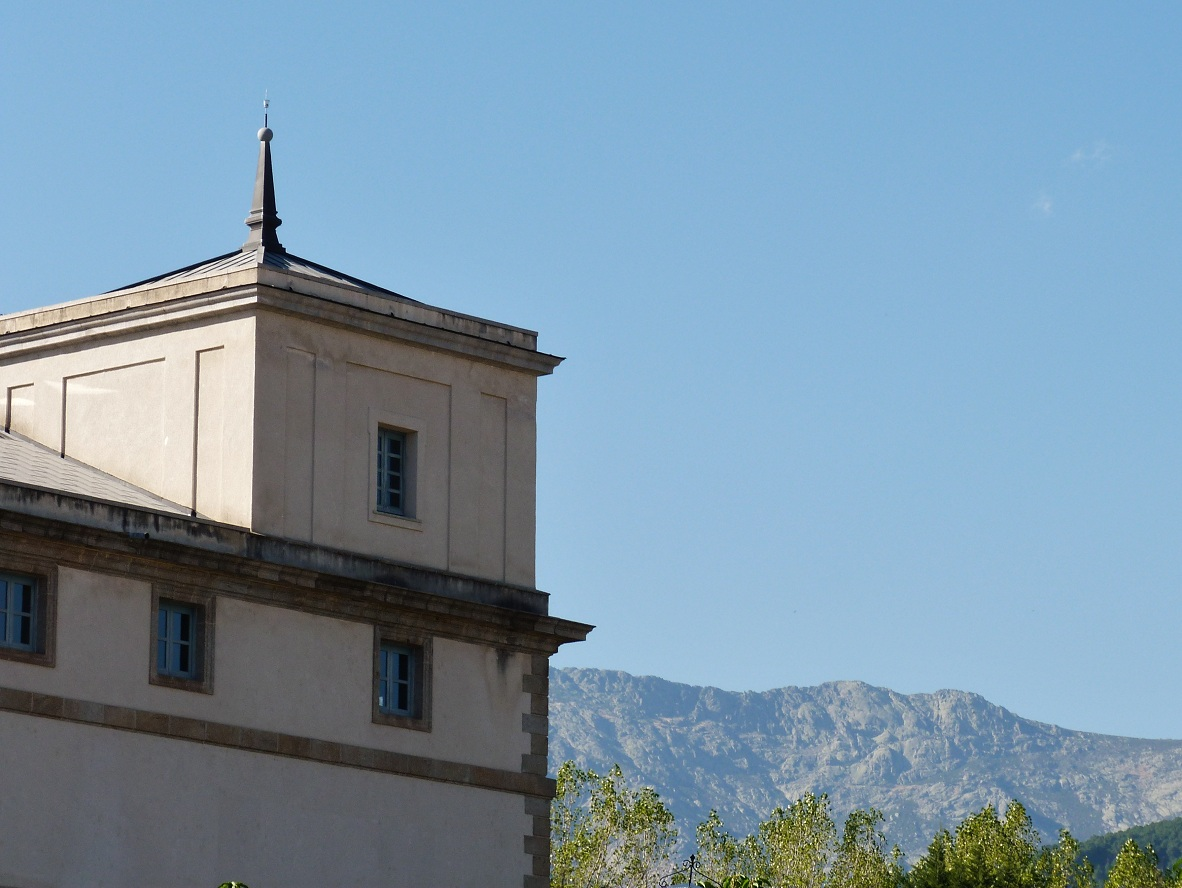
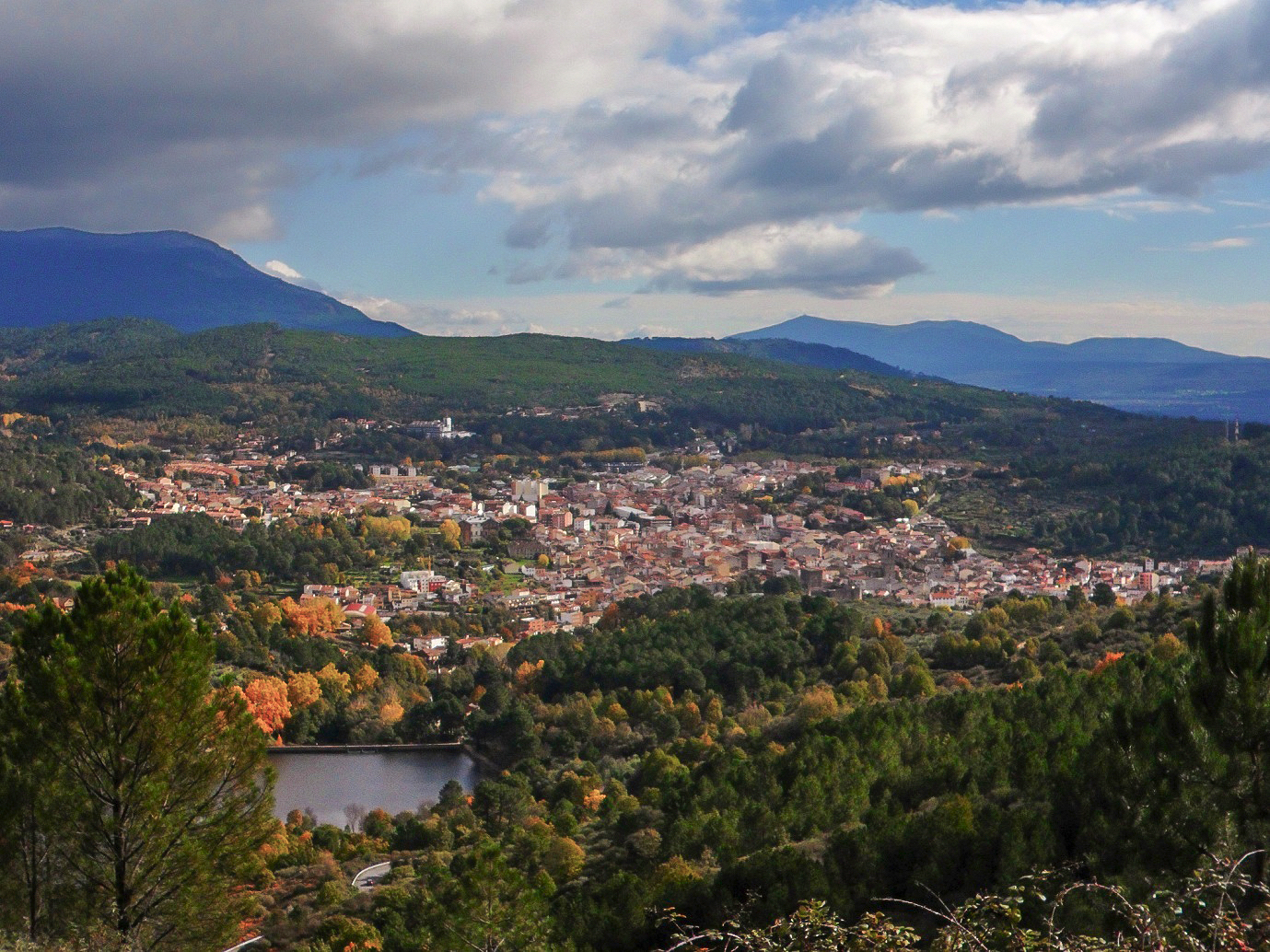
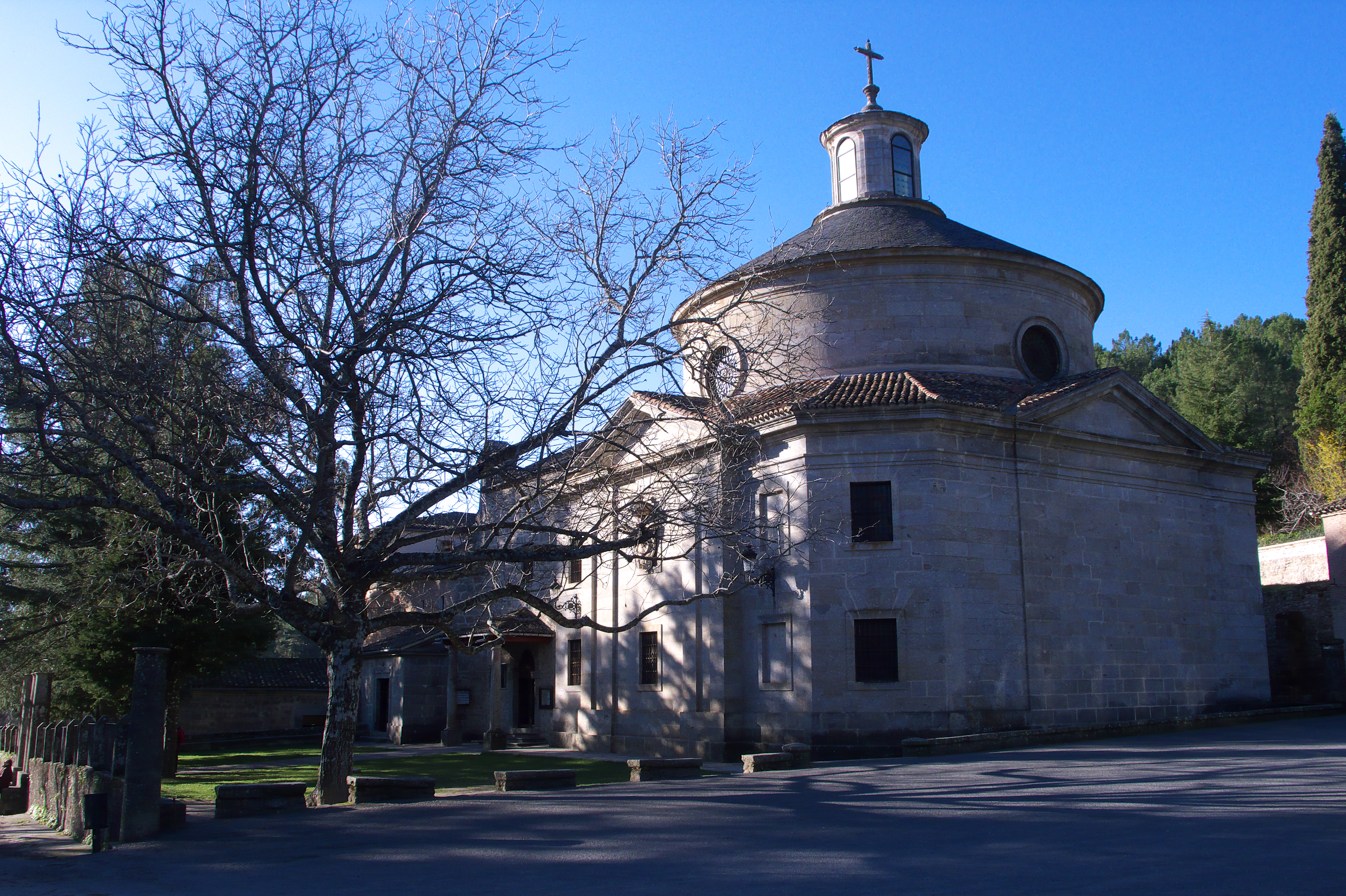
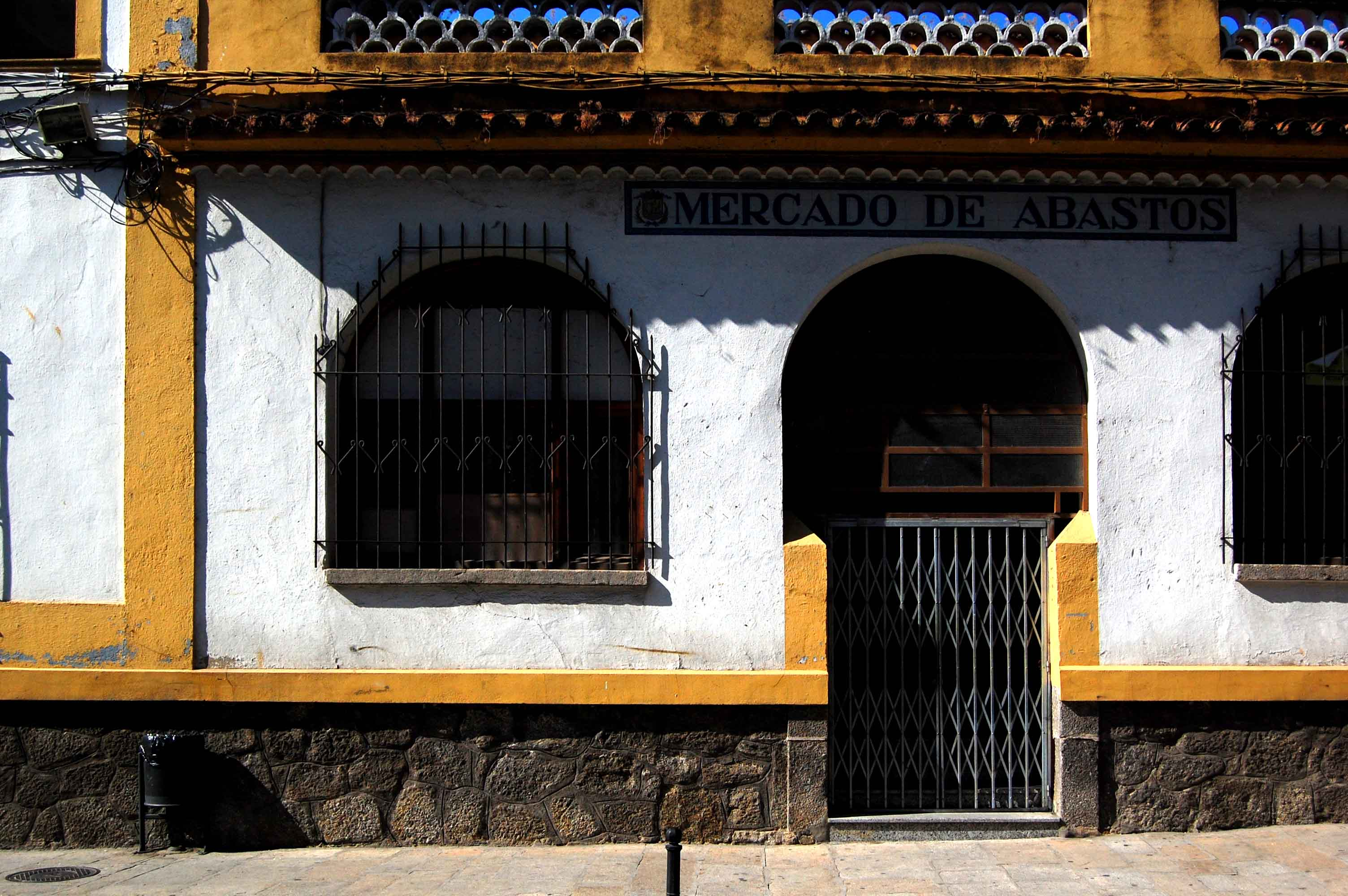
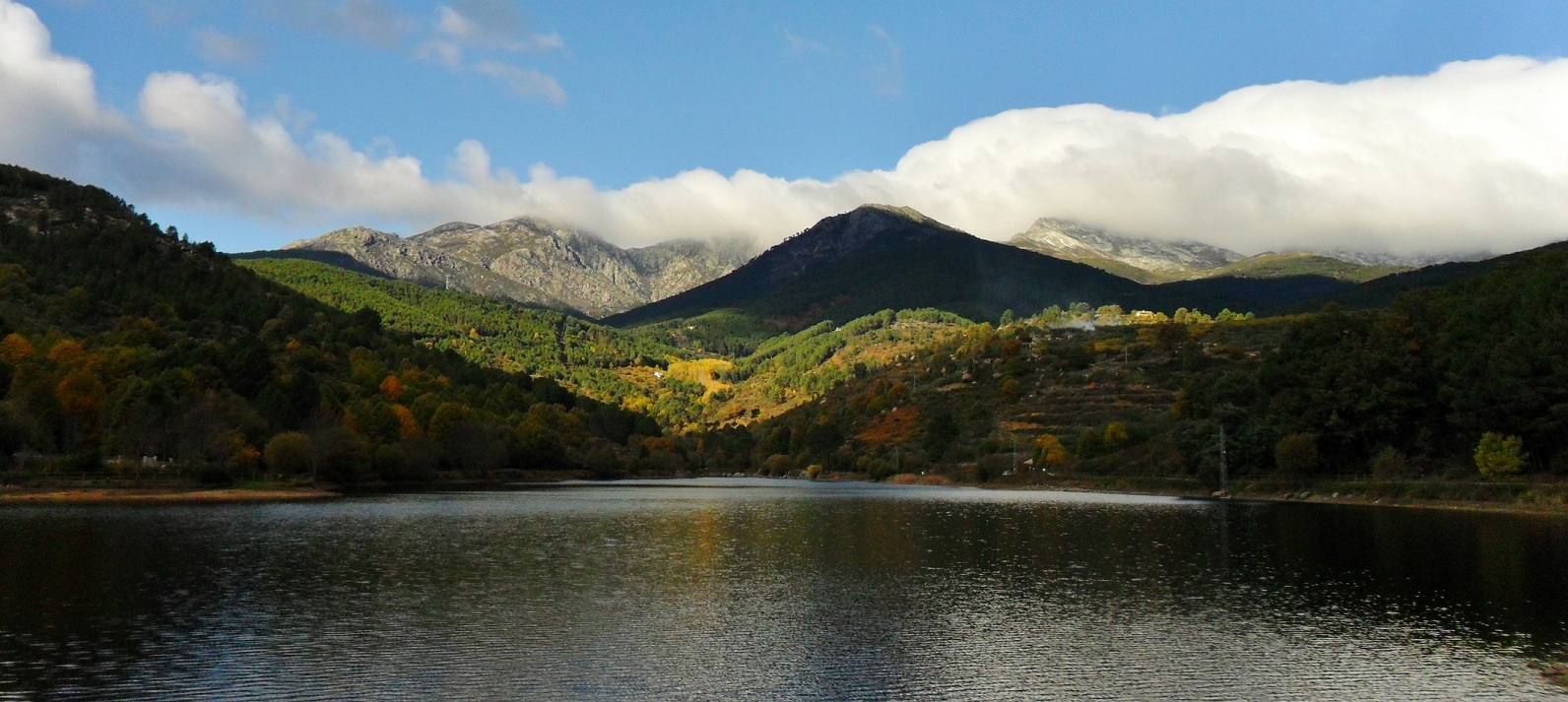

- Flag Coat of arms

- Location in Spain. Arenas de San Pedro (Spain)
- Coordinates: 40°12′32″N 5°05′28″W
- Country: Spain
- Autonomous community: Castile and León
- Province: Ávila
- Municipality: Arenas de San Pedro

Area
  - Total: 194.85 km^{2} (75.23 sq mi)
- Elevation: 510 m (1,670 ft)

Population (2025-01-01)
  - Total: 6,460
  - Density: 33.2/km^{2} (85.9/sq mi)
- Time zone: UTC+1 (CET)
  - Summer (DST): UTC+2 (CEST)
- Website: Official website

Arenas de San Pedro is a municipality located in the province of Ávila, Castile and León, Spain. According to the 2025 census (INE), the municipality has a population of 6,460 inhabitants. Its seal depicts a large castle located in the town. The seal says "Siempre incendiada y siempre fiel", meaning "always on fire and always faithful". This is because the town has been burned down and pillaged many times in its history.

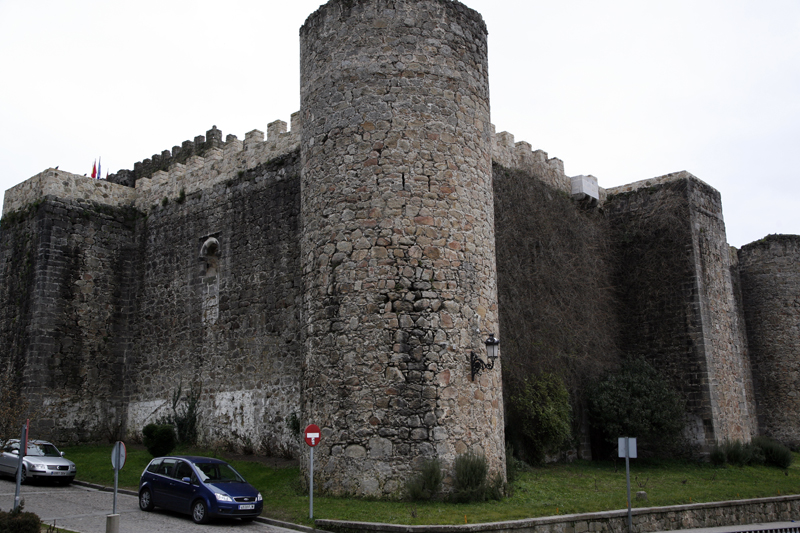
Arenas de San Pedro Castle, built in the Middle Ages.

== Population ==
Historical population
Year	Pop.	±% p.a.
2023	6,464	—
2024	6,438	−0.40%
2025	6,460	+0.34%
Source: INE
