= Majaelrayo =

Majaelrayo, Spain
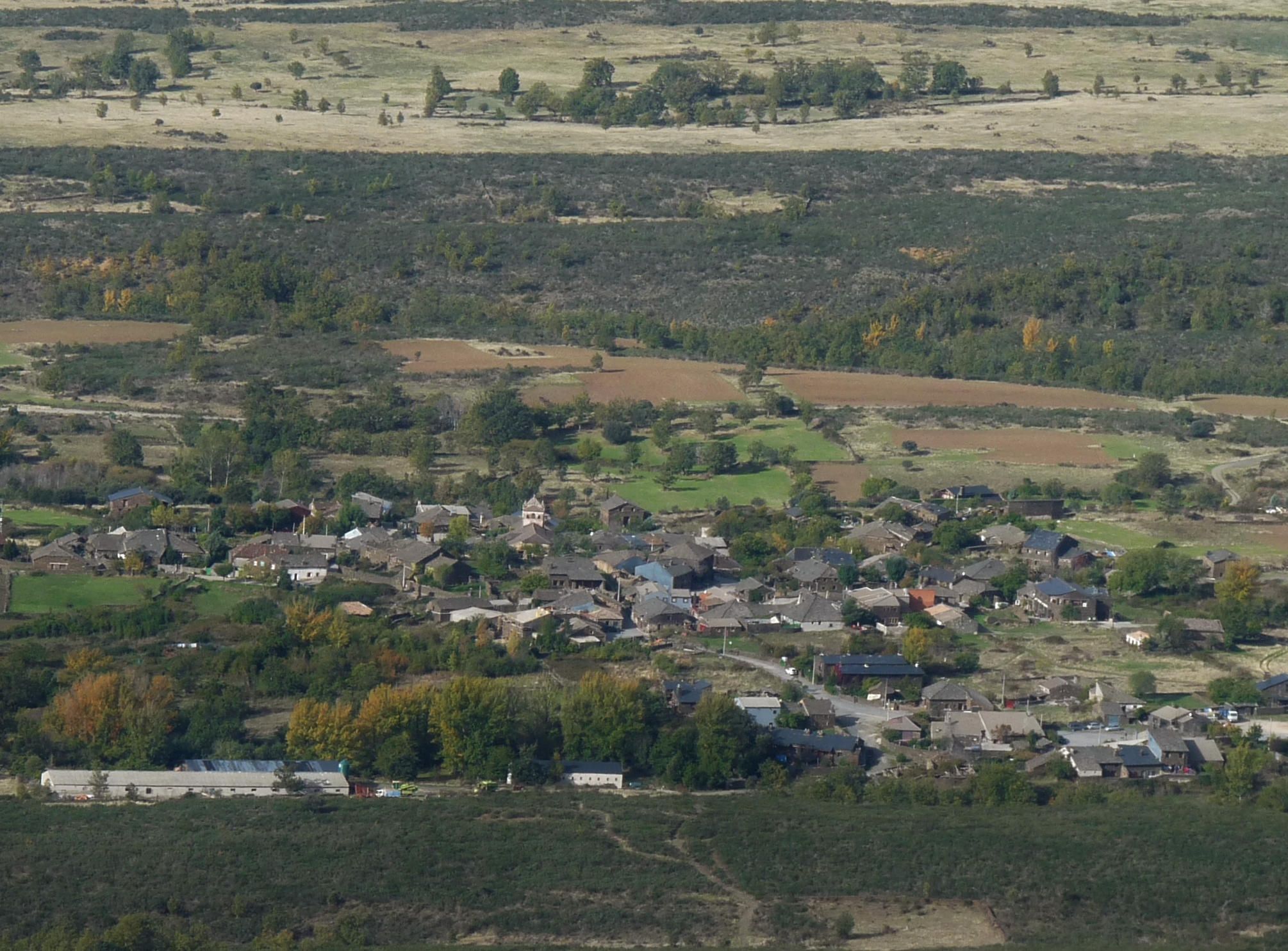

- Location within Province of Guadalajara Location within Castilla-La Mancha Location within Spain
- Country: Spain
- Autonomous community: Castile-La Mancha
- Province: Guadalajara
- Municipality: Majaelrayo

Area
  - Total: 54.94 km^{2} (21.21 sq mi)
- Elevation: 1,186 m (3,891 ft)

Population (2025-01-01)
  - Total: 60
  - Density: 1.1/km^{2} (2.8/sq mi)
- Time zone: UTC+1 (CET)
  - Summer (DST): UTC+2 (CEST)

Majaelrayo is a municipality located in the province of Guadalajara, Castile-La Mancha, Spain. According to the 2004 census (INE), the municipality had a population of 72 inhabitants.
