= Laguna Grande de Peñalara =

Lake in Spain

- Laguna de Peñalara
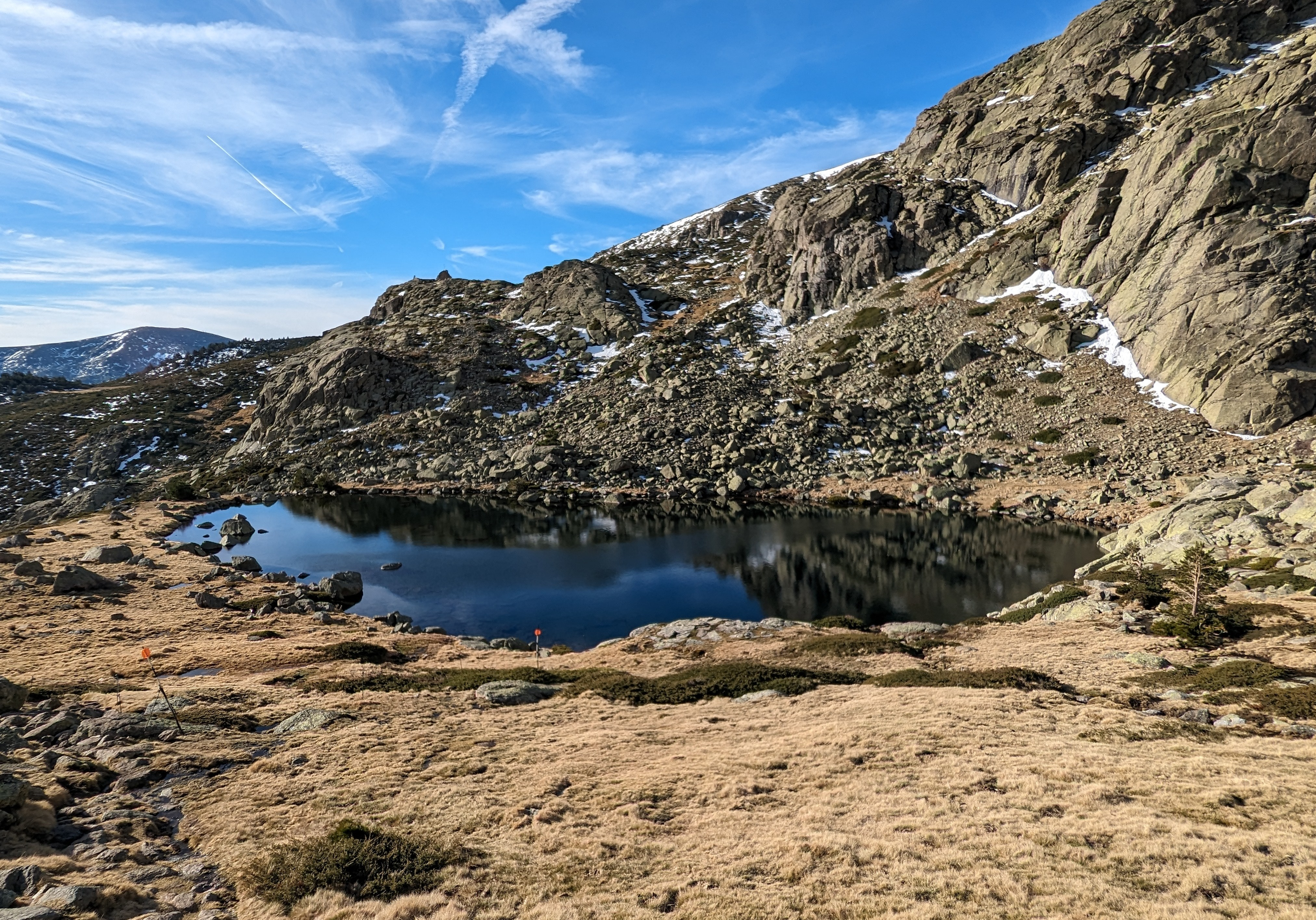
- View of the lake
- Interactive map of Laguna Grande de Peñalara
- Location: Rascafría
- Coordinates: 40°50′23.11″N 3°57′25.04″W
- Type: Glacial lake
- Primary inflows: Runoff in the Peñalara cirque
- Primary outflows: Laguna de Peñalara Stream
- Basin countries: Spain
- Frozen: From December to March

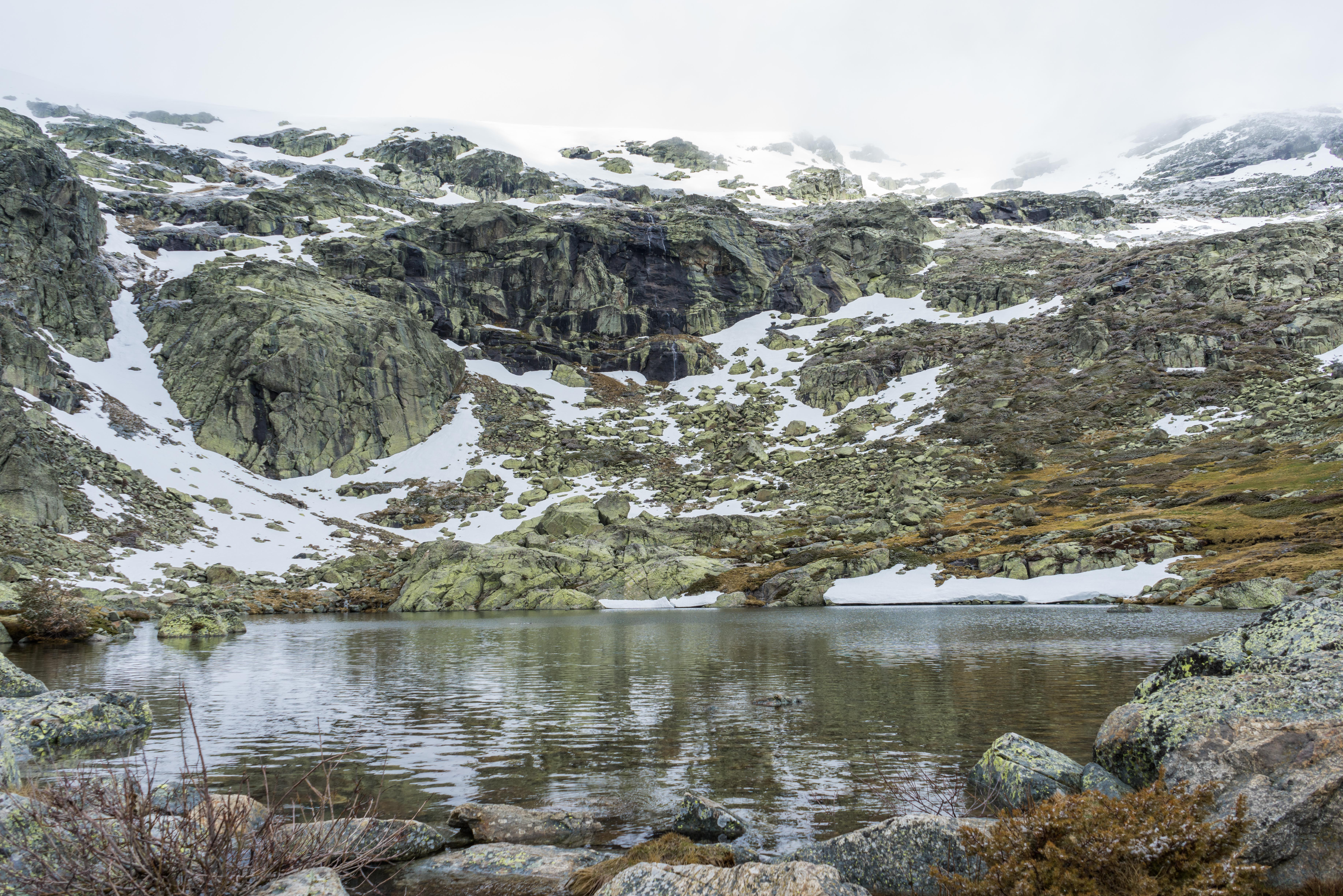
View of the lake

The Laguna Grande de Peñalara (in English: Great Peñalara Lake), also known as Laguna de Peñalara, is a lake of glacial origin located at the bottom of the Peñalara cirque, at 2017 meters altitude, in the central area of the Sierra de Guadarrama, belonging to the Sistema Central, in the Iberian Peninsula. It is located within the Guadarrama National Park, in the Spanish municipality of Rascafría (Community of Madrid).

== Description ==
This permanent ovoid-shaped lake has a surface area of 5779 m². Its small volume, 11,563 m³, means that certain environmental factors such as wind and precipitation have a faster and more drastic influence on the conditions of the water body than in larger lakes. The surface area of its drainage basin is 465,560 m². It has a perimeter of 650 m, a maximum length of 127 m, a maximum width of 73 m, and an average depth of 2 m. The water body is located at an altitude of 2017 meters above sea level and its maximum depth is 4.8 meters, in its northern part. It appears in the novel Camino de perfección (1902), by Pío Baroja.

It is surrounded by meadows and rocky areas (gneiss) that have some high mountain scrubs such as piorno and creeping juniper. Since the lake remains frozen from December to March due to the sub-zero temperatures in the area, no fish inhabit its waters, but there are amphibians and birds living there, such as the bluethroat, northern wheatear, the hedge sparrow, and the rock thrush. The environment of the lake has a maximum degree of protection within the Peñalara Natural Park, so visitors can only pass through certain places.

== Access ==
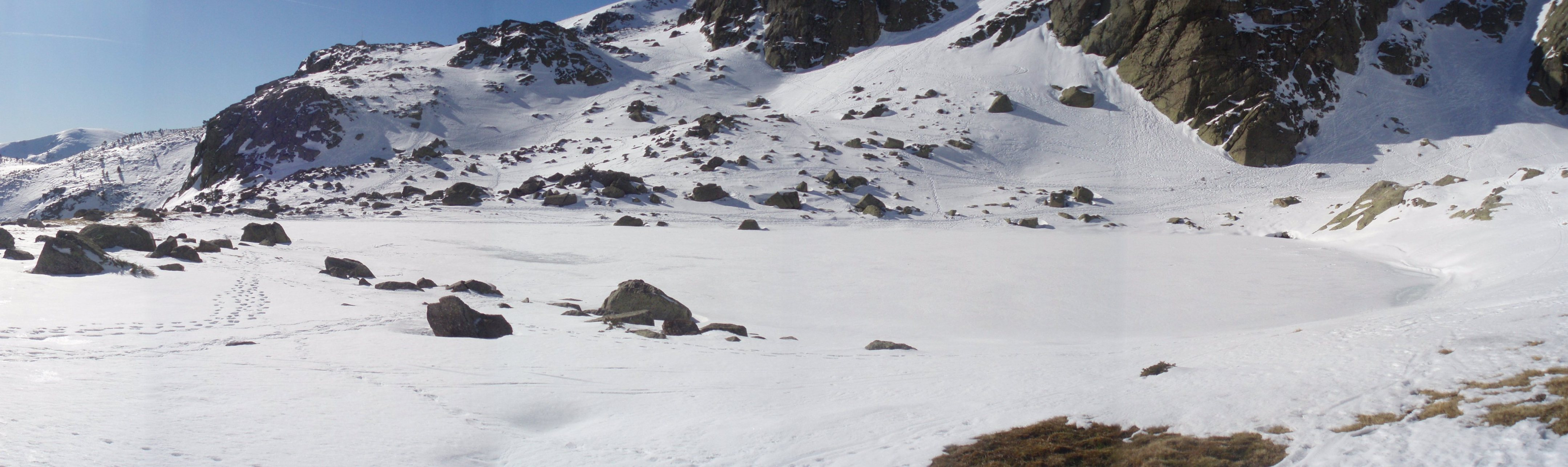
The lake under an ice cap during winter

This lake is accessed by a well-marked road that leaves the Puerto de Cotos to the northeast and then turns northwest to enter the Peñalara cirque. It reaches the lake after 3 km of travel. It is the largest permanent lake in the Guadarrama National Park — previously the smaller Peñalara Natural Park — and the most visited by hikers.

== See also ==
- Laguna Chica de Peñalara
- Laguna de los Claveles
- Laguna de los Pájaros
