= Maratón Alpino Madrileño =

The Maratón Alpino Madrileño or Madrid Alpine Marathon is a trail running race that takes place on Sierra de Guadarrama, in Madrid (Spain), in mid-June. This race covers nearly 45 kilometres (28 mi) with 4,700 metres (15,400 ft) of altitude change. Since 2006, the start and the end points of the race are located in Cercedilla, and its course goes through Alto del Telégrafo, Puerto de Navacerrada, Bola del Mundo (also known as Alto de las Guarramillas), Puerto de Cotos, Pico Peñalara (the highest point of Madrid) and the glacial Peñalara lakes. The Tierra Trágame club is in charge of organizing this race.

The Maratón Alpino Madrileño belongs to several different competition circuits, as Circuito Alpino, Buff Skyrunning World Trail Series.

== History ==
The origin of the Maratón Alpino Madrileño goes back to 1997, when Miguel Caselles, Victoria Sánchez and Juan Manuel Agejas thought about organizing a marathon covering the most significant areas of Sierra de Guadarrama. In this way, the first edition of this race took place on June 8, 1997.

This race initially started and ended in Puerto de Navacerrada. Its course went to Puerto de Cotos, Peña Citores, Laguna de los Pájaros, Puerto de Cotos (2nd time), Cabezas de Hierro, Puerto de Navacerrada (2nd time) and Puerto de la Fuenfría.

In 2000, the race climbed for the first time to Peñalara, the highest peak of Madrid, and to Bola del Mundo (Alto del Guarramillas), adding some extra difficult to its though and technical terrain. In 2004, the race also added Siete Picos to its course.

In 2006, due to its 10th anniversary, the course of the Maratón Alpino Madrileño was changed: instead of locating the start and end points in the traditional Puerto de Navacerrada, both of them were moved to Cercedilla. This fact increased the local participation and encouragement and improves the infrastructure of the race. In addition, the new course modified some of the race scenarios with losing any toughness. Since then, the new course of Maratón Alpino Madrileño has been maintained, starting and finishing in Cercedilla and going through Alto del Telégrafo, Puerto de Navacerrada, Bola del Mundo, Puerto de Cotos, Peña Citores, Peñalara and Laguna de los Pájaros.

The Maratón Alpino Madrileño has been part of Adidas Trail Challenge, Forum Trail Challenge and Alpino AireLibre-Corricolari circuits (this last one along with Marathon Alpine Galarleiz and Cross Alpino Mulhacén). Furthermore, Maratón Alpino Madrileño has been part of the World FSA calendar (Federation of Sports at Altitude.

Since the first edition of this race, Maratón Alpino Madrileño has been the site of different important trail running events:

- 2000: Spain Skyrace Championship.
- 2001: Race belonging to the I "Copa de España de Carreras de Montaña" (Spain Mountain Races Cup) organized by the FEDME

(Spanish Federation of Mountain Sports and Climb).

- 2002: Spanish championship of mountain races (1st edition of this event in Spain).
- 2003: Race belonging to the FSA World Championship.
- 2005: Spanish Championship of mountain races.

Within past editions, the best Spanish trail runners have taken part in this race: Quico Soler, Agustí Roc, Félix Magunagoicoechea, Óscar Ballsels, Jordi Martín, Joseba Cubillo, Miguel Ángel Sánchez, Miguel A. Perdiguero, Lorenzo Bermejo, Esteve Canal, Carlos Pitarch, Alberto Zerain, Gaizka Itza, Juan Ramón Morán, Fernando García, Raúl García, Ignacio Álvarez. And women such as Monica Aguilera, Sonia Morán, Agnés Riera, Yolanda Santiuste, Emma Roca, Anna Serra, Teresa Roca, Teresa Forn, Garbiñe Barquín, Marta Etna Vidal, Ana Isabel Estévez, etc.

In addition, the elite trail runners around the world have been running the Maratón Alpino Madrileño: Corinne Favre, Jean Pellissier, Bruno Brunod, and Carlo Bellati.

As a curious data, Maraton Alpino Madrileño was the first alpine race offered by the Internet in real time, thanks to different cameras located along the route (including the most important peaks).

== The Numbers of the Maratón Alpino Madrileño ==
- Location: Sierra de Guadarrama (Madrid, Spain)
- Length: 44 km approximately
- Maximum height: 2,430 m.
- Minimum height: 1,188 m.
- Total altitude change: 4,700 m.
- 40% of the race is located above 2,000 m altitude.
- 70% of the race is technical terrain.
- Cutt-off time: 9 hours.

== Winners ==
Year	Men winner	Women winner
1997	Joseba Cubillo de la Hoz	Sonia Morán Luis
1998	José Félix Magunagoicoechea Fernández	Sonia Morán Luis
1999	Óscar Balsells Sales	Agnès Riera Ferrán
2000	Jordi Martín Pascual	Yolanda Santiuste Blázquez
2001	Quico Soler Escamez	Anna Serra Salame
2002	Esteve Canal Ferres	Anna Serra Salame
2003	(Spain) Agustí Roc Amador	(France) Corinne Favre
2004	Luis Alfonso Rodríguez Robledo	Gloria Serrazina
2005	Fernando García Herreros	Ana Isabel Estévez García
2006	Manuel Perozo Mosquero	Gloria Serrazina
2007	Pedro José Hernández Sánchez	Salud Díaz García
2008	Andrew Symonds	Mónica Aguilera i Viladomiu
2009	Aurelio Antonio Olivar Roldán	Nerea Martínez Urruzola
2010	(Spain) Raúl García Castán	(Spain) Gloria Serrazina
2011	(Spain) Miguel Heras Hernandez	(Spain) María Luisa García
2013	(Spain) Alfredo Gil Garcia	(Spain) Sofía García Bardoll
2014	(Morocco) Zaid Ait Malek	(Spain) Ana Isabel Paz Bermudez
2015	(Spain) Alfredo Gil Garcia	(Spain) Azahara García
2016	(Spain) Manuel Merillas Moledo	(Spain) Azahara García
2017	(Spain) Noel Burgos Gomez	(Spain) Ana Isabel Paz Bermudez

== Survivors and Megasurvivors ==
The Maratón Alpino Madrileño is the only race in the world where there are no finishers, but survivors. This special word refers to all the runners that reach the finish line of the race. The use of the word survivor reflects in a special way the hardness of this alpine race.

In addition, the survivors of all the editions are called megasurvivors. Current megasurvivors are (in alphabetical order):

- Manuel Bejarano Vázquez
- Jesús Blázquez Álvarez
- Ángel Bonilla de Francisco
- José Manuel Calleja Checa
- Jesús Castilla Catalán
- Basilio García Pérez (chase/support runner)
- Enrique Garrandes Torralba
- José Antonio Rodrigo Lozano
- Francisco Rodríguez García
- José Luis Sánchez García
- José Luis Santos Hernández

== Records ==
- Men: Andrew Symonds (United Kingdom): 4h09:27 (2008)
- Women: Mónica Aguilera (Spain): 5h29:33 (2008)

== See also ==
- Puerto de Cotos
