= Mònica Aguilera Viladomiu =

Spanish mountain and raid runner

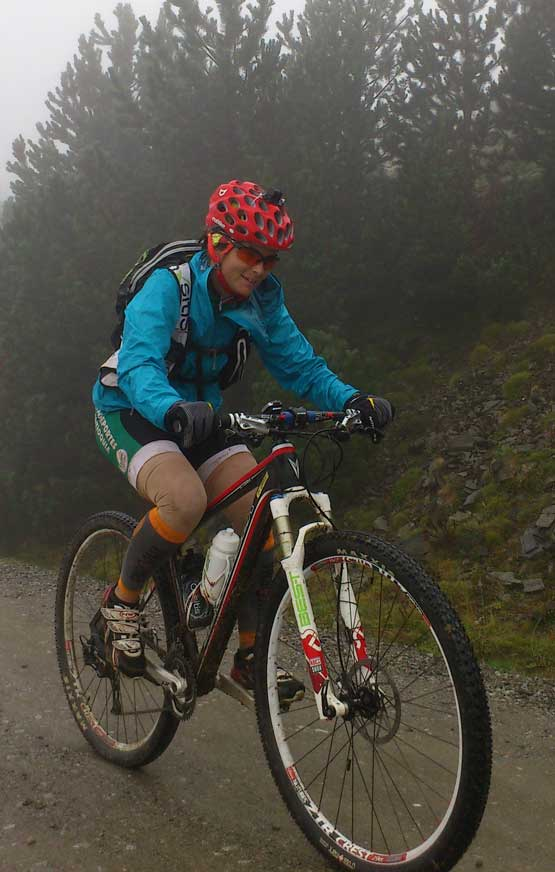
Mònica Aguilera biking during the Raid Bimbache Extrem Playa de Aro 2013, part of the Adventure Racing World Series.

Mònica Aguilera Viladomiu (born 5 January 1974 in Barcelona) is a trail runner, adventure raids runner and foot and mountain bike orienteer. She started to run orienteering races in the mid 1990s. Her first raid was Raid Verd in Catalonia in 1997.

== Selected results ==
- World Champion of X-Adventure Raid Series World Cup in 2000 and 2001.
- 1st, Marathon des Sables in 2010
- 2nd and 3rd, Ultra-Trail du Mont-Blanc (166 km) in 2007 and 2009
- 1st, Transvulcania Ultramaratón of 83 km in 2011.
- 1st, Transgrancanaria of 123 km in 2009.
- 1st, Maratón Alpino Madrileño in 2008.
- 1st, Spanish Mountain Bike Orienteering Championship in different distances in 2013, 2014, 2015, 2016 and 2017.
- Participated in World Mountain Bike Orienteering Championships with the national Spanish team in 2011, 2013, 2014, 2015, 2016 and 2017. Also participated and won the World Masters (veterans) Mountain Bike Orienteering Championships in 2015 and 2016.
