= Peñalara Cirque =

Cirque in Peñalara Natural Park, Spain

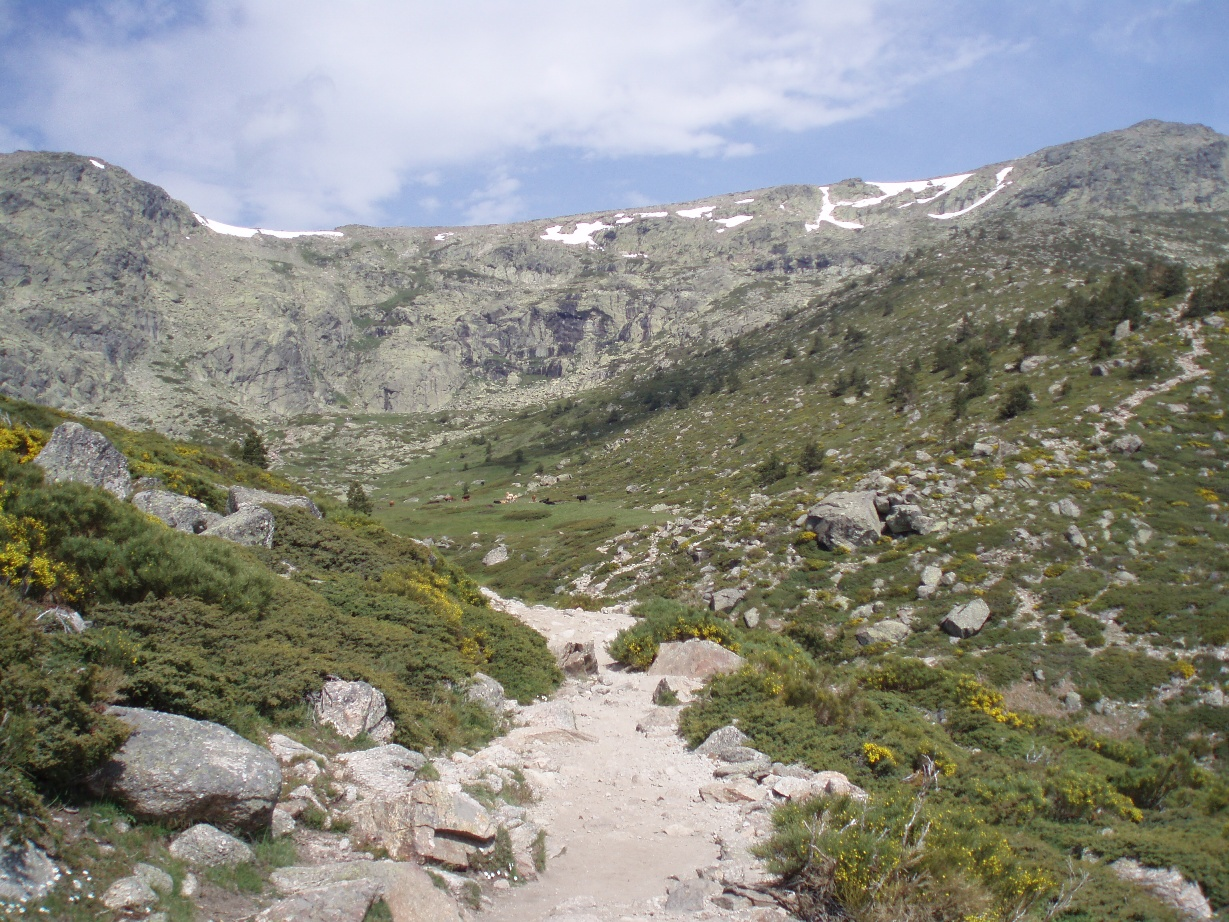
Northwest sector of the Peñalara cirque seen from the road leading to the Laguna Grande de Peñalara.

Peñalara glacial cirque (Spanish: Circo glaciar de Peñalara. Also known as Hoya de Peñalara and Hoya del Toril) is a cirque glacier located within the Peñalara Natural Park, in the center of the Sierra de Guadarrama (mountain range belonging to the Central System). It is the most extensive of the mountain range with its 140 hectares approximately. Administratively it is within the municipality of Rascafría, a Spanish municipality located in the northwest of the Community of Madrid.

This cirque, which was created 1.8 million years ago thanks to glacier action, consists of two sectors or glacier lakes. One of them is located in the northeast of the cirque and today houses in its central area the Laguna Grande de Peñalara, and the other is in the southwest and has a less abrupt relief. Sports such as hiking and, especially, climbing are practiced in the circus, where there are nearly 150 routes. There is a massive influx of mountaineers and tourists throughout the year, as evidenced by the 133,000 annual visitors in 2006.

== Topographical relief ==
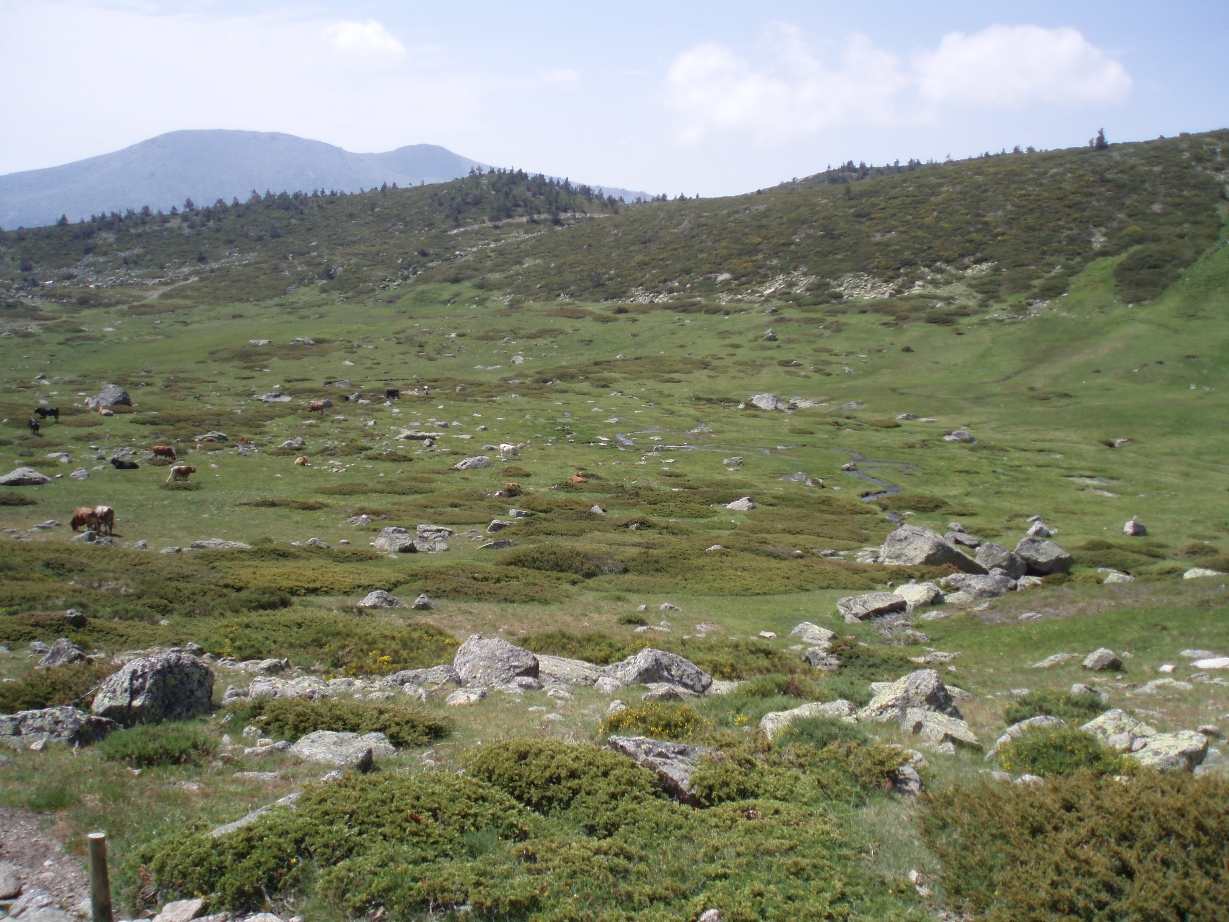
Meadow at the base of the northwest sector of the cirque dotted with streams. Behind the moraine we can see the Cabezas de Hierro.

This cirque glacier is located on the eastern slope of the southern part of the Peñalara massif. The three mountains that make up this part of the massif are, in order from south to north, the Hermana Menor (2271 m), the Hermana Mayor (2285 m) and the Peak of Peñalara (2428 m), which is the highest in the Sierra de Guadarrama. This cornice of peaks serves as the western limit of the cirque. This cornice of peaks is the western limit of the cirque. This in turn consists of two sectors separated by a moraine. The northernmost, the northeastern sector, is the more excavated of the two and at its bottom is the Laguna Grande de Peñalara. The southernmost, the southwestern sector, has a less abrupt relief, no permanent lagoons and less surface area than the first. Both sectors are separated by a moraine of about 500 meters long that begins at the peak of the Hermana Mayor and extends eastward. The Peñalara cirque is the largest in the Sierra de Guadarrama and one of the few in the Central System. It has an approximate area of just over 140 hectares; the base has an altitude between 1950 and 2100 meters above sea level (masl), and the rocky walls to the west reach a height of between 200 and 300 meters.

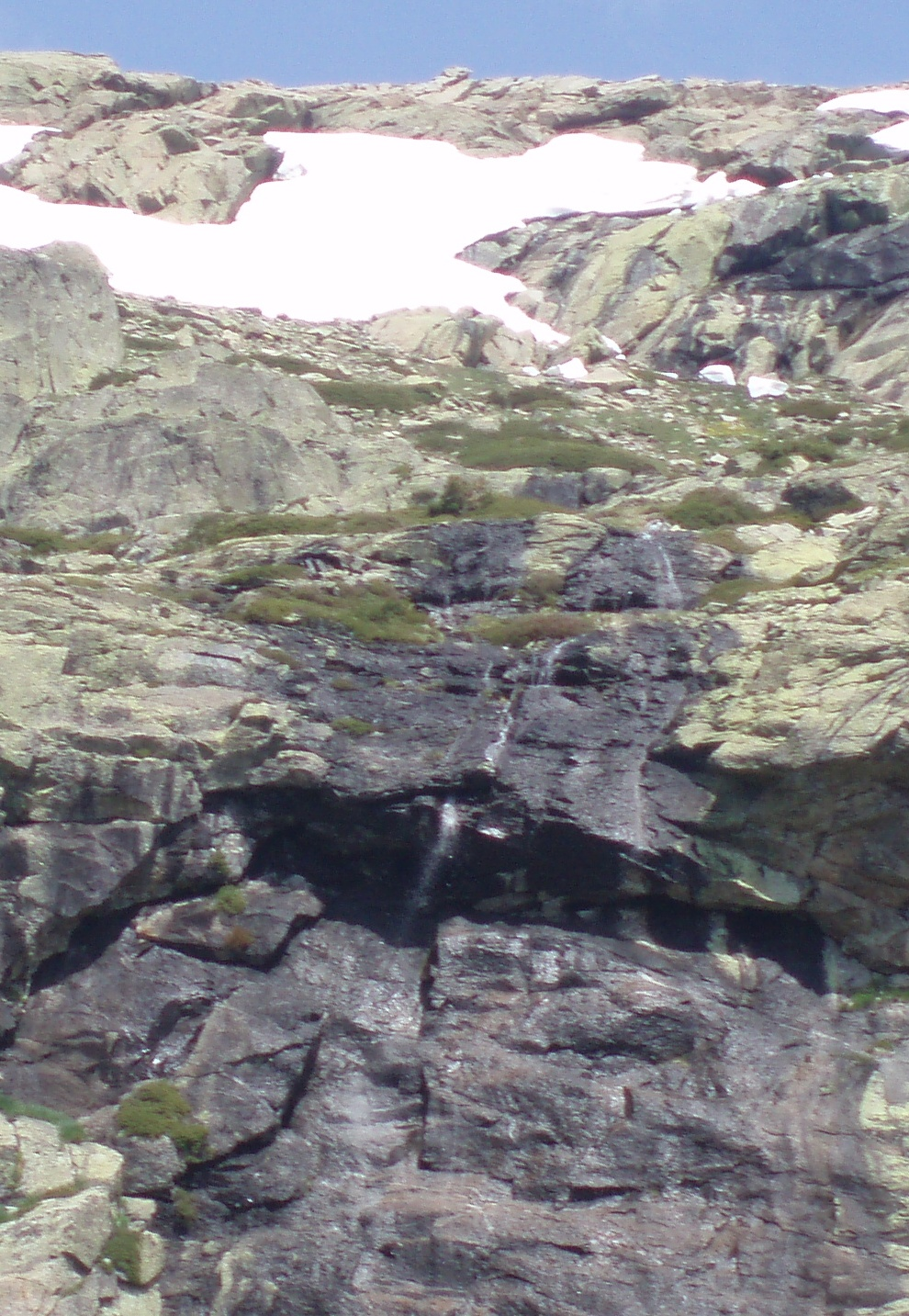
One of the small waterfalls that form on the walls of the Peñalara cirque during the thaw in June.

=== Northwest sector ===
The northwest sector is within a cornice of peaks with a "C" shape oriented to the east. To the north it is bounded by the Peñalara Peak (2430 m), the highest in the Sierra de Guadarrama, and the peak of Hermana Mayor (2285 m) is in the extreme southwest. These two mountains are separated by approximately 1200 meters and between them there is a pass of 2264 meters altitude located in the western part of the sector and is the lowest point of this cornice of peaks.

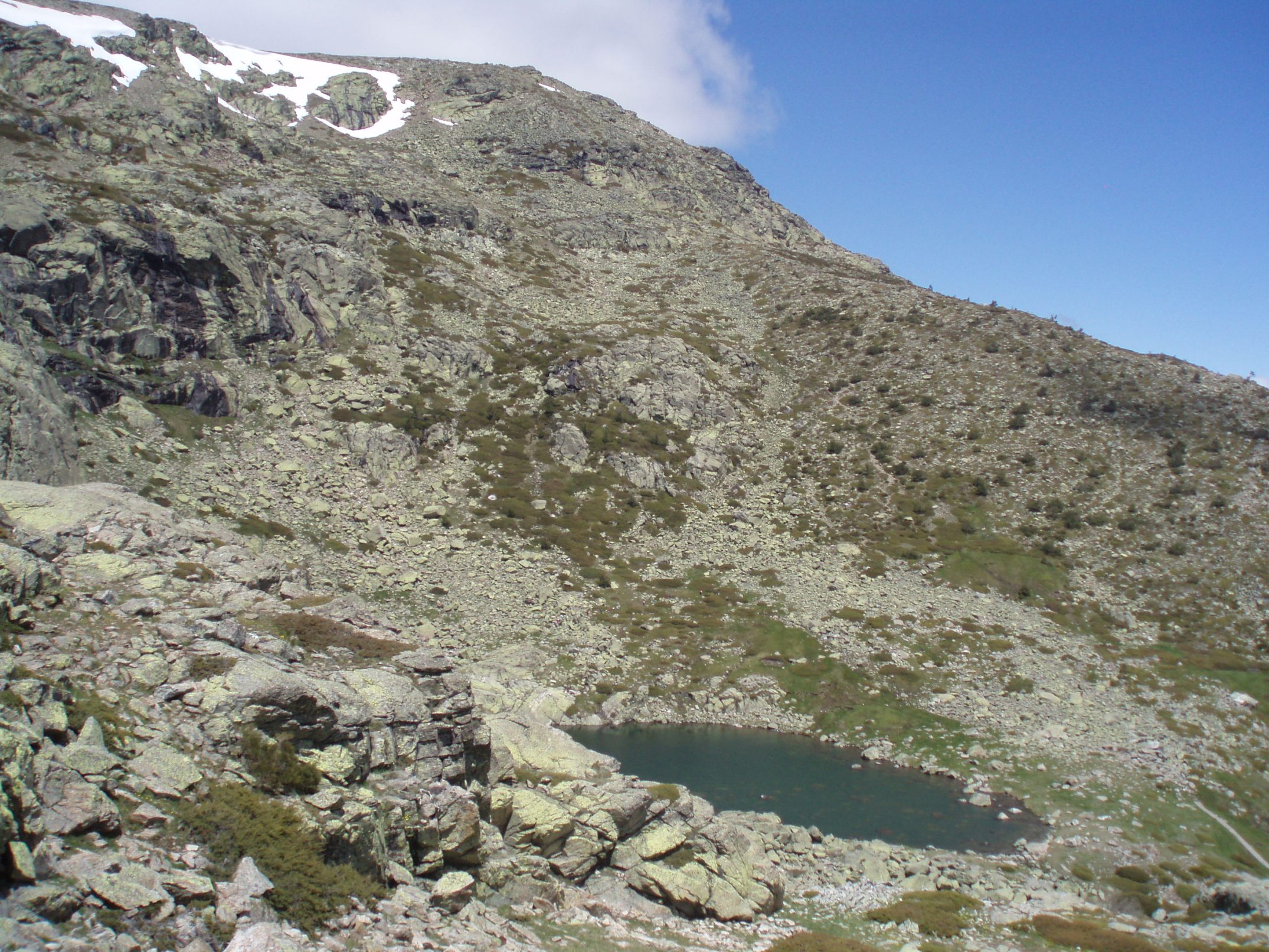
Peak and Laguna Grande de Peñalara.

To the north the sector is limited by a moraine oriented from northwest to southeast that measures about 800 meters, and to the south the same happens with another moraine oriented from west to east, which measures just over 500 meters, begins at the top of the Hermana Mayor and separates this sector from the one located to the southwest. This last moraine connects, at its eastern end, with a third one that is oriented southwest to northeast and approaches the northern moraine at the eastern end of the sector, leaving a small hollow through which the Laguna Grande de Peñalara stream flows down.

=== Southwest sector ===
The second sector of the cirque, less excavated than the first, is located in the southwest and is also known as "Circo de Dos Hermanas". To the north it limits with the dividing moraine of the two sectors and to the west is the line of summits of the two peaks of Dos Hermanas, being the Hermana Mayor in the northwest and the Hermana Menor in the west. The south and east of the cirque is delimited by a moraine that descends from the peak of the Hermana Menor and describes an "L", allowing the waters of this sector, which form streams with a temporary course, to drain towards the northeast so that they flow into the Laguna Grande stream. The base of this sector has a higher elevation than the northwest.

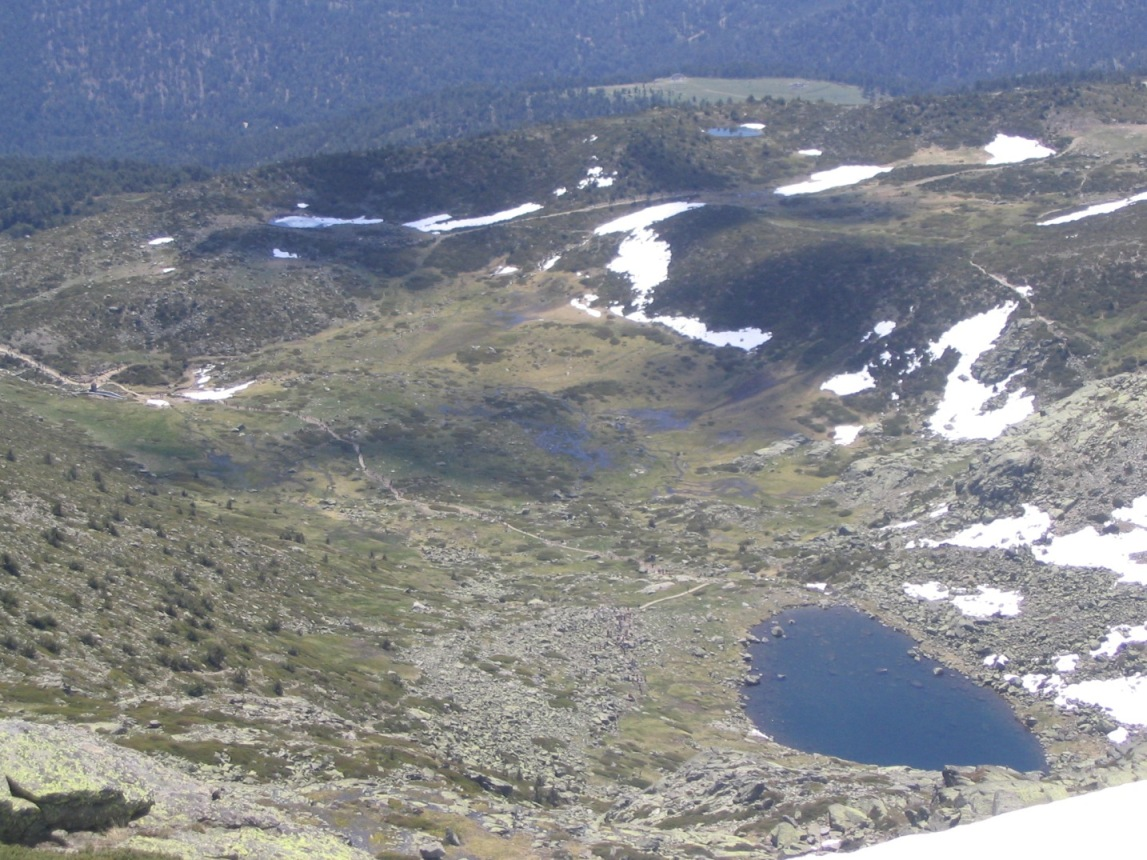
Background of the northwest sector of the cirque seen from the cornice of peaks of the Peñalara massif. The Laguna Grande de Peñalara can be seen in the lower right corner.

== Geology ==
This cirque was created by glacier action during the Quaternary, approximately 1.8 million years ago, and the most abundant type of surface rock in this area is granite, which is also found in the rest of the Sierra de Guadarrama. Glacier expansion led to the creation of several moraines that are visible today.

The two glacier lakes, which are of different sizes, are separated by a rocky outcrop on which the Zabala Refuge is located, and which continues in the southern moraine that marks the boundary between the two sectors. The sector of the Laguna Grande de Peñalara, to the northwest, is more excavated, the lake is deeper, indicating greater ice thickness and erosive capacity. The other sector, to the southwest of the lagoon, has its bottom at a higher elevation, indicating less development. The complex is closed to the east by a wide moraine arch, formed in the last glacier maximum, whose right moraine, the one located to the south and east, shows greater development, including several smaller arches, than the one corresponding to the left or north.

== Hydrography ==
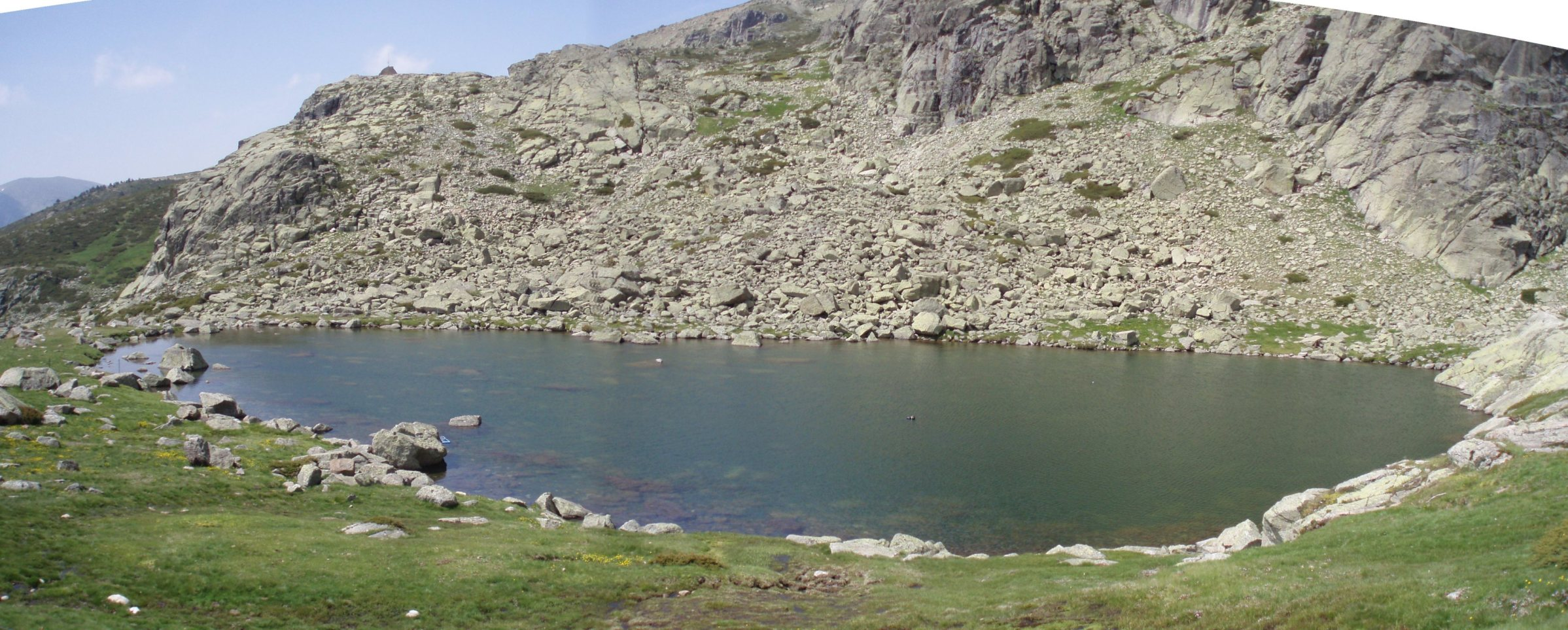
Laguna Grande de Peñalara, located in the center of the northwest sector of the cirque.

At the bottom of the northwest sector is the Laguna Grande de Peñalara, the largest in the Peñalara Natural Park, and on the walls of the cirque can be found waterfalls during the thaw of the snowfields located on the cornice of peaks. From this lagoon, which enjoys a maximum level of environmental protection, flows the "Arroyo de la Laguna Grande de Peñalara", which descends to the southeast to flow into the Lozoya River.

The streams that run through the cirque, as they pass through the areas with less slope, form several ponds and wetlands during the rainiest seasons of the year, giving rise to aquatic ecosystems. At the eastern and southeastern end of the cirque there are two glacier lagoons whose existence is temporary because they dry up in the driest summers. One of them is the Laguna Chica de Peñalara, located in the southeastern end of the northeastern sector.

== Environment ==
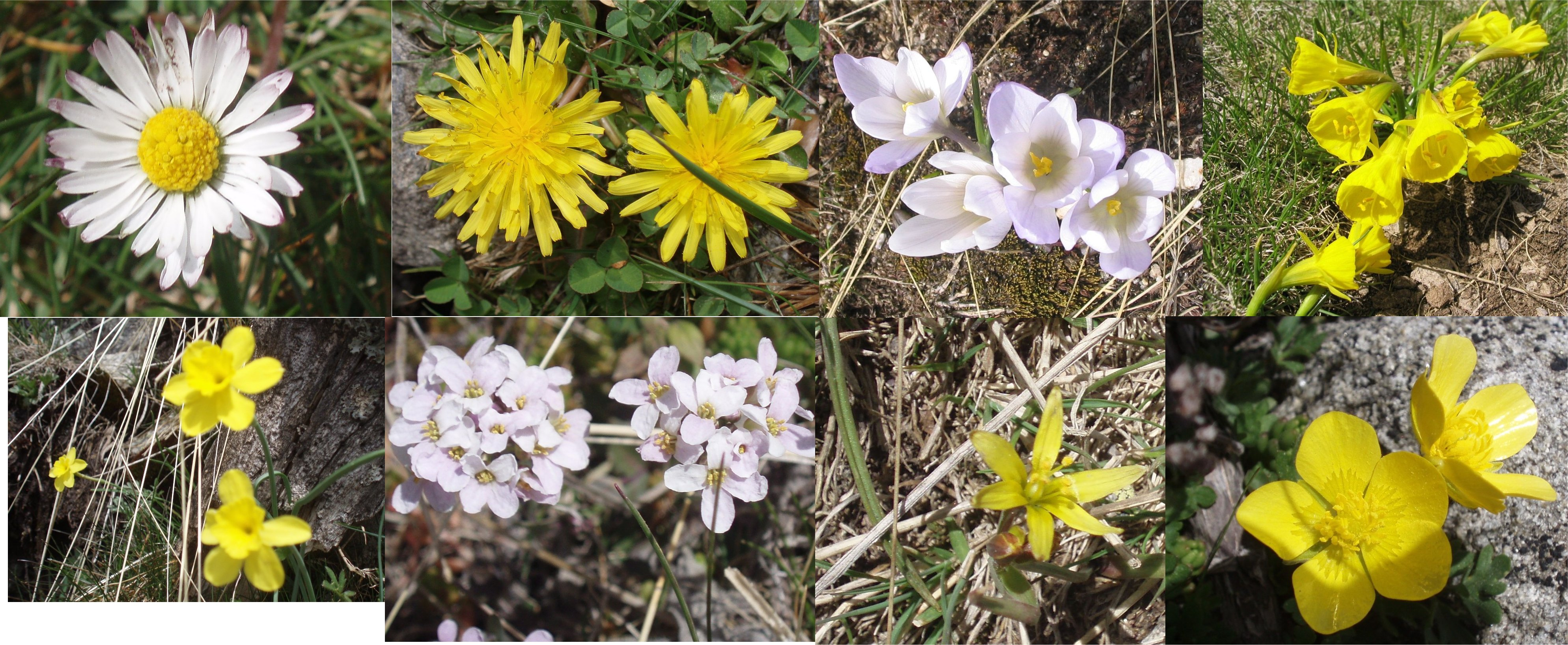
Wildflowers appearing in spring at the bottom of the cirque. Of the two flowers in the upper right corner, the white flower is a Crocus and the yellow one is a Narcissus.

The flora that inhabits the cirque is mainly composed of annual plants, which means that they are herbaceous species. However, there are some high mountain matorral shrubs that can be found at the bottom of the cirque, such as piorno, retama and juniper. The arboreal species are very scarce due to the climatic and geological conditions, which make the place very cold and windy. There are only a few scattered pinus sylvestris in the eastern and northern areas.

The fauna is composed of small animals, amphibians that live in the lagoons and large birds of prey. Ten species of amphibians have been recorded, of which seven are included in the National Catalogue of Threatened Species, and 97 species of birds, of which 79 are protected. Some species that can be found are the common salamander, imperial eagle, black vulture, European snow vole, common wall lizard, mountain lizard, Parnassius apolo butterfly, Plebicula ni ecensis and Hyphoraia dejeani.

The climate in the circus is alpine, characterized by cold temperatures throughout the year and changing in different seasons, and abundant precipitation, which is snow from mid-November to late April. The average annual precipitation ranges between 1500 and 2500 mm; they are scarcer during the summer and abundant in autumn and spring. The ground generally remains covered with snow throughout the winter and the first half of spring, and the surface of the lagoons remains frozen during the coldest months. The average temperature is between 6 and 7 °C, reaching maximums in summer of 22 °C and minimums in winter of −14 °C. The wind regime is quite intense because it is located near the cornice of peaks, which prevents the proliferation of forests.

== Tourism and sports ==
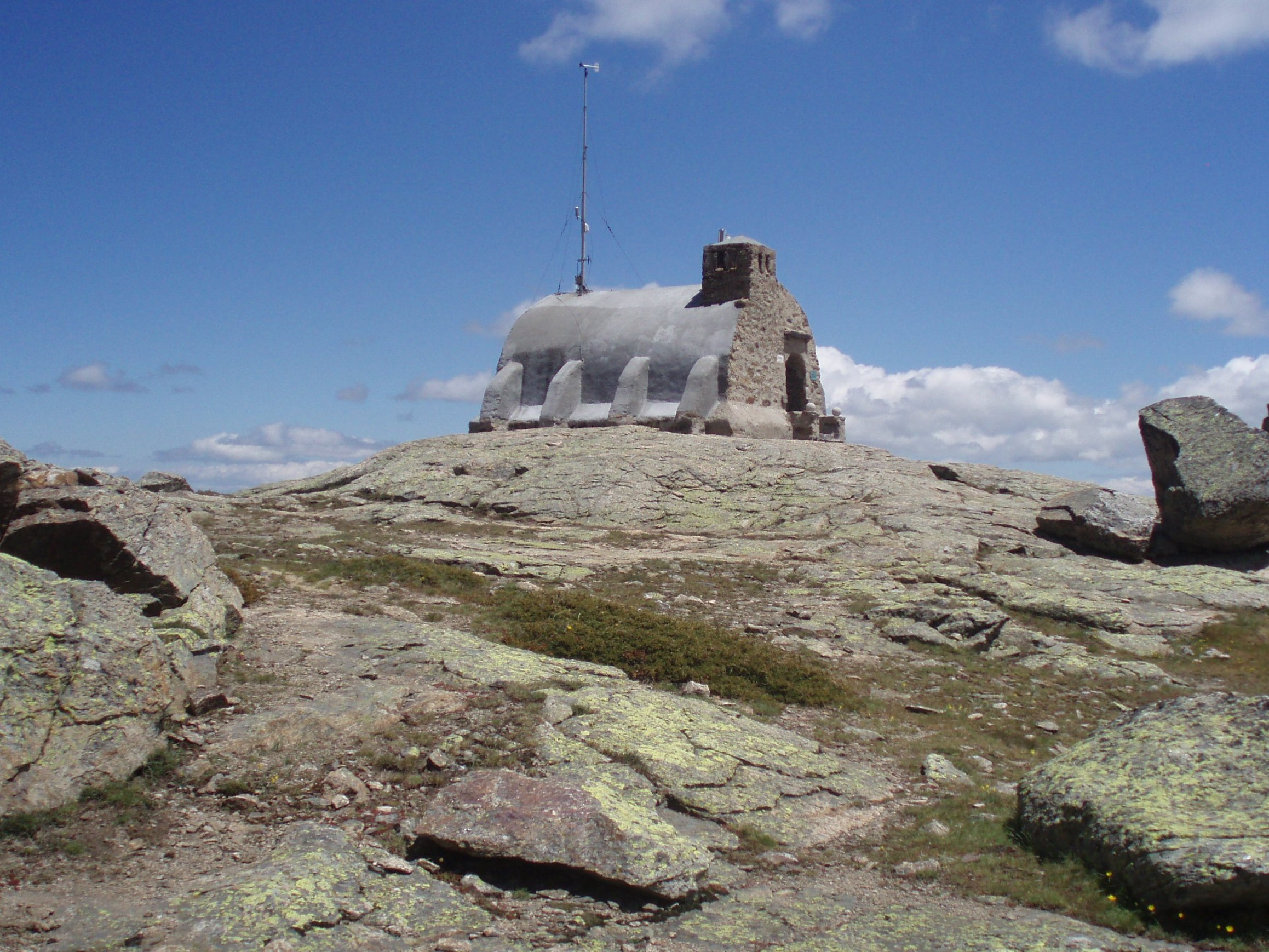
Zabala Refuge

The Peñalara cirque is the most visited place in the Peñalara Natural Park because of its easy access from Puerto de Cotos (1830 m), located 1.5 km to the south, and because it is one of the most striking landscapes in the nature reserve. This site received more than 133,000 visitors in 2006. The most popular sports in the area are hiking and climbing. During the winter months it is also possible to practice cross-country skiing on some of the trails of the dismantled Valcotos ski resort.

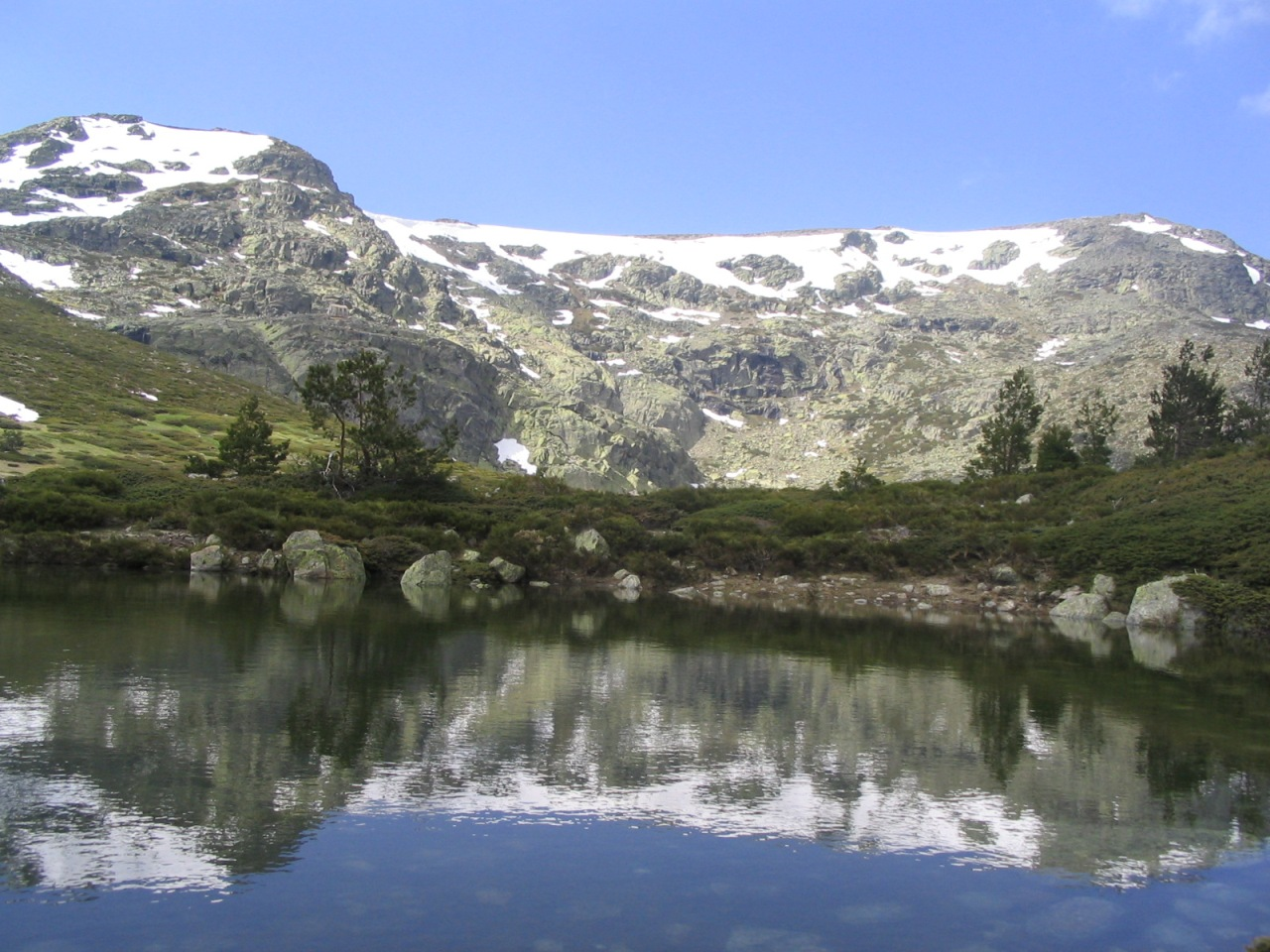
Northwest sector of the cirque and a temporary lagoon in the southwest sector.

Hiking is one of the most practiced sports thanks to the fact that there are a series of paths and trails that run through the cirque. The busiest and most visited of them is the one that leaves the Puerto de Cotos and leads to the Laguna Grande de Peñalara, passing very close to the Laguna Chica. This path has a very low level of difficulty, is signposted and is done in an hour and a quarter, which makes the influx of people is abundant throughout the year. This is one of the reasons why there are areas of the cirque that enjoy a maximum level of environmental protection within the Peñalara Natural Park. From this road, as it passes through the northeast end of the cirque, there is a path that ascends northwest along the northern moraine and leads to the Laguna de los Pájaros. From the main road there is another trail that heads south and leads to the Laguna Chica of Peñalara and, later, to the first section of the ascent path to the peak of Peñalara, which is located on the southern edge of the glacier cirque. There is a third trail, less marked than the previous ones, which directly connects the ascent path to the peak of Peñalara with the Laguna Grande de Peñalara, passing through the Zabala Refuge. The description of a complete circular route to Peñalara and the GPS track can be found on Wikiloc, which also includes references to numerous information, photos and a video that will help the hiker.

Climbing is a very popular sport in the area. There are numerous rock walls in the western part of the circus where it is possible to practice this sport and it represents the cradle of many climbers from Madrid. All these walls are in the northeast sector and there are about 150 climbing routes on them, all of which have been widely used since the beginning of the 20th century. The climbing sectors are the following: Dos Hermanas, Cosaco, Placas Duro, Teresa, Trapecio and Zabala. When winter conditions permit, ice climbing can also be practiced on many of these routes.

== Panoramic views ==
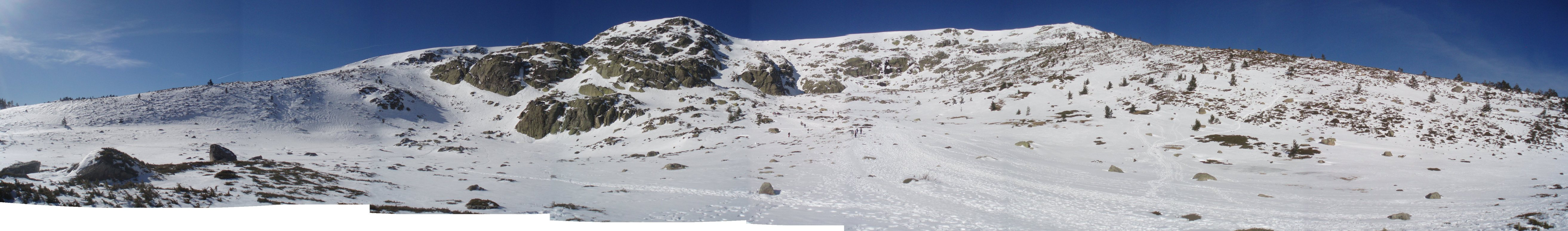
Panoramic view of the Peñalara cirque in winter. On the left of the image is the peak of Hermana Menor, in the center is the peak of Hermana Mayor and on the right is the Peñalara Peak. The Hermana Mayor peak delimits the two sectors into which the cirque is divided.

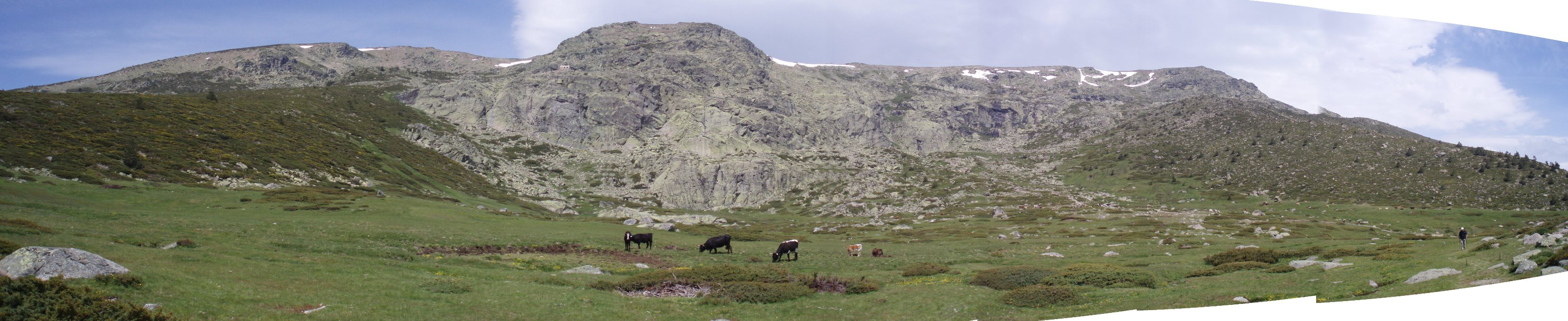
Panoramic view of the Peñalara cirque. On the left of the image is the peak of Hermana Menor, in the center is the peak of Hermana Mayor and on the right is the peak of Peñalara. The Hermana Mayor peak delimits the two sectors into which the cirque is divided. At both ends of the image we can see the two moraines that limit the northwest sector.

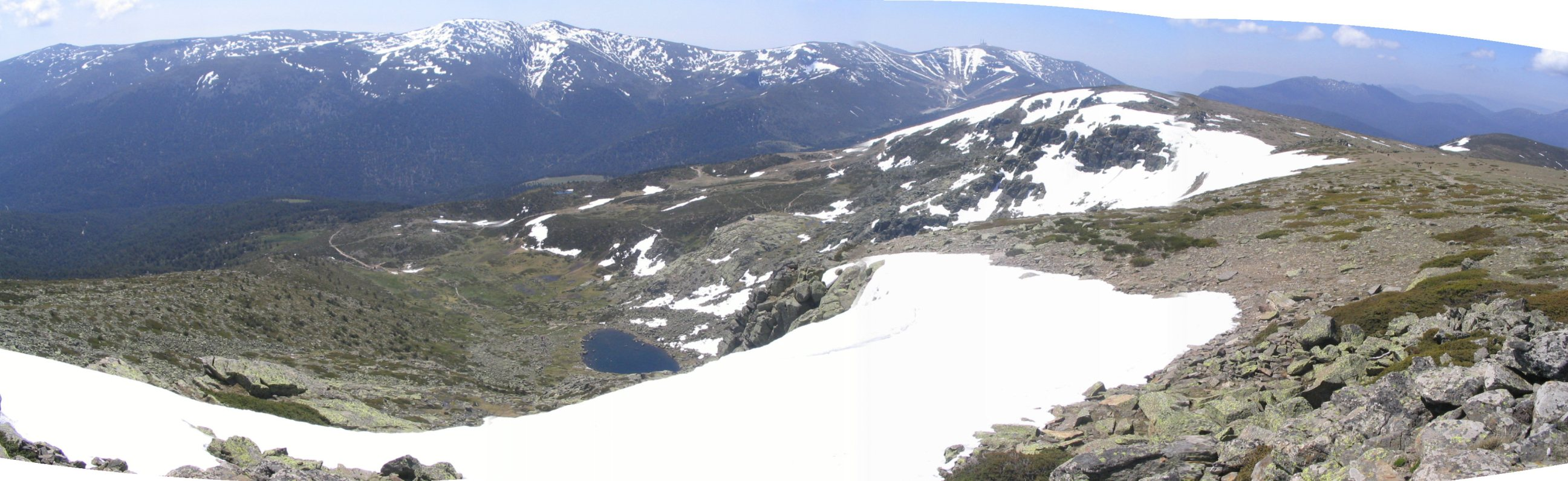
Panoramic view of the Peñalara cirque from the cornice of peaks of the Peñalara massif. In the image you can see the Laguna Grande de Peñalara, to the right the southwest sector and in the background the mountainous alignment of Cuerda Larga.

== See also ==
- Cirque glacier
- Peñalara Natural Park
- Peñalara

== Bibliography ==
- Blázquez Díaz, Alicia; Heras Hernández, Francisco; de Mingo-Sancho, Gloria; Sintes Zamanillo, María; Barbadillo Salgado, Francisco Javier (1996). Valle Alto del Lozoya (in Spanish). Libros de la Catarata. ISBN 84-8198-154-0.
- Fidalgo García, Pablo; Martín Espinosa, Agustín (2005). Atlas Estadístico de la Comunidad de Madrid 2005 (in Spanish). Instituto de Estadística de la Comunidad de Madrid. ISBN 84-451-2786-1.
- Pliego Vega, Domingo (2002). Excursiones por el Parque Natural de Peñalara. Ediciones Desnivel. ISBN 84-95760-59-2.
- AA, VV. (2003). Peñalara. Revista ilustrada de alpinismo (in Spanish). Vol. II (1st ed.). Madrid: Ediciones Desnivel. ISBN 84-451-2443-9.
