= Guadarrama National Park =

National park in Spain

Sierra de Guadarrama National Park
- IUCN category II (national park)
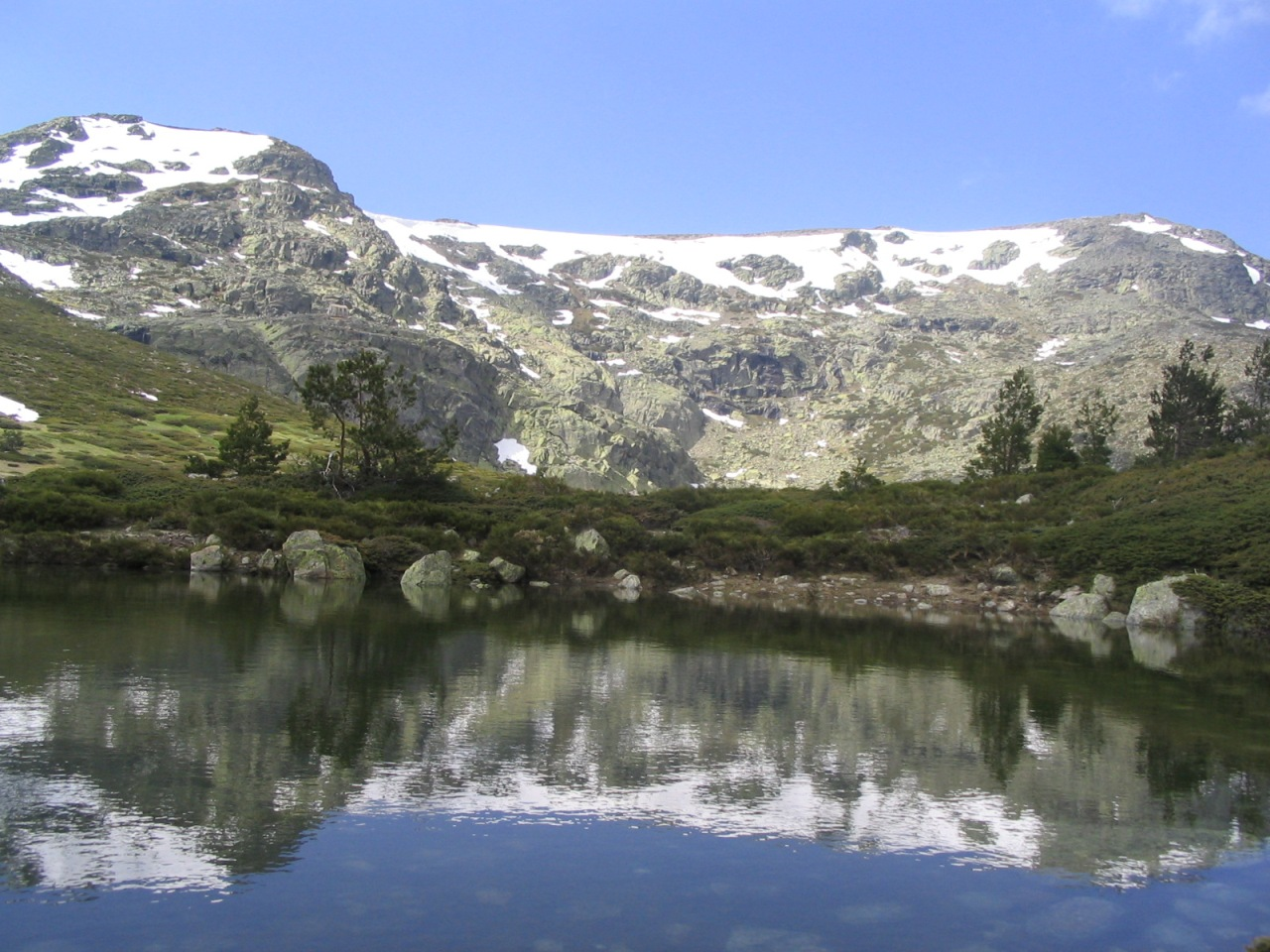
- Peñalara Peak and Peñalara glacial lagoon
- Location of Guadarrama
- Location: Sierra de Guadarrama (Castile and León and Community of Madrid, Spain)
- Coordinates: 40°47′N 3°59′W
- Area: 339.60 km^{2} (131.12 sq mi)
- Established: June 26, 2013
- Governing body: Spanish Ministry of Environment.

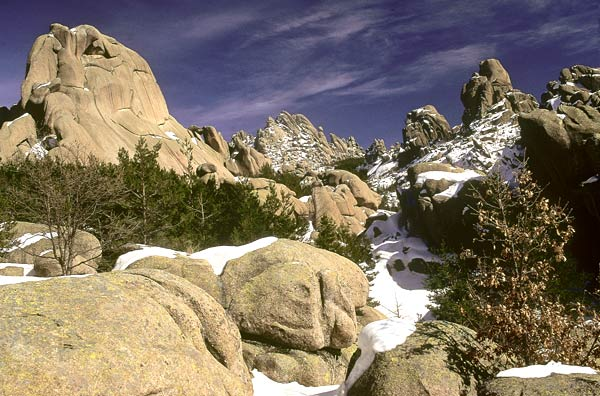
Granite rocks in the national park.

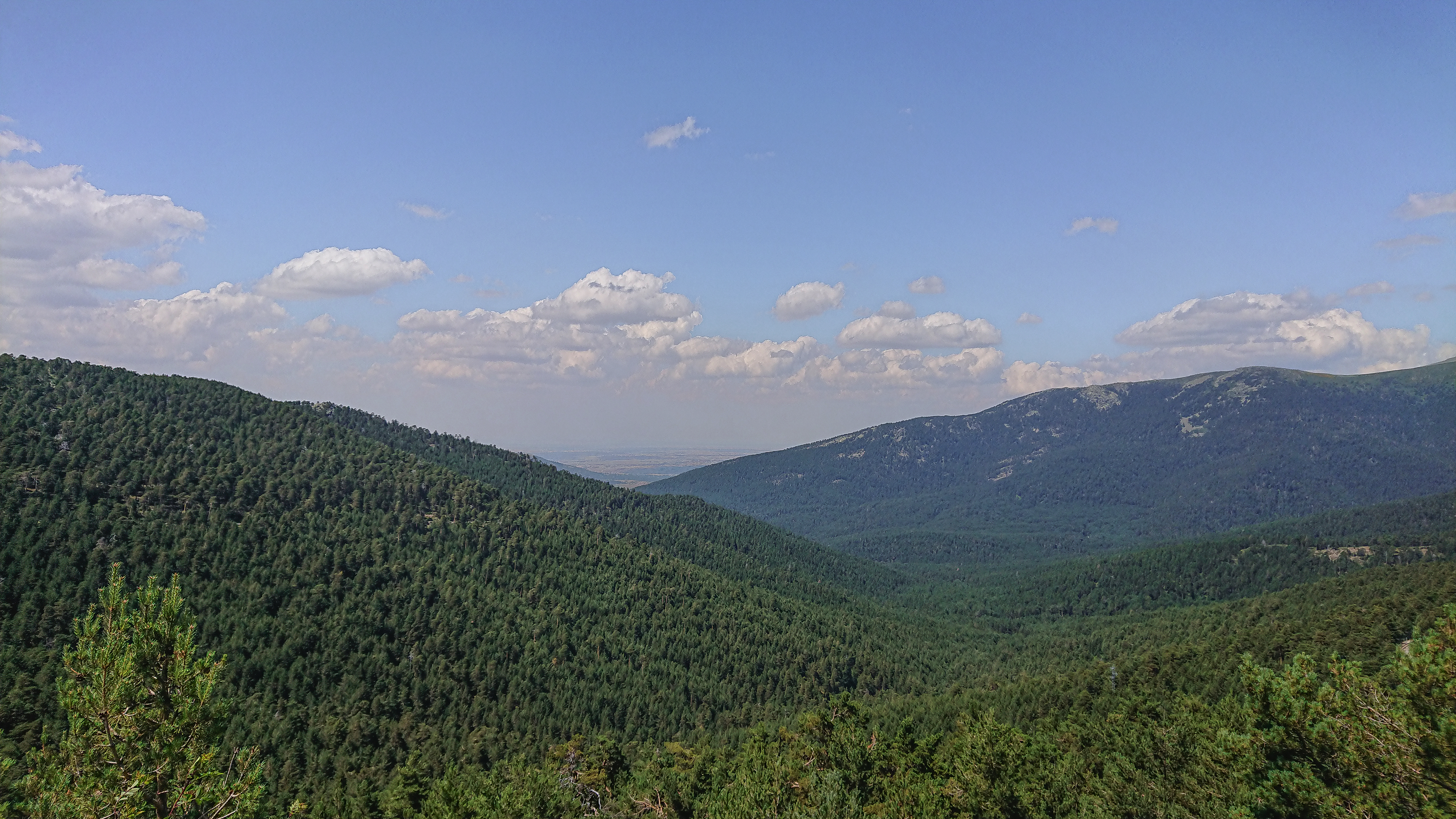
Valsaín Mounts, Guadarrama National Park

Sierra de Guadarrama National Park (in Spanish: Parque Nacional de la Sierra de Guadarrama) is a national park in Spain, covering nearly 34,000 hectares, the fifth largest in Spain's national parks system. The Guadarrama mountain range (Sistema Central) contains some ecologically valuable areas, located in the Community of Madrid and Castile and León (provinces of Segovia and Ávila). The law that regulates the recently approved national park was published in the BOE on June 26, 2013.

== Ecology ==
The park aims to protect the eleven different ecosystems present in the Guadarrama mountains, including the only Iberian examples of "high Mediterranean mountain". Altogether there are more than 1,280 different species in the zone declared a national park, of which 13 are in danger of extinction, more than 1,500 native plants and 30 different types of vegetation. The species of animals in the mountains represent 45% of the total fauna of Spain and 18% of European fauna. The vegetation features the Scots pine, the oak, the juniper, the oak and piorno and many other species. As regards fauna, there are many mammals such as deer (red, roe and fallow), wild boar, wild goats, badgers, several mustelidaes, wild cats, foxes, hares, etc.; many species of waterfowl in the reservoirs, and great raptors like the Spanish imperial eagle or the Eurasian black vulture. Recently, a pack of wolves was discovered in the park after a 70-year absence in the region.

== History of attempts to designate the park ==
The Peñalara Mountain climbing society proposed in the 1920s that the Guadarrama mountain range (in Spanish: Sierra de Guadarrama) should be declared a national park. This project had to be put on hold until the beginning of the 21st century, when the Community of Madrid revived the project. In the absence of a designated national park, some areas of the sierra were given alternative protection:

- Since 1984 El Escorial has been protected as a World Heritage Site (The Monastery of San Lorenzo de El Escorial and Natural Surroundings).
- There is a natural park, the Peñalara Natural Park, designated in 1990. The natural park includes wetland areas which are important for amphibians, and in 2006 these were designated a Ramsar site, Humedales del Macizo de Peñalar. The natural park is within the boundaries of a Special Protection Area for birdlife.
- There is a regional park (Parque Regional de la Cuenca Alta del Manzanares), which was created in the 1980s. The area covered by the regional park, the upper Manzanares River basin, was designated in 1992 as a biosphere reserve (Cuenca Alta del Río Manzanares).

As proposed at the beginning of the 21st century, the park would have been the fourth largest in Spain. In 2006, it appeared that the designation of the national park was imminent. A plan for the part of the national park falling within the boundaries of the Community of Madrid was approved in November 2006.

=== Planning in Castile and León ===
The autonomous community of Castile and León agreed in principle to the inclusion of part of its territory in the proposed national park but delays in creating the corresponding plan made it appear in early 2008 that the project was being put aside. It was reported in the press that as Castile and León had been suffering from population loss, the regional government was reluctant to restrict development in an area which was attractive to developers because of its proximity to the Spanish capital. However, the arrest of population decline was not the official explanation for lack of progress with the park (although the regional government cited population decline as a reason for supporting development on ecologically valuable sites elsewhere in the autonomous community, such as San Glorio). The reason given publicly for the lack of progress with the national park was a desire to protect the interests of "traditional" uses of the land, including commercial forestry which is prohibited in Spanish national parks. There were indications that Castile and León would prefer its side of the sierra to be given a lower level of protection than implied by national park status (e.g. a natural park, or "regional park"). However, in 2009 Castile and León indicated it would approve a plan for the national park in 2010, albeit a scaled-down version, and this timetable was adhered to. The Community of Madrid made similar proposals for a scaled-down park (see below).

=== Planning in the Community of Madrid ===
In late 2008 the Community of Madrid proposed to reduce the size of the Madrid portion of the national park, citing the interests of "traditional" uses of the land which might be restricted by planning regulations. The President of the Community, Esperanza Aguirre, argued that traditional uses were the best conservation strategy, and she specified the keeping of livestock, mountaineering and forestry as being traditional in the sierra. Aguirre subsequently clarified that she considered hunting and fishing as being in the same category.

Aguirre suggested that the area to be protected was not being reduced in size, but rather the level of protection was to be reduced outside a core area. The area of the national park would be largely confined to the summits. Lower down the slopes there would be plenty of opportunities to build houses in the sierra. More detailed proposals were produced in 2009 and received a positive response from the municipios affected, which welcomed the scope for increased urbanisation.

== See also ==
- List of national parks of Spain
- Sierra de Guadarrama
- Peñalara Natural Park
- Peñalara
- La Pedriza
- Puerto de Cotos
