= Peñalara Natural Park =

Protected area in Spain

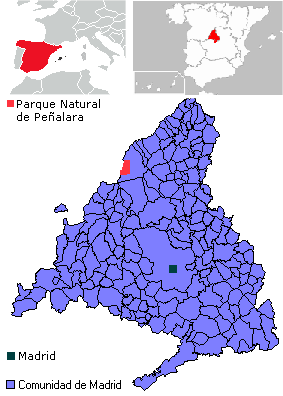
- Map of Peñalara Natural Park.
- Interactive map of Peñalara Natural Park
- Location: Community of Madrid (Spain)
- Nearest town: Rascafría
- Coordinates: 40°51′25″N 3°57′20″W
- Area: 7.68 km^{2} (2.97 sq mi)
- Established: 15 June 1990
- Visitors: 133,000 (in 2006)
- Governing body: Community of Madrid
- Website: web.archive.org/web/20071014005309/http://parquesnaturales.consumer.es/documentos/madrid/cumbre_penalara/index.php

Ramsar Wetland
- Official name: Humedales del Macizo de Peñalara
- Designated: 19 February 2007
- Reference no.: 1673

The Peñalara Natural Park (Spanish: Parque Natural de la Cumbre, Circo y Lagunas de Peñalara) is a natural park of 7.68 km^{2} in the northwest of the Community of Madrid, Spain. It was designated in June 1990. The park is situated in the central zone of the Sierra de Guadarrama (part of the mountainous axis called the Central System). Since 2013, the Sierra de Guadarrama has also been protected by a national park designation.

The reserve includes Peñalara, the highest peak of the mountain system, and an area to the south-east of the peak in Rascafría district. The zones of lowest altitude hold white pine forests and grasslands. Bushes grow higher up in the mountains, which are predominantly composed of alpine meadows and rocky areas. The park is home to the black vulture and the Spanish imperial eagle, as well as many small mammals and amphibians.

The park is accessible from Puerto de Cotos, the region's center of tourism. Especially popular on the holidays, the reserve provides a venue for hiking, mountain climbing, and skiing.

== Geography ==
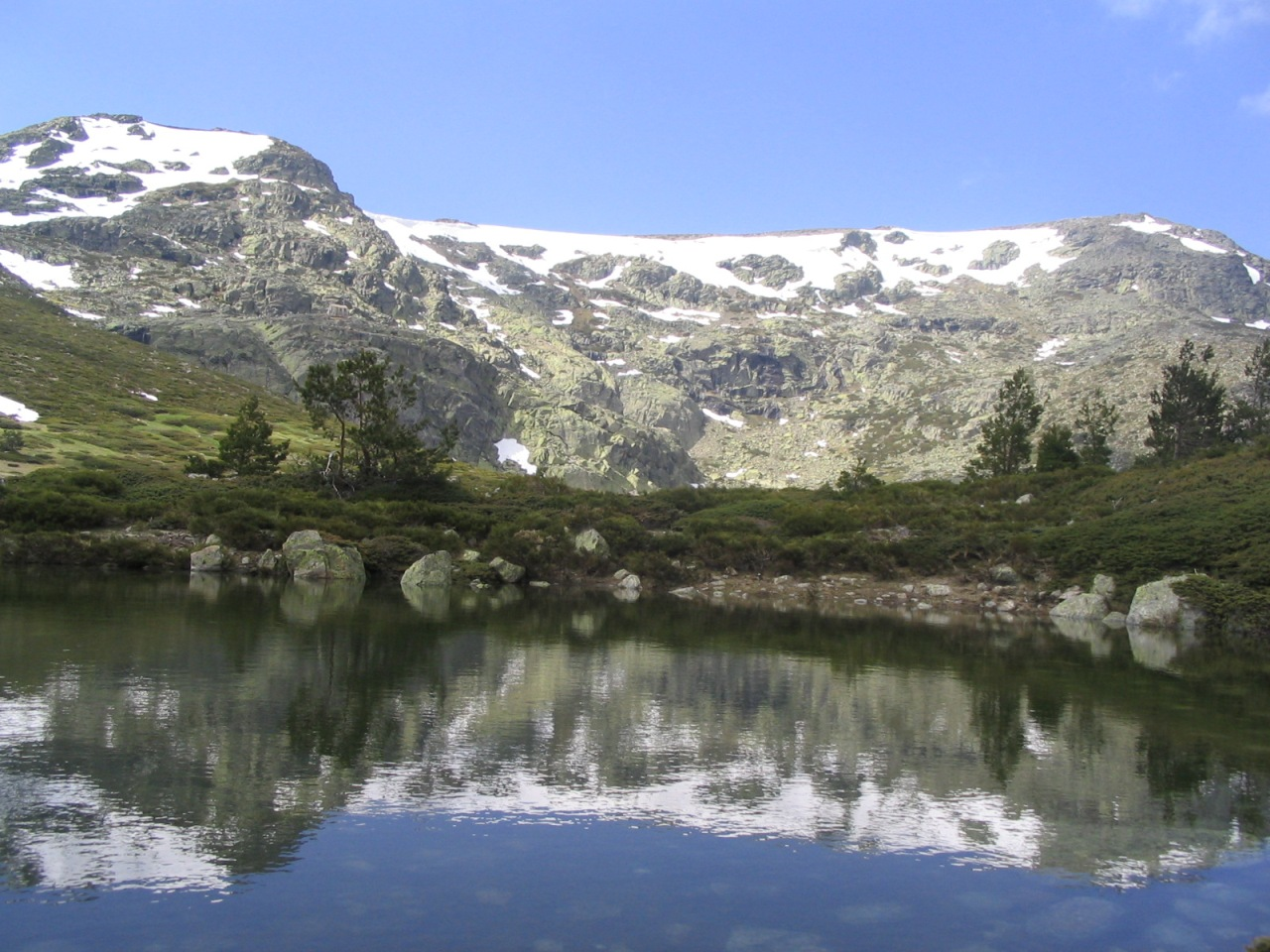
Peak of Two Sisters Mountain, cirque and peak of Peñalara reflected in a glacial lake.

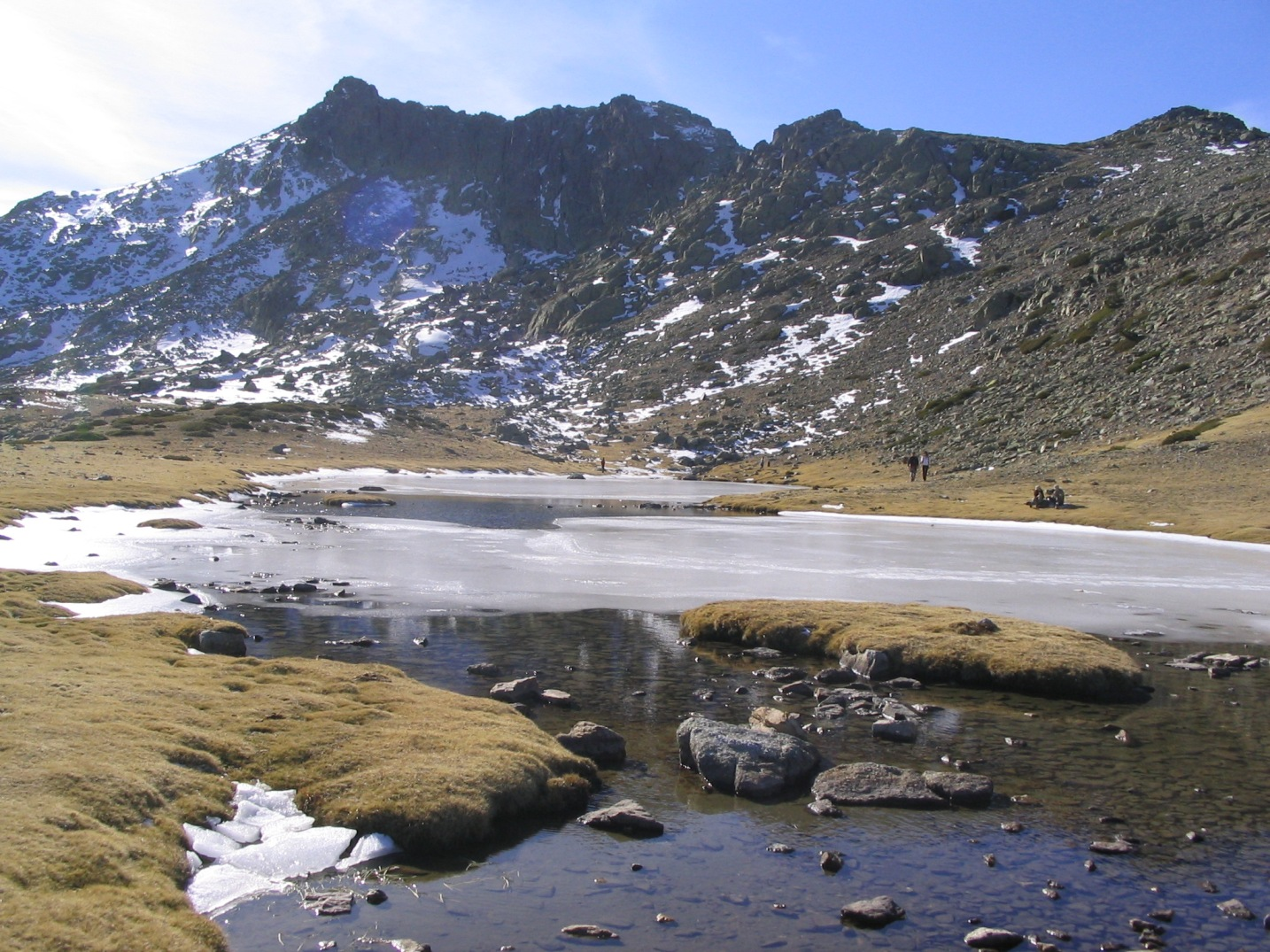
Bird Lake and the Cliff of Carnations and Bird Cliff behind. The Cliff of Carnations is the second-highest peak in the Sierra de Guadarrama.

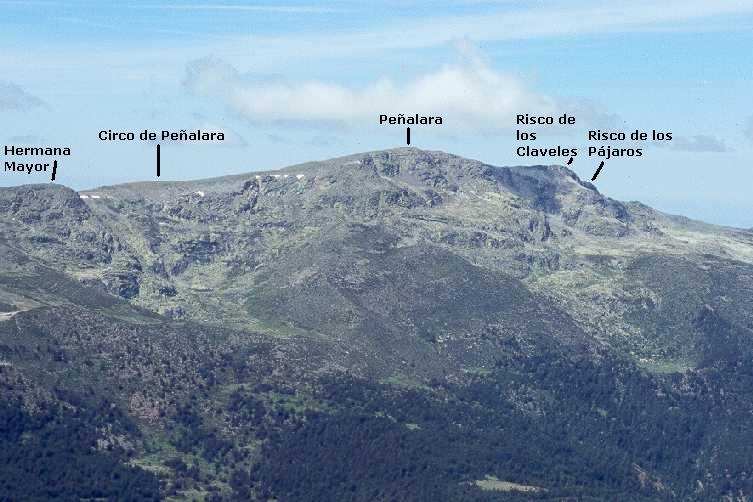
Overlook of Peñalara Nature Reserve, taken in the summer from the peak of the Horseshoe Skulls. Visible are Peñalara's moraines and the cirque of Pepe Hernando.

Peñalara Nature Reserve is located in the zone of highest elevation on the southeastern slope of Peñalara Peak, with its 2.428 kilometers the highest in the Sierra de Guadarrama, in the high part of Lozoya Valley, and in the district of Rascafría. It covers a rough rectangle of 7.68 square kilometers. The coordinates of the reserve's central zone are 40° 50′ N 3° 57′ W.

In the northern zone are two projecting cliffs difficult to reach; the northernmost is Bird Cliff, with a height of 2.334 kilometers. Close by and to the south is the Cliff of Carnations, which being 2.388 kilometers above sea level is the second-highest peak in the Sierra de Guadarrama. No other elevations are so prominent. To the south is Peñalara peak, distinguished by a geodesic vertex of the first order that indicates its height of 2.285 kilometers. The 2.271 km Two Sisters Mountain marks the southeastern limit of the park. Besides these peaks, other highlights include Cheese Boulder, a 2.032 km peak to the southeast of the Younger Sister, midway between Puerto de Cotos, and the cirque of Peñalara.

The peaks of the park, ordered from north to south, are the following:

- Bird Cliff (2.334 m)
- Cliff of Carnations (2.388 m)
- Peñalara Peak (2.428 m)
- Older Sister Mountain (2.285 m)
- Younger Sister Mountain (2.271 m)
- Cheese Boulder (2.032 m)

=== Glacial features ===
One of the most interesting elements of the reserve is the Peñalara cirque, created by a glaciar. It is located between the summit of Peñalara and the Younger Sister, on the eastern slope of both peaks. The base of the cirque has an altitude of 2 to 2.05 km, and its sides rise from this elevation to 2.2 and 2.4 km. There are also three other cirques of lesser size and importance. One of these is the cirque of Pepe Hernando, located some 500 m to the south of the Lake of Carnations. Its size is a quarter of Peñalara's, and its base rises to approximately 1.9 km. The others are the cirques of the Regajo de la Pedriza y Brezal. Each has a moraine at its lower part, a rocky zone with a relatively gentle slope that was produced by the track of an ancient glacier. Besides cirques and moraines, there exists a series of walls with elevations greater than 200 m aligned north to south, extending north and south from the principle cirque.

=== Hydrography ===
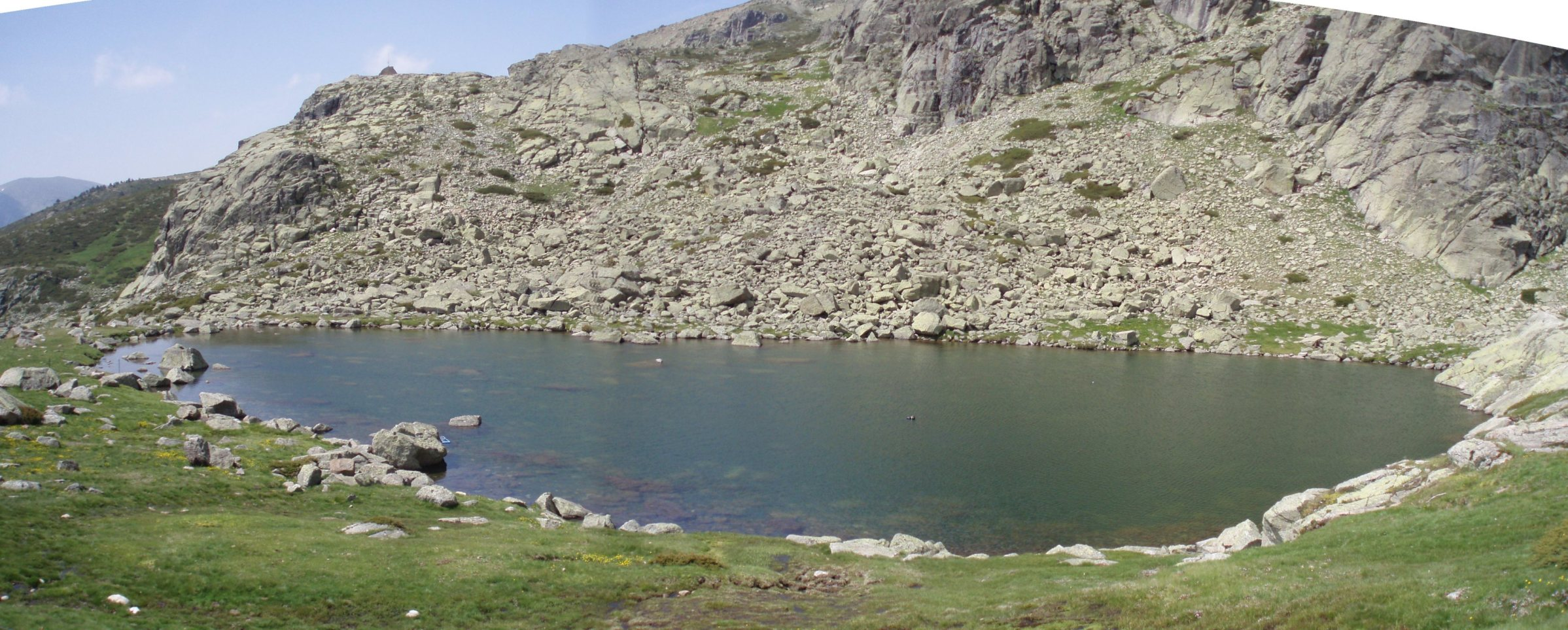
Peñalara Great Lake.

There are some twenty small glacial lakes in the park. All are located to the east of the large walls in a relatively level zone of elevation 2.2 – 2 km. One of the largest is Bird Lake to the northeast of Bird Cliff. A half kilometer to the south is the Lake of Carnations, a small lagoon between the Cliff of Carnations and the eastern slope of Peñalara Peak. In the bed of Peñalara cirque, further to the south, is the circular Peñalara Great Lake, the most extensive in the reserve. It is the most popular with visitors. Approximately .6 km to its southeast is Chica Lagoon, the most distant lake of the cirque: a small and seldom-visited lagoon that commands an impressive view of the Older Sister Mountain, the Peñalara cirque, and Peñalara Peak. All the lakes remain frozen from September until about March.

During the wet seasons (fall and spring), a series of arroyos flow from the major lakes and often form cascades, which add to the landscape's beauty. Bird Arroyo originates from Bird Lake, and the arroyo of Peñalara's lagoon originates from the Great Lake. All these streams run eastward and belong to the western region of the Lozoya River basin.

== Geology ==
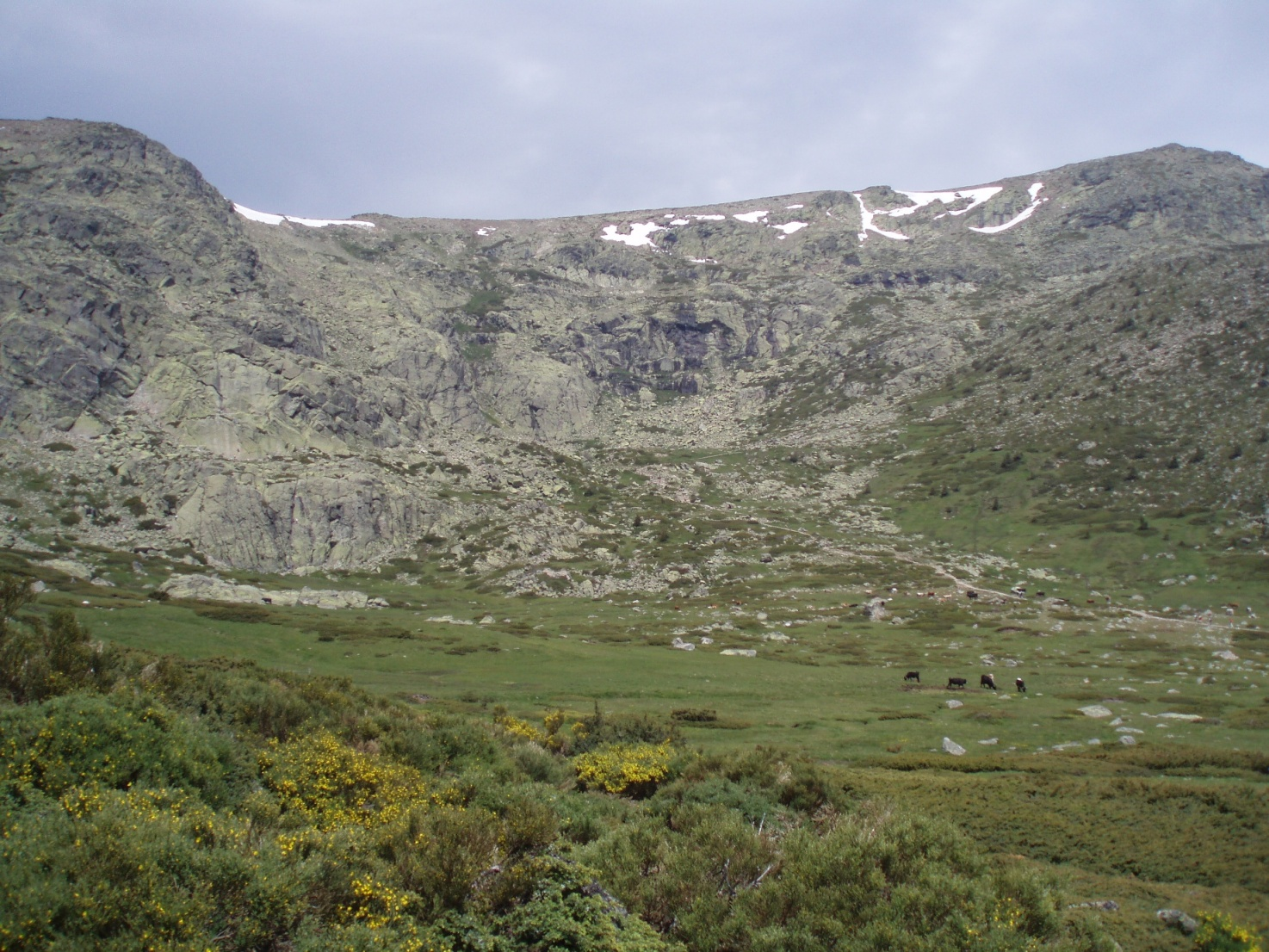
Peñalara cirque, one of the most important glacial formations in the reserve.

The high relief of the reserve is due to the collision between the tectonic plates corresponding to the North and South Subplateaus. Both form part of the Central Plateau. In the Middle Paleozoic (360 to 290 mya (unit)), an initial substrate of ancient granites and sediments began to fold and metamorphose, creating the gneisses.

During the Late Paleozoic (290 to 250 mya), those materials began to fracture. Masses of magma began rising to the surface, and in this way the granites were formed. The final phase of this era produced a general elevation of the Peñalara massif.

From the end of the Paleozoic and during the Mesozoic (250 to 66 mya), the processes of erosion began to wear down the contours of the land. In this last period occurred a monumental departure from the ocean, which left subaquatic zones exposed on the surface (prior to this, it is likely that the sierra was not more than an islet raised slightly above the sea) and formed sinks of sediment that covered the plains with sediment and would give them their later calcareous character.

In the Cenozoic (66 to 1.8 mya), the processes that raised the Peñalara massif and divided it into the blocks we find today began to work again. Erosion of the rocky massif filled the basins with sediment. Glacial action in the Quaternary (1.8 mya to present) finished shaping the Peñalara cirque and the walls of the mountainous axis. The cirques were covered by a mantle of ice up to 300 m thick. Later, the confluence of the rivers gave the final touch to the landscape. The dominant rock in the park is granite, which is very hard and erosion-resistant.

== Flora and fauna ==
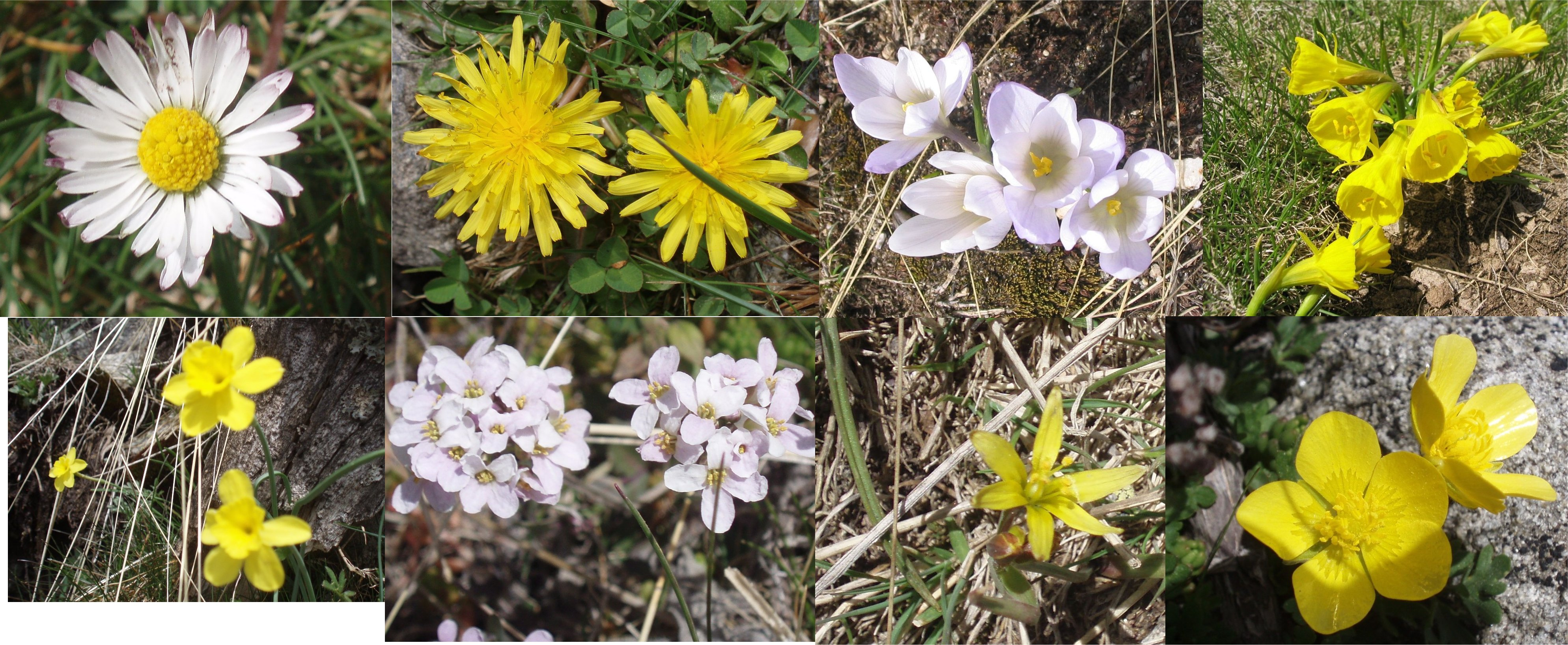
Wildflowers in the nature reserve. They bloom in spring and summer. The white flower is a crocus and the yellow a narcissus.

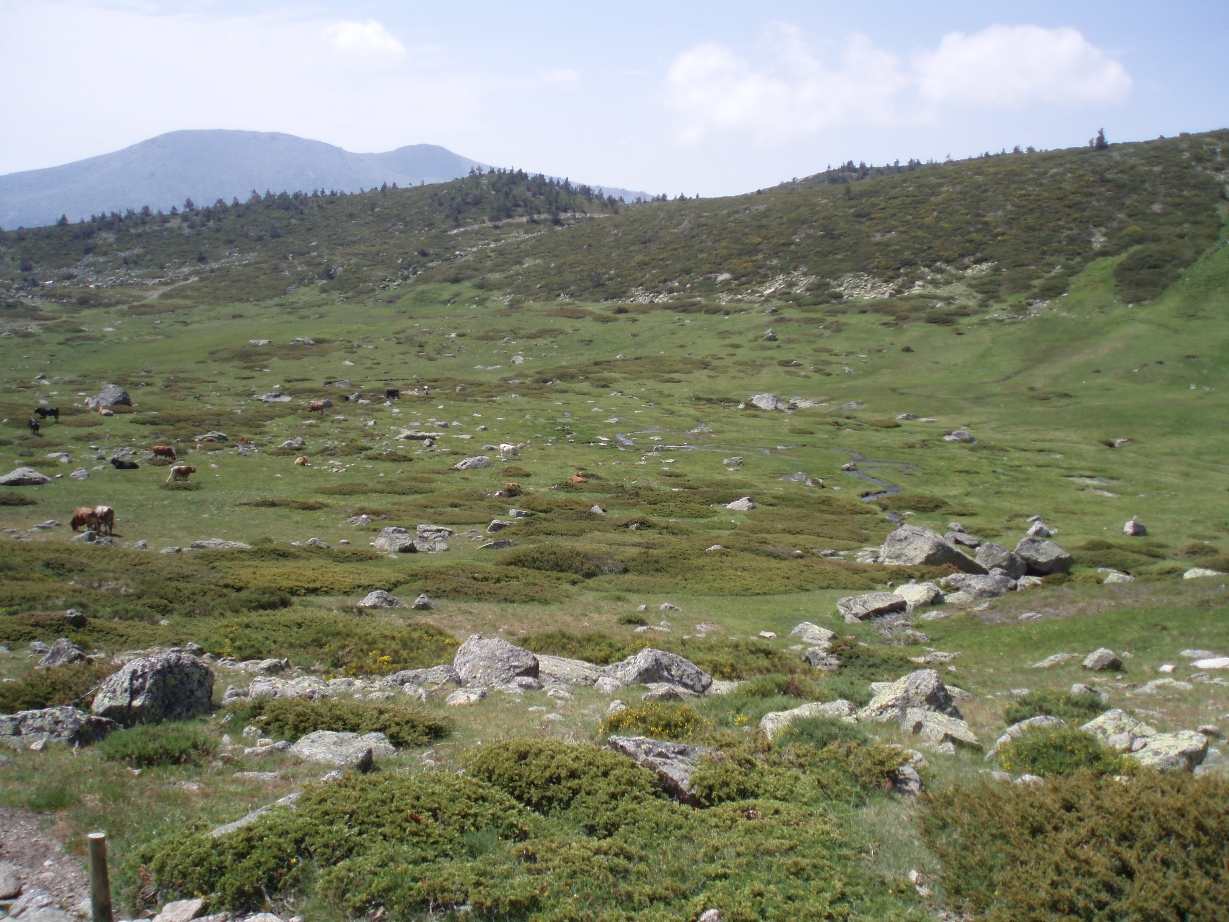
Meadow at the edges of Peñalara cirque. Visible in the image are matorral at high and white pines at low altitudes.

The flora and fauna of Peñalara Natural Reserve are exclusively in the mountains. The cold climate, the strong wind, and the abundant snow during most of the year are the reasons why forests only grow at low altitudes and the fauna is composed of small animals.

=== Flora ===
The dominant vegetation is a matorral of broom and jabino, which alternates with meadows of Nardus stricta in wetter areas like the cirque basins. Less plentiful but of equal interest are the swamp blueberries of the Peñalara plains. Other, less common types of matorral are composed of true heath and juniper. Under the elevation 2 km grow tight-knitted forests of white pine. These are the only species of tree in the reserve. Thickets of fern grow in the forests, though not abundantly. Several brightly colored flowers grow high in the mountains in spring and simmer. The reserve contains 343 species of vascular plants and 200 species of lichen. About half the taxa of vascular plants are considered rare, endemic, or threatened. Of those, fifty have populations so reduced they require maximum protection.

=== Fauna ===
The snow vole lives in the matorral and the rock and mountain lizards among the rocks. Among the Lepidoptera are the butterfly Parnassius apollo, the plebicula ni ecensis, and the moth Hyphoraia dejeani. The mammals include squirrels, rabbits, and badgers.

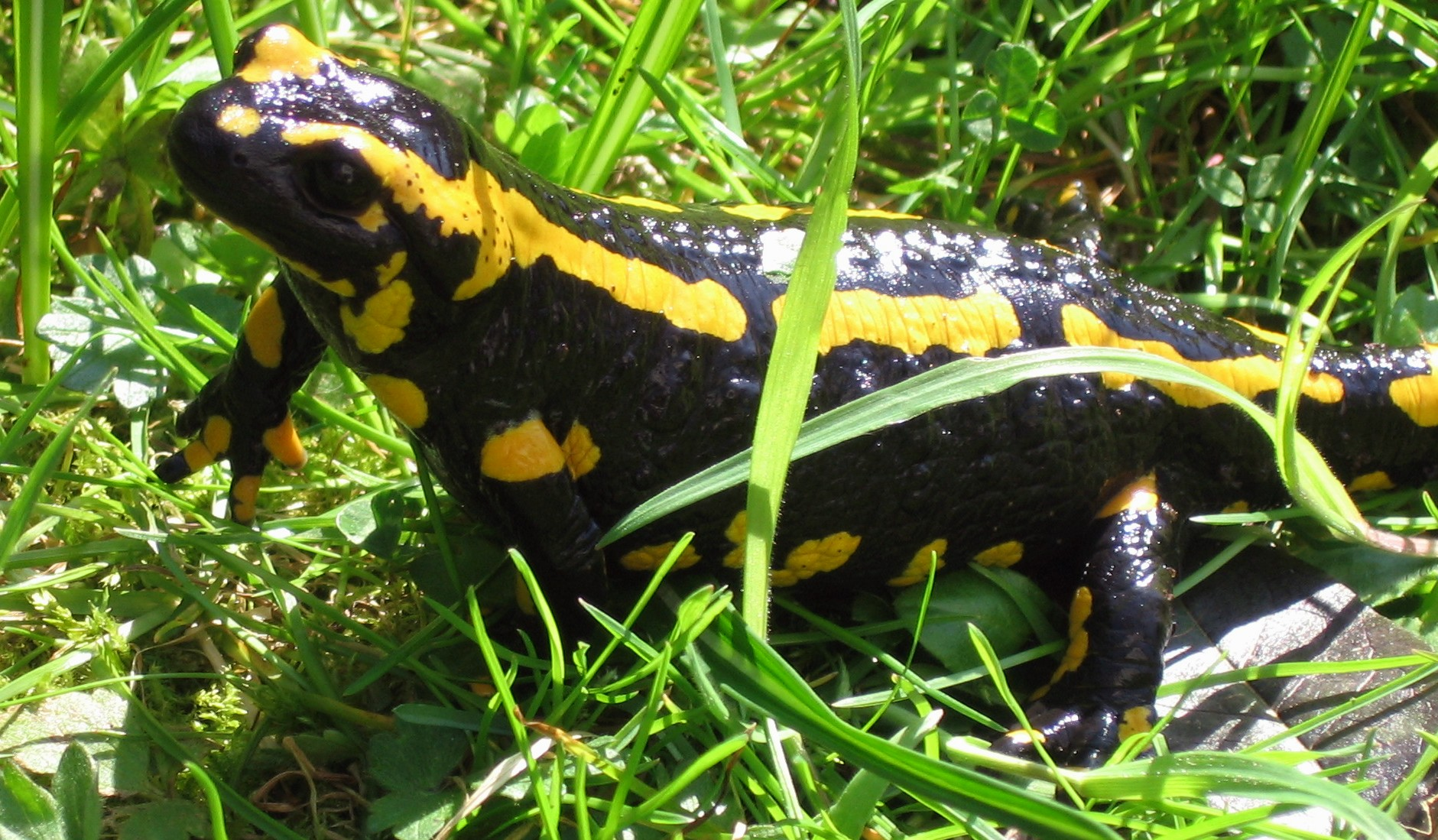
Salamander

- amphibians are found in the ponds and lakes. Ten species of amphibian are recorded, of which six are included in the National Catalogue of Threatened Species. The most common amphibian is the salamander. In 2006 Peñalara was listed as a wetland site under the Ramsar Convention with the name Humedales del Macizo de Peñalara.
- Birds: 79 of the 97 bird species are protected. The most common birds are the hedge sparrow, the gray callaba, the pechiazul, the crag martin, the alpine chough, the imperial eagle, and the black vulture. The Special Protection Area Alto Lozoya includes the natural park within its boundaries.

== Climate ==
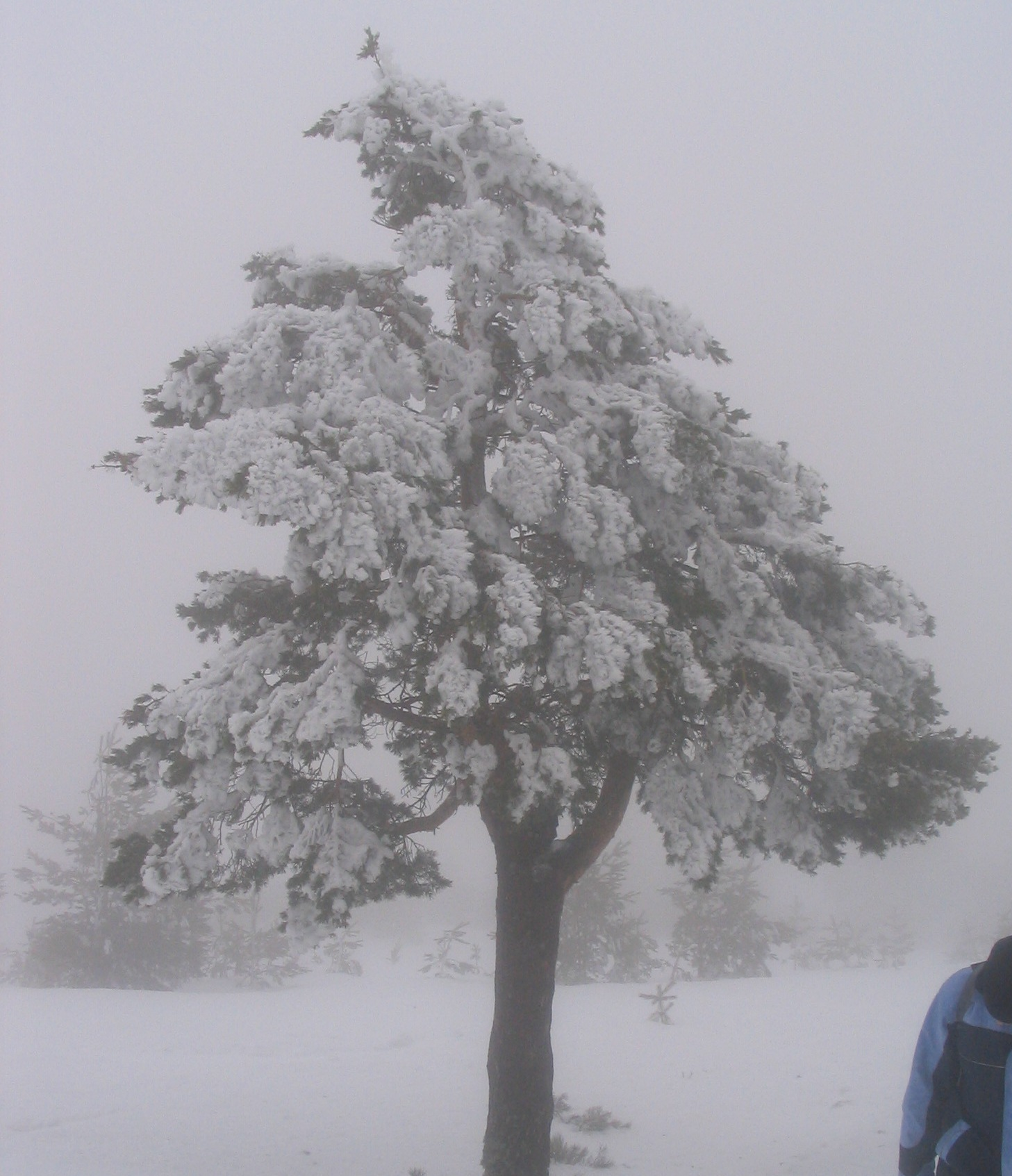
White pine covered in ice from the freezing fog. Image taken in winter.

Peñalara Nature Reserve has a mountain climate characterized by very cold winters and mild summers. Precipitation is plentiful. Snow falls in winter and part of the spring. The area's cold temperatures generally cause rain to freeze into snow from the end of November to the middle of May. In the highest zones, snow may last until July. The Peñalara lakes freeze in December and thaw in March. A meteorological phenomenon of the winter is the freezing fog, or the fog of ice, which covers vegetation in ice when the temperature is less than 0 °C.

The average temperature is about 6 or 7 °C. It reaches a maximum of 22 °C in summer and a minimum of −14 °C in winter. December through February, the temperature does not rise above 0 °C, and the snow cap grows larger. Storms are frequent in spring, summer, and to a lesser degree, autumn. The wind is intense in the mountains, especially when the pressure is low, and a thick fog is common throughout the year. The wind at average strength comes from the northeast. Average relative humidity is about 75%. Adverse weather phenomena such as tornadoes, hurricanes, and earthquakes are rare.

Climate of Puerto de Cotos (1.830 km)

	January	February	March	April	May	June	July	August	September	October	November	December	Year
Temperature Highs (°C)	2.0	2.5	4.7	5.7	10.2	16.3	21.2	21.2	16.6	9.8	5.4	3.2	9.9
Temperature Lows (°C)	-3.1	-2.9	-1.7	-0.8	2.8	7.5	11.3	11.3	8.2	3.6	0.2	-1.7	2.9
Precip. (mm)	141	116	92	138	142	71	33	24	63	143	186	176	1326
Days of Snow	13	12	11	13	5	1	0	0	1	3	8	11	78

== Buildings of Interest ==
The Monastery of Santa María de El Paular, built toward the end of the 14th century, is located only 8 km northeast of the natural park in the district of Rascafría and in the center of Lozoya Valley. Its construction was ordered by King Enrique II of Castille. The building was declared a national monument in 1876. Notable are its cloisters, the church atrium, and the retables. The beauty of the monastery is framed by the surrounding mountains.

== Conservation issues ==
=== Tourism ===
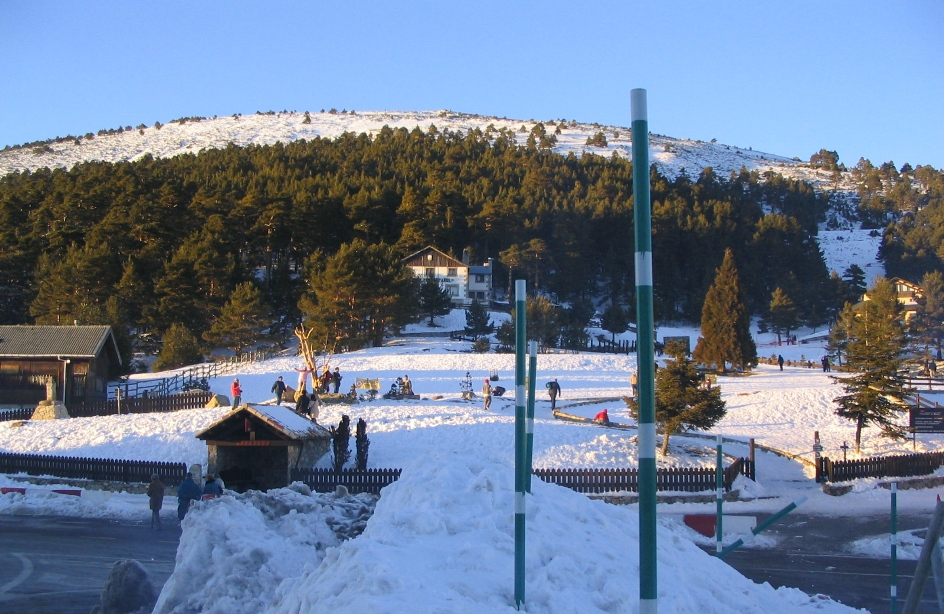
Winter view of Puerto de Cotos.

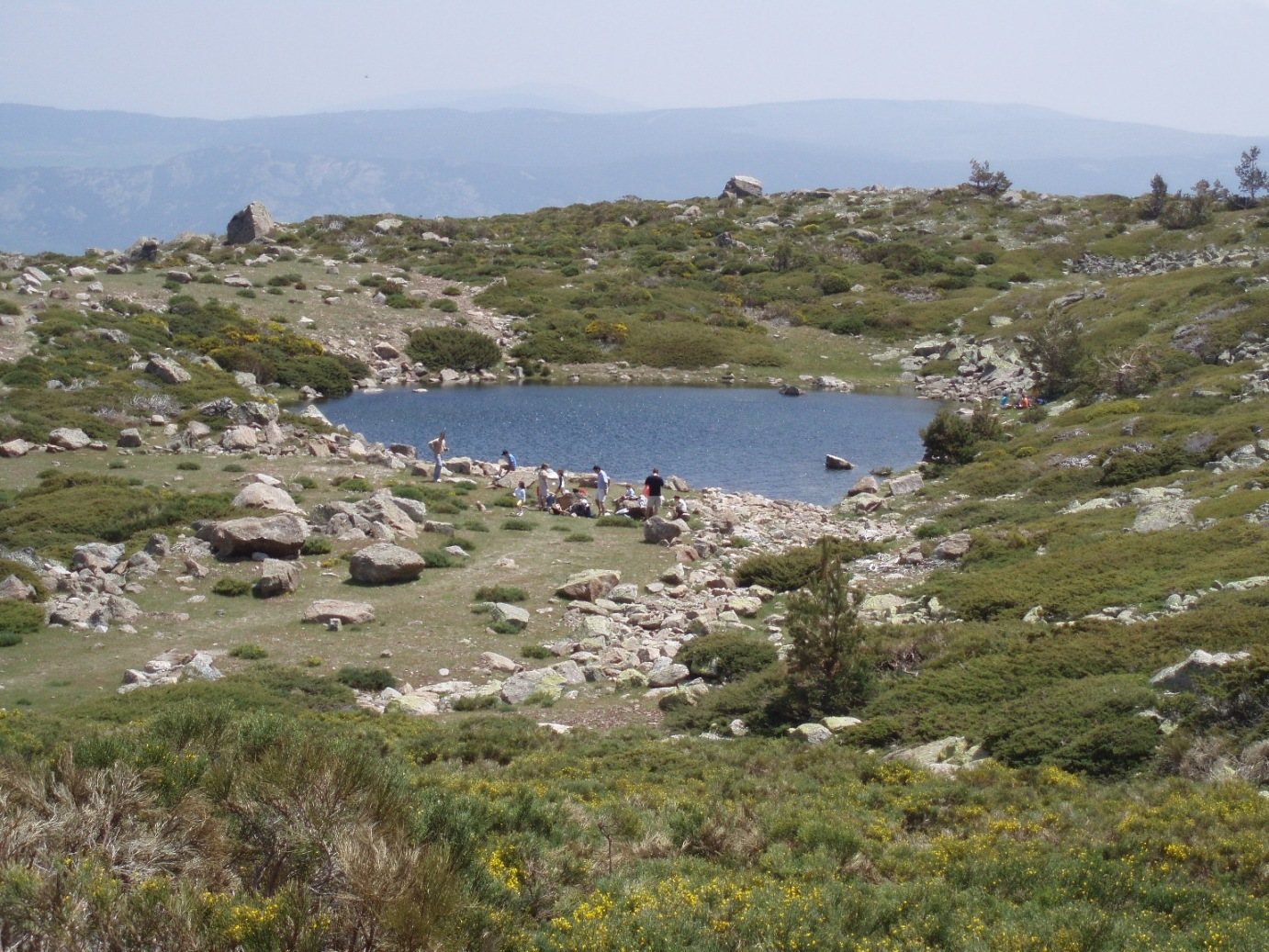
Tourists in Chica Lake.

For centuries Peñalara has drawn hundreds of sightseers with its magnificent views and landscape. Today, the natural park is visited by an average of 130,000 people every year. Puerto de Cotos, a mountain pass at the reserve's southern boundary connecting the Community of Madrid and the province of Segovia, is the center of tourism and point of departure for all routes crossing the reserve. From the same place runs the C-9 line of the Cercanías Madrid, which leaves from Cercedilla and is known as the Guadarrama rail. This transportation route sees massive use during the festive days. There is also a bus line running through the mountain pass. The major parking lot in the tourism center accommodates cars and buses. An information building at Puerto de Cotos dispenses maps of trails and safety rules. The tourism center also holds a restaurant, the headquarters of the Spanish Alpine Club, a mountain-climbing school, and a sled rental. In winter the large esplanade of Puerto de Cotos becomes a sledding track.

At the foot of the Older Sister, some 300 m south of Peñalara Great Lake and 2.075 km high, is the obsolete Zabala mountain shelter, which is now used only for storage of maintenance supplies. The hotels and lodges nearest to Peñalara Nature Reserve are in Puerto de Navacerrada and the town of Rascafría.

The flood of sightseers during the festival days is intense. The most popular activity in the park is hiking. Extra precautions are needed in winter, when the bad weather and thick snow and ice make for hard travel and easy disorientation.

Another popular activity is mountain climbing, which can be done in authorized areas on the Peñalara cirque. The mountain-climbing sectors are Two Sisters, Cosaco, Placas Duro, Teresa, Trapecio, and Zabala. In winter one can also ski cross-country on the broad paths and areas near Puerto de Cotos, which are vestiges of the old Valcotos ski resort. This is particularly popular with Madrid and Segovia residents.

=== National park ===
During the 1920s, various intellectuals from the Institución Libre de Enseñanza (Free Teaching Institute) showed the great ecological importance of the Sierra de Guadarrama. They planned the creation of a Guadarrama National Park to protect the high zones of the sierra. Their project was not carried into effect, due to changes in government and the Spanish Civil War.

The great scientific interest in the region throughout the 1920s prompted its designation in 1930 as a Natural Area of National Interest to protect it from outside attack.

In the 1980s began a project to protect the slopes of Peñalara Peak, including the cirque and the lakes. On 15 June 1990 the Community of Madrid declared the zone a Natural Park of the Peak, Cirque, and Lakes of Peñalara by the law 6/1990. From 1998 to the beginning of the 21st century, the old Valcotos ski resort that occupied a large part of the protected area was dismantled. The ski lifts were removed and the slopes reforested. This pioneering action also brought about an improvement of the facilities at Puerto de Cotos.

At the beginning of the 21st century, the Community of Madrid together with Castilla y León declared that a large portion of the sierra would form a Guadarrama National Park. It seemed likely to affect the level of protection given to Peñalara. Paradoxically, the protection of the natural park risked being reduced, as the President of the Community of Madrid wished to promote hunting in the sierra.

== Panoramic Views ==
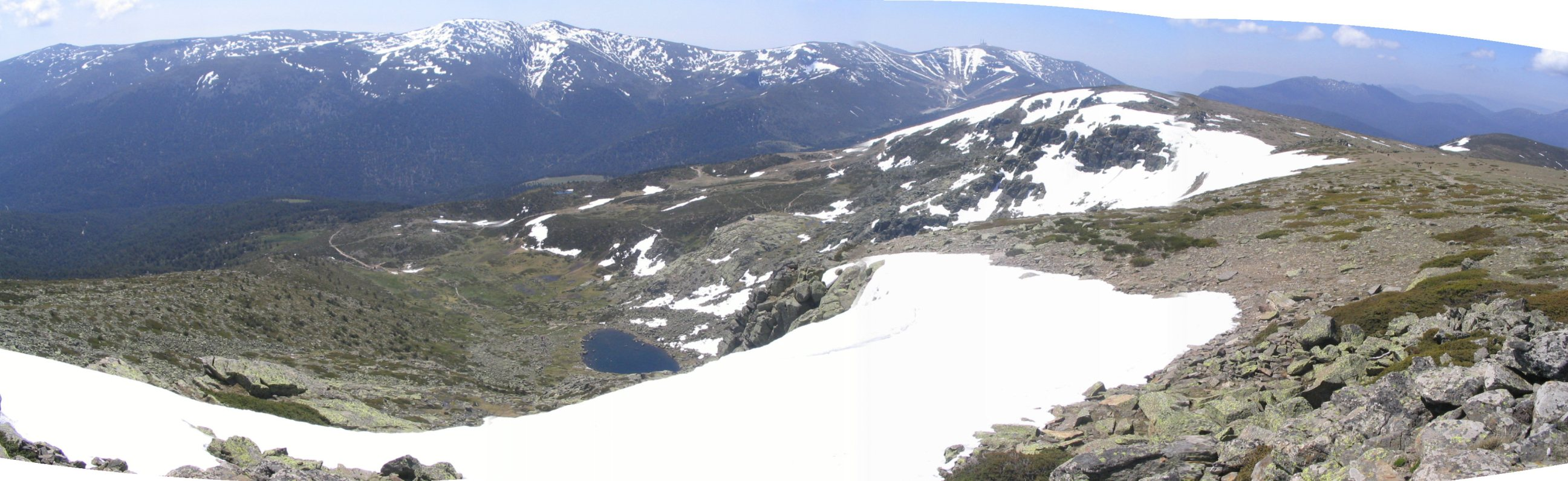
From left to right can be seen the north face of the two Horseshoe Heads (2.383 km), Valdemartín Hill (2.280 km), the Globe (2.265 km), Six Peaks (2.138 km), and in the foreground the lakes and cirque of Peñalara. Image taken near the peak of Peñalara.

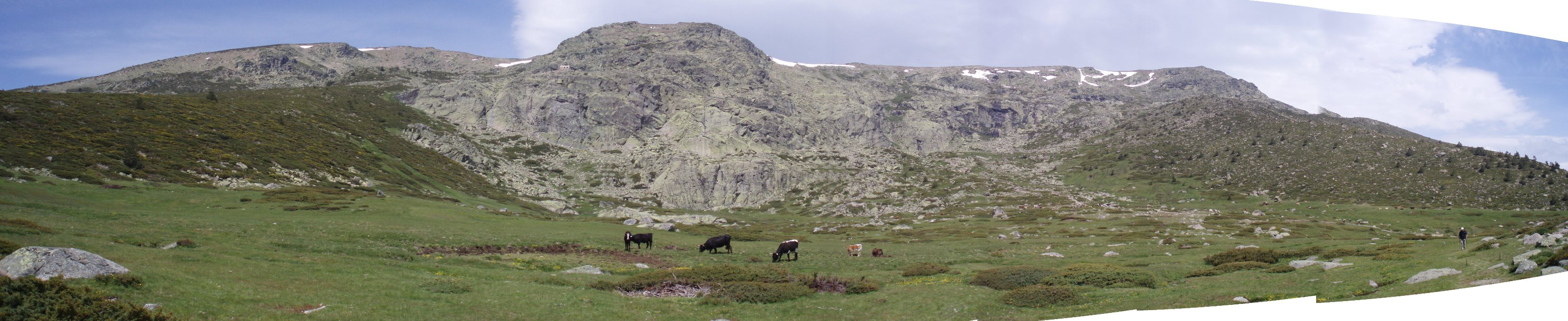
Panorama of the Peñalara cirque.

== Cartography ==
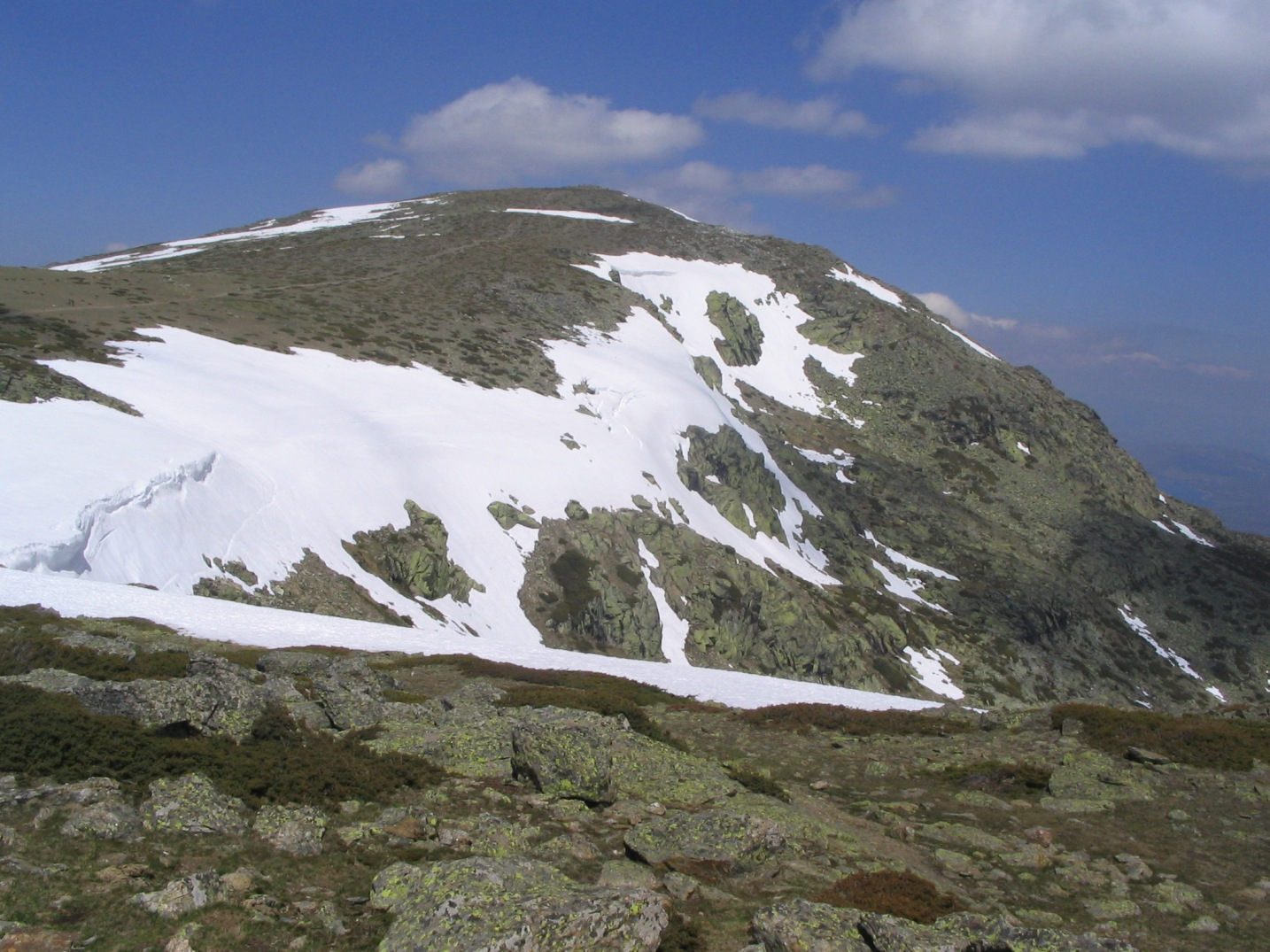
View of Peñalara's cirque from the south.

- Map "Guide to Sierra de Guadarrama 1:50.000", edited by Instituto Geográfico Nacional. OCLC 874543805
- Map "Guadarrama sightseeing 1:25.000", edited by Alpine publishing. ISBN 84-8090-159-4
- Map "Sightseeing at La Pedriza 1:25.000", edited by Alpine publishing. ISBN 84-8090-160-8
- Map "Sierra de Guadarrama 1:50.000", edited by The Green Store. ISBN 84-611-3107-X

== See also ==
- Sierra de Guadarrama
- Guadarrama National Park
- Peñalara
