= Puerto de Cotos =

Mountain pass in the Sistema Central

Coordinates: 40°49′24″N 3°57′44″W

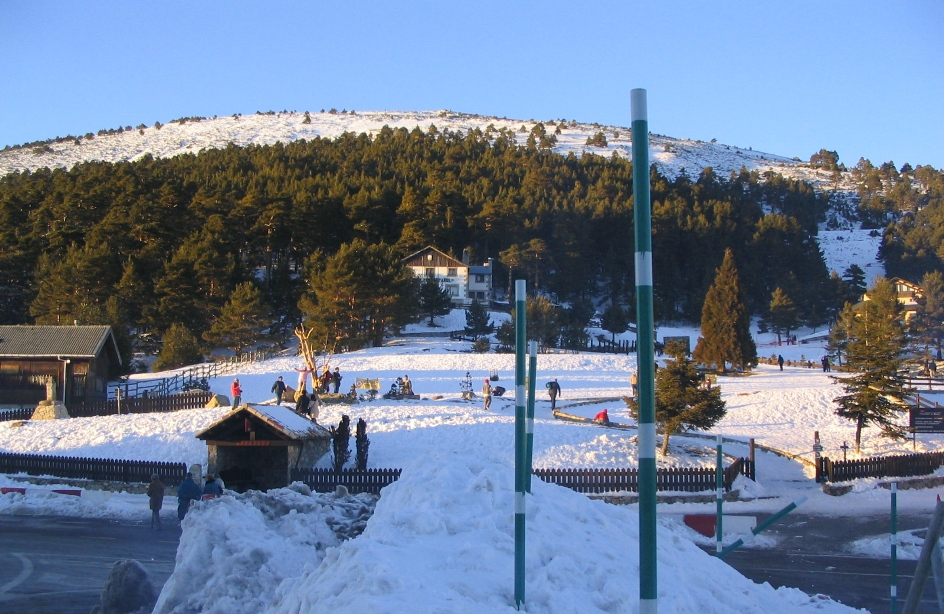
- Between Segovia and Madrid
- Elevation: 1,830 metres (6,000 ft)
- Traversed by: SG-615 and M-604 roads

Third Approach
- Location: Community of Madrid
- Range: Sierra de Guadarrama

Puerto de Cotos (Note: Also "puerto de los Cotos".) or Puerto del Paular is a mountain pass in the Sierra de Guadarrama, that separates the Spanish provinces of Segovia and Madrid. It is located 1830 meters above sea level.

== Location ==
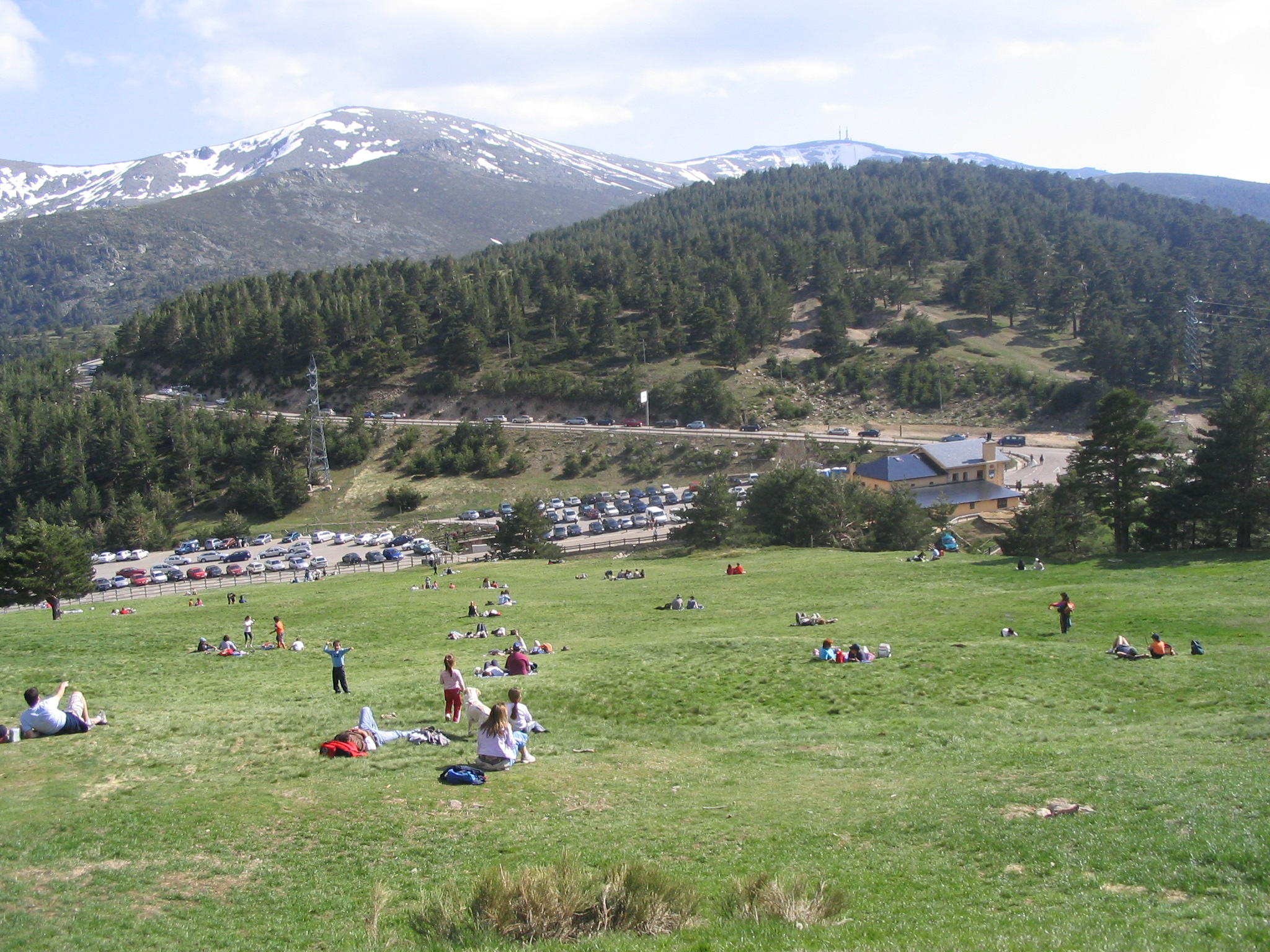
View of the meadow, the mountaineering school and the parking lot of the mountain pass of Cotos in spring.

It is located in the Sierra de Guadarrama, belonging to the Sistema Central.

It geographically separates the valleys of Valsaín, to the west, and Lozoya, to the east. It also separates the massif of Peñalara, to the north, and the mountain range of the Cuerda Larga, to the south.

It is called "Los Cotos" because of the small stone posts, called "cotos", that were there until the 20th century to indicate the path that crossed it when the snow covered it.

== Access ==
The road that crosses the pass is the M-604, called SG-615 on the Segovian side, which goes from Rascafría to the Navacerrada pass. From the pass itself there is a road that leads to the ski resort of Valdesquí.

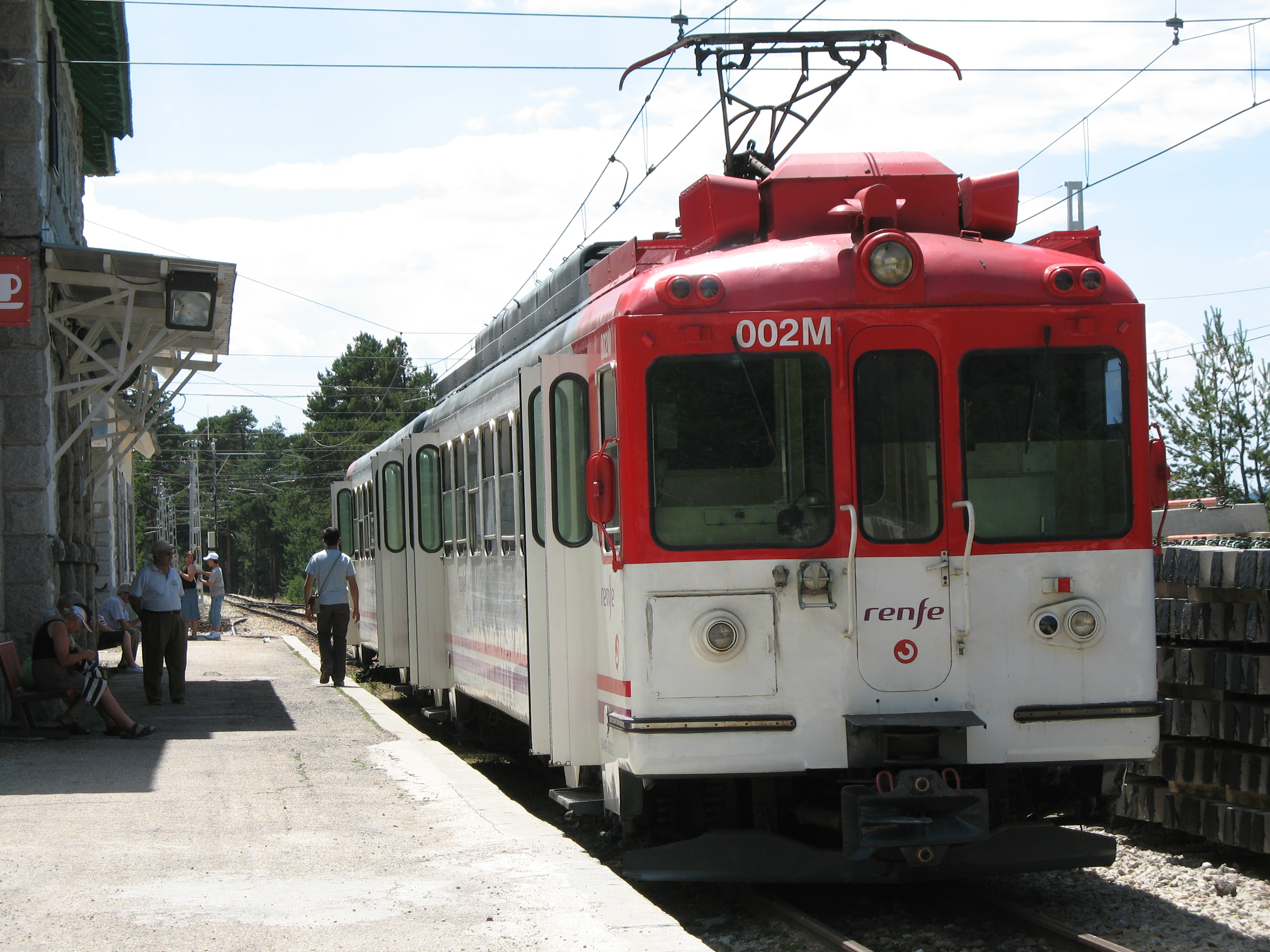
Guadarrama railroad in the station of Cotos.

It has a railroad station of the C-9 line of Cercanías Madrid, also known as Ferrocarril de Cotos, which crosses the mountain range and runs through the Navacerrada pass.

The Puerto de Cotos is the starting point of several trails that go into the national park of the Sierra de Guadarrama, of another trail that ascends to the Bola del Mundo and was also the starting point of the old ski resort of Valcotos.

== Buildings ==
In this pass there is a building of the Spanish Alpine Club (in Spanish: Club Alpino Español), a ski and sled rental establishment, two sled runs, the Venta Marcelino bar-restaurant and an information center of the Sierra de Guadarrama National Park.

== History ==
During the Spanish Civil War a Republican detachment settled in the port.

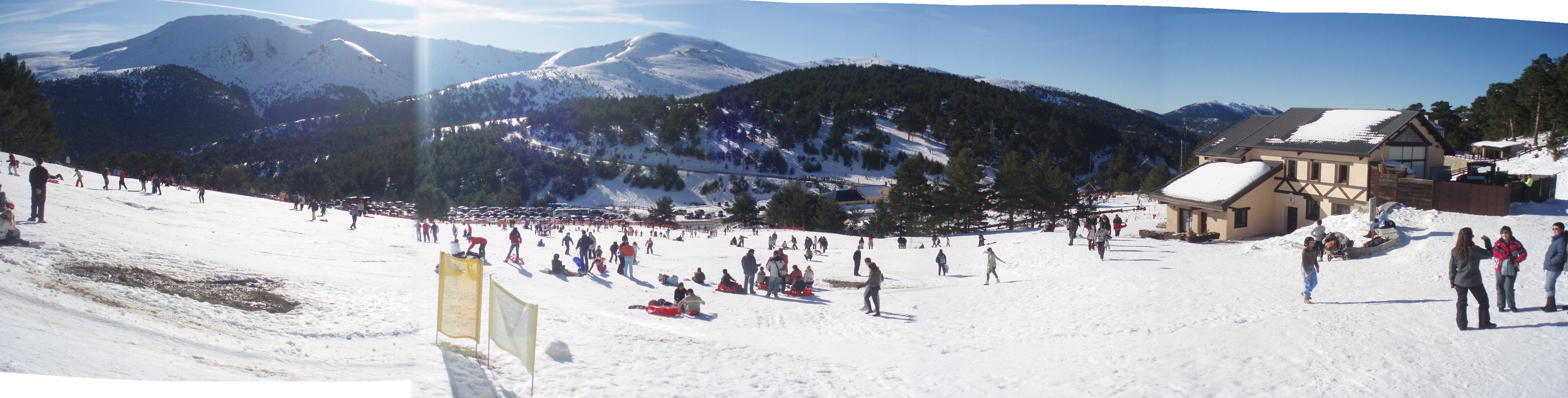
Winter view of the port meadow full of families enjoying sledding.

== See also ==
- Peñalara Natural Park
- Analemmatic sundial
