= Valsain Mountains =

Mountains of the National Park of the Sierra de Guadarrama, Spain

The Valsain Mountains (Spanish: Montes de Valsaín) are located in the Valsain Valley, on the northern slope of the Sierra de Guadarrama and in the municipality of Real Sitio de San Ildefonso, belonging to the province of Segovia (Castilla y León, Spain).

They are formed by two mountains (called Montes, in Spanish), Pinar and Matas, both of public utility and belonging to the National Parks Autonomous Agency, which manages it through the Centro Montes y Aserradero de Valsaín ("Valsain Mountains and Sawmill Center").

Three areas for recreation and dissemination of natural values have been enabled within its boundaries. These are: Boca de Asno—which has an interpretation center—Los Asientos, and El Robledo. The Centro Nacional de Educación Ambiental (CENEAM) also has its facilities there.

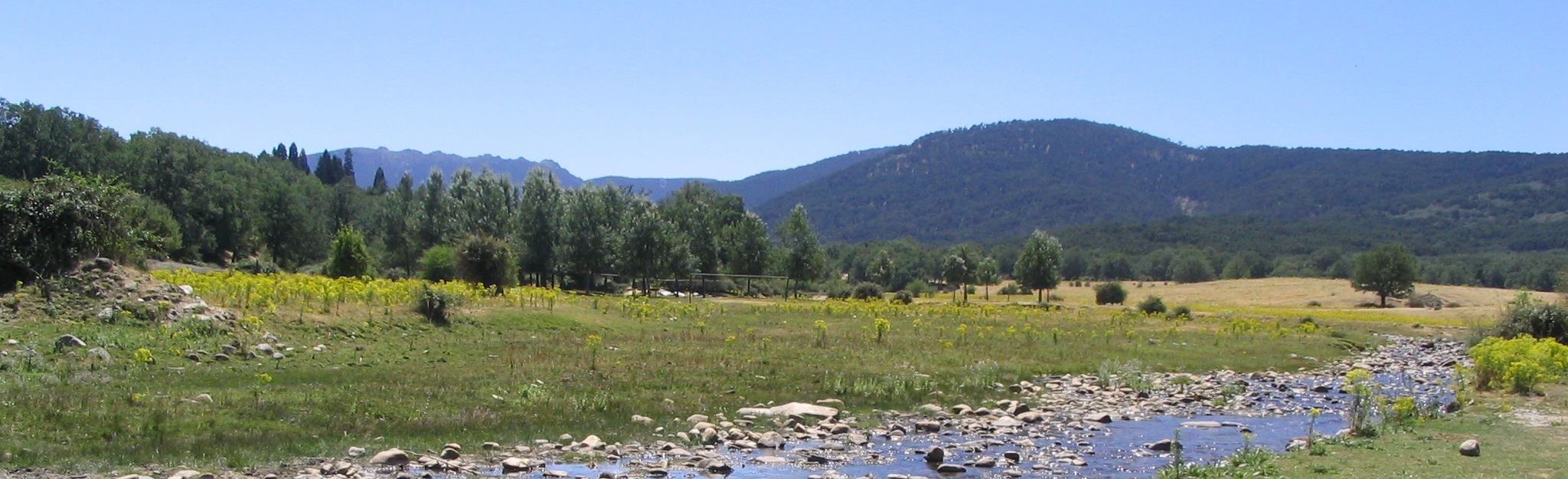
Valsain Valley as seen from Valsain.

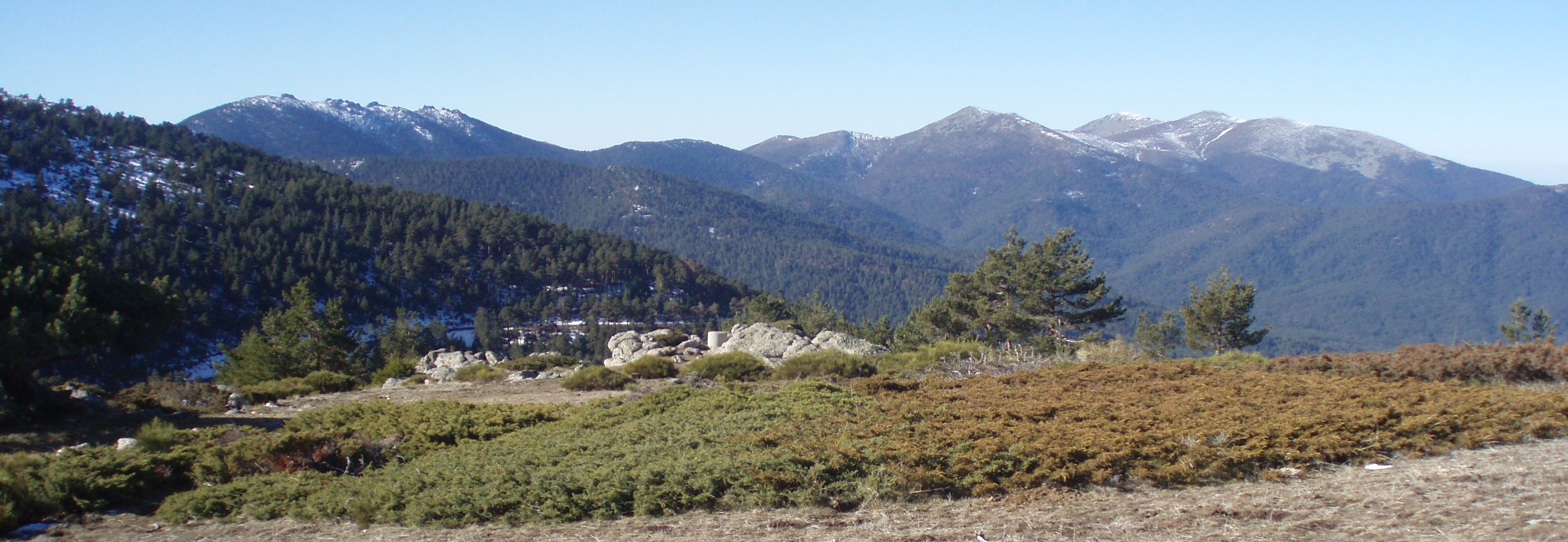
Siete Picos and La Mujer Muerta. These are two areas of the Valsain Mountains.

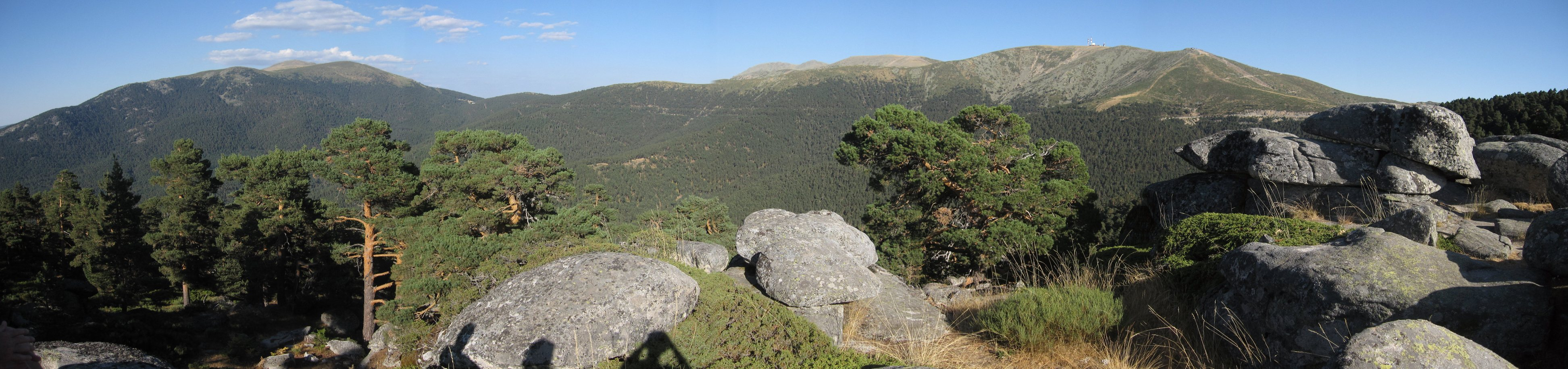
Peñalara and north face of Cuerda Larga seen from La Gallarza viewpoint.

== Description ==
The Valsain Valley is located on the northern slope of the Sierra de Guadarrama crowned by the passes of Navacerrada and La Fuenfría, known as the historical pass of the sierra. The Sierra de Guadarrama covers it on the east side, while the mountain range of La Mujer Muerta covers it on the west. Between them, the valley extends with an orientation from south to north, an average width of 6 km and an approximate length of 9 km. The altitude of the area varies between 1100 masl and the 2125 of Siete Picos. It is crossed by the rivers Eresma, Acebeda, and Peces. The soils are acid based on granite and gneiss.

The surface occupied by the Valsain Mountains is 10 672 ha, of which 7622 are of Monte Pinar and 3046 of Monte Matas, both occupied by different tree species depending on the altitude. Scots pine is predominant and has received the nickname Pino de Valsaín ("Valsain Pine"). It produces excellent wood and has been exploited for a long time, being the economic engine of the valley.

The environmental richness is very high as this is an area of little human activity and historically protected as a reserve and hunting ground by the Spanish monarchy. There is a great diversity of animal species, especially birds and plants.

The valley and the mountains are crossed by the CL-601 regional road that connects Segovia with Madrid through the Navacerrada pass. Another series of asphalted roads and highways (in different states of preservation) cross the area too; they are usually closed to vehicular traffic. Among these roads, the road that crosses the Fuenfría pass stands out, a historic pass through the mountain range that has been adapted over time to the different types of roads, from the mere prehistoric blacksmith road, the Roman road (of which there are important remains) to the asphalted road (whose last version was the road known as Carretera de la República or "Road of the Republic"). This pass has been closed to traffic and replaced by the pass of Navacerrada first and the Alto del León—and the corresponding tunnels—later.

=== Geology and landscape ===
Like the rest of the Sistema Central, the materials that form the soil of the valley in which the Valsain Mountains are located are of granite and gneiss origin. They are rigid materials that give the soil an outstanding acidity. These materials were broken following a series of fracture lines that formed the pits and mountain massifs.

The physiognomy of the mountains is structured in three landscape units that are organized depending on altitude, orientation (one is on the sunny side and the other on the shady side), soil, water and prevailing winds, among other factors, where human intervention is one of the most important. These units are: the mountains, the valleys, and the ramps.

=== Hydrography ===
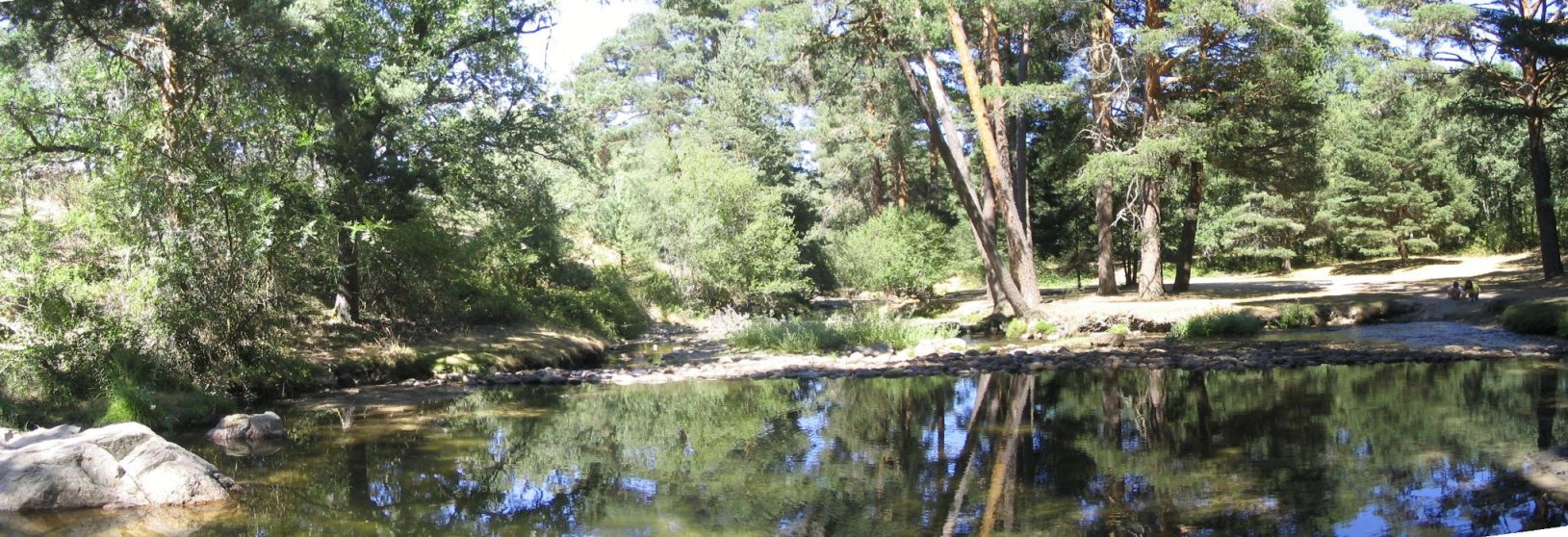
Pool in the Eresma River as it passes through the Valsain Mountains

The main water courses that run through the Valsain Valley—and with it its mountains—are the rivers Eresma, Acebeda and Peces, all of them in the upper part of their basins. These rivers are formed by the sum of a multitude of small streams that flow down from the mountains surrounding the valley. Annual rainfall usually ranges from 885 mm in the lowlands to 1170 mm in the highlands. It is very often in the form of snow, especially on the summits of the mountains where snow can be seen well into the spring.

The Eresma river is formed by the streams that flow down the northern slopes of Siete Picos, Alto del Telégrafo and Minguete, on its left side and the stream that flows down from Puerto de Cotos.

The Acebeda river is formed by the waters that flow down the slopes of Montón de Trigo and La Pinareja.

The Peces river runs along the eastern edge of the Monte del Pinar.

=== Vegetation ===
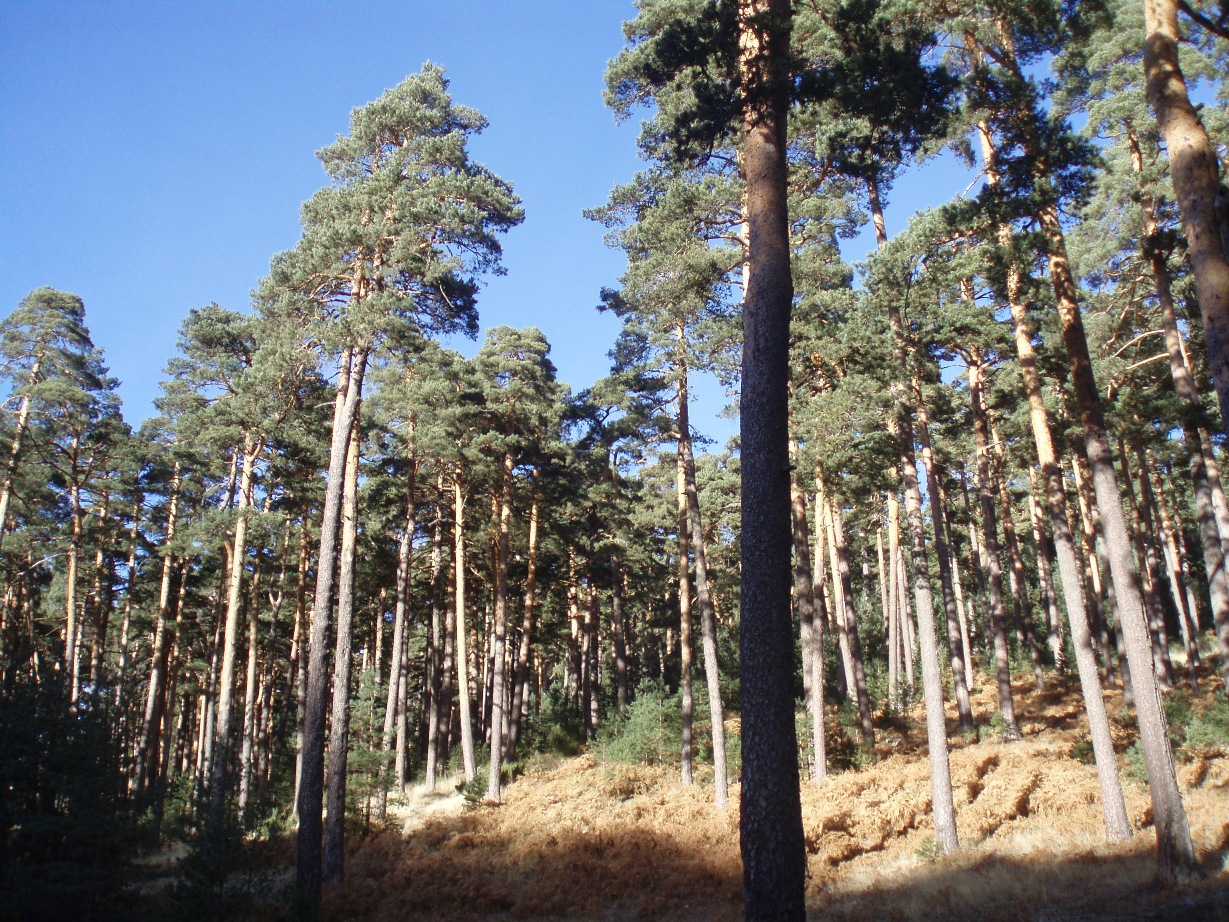
Scots pine forest in the Valsain Mountains.

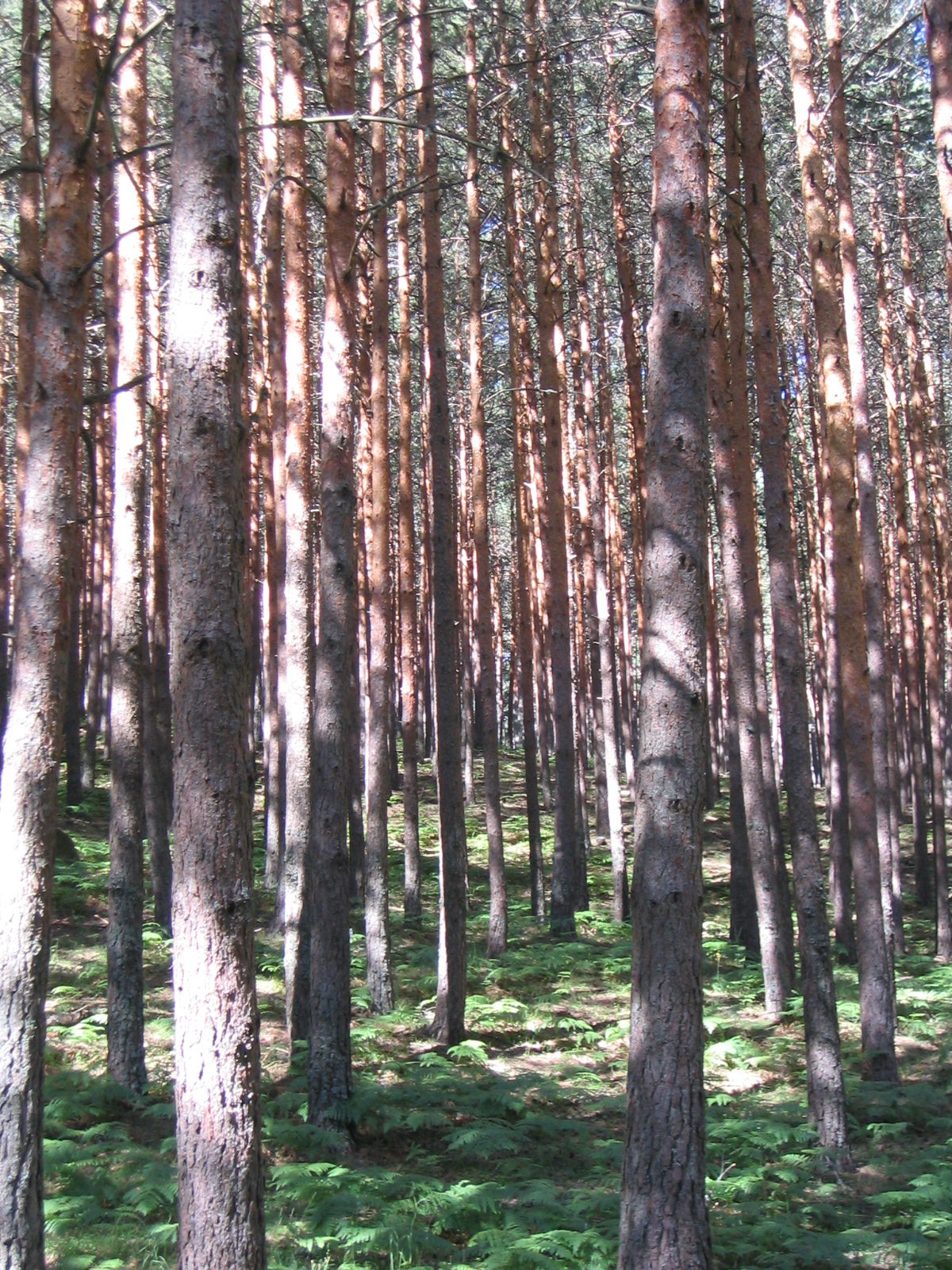
Pine forest in Valsain Valley.

The predominant tree species of this area is the pinus sylvestris or Scots pine, that occupies the upper part of the mountains, above 1200 meters. Further down, the Pyrenean oak can be found, and in the lower area there are patches of holm oak. On the banks of the rivers there are formations of gallery forests, and we can also find holly, yew, poplar, sour cherry, ash and maple trees, which are combined with the shrubs and bushes such as broom, rock rose steppe, juniper, and heather. The vegetation is complemented by meadows where cattle and horses graze. Therefore, we find a diversity that goes from the oak and holm oak groves at the bottom of the valley to the meadows of the summits.

There are 867 catalogued species, of which only 69 are allochthonous (non-native) and are located in gardens and urbanized spaces.

The main species that exist in the Valsain Mountains are the following:

==== Scots pine ====
The Scots pine (Pinus sylvestris) forms the extensive pine forests that cover most of the mountains. It is located between 1200 and 1900 masl of altitude, this being the forest limit of the area. It reaches an average height of 25 meters and can sometimes exceed 30 meters. In the sunny areas the volume of the canopy is lower than in the shady areas. The undergrowth of the pine forests is usually composed of oak (Quercus pyrenaica, this below 1400 masl) and retama, juniper, broom, and brambles. In the clearings that open up in the pine forests, brambles abound.

In the upper parts of the undergrowth there is juniper, broom, nightshade, and wild berries. And in the lower parts, retamas, rowan, blackthorn, hawthorn, heather, hazel, cherry and holly.

==== Pyrenean oak ====
The Pyrenean oak (Quercus pyrenaica) occupies the lower part. It is located between 1000 and 1400 meters of altitude. It is very affected by the late and early snowfalls. Many times it plays the role of undergrowth species.

In its forests there is an undergrowth composed mainly of steppe, blackthorn, blackthorn, privet, honeysuckle, broom, hawthorn and rose.

==== Holm oak ====
Holm oak (Quercus ilex) occupies two small areas in the Valsain Mountains. It is established between the altitudes of 1300 and 1350 meters in the area of the slopes of Cabeza Grande and between 1118 and 1225 meters in the northern wing of Cerro Matabueyes. Its understory is composed of steppe and similar species.

==== Grasslands ====
There are different types of grasslands. All of them are dotted with thorny woody species such as Rosa sp., Crataegus monogyna, Prunus spinosa, if heavily razed; and by shrubs such as steppe, but also by scotch broom (Cytisus scoparius) or broom (Genista florida).

The grasslands are:

- Nardus: They are established above 1300 and 1400 meters of altitude, above the pine forest level. They are meadows composed of Nardus stricta accompanied by Festuca rubra, F. indigesta, Anthoxanthum odoratum, Lotus corniculatus, Trifolium pratense and Trifolium repens. They have a high production but poor bromatological quality. They are frequented by wildlife and equine livestock.
- Montanan grazing lands: Between 1100 and 1300 meters of altitude, in hydrically poor soils, these continuous pastures are used by cattle and horses. These meadows can also be seen in oak and pine forest clearings. The most frequent species are Festuca elegans, F. ampla, Bromus rigidus, B. hordaceus, B. diandus, Poa bulbosa, Aira praecox, Lolium perenne, Lotus corniculatus, Medicago sativa, Ornithopus perpusillus, Phleum pratense, Plantago lanceolata, Trifolium strictum and T. campestre.
- Siliceous grazing lands: These meadows of continuous pasture are used for sheep and cattle grazing due to their bromatological quality and good grazing characteristics. They are composed of Poa bulbosa, Trifolium subterraneum, Bromus hordaceus, Lupinus angustifolius, Eryngium tenue, Ornithopus compressus, Medicago rigidula and Vulpia bromoides.
- Vallicar: This is a grassland that is formed when the grazing lands are enclosed. They are typical of lowland areas and occur in humid soils. They are used for grazing livestock. They are composed of Vulpia bromoides, Ornithopus compressus, Holcus lanatus, Aira praecox, Arrenatherum album, A. elatius, Briza media, Bromas hordaceus, Cynosorus echinatus, Dactilys glomerata and Trifolium striatum.

=== Fauna ===
The catalog of the fauna of the Valsaín Mountains lists more than 210 species of vertebrate animals and 570 species of insects.

Among the vertebrates we find the following distribution:

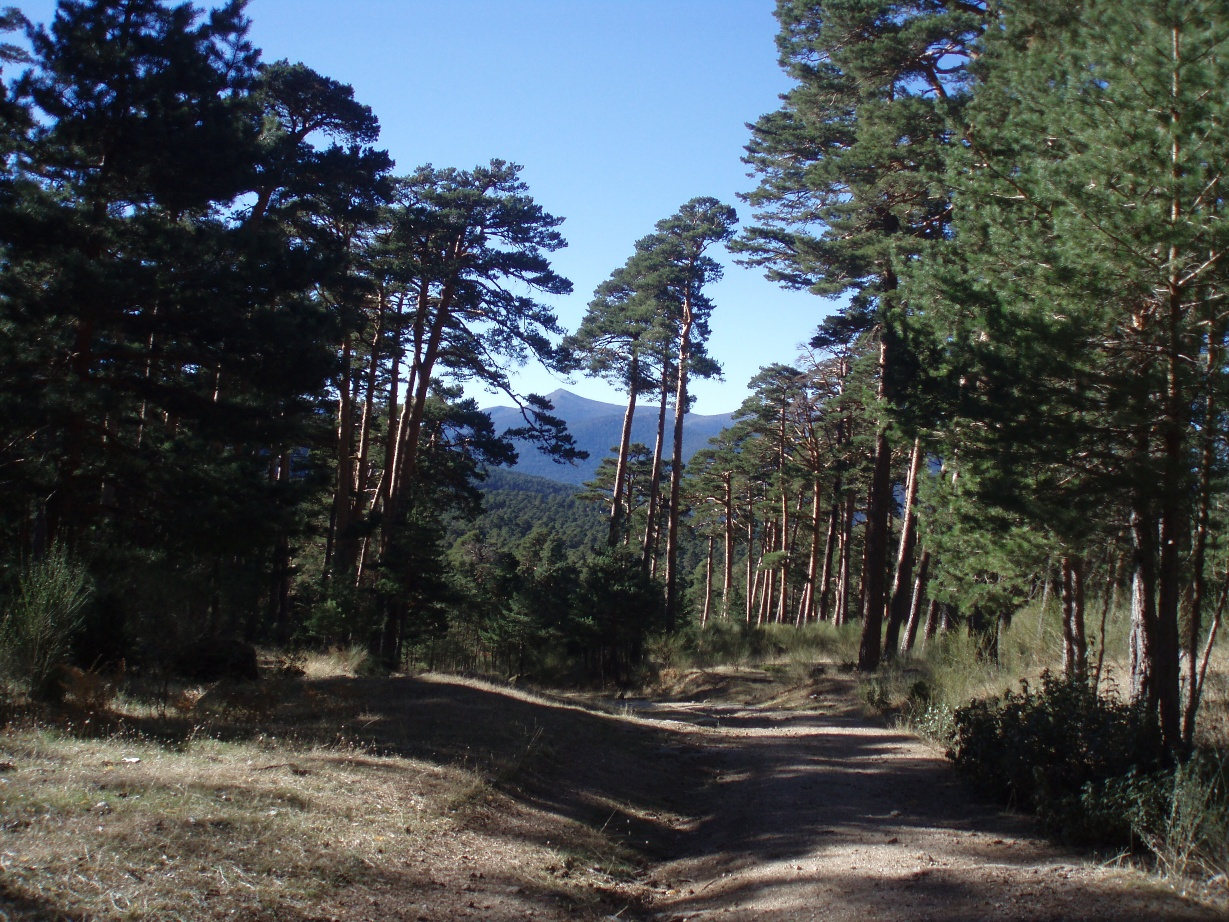
Pine forests of the Valsain Mountains with Montón de Trigo in the background.

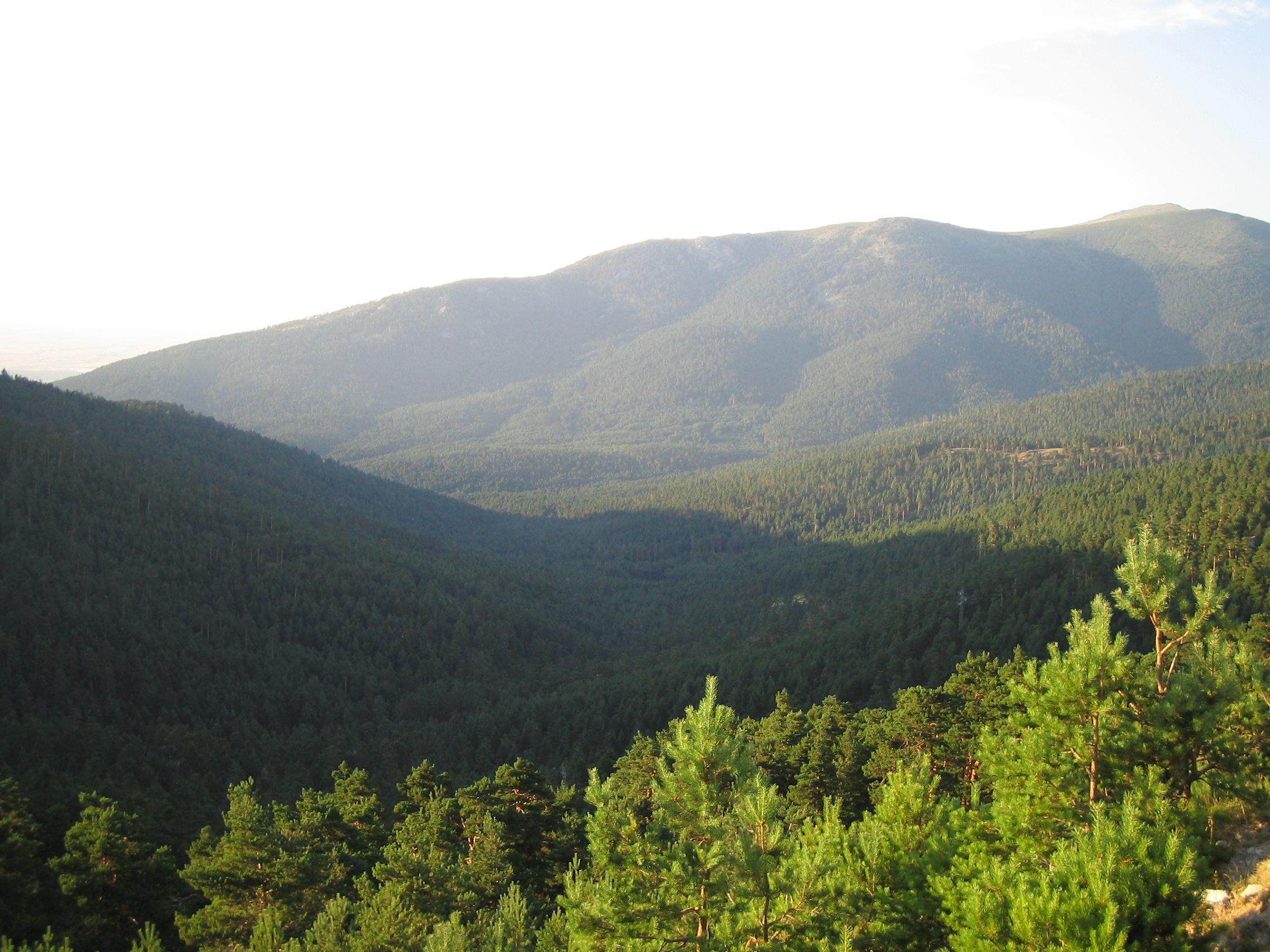
Valsain Valley with the Peñalara mountain range in the background.

==== Birds ====
It is the most numerous group with 150 different species among which there are more than 100 nesting birds. The black vulture (Aegypus monachus) and specimens of imperial eagle (Aquila adalberti) stand out for their numbers. There are also griffon vulture (Gyps fulvus) and other nocturnal and diurnal birds of prey. We also find an important community of forest birds: tits, piciformes, and several forest corvidae (jays, ravens and crows.)

==== Mammals ====
There are 45 species of mammals of which 15 are bats. You can find wild boars, foxes, roe deers, wild cats and otters. Among the bats: Myotis blythii nathalinae is an Iberian endemism, as are Sorex granarius, Talpa caeca occidentalis and Microtus lusitanicus depressus (Pitymys) . The hedgehog (Erinaceus europaeus) is also abundantly present, as well as the red squirrel (Sciurus vulgaris).

==== Reptiles ====
There are 15 different species of reptiles, the most relevant being the snub-nosed viper (Vipera latastei), the ringed snake (Natrix natrix), the cyren's rock lizard (Iberolacerta cyreni) and the Schreiber's green lizard (Lacerta schreiberi).

==== Amphibians ====
There are 10 catalogued species of amphibians. They are found in wetlands and the most relevant are salamanders (Salamandra salamandra bejarae), newts and different species of frogs and toads such as the Iberian stream frog (Rana iberica).

==== Fish ====
In the rivers of the mountains live 5 species of fish, the most abundant are the trout, the gobies and the bermejuela.

==== Insects ====
Among the more than 570 species of insects are the greater stag beetle (Lucanus cervus) and the butterflies Graellsia isabelae, Parnassius apollo, Leptidea sinapis and Boloria selene castellana.

== Management and uses ==
The management of the Valsaíi forests is carried out by the Centro Montes y Aserradero de Valsaín, which seeks to maintain the traditional use of the richness of the forests with their conservation.

The management combines forest and livestock exploitation, the traditional use of the forests, with public use. The opening of the Valsain forests for the enjoyment and relaxation of the citizens also seeks to disseminate the natural values among the population.

The activity generated around the Valsain Mountains has a very significant influence on the environment and on the municipality of Real Sitio de San Ildefonso. It generates direct activity for more than 150 people a year and is the main driver of forestry and wood processing activity.

=== Public use ===
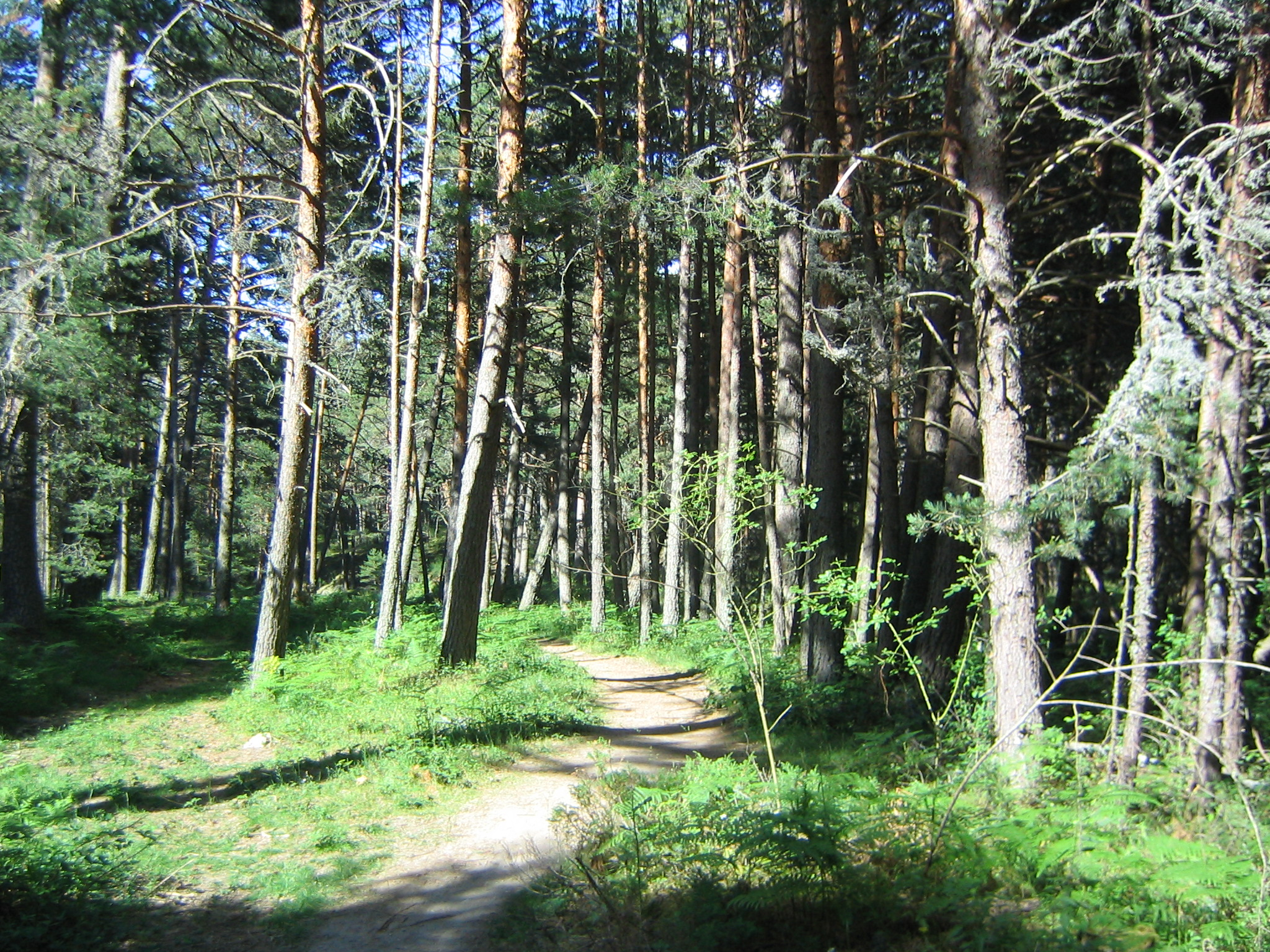
Road to Pesquerías del Eresma.

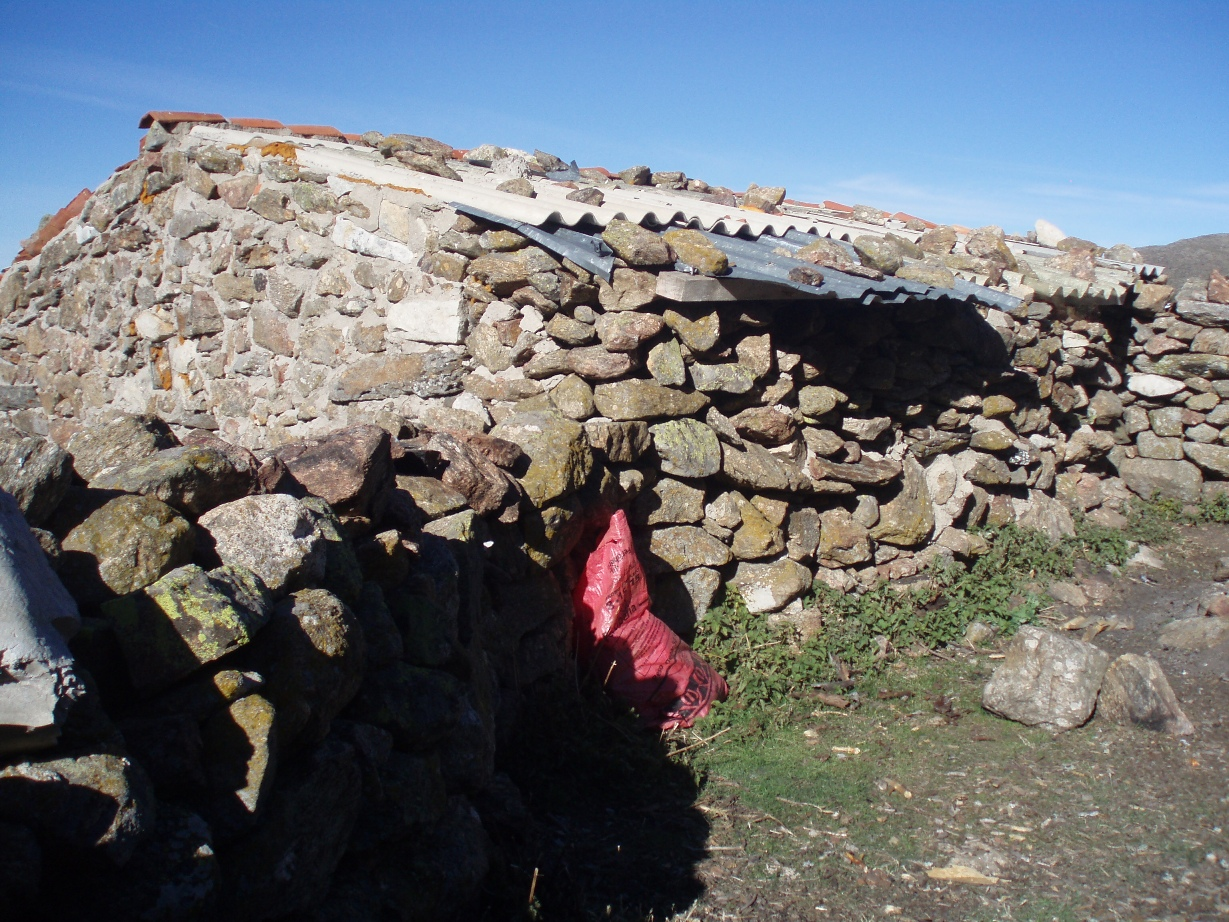
Unguarded mountain refuge called "Aranguez", located at 1890 meters altitude, on the northern slope of Peñalara.

Aimed at the enjoyment of the mountains by the general public and the dissemination of natural values, three recreational areas have been set up. These are Boca de Asno, Los Asientos and El Robledo. All of them are on the edge of the road that crosses the valley, the CL-601 and have parking areas and different services.

In the Boca del Asno area, there is an Interpretation Center, opened in 2004, which brings the mountains closer to visitors by showing their history, natural wealth and management. The center is structured in six parts:

- Entrance: On display is the cutting of a century-old trunk of a pine tree, which shows the historical events that have taken place during its life and, once inside the building, there are several terrariums where you can observe cuts of the soil of the mountains.
- Reception: It is the point of attention to the public and where you can acquire different publications with information about the area and also information about the different routes that can be taken, both free and guided.
- Projection: A historical video about the mountains is shown in a projection room. It shows the link between the mountains and the monarchy and its impact on the inhabitants of Valsain and La Granja.
- Scenographic exhibition: A virtual walk through the different ecosystems that can be found in the mountains. A full day that begins with a sunrise and sunset in the mountains.
- Thematic exhibition: Information is displayed in different formats, from panels to computer screens, on different aspects of the Valsain Mountains and the different routes available.
- Audiovisual room: Projection of an audiovisual showing, through the thread of the history of a pine tree, the process of pine forest management, and its interpellation with other species.

A system of guided routes—free service—intends to disseminate the natural values and knowledge of the terrain. These routes start in the three recreation areas and other places in the mountains such as Cogorros, Puente de la Cantina, Puerto los Cotos and Pradera de Navalhorno.

A dense network of roads and highways, with unauthorized access for unauthorized vehicles, allows any excursion or ascent to any of the mountains surrounding the valley, which in many cases exceed 2000 masl, with slopes of more than 1000 masl.

The facilities of the Centro Nacional de Educación Ambiental (the CENEAM) are located within the lands occupied by the Valsain Mountains. The CENEAM is oriented to inform, educate and raise awareness about the environment. The center consists of several facilities among which the projection of a slideshow about life in the mountains during the seasons of the year stands out. There are several rooms showing the different peculiarities of the Valsain Valley and the Guadarrama mountain range, which are complemented by an interactive walk through the pine forest surrounding the facilities.

Among the different routes available to learn about the natural environment, the Pesquerías del Eresma ("Eresma Fisheries") is worth mentioning for its singularity and low difficulty (which makes it suitable for any type of person). The Pesquerías del Eresma is a route by the margins of the river that begins in Boca del Asno and ascends by the left bank using the adjustments made so that the kings could travel comfortably to go fishing.

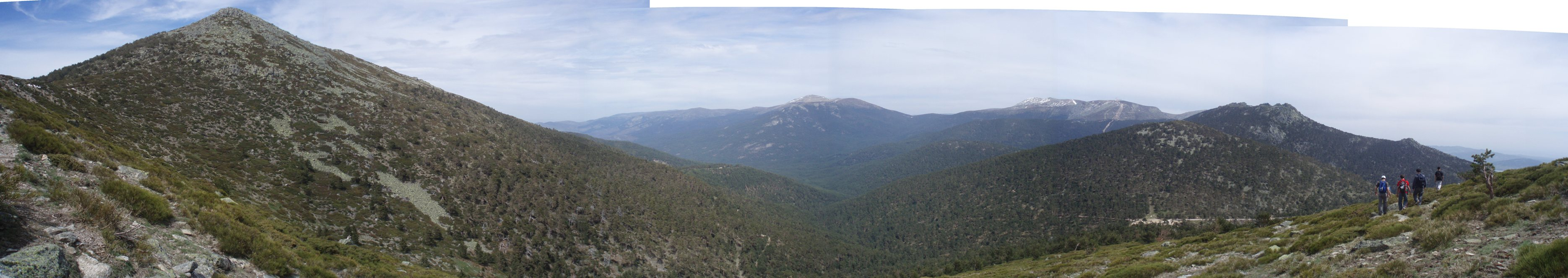
Panoramic view of Valsain Valley with Montón de Trigo on the left.

=== Forest management ===
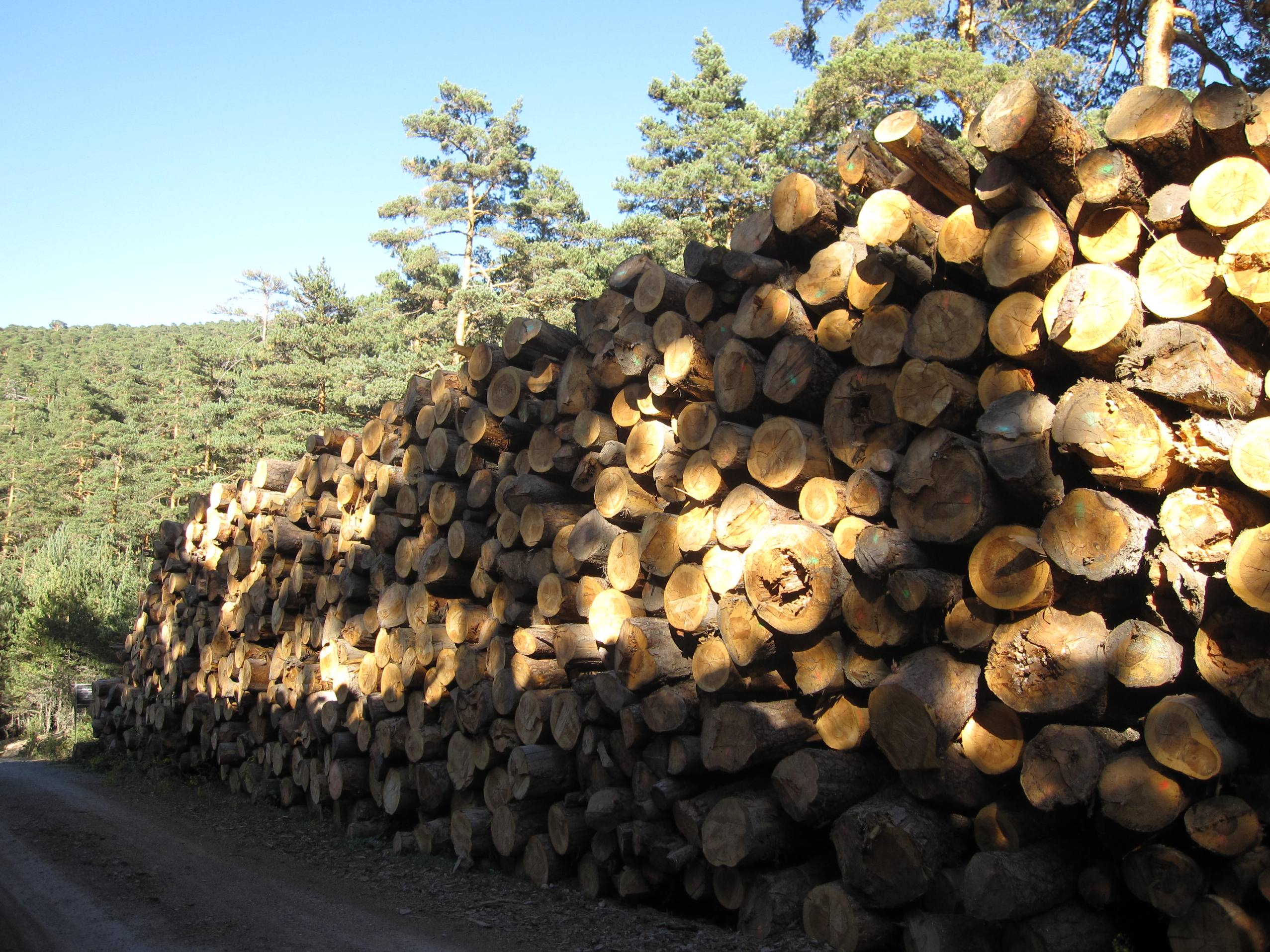
Wood storage in the surroundings of the "siete revueltas" of the CL-601 road.

The Montes y Aserradero de Valsaín organization is responsible of managing the development of the Valsain forests, making their exploitation compatible with the traditional uses and the conservation and improvement of the different habitats in which the different species of fauna and flora develop, thus obeying the dictates of Law 43/2003 on Montes, which states:

Los montes deben ser gestionados de forma sostenible, integrando los aspectos ambientales con las actividades económicas, sociales y culturales con la finalidad de conservar el medio natural al tiempo que generar empleo y colaborar al aumento de la calidad de vida y expectativas del desarrollo de la población.

(Translation: Mountains must be managed in a sustainable manner, integrating environmental aspects with economic, social and cultural activities in order to conserve the natural environment while generating employment and collaborating to increase the quality of life and development expectations of the population.)

To achieve these objectives, the area of the Valsain forests is divided into different zones or quarters, in which lines of action are established depending on their characteristics. This means that there are areas dedicated to forestry exploitation, recreation, grazing or the protection of different species. The main harvesting activity is the logging of Scots pine.

The management of forest resources is established in the following documents:

- 6ª Revisión de la Ordenación del Monte Pinar de Valsaín (period of validity 2000–2009).
- 2ª Rev. de la Ordenación del Monte Matas de Valsaín (period of validity 2004–2019).
- 1ª Rev. de la Ordenación Silvopastoral de los Montes de Valsaín (period of validity 2000–2009).
- IV Plan Cinegético del Coto Montes de Valsaín (period of validity 2006–07 to 2009–10).

==== Sistema de Gestión Forestal Sostenible de los Montes de Valsaín (SGFS) ====
Management is carried out in accordance with five basic documents that involve knowledge of the space to be managed and the long-term and short-term plans (the General Plan and the Special Plan) that determine the planning of environmental measures to act on the different agents such as the fauna, flora, territory, etc. The knowledge of the space to be managed is collected under different points of view or states, these are:

- Legal Status.
- Natural State.
- Inventory Status.
- Forestry Report.

There is a permanent revision and correction of the plans, making comparative revisions with previous inventories and correcting undesired deviations.

The surface of the forests has been divided into 25 different quarters, most of them destined to production, one of the quarters has been left out of the forestry exploitation with the objective of achieving a mature semi-naturalized pine forest surface. In the rest, restrictions are determined depending on their particular characteristics.

The main species exploited is Scots pine, but there are also exploitations of other species. The following table shows the different volumes of wood of each species in each of the forests and their exploitation possibilities:

Species	Stock Monte Matas (m³)	Exploitation potential Monte Matas (m³)	Stock Monte Pinar (m³)	Exploitation potential Monte Pinar (m³)
Scots pine	284.216,00	3.626,25	2.337.974,00	28.748,50
Laricio pine	2.393,00	-	-	-
Oak	56.720,00	-	2.073,00	250,00
Holm oak	3.822,00	-	-	-

With the exception of 50 ha, the main harvestable species in the Pinar Mountain is Scots pine. In the Matas mountain the Pyrenean oak is also harvested.

=== Form of exploitation ===
In the pine forest, thinning is carried out successively by coppicing in order to replace mature trees with younger ones. In the oak grove, the dry and overgrown trees are eliminated.

These activities are limited in terms of the way and time of cutting, in certain areas, for different reasons such as landscaping, non-interference in the awnings and headlands or in the reproduction of protected species. No harvesting is carried out in some areas and within a radius of 100 meters from the nesting areas of the black vulture and imperial eagle. Within a radius of 500 meters, harvesting is done at specific times.

The pines are cut when they are 120 years old. The felling is done by cutting with a chainsaw, then the pines are removed from the forest with different means (horses, tractors or loaders) and are transported and stacked with crane trucks after being measured.

The management is carried out using the Tramo Móvil method. This method divides the barracks into different cantones that are usually delimited by natural disaster areas or roads and in this area the number of trees and their characteristics are inventoried. Depending on the state of maturity of the tree, three sections are assigned:

- Regeneration, when the trees are in the regeneration period. In this section, thinning cuts are made.
- Improvement, when regeneration has been completed. Cutting of the "parent" trees that have been left for seed supply.
- Preparation, when they are close to maturity. Sick and dry trees are cut, preparing the optimum density to achieve, when thinning is carried out, a new regeneration.

One section is always left for thinning, another for protection without cutting and others with only improvement sections.

There are 50 ha in the Revenga quarter where the aim is to achieve an adult mass of holly by thinning the undergrowth of the pine forest formed by holly.

For the development of the different works within the Valsain Mountains there are 50 people working in different areas. There are field workers, administrative workers, sawmill workers, park rangers, guides, environmental agents, technicians... and there are also contracts with companies, both public and private.

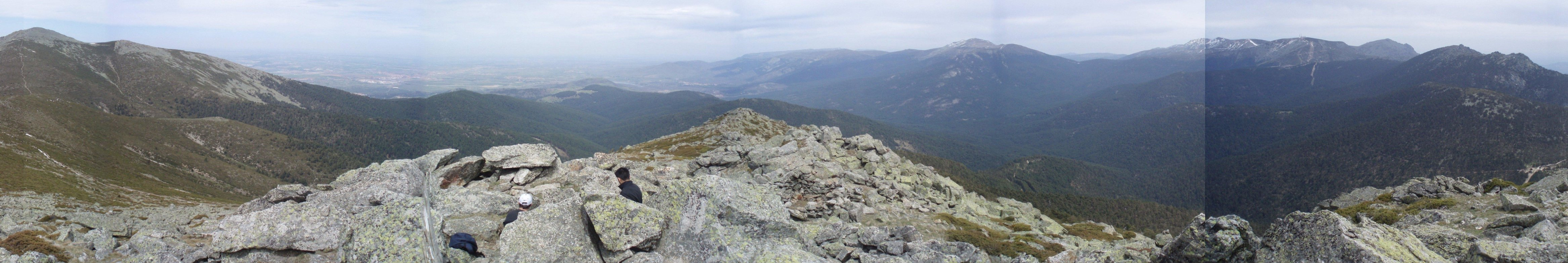
Panoramic view of Valsain valley from the top of Montón de Trigo.

==== El Pinar ====
The felling age of Scots pine is about 120 years. The traditional way of exploiting these forests is to thin the pine forests. In the clearings opened up by the felling of the adult pines, the light index rises, which facilitates the germination of the pine nuts and, thus, a new generation of pines. Over time, the mass of adult trees is replaced by new young pines, completely regenerating the pine forest.

At the beginning, the mass of young pines is very dense and decreases by natural process and by human intervention that performs different cleanings and cuts until reaching the convenient density for an optimal development of the tree.

In areas of special protection, where some endangered species live, no intervention is carried out in order to preserve the structure of the "tree canopy" and not to disturb with the movement of men and machines.

=== The sawmill ===
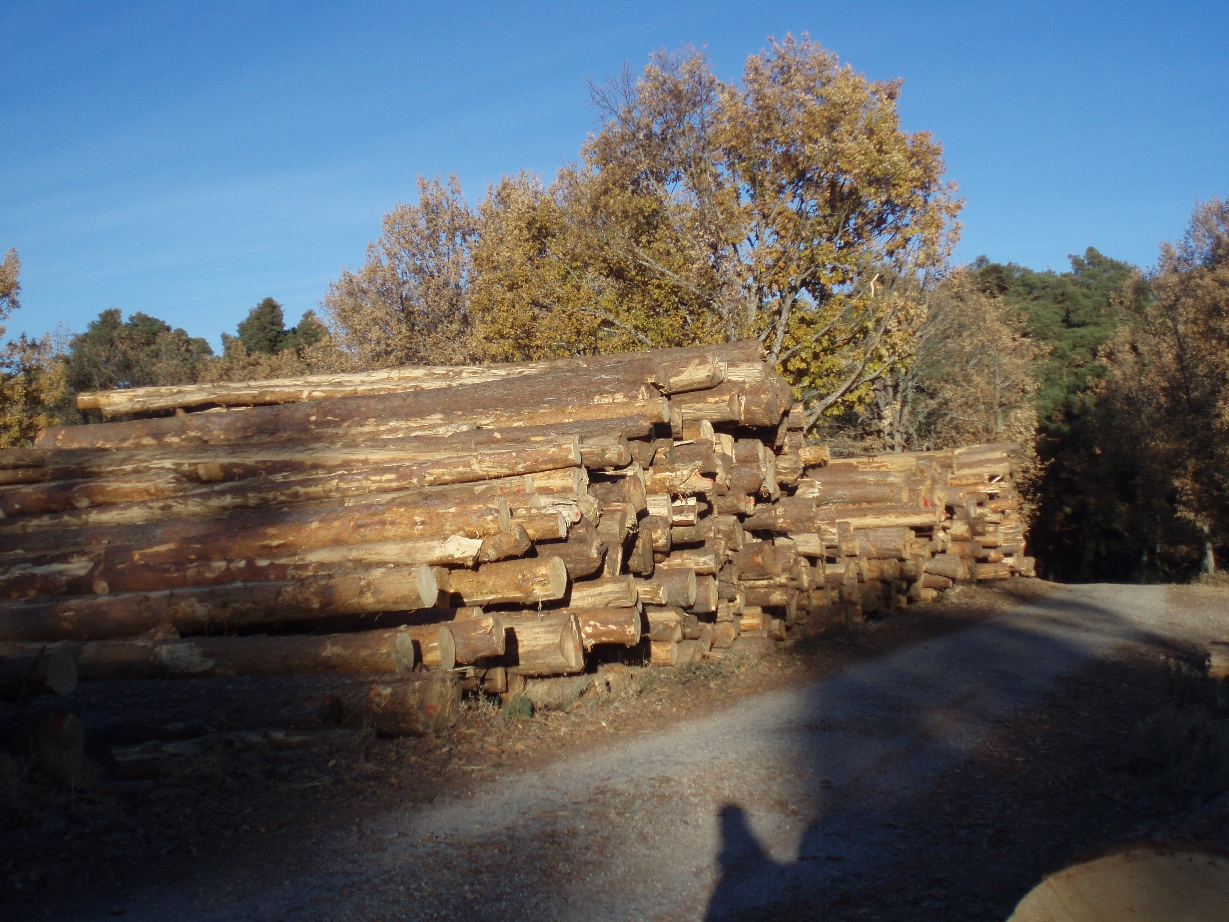
Valsain wood in storage.

The forestry exploitation of the Valsain forests is carried out through El Aserradero ("The Sawmill"). This facility, located in Monte de Matas, next to the town of Valsain and the facilities of the Centro Nacional de Educación Ambiental, occupies an area of 12 ha.

It was created in 1884 by the Royal House. In its beginnings the motive power was based on steam. The ownership of the sawmill followed the same fate as the forests. When, in 1945, the mountains became part of the Patrimonio Nacional, the sawmill also became part of the Patrimonio Nacional. On July 16, 1982, it came under the control of the Instituto Nacional para la Conservación de la Naturaleza (ICONA).

In 1952, the facilities were enlarged and modernized, and were equipped with a head, a splitting machine, a pendulum saw and a galley. In 1985, the last reform was carried out in which the facilities were updated with modern machinery and automation.

On October 1, 2005, it was affected by a fire that brought production to a standstill. The flames affected the machinery and the warehouse. In 2007, sawmilling operations were resumed with a mobile sawmill carriage and the reconstruction work continued, taking advantage of the same to equip the sawmill with the most modern lumber production technology.

The production is marketed under the brand name Maderas de Valsaín ("Valsain Woods") and is adapted to market requirements.

Sustainable forest management system certificates have been obtained. The FSC (SW-FM/COC-1441) was obtained in February 2005, issued by FSC Spain, and includes the chain of custody for the wood processed by the sawmill. And the PEFC (PEFC/14-23-00008) in November 2004, issued by PEFC España.

There are plans to build a Wood Museum at the sawmill facilities, which would occupy the former facilities of the Real Taller de Aserrío Mecánico.

== History ==
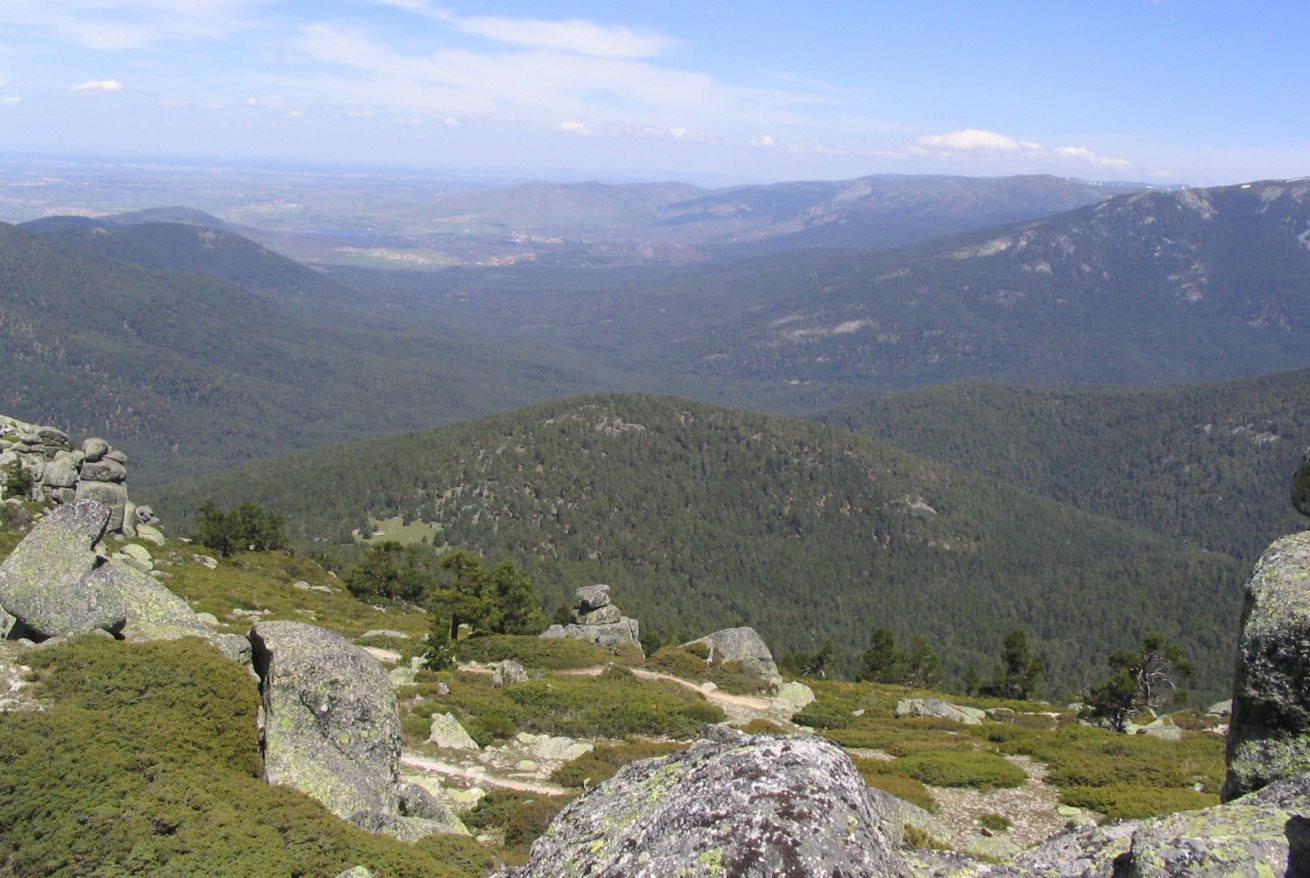
Valsain Valley seen from the top of Siete Picos.

Historically, the Valsain Mountains belonged to the city of Segovia and were managed by the Noble Junta de Linajes y al Común de su Tierra. In 1579, hunting and fishing were prohibited in these areas, making them the first protected natural space.

In 1761, the hunting richness of these areas led King Carlos III to acquire them for use as a hunting reserve. Between December 9 of 1869—date on which the ley de desvinculación y venta de bienes de la Corona ("law of dissociation and sale of Crown propert") was enacted—and the Law of June 1876, the mountains were in private hands. Their return to the Crown was not complete, leaving the Matas Pirón, Mata de la Saúca and Navalosar in private hands.

With the arrival of the Second Spanish Republic, they ceased to be the property of the Crown and became part of the State patrimony.

In 1940 they became the property of Patrimonio Nacional and in 1982, by means of Law 23 of June 16, regulating the assets of Patrimonio Nacional, they were transferred to ICONA which, with its disappearance in 1985, became part of the National Parks Autonomous Agency (OAPN) until the present day.

The first attempt to protect the environment took place in 1920 when an attempt was made to declare the entire Sierra de Guadarrama and the Valsain Mountains a national park. This attempt failed. Later, in 1930 three small areas were protected as Sitios Naturales de Interés Nacional, one of which was the Pinar de La Acebeda.

In 1988, it was declared SPA, Special Protection Area, given the importance and uniqueness of the bird wealth with more than 100 nesting species and was included in the Natura 2000 Network of protected areas of the European Union in 1995, according to their conditions of SPA and SCI. The proposal for the declaration of Site of Community Importance (SCI) was made in 1998.

It is included in the Plan de Espacios Naturales Protegidos de Castilla y León since 2003.

== Environmental provisions ==
- Special Protection Area (SPA).
- Sitio Natural de Interés Nacional del Pinar de la Acebeda ("Natural Site of National Interest of the Acebeda Pine Forest") located on 587 ha of the Valsain Pine Forest (declared in 1930).
- Critical Area SG -3 for the purposes of the Plan de Recuperación del Águila Imperial Ibérica en Castilla y León.

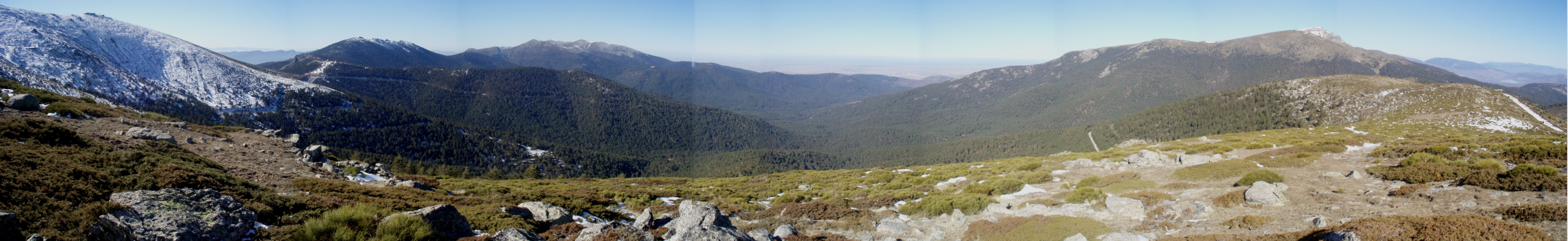
Panoramic view of Valsain Valley seen from Loma del Noruego.

== See also ==
- Sistema Central
- Valsain Valley
- La Mujer Muerta
- Sierra de Guadarrama
- Montón de Trigo
