= Valsain Valley =

Valley in Segovia (Spain)

- Valle de Valsaín
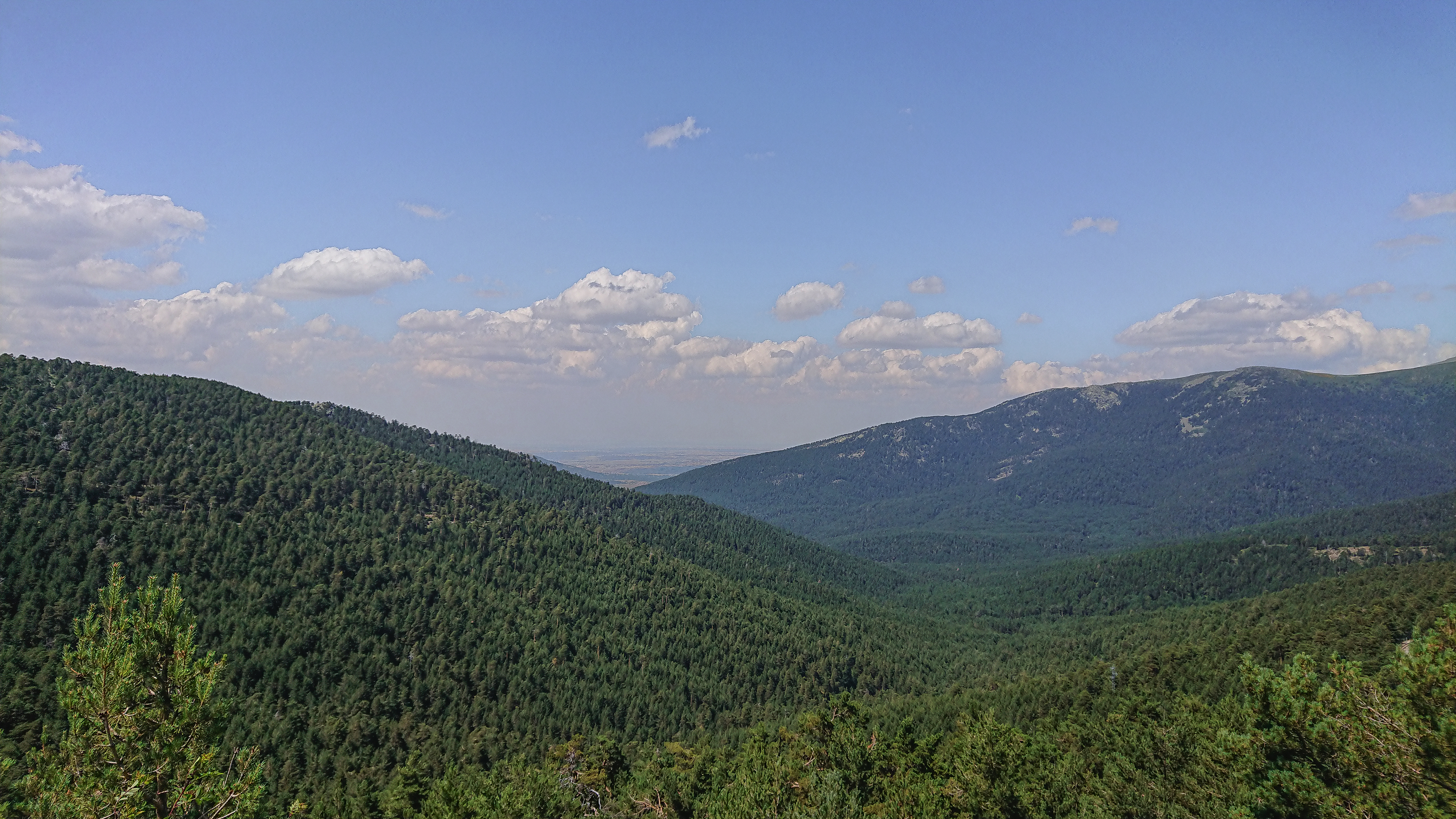
- View of the valley from Puerto de Navacerrada.
- Length: 9 kilometres (5.6 mi)
- Width: 6 kilometres (3.7 mi)

Geography
- Location: Castile and León
- Coordinates: 40°49′23″N 4°01′02″W
- Rivers: Eresma River
- Interactive map of Valsain Valley

Valsain Valley (Spanish: Valle de Valsaín) is a valley of the northern slope of the Guadarrama mountain range (Sistema central mountain range). It is located in the southeastern part of the province of Segovia (Castilla y León, Spain), within the municipality of Real Sitio de San Ildefonso, and borders the Community of Madrid. The valley is covered by an extensive pine forest known as el Pinar, the largest in the mountains and one of the best preserved in Spain.

== Geography ==
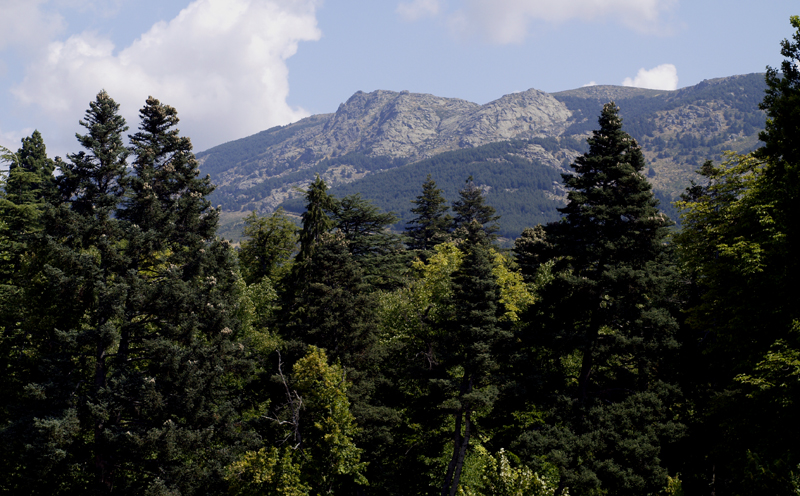
Mixed coniferous forest with some fir trees introduced in Valsain Valley.

Oriented from south to north, it has an average width of 6 km and an approximate length of 9 km, which makes it one of the largest valleys of the Sierra de Guadarrama, along with the Lozoya Valley. It is almost entirely covered by a forest of pinus sylvestris (Scots pine), the most extensive of the Sierra de Guadarrama and one of the most important of it. Below 1200 meters of altitude, there are also specimens of oak and chestnut. Above 2000 meters, the pine forest gives way to alpine meadows and rocky areas.

The lower part of the valley has an altitude ranging from 1100 to 1500 meters. At the bottom of the valley, the Eresma River runs in its highest stretch of its course. There are numerous natural pools and swimming pools along its course through the valley. Near these pools there are recreational areas with picnic areas and parking, such as "Los Asientos" and "Boca del Asno". These areas are accessed by the regional road CL-601, which connects Segovia with Collado Villalba.

At the northern end of the valley, and in the lowest area, is the town of Valsain, belonging to the municipality of Real Sitio de San Ildefonso, which takes its name from the valley. At the eastern end is the Peñalara massif (2430 meters), in the south is the Puerto de Cotos pass, the Bola del Mundo peak, the Navacerrada Pass and the Siete Picos. In the west is the mountain range of La Mujer Muerta.

== El Pinar ==
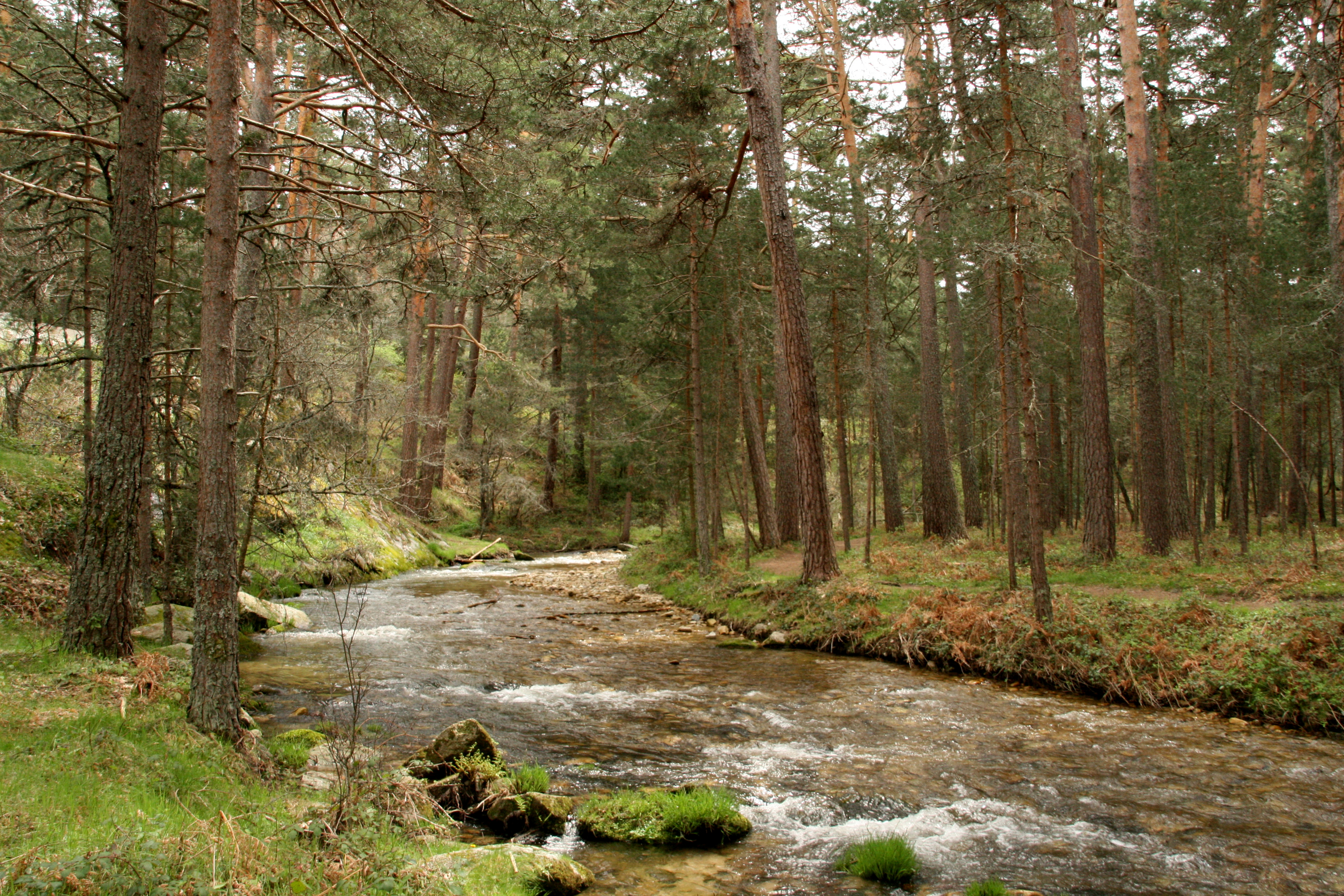
Eresma River, in its course through el Pinar (the pine forest).

"El Pinar" (or Valsain pine forest) is one of the best preserved mature pine forests in Spain. The explanation for this excellent state of conservation lies in its origin as a hunting reserve of the Spanish monarchy and the subsequent sustainable use by the timber industry.

=== History ===
Charles III (1716–1788) bought a large extension of this mountain range comprising the Valsain Mountains, Riofrío and la mata del Pirón for his deer hunting practices.

Logging in the forests of Valsain follows a sustainable dynamic to this day. The form of exploitation of the forests is that promoted by Agustín Pascual González (1818–1884), inspector of the Royal Forests pioneer of forest engineering in Spain, precursor of the rational management of natural resources.

The timber exploitation is linked to the sawmill, the Real Aserrío de Valsaín, which began its activity under the patronage of the Royalty in the year 1884. The cutting age of Scots pine is about 120 years. The traditional way of exploiting these forests is to thin the pine forests. In the clearings opened by the cutting of the adult pines, the light index rises, which facilitates the germination of the pine nuts and, thus, a new generation of pines. Over time, the mass of adult trees is replaced by new young pines, completely regenerating the pine forest. At the beginning, the mass of young pines is very dense and decreases by natural process and by human intervention—through performing different cleanings and cuts until reaching the convenient density for an optimal development of the tree.

All the obtained wood must pass quality controls, to be later commercialized with the exclusive seal of "Maderas de Valsaín" ("Valsain Wood"). The Real Aserrío de Valsaín has recently been declared an Bien de Interés Cultural (BIC) in the category of "Monument".

=== Flora ===
The complete catalog of the vascular flora of Valsain pine forest amounts to 867 taxa (species and subspecies). 69 introduced species must be added to this number—in most cases linked to urban environments.

In these mountains, there is a wide diversity of natural habitats, ranging from the oak groves at the bottom of the valley to the grasslands on the summits, passing through the pine forests that occupy most of the territory, the rocky outcrops, the peat bogs, the banks of rivers and streams, the holly oak groves, etc. This diversity allows the coexistence in the same valley of high mountain plant species and species typical of the Mediterranean scrubland; the fauna also takes advantage of the different environments according to the seasons.

Scots pine is the most widespread plant formation in the valley. It occupies from 1200 meters to 2000 meters above forest level. At altitudes below 1400 meters it occasionally presents an undergrowth of pyrenean oak. The Scots pine can reach average heights of 25 meters and in good locations exceeds 30 meters in height, occasionally reaching over 40 meters. In sunny areas the heights, crown volumes and slenderness are lower than in shady areas. The accompanying undergrowth is mainly composed of Genista florida (white broom), Juniperus communis (common juniper), Cytisus oromediterraneus (pyrenean broom), and Rubus sp. (brambles), in the open clearings in the middle of the pine forest. In the upper parts the undergrowth, there is jabino, piorno, cambrón or cambroño (Adenocarpus hispanicus) and blueberry (Vaccinium myrtillus), while in the lower parts there are honeysuckles (Lonicera peryclimenum, L. xylosteum), rowan trees (Sorbus aucuparia), hawthorns (Crataegus monogyna), blackthorns (Prunus spinosa), cherry trees (Prunus avium) and holly trees (Ilex aquifolium).

=== Protection ===
Valsain pine forest contain the largest number of protection figures that a natural area in Spain can contemplate, since 3,326 hectares of them belong to the Sierra de Guadarrama National Park, the remaining 7,011 hectares belong to a figure of their own called Área de Especial Protección del Parque Nacional (English: Special Protection Area of the National Park), created ad hoc to be able to make commercial forest management compatible. These are Special Protection Area (SPA) and Site of Community Importance (SCI) due to the natural values it treasures. They are also a Critical Area of the Imperial Eagle (Sg-3) due to the three pairs of this bird of prey that breed there, hold the Sitio Natural de Interés Nacional del Pinar de la Acebeda (English: Natural Site of National Interest of El Pinar de la Acebeda), and are within the recently declared Nature reserve of Real Sitio de San Ildefonso-El Espinar.

El Pinar is currently in good health, having obtained two environmental certifications: FSC in February 2005 and PEFC in November 2004.

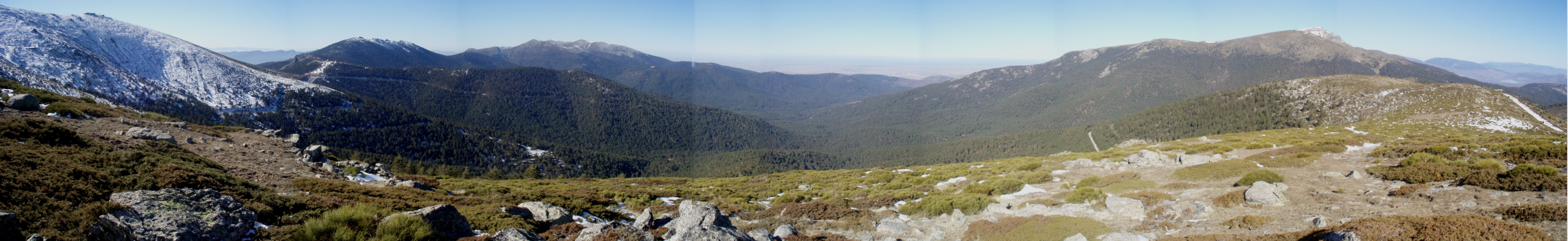
Panoramic view of Valsain Valley seen from Loma del Noruego.

== Gallery ==
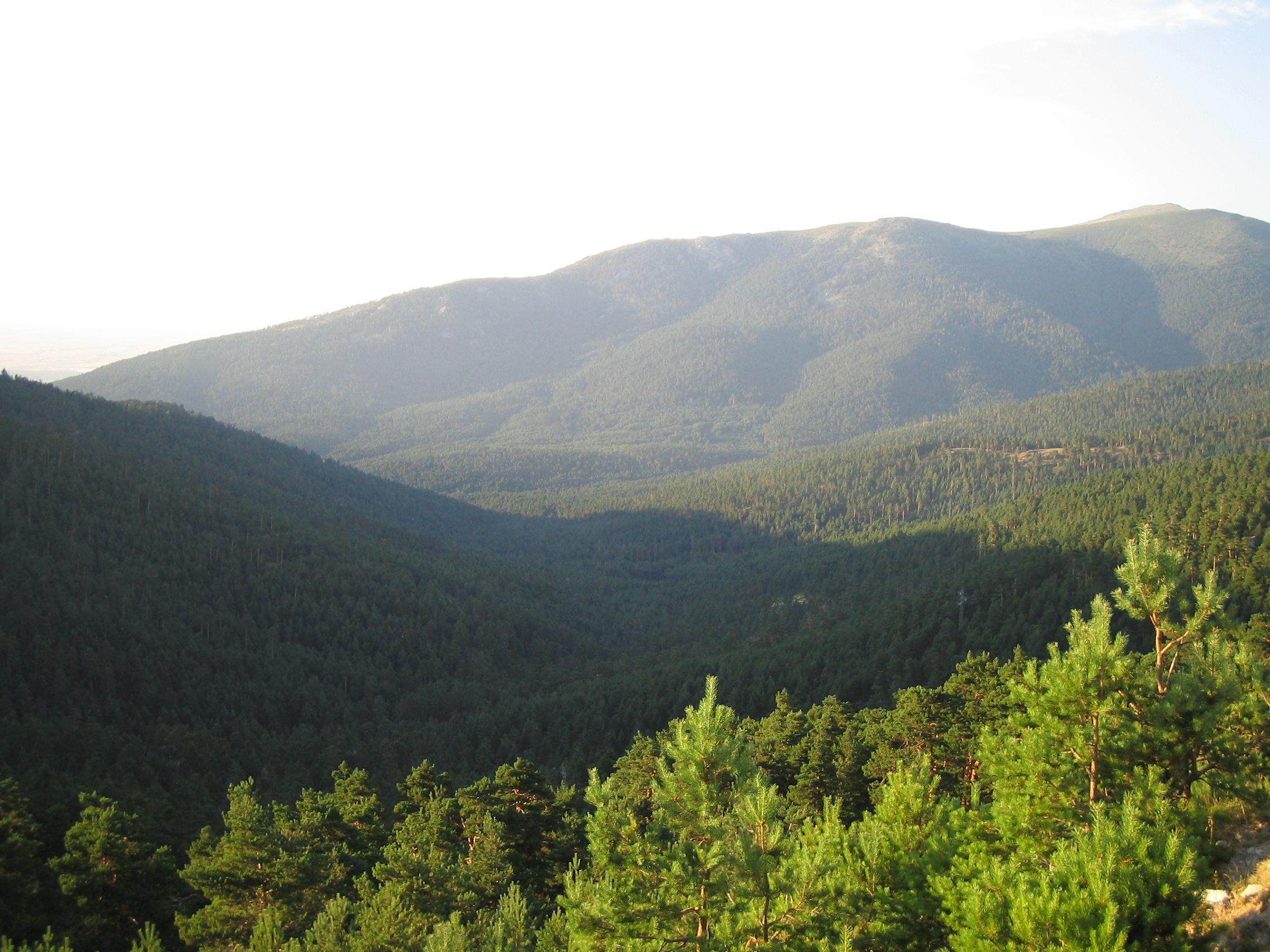
Valsaín Valley

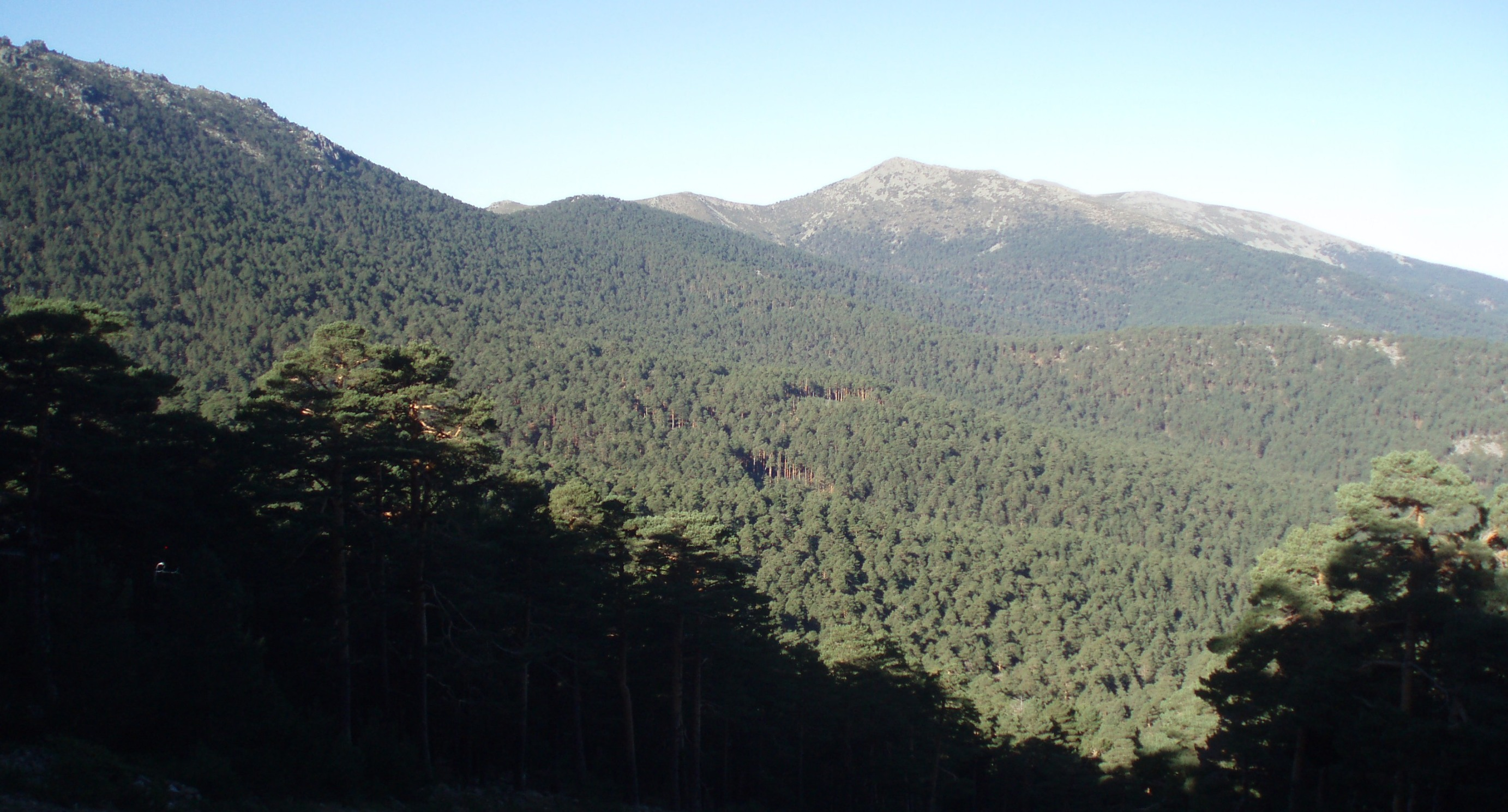
Valsaín Valley with the Siete Picos peak in the upper left and Montón de Trigo peak in the center

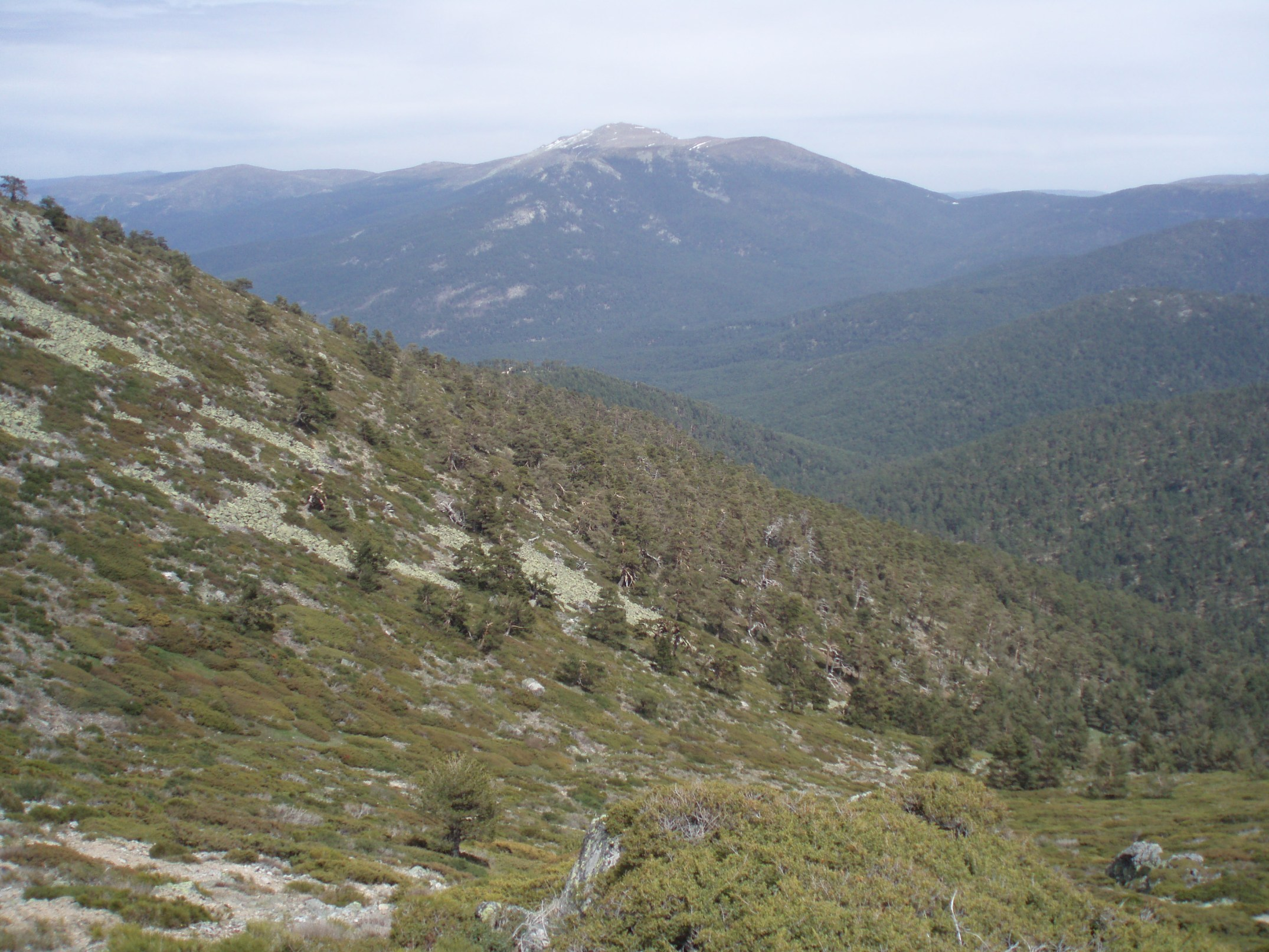
Valsaín Valley with Peñalara behind

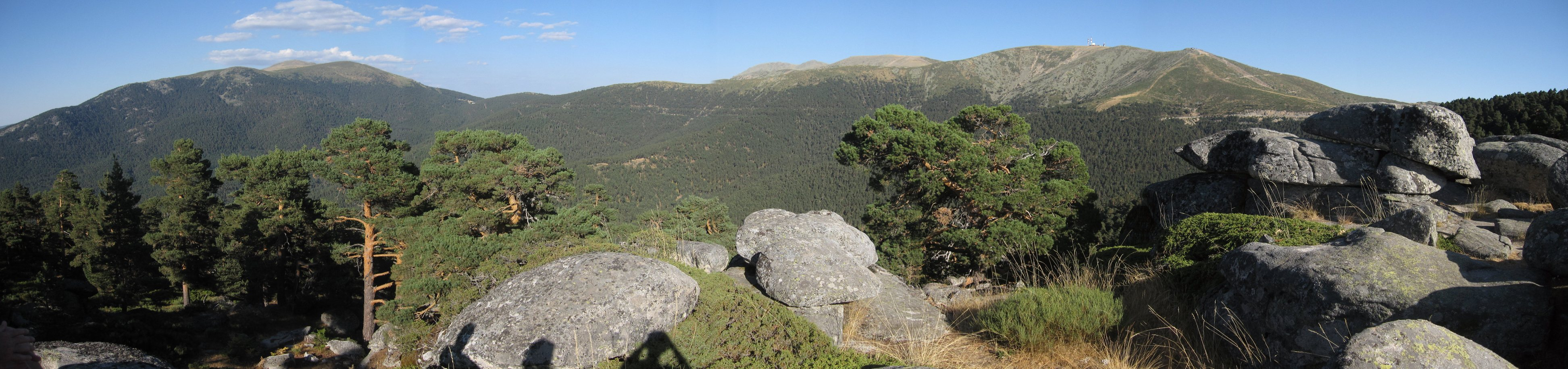
Peñalara and the north face of Cuerda Larga seen from the viewpoint of La Gallarza
