= Montón de Trigo =

Mountain in Sierra de Guadarrama, Spain

Coordinates: 40°48′00″N 4°04′16″W

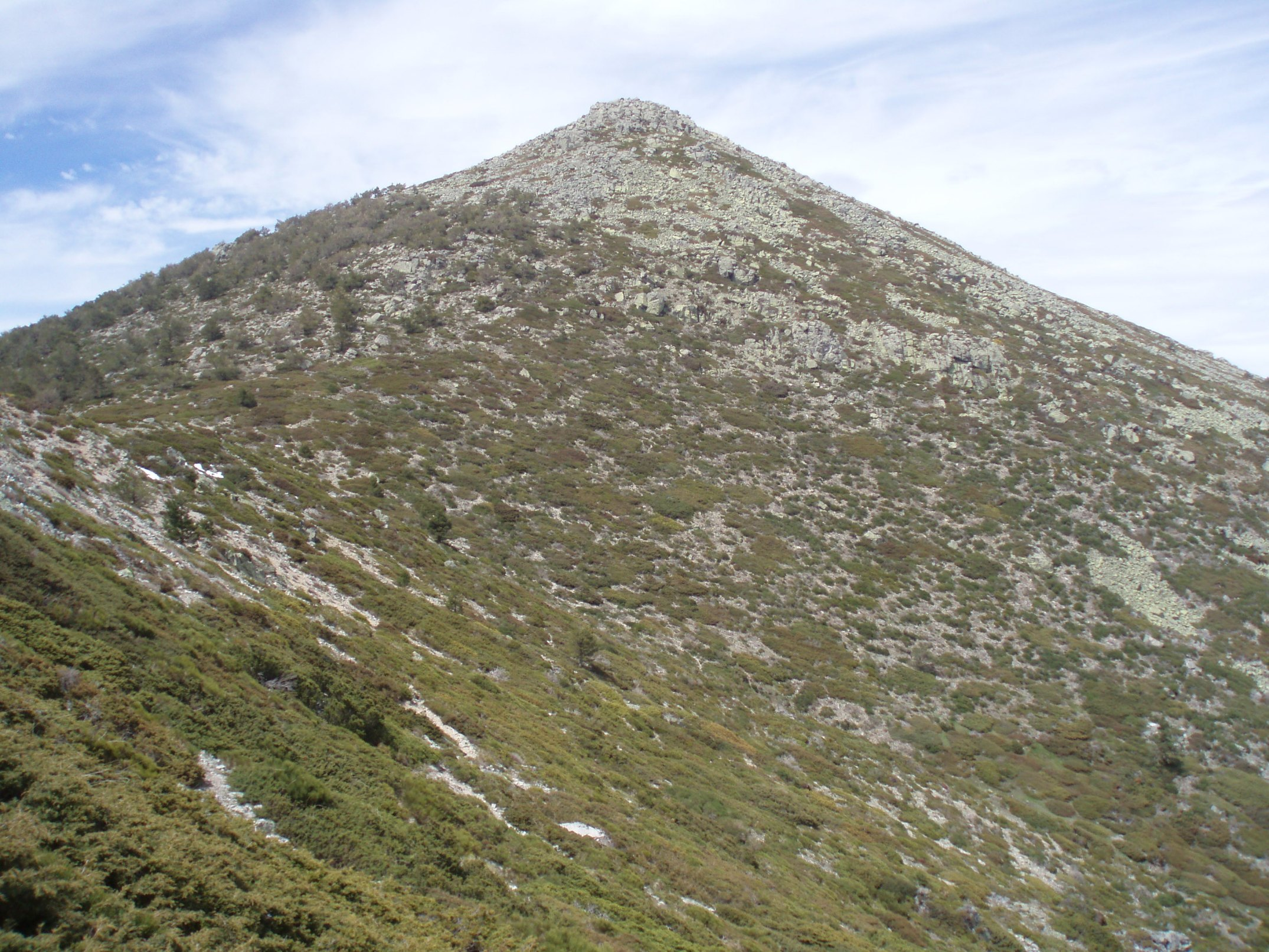
- Southern slope of Montón de Trigo as seen from Cerro Minguete. The mountain, seen from the north or from the south, has a shape that alludes to its name.

Highest point
- Elevation: 2,161 m (7,090 ft)
- Prominence: 177 m (581 ft)

Geography
- Location: Sistema Central
- Parent range: Sistema Central

Climbing
- Easiest route: From the southern slope, from the Fuenfría pass

Montón de Trigo is one of the most important and highest mountains of the Sierra de Guadarrama (mountain range belonging to the Sistema Central) and of the mountainous branch of La Mujer Muerta, located between the valleys of the Moros river to the west and the Eresma river to the east. Administratively, it is within the municipality of El Espinar, in the south of the province of Segovia (Spain).

== Description ==
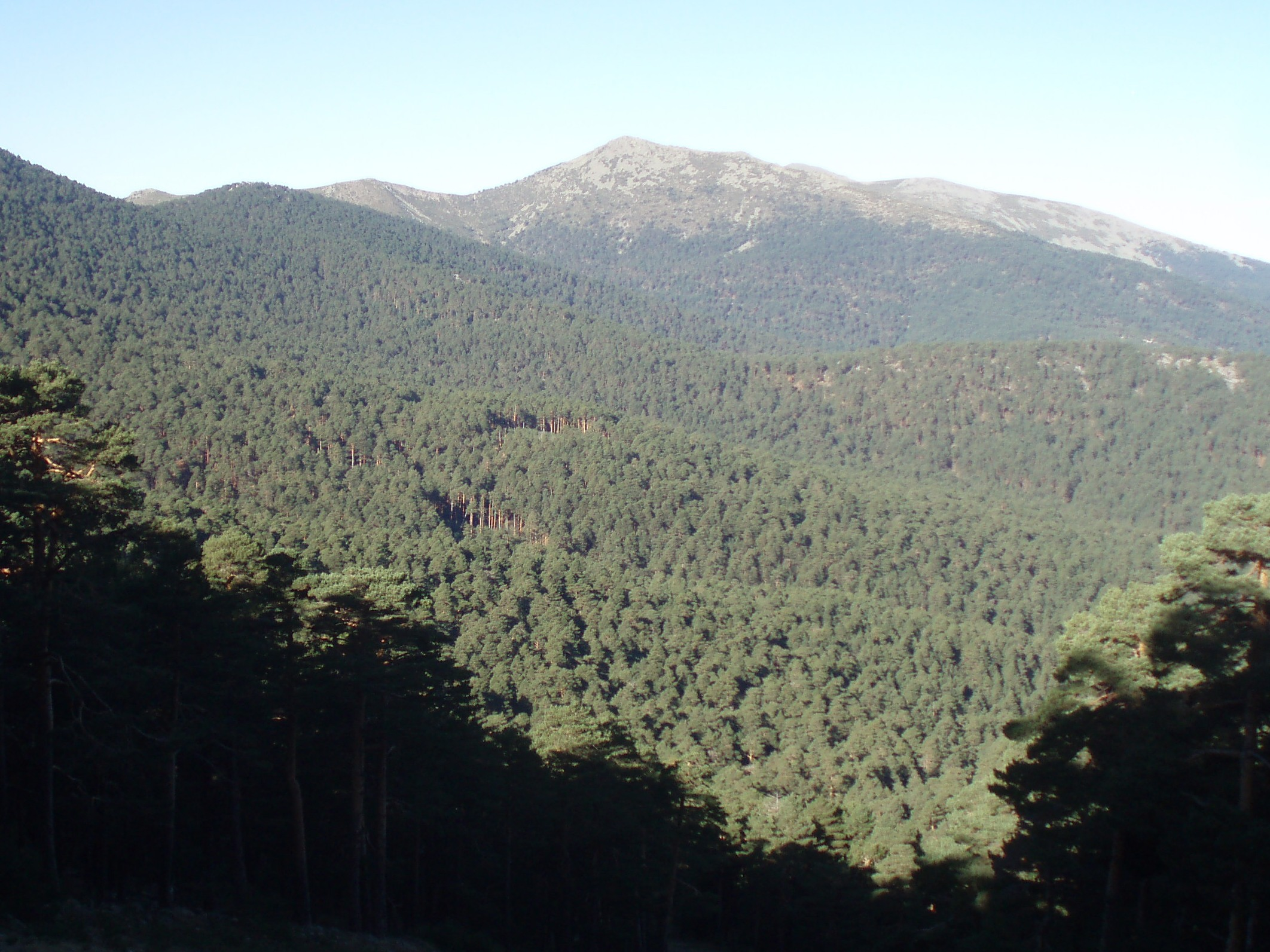
East side of Montón de Trigo.

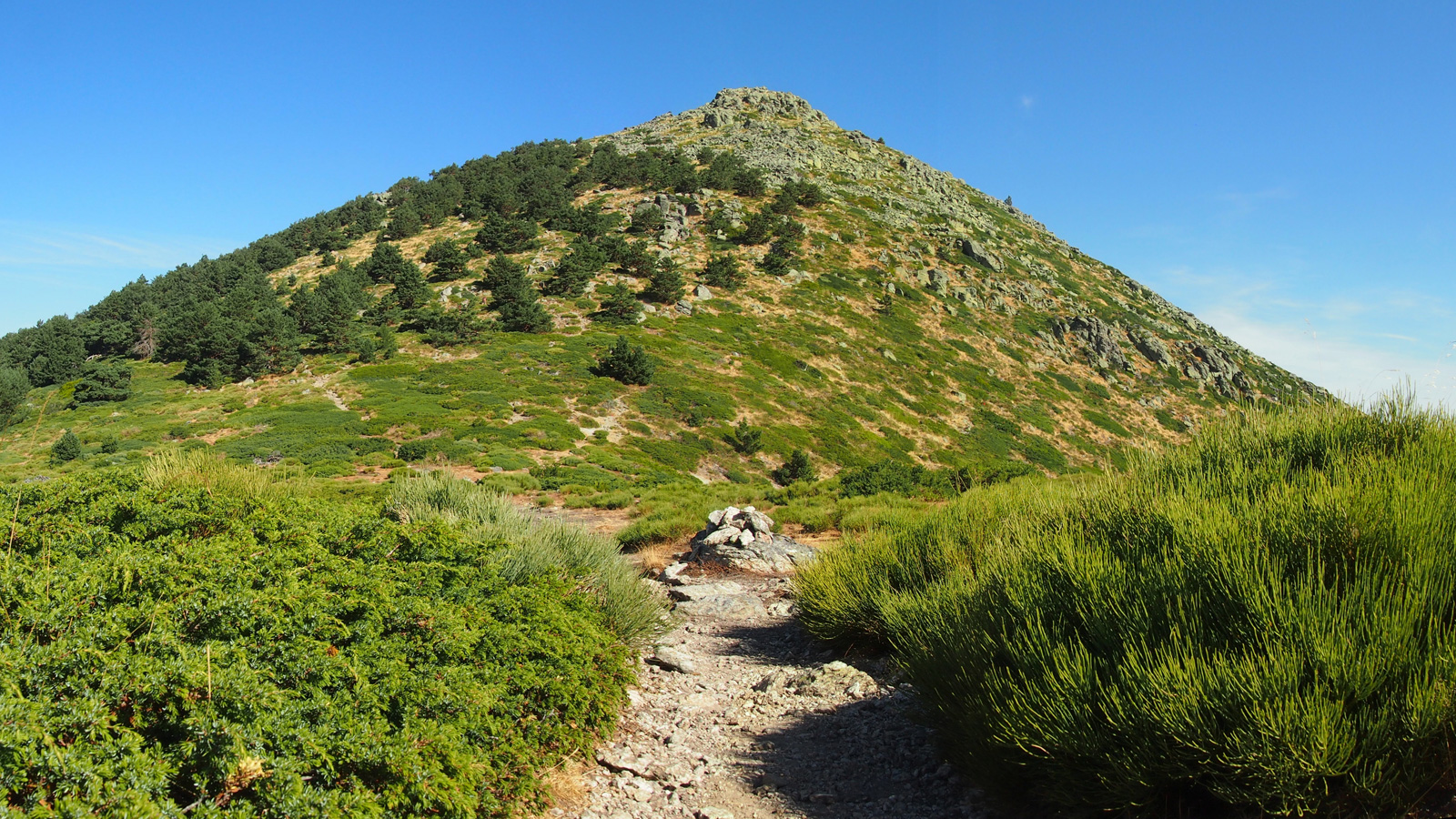
Montón de Trigo seen from Collado Minguete.

It has an altitude of 2161 meters and a prominence of about 177 meters.

The silhouette of the peak, if viewed from the south, alludes to the name, as it resembles a traditional wheat heap, with a conical shape. Its slopes are covered by a thick Scots pine forest, which reaches up to 2000 meters above sea level. From that altitude, alpine meadows, high mountain shrubs and rocky areas can be seen.

The common access is through its southern slope. The climb begins on a path that leaves from the Fuenfría pass heading west along the eastern slope of Cerro Minguete. From there, it is possible to contemplate a view of the Castilian-Leonese and Madrid plains.

== Sierra del Ave (Valencia) ==
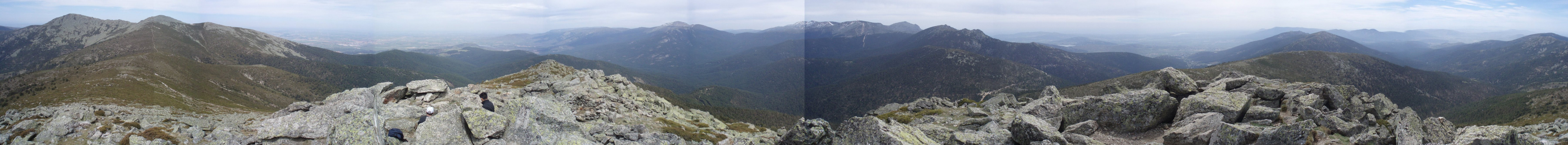
360° panoramic view from the top of Montón de Trigo.

There is also a peak with this name (Montón de Trigo) in the municipality of Llombai (Valencia province), with the difference that it is not a granitic relief but calcareous.

== Research ==
Montón de Trigo has been studied because it is an important source of knowledge about the past civilization that inhabited this place. In 2023, campaigns proposed research on the cultural heritage found in this site. This archaeological project was supported by the City Council of Los Yébenes, since Montón de Trigo is a Bronze Age site located in the territory of this council. The research will be conducted under the supervision of PhD Arturo Ruiz Taboada and his team, with the participation of students from the Universidad Complutense de Madrid.

== See also ==
- Sierra de Guadarrama National Park
- La Mujer Muerta
