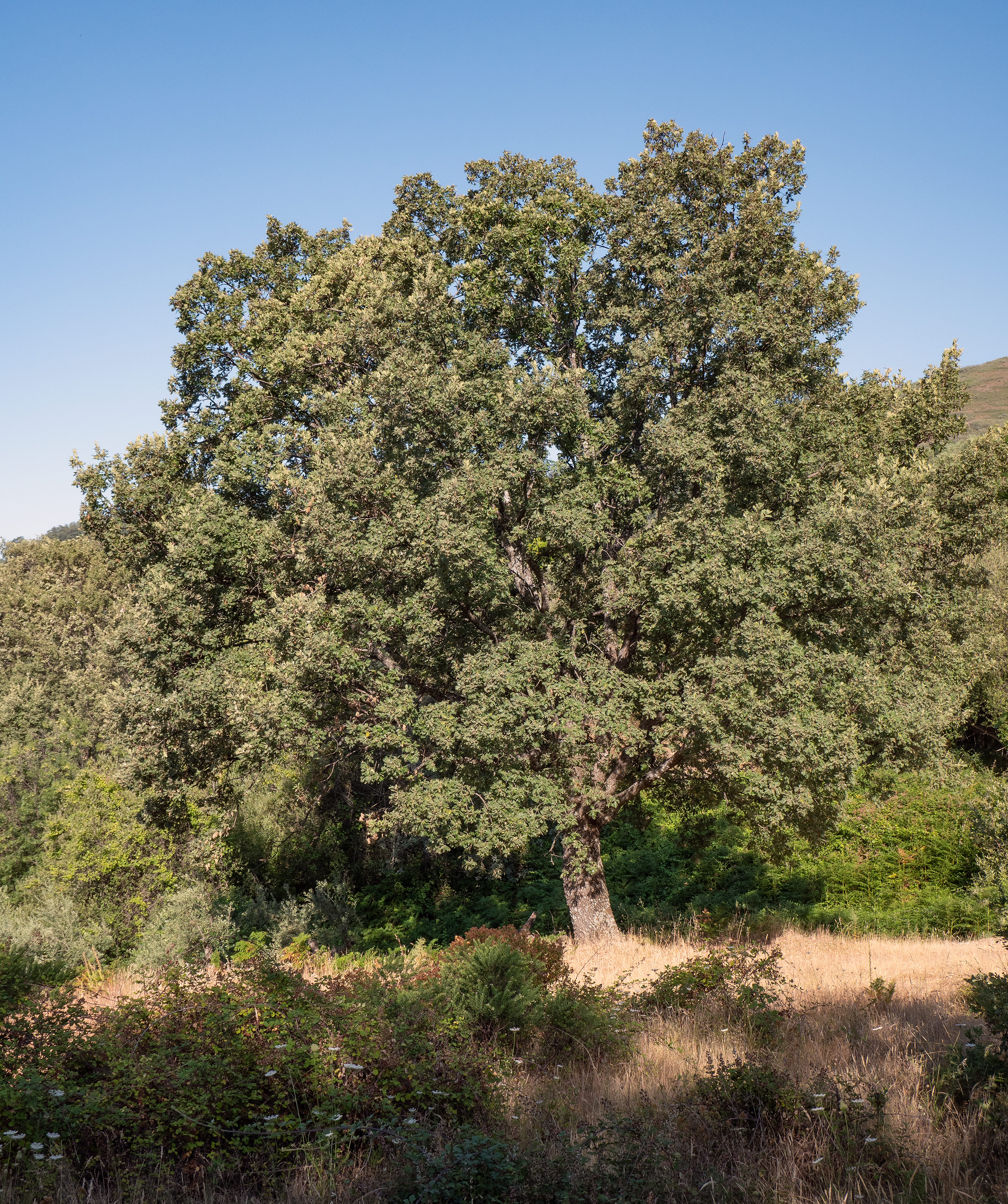

Conservation status
- Least Concern (IUCN 3.1)

Scientific classification
- Kingdom: Plantae
- Clade: Embryophytes
- Clade: Tracheophytes
- Clade: Spermatophytes
- Clade: Angiosperms
- Clade: Eudicots
- Clade: Rosids
- Order: Fagales
- Family: Fagaceae
- Genus: Quercus
- Subgenus: Quercus subg. Quercus
- Section: Quercus sect. Quercus
- Species: Q. pyrenaica

Binomial name
- Quercus pyrenaica Willd.
- Distribution map

Synonyms
- List: Quercus aurin Bosc; Quercus brossa Bosc; Quercus camata Petz. & G.Kirchn.; Quercus castellana Bosc ex Pers.; Quercus cenomanensis Desf. ex Endl.; Quercus cerris DC.; Quercus humilis A.DC.; Quercus lanuginosa subsp. palensis (Palassou) A.Camus; Quercus palensis Palassou; Quercus pubescens subsp. palensis (Palassou) O.Schwarz; Quercus stolonifera Lapeyr.; Quercus tauza Desf.; Quercus tauzin Pers.; Quercus tauzinii Bubani; Quercus toza Bastard

= Quercus pyrenaica =

Pyrenean oak

Species of oak tree

Quercus pyrenaica, also known as Pyrenean oak, or Spanish oak is a tree native to southwestern Europe and northwestern North Africa. Despite its common name, it is rarely found in the Pyrenees Mountains and is more abundant in northern Portugal and north and northwestern Spain.

It is placed in section Quercus.

The oak is cultivated as an ornamental tree for gardens and parks.

== Description ==
Quercus pyrenaica is a tall deciduous tree, often marcescent in immature individuals, up to 25 metres (80 feet) tall, though it is sometimes found as a bush or small tree. It has an average lifespan of 300 years. The leaves have short petioles and are deeply and irregularly lobed, with four to eight pairs of lobes per leaf. There are stellate hairs on both sides of the leaf. Roots frequently produce suckers. The species has high resprouting capabilities.

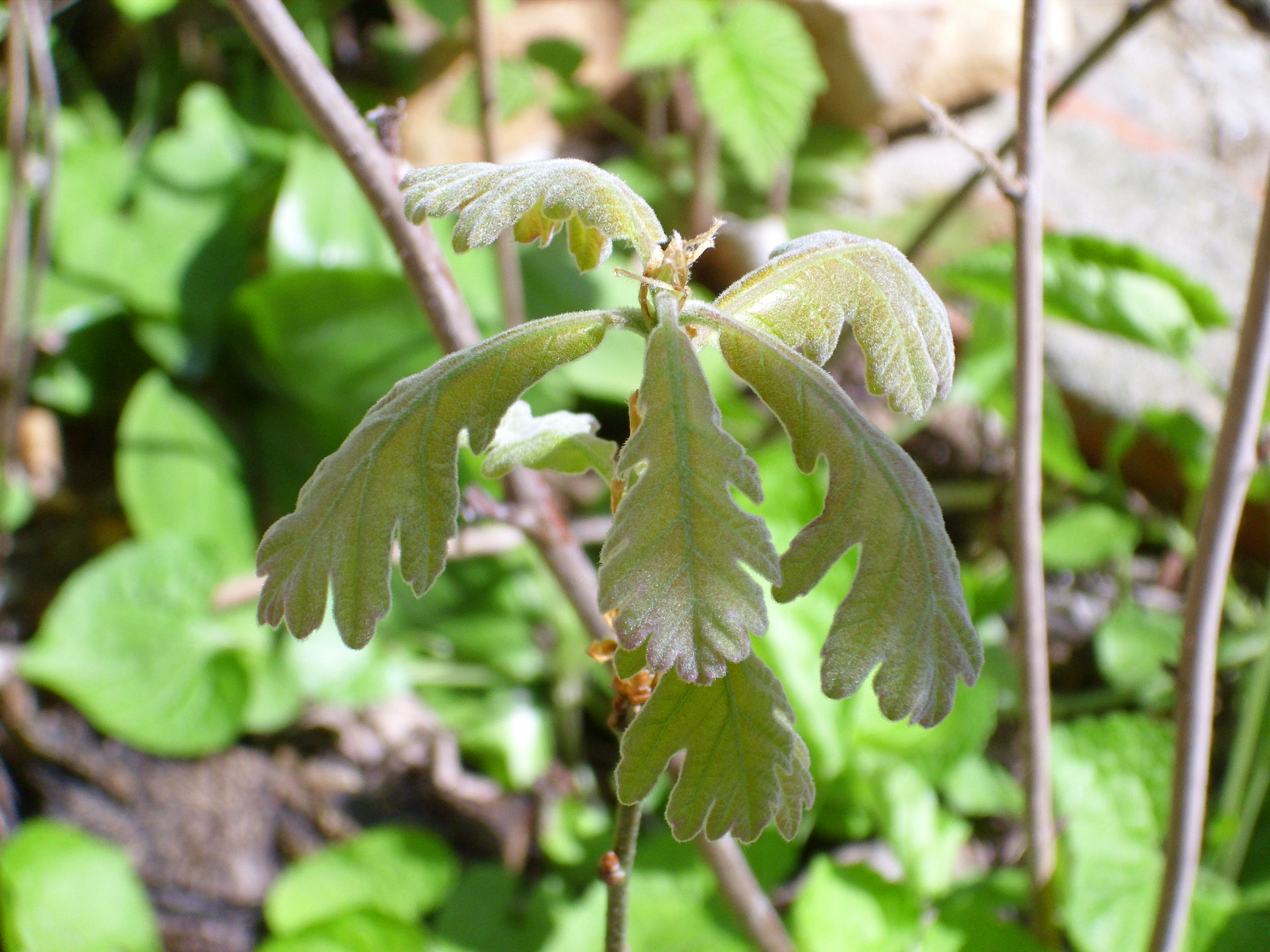
Seedling

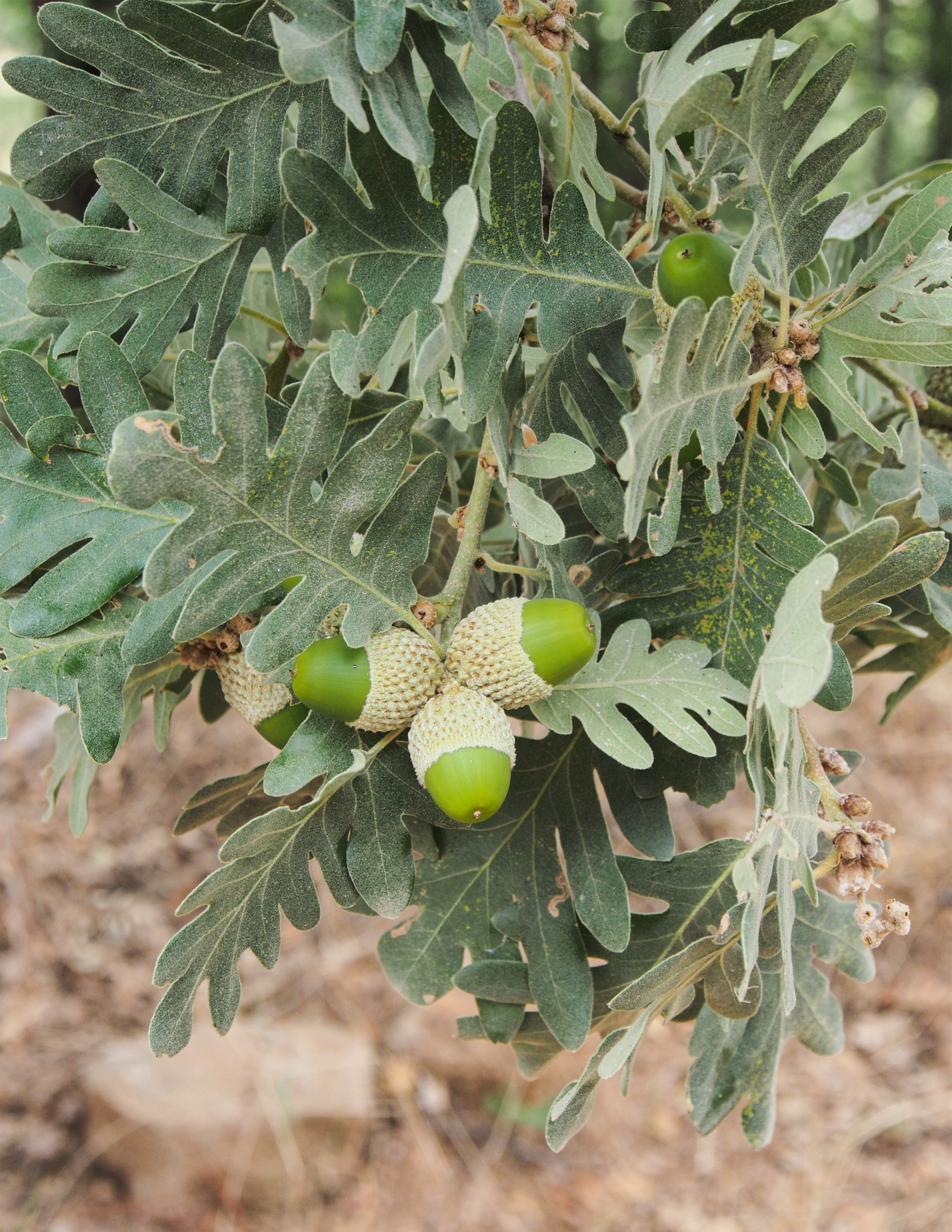
Leaves and acorns

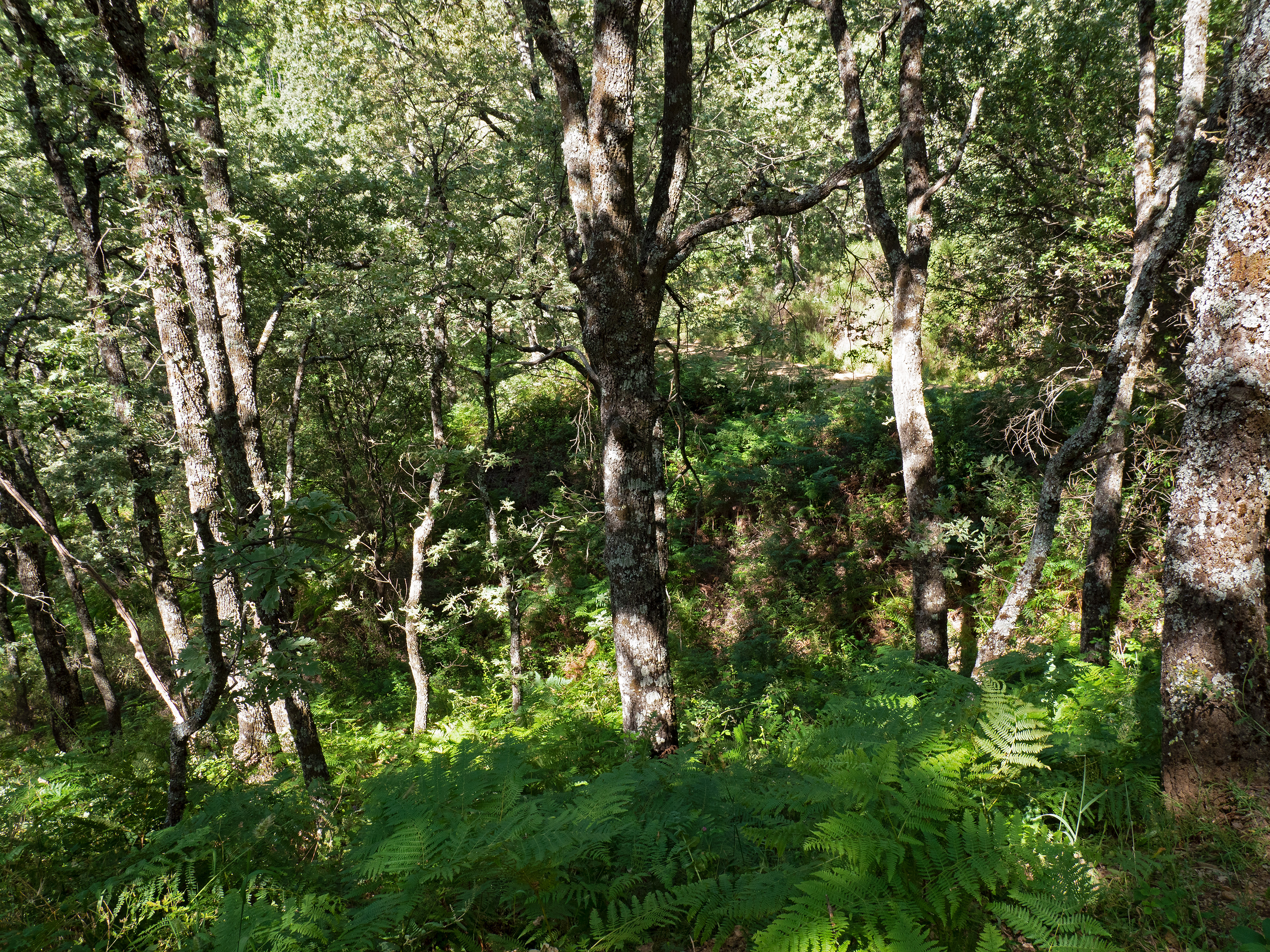
Habitat

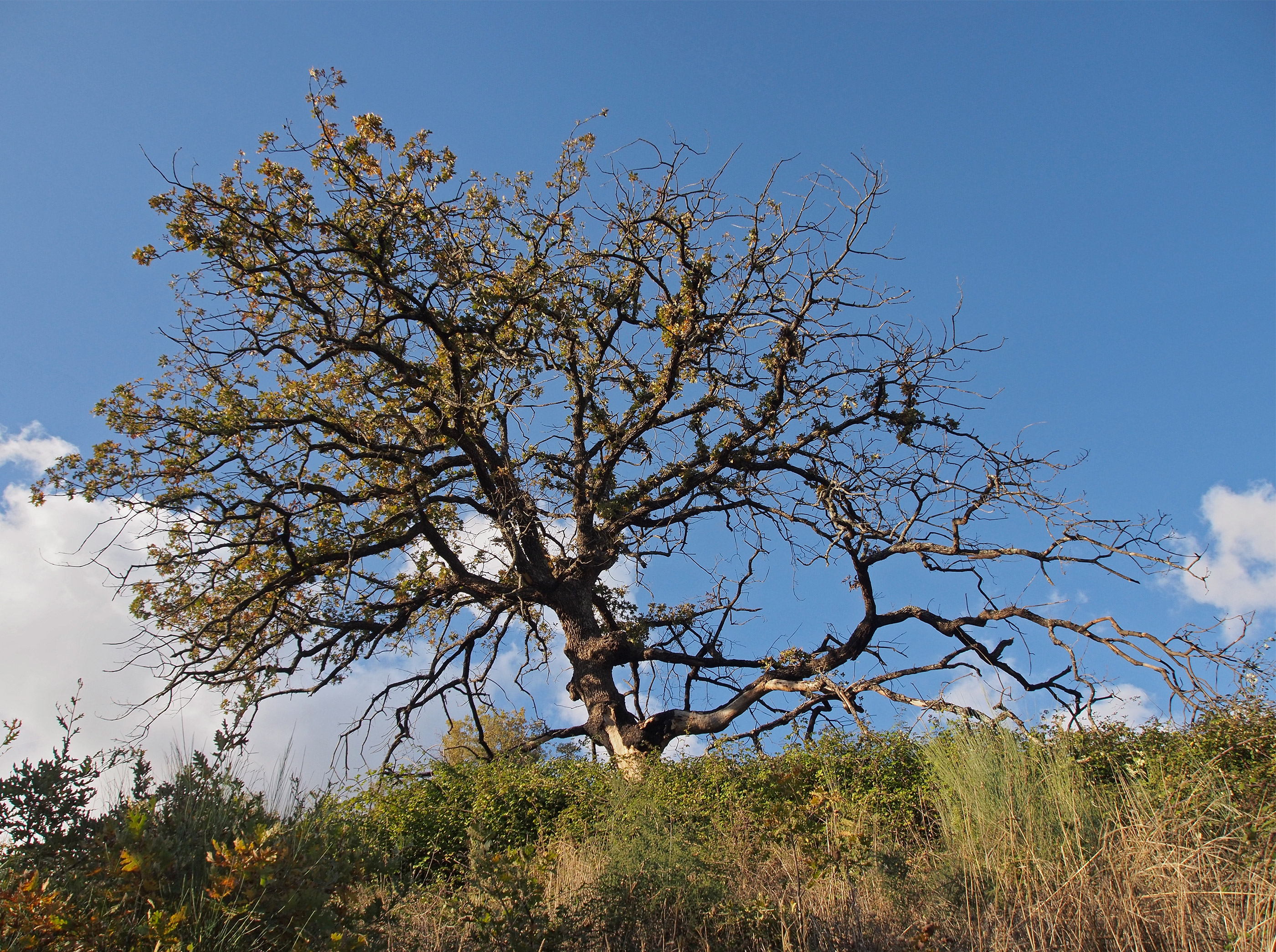
Quercus pyrenaica in winter

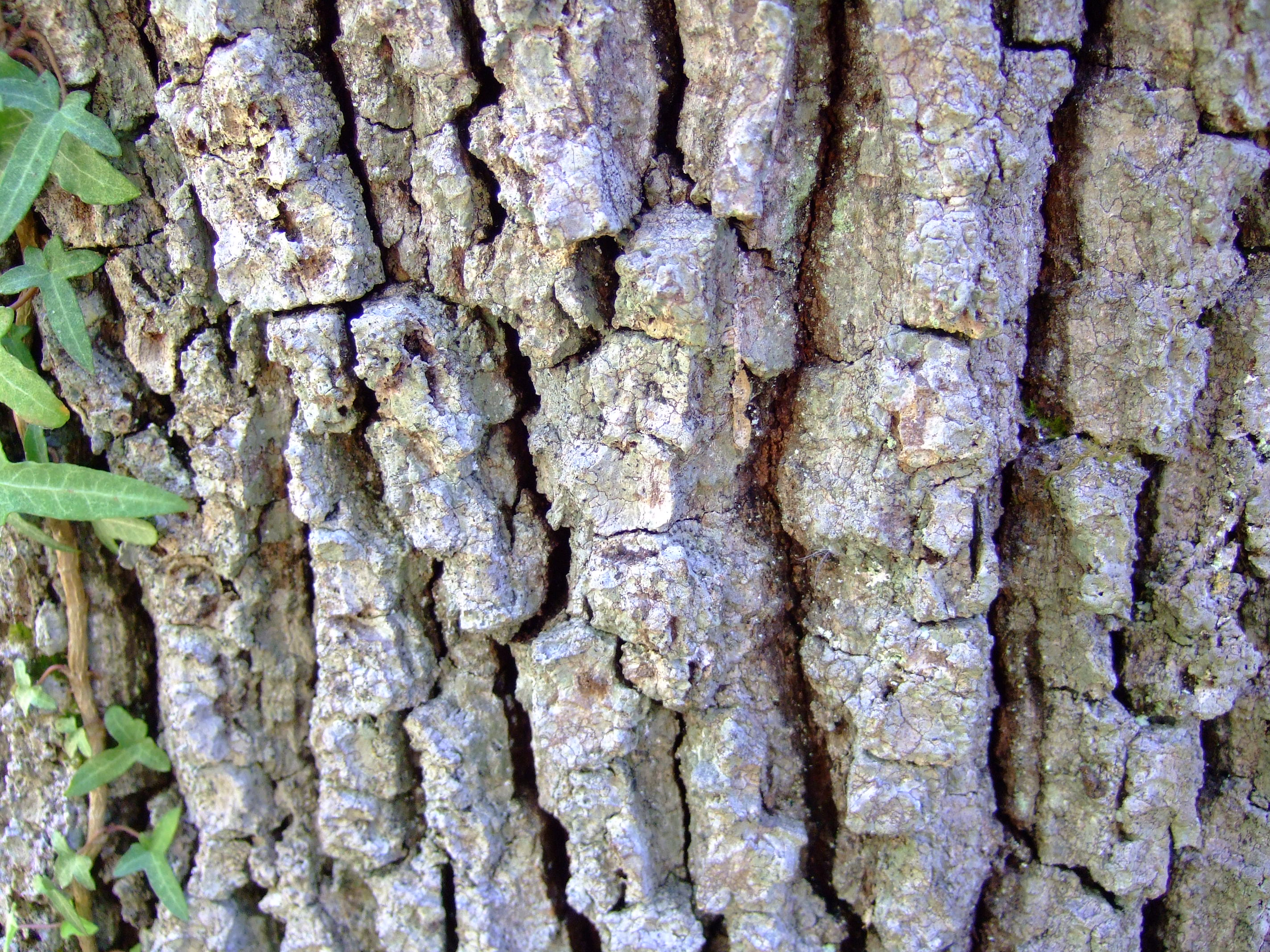
Bark texture

== Distribution and habitat ==
Quercus pyrenaica is native to the Iberian Peninsula and parts of southwest France and northern Morocco inhabiting mainly subatlantic or continental environments up to 2,100 m (6,900 ft) in elevation. In the Iberian Peninsula, which represents 95% of its population, it occupies mainly the northern portion, south of the Cantabrian Mountains, very common in the west of the Peninsula in the northern half of mountainous Portugal, and rare on the east It is adapted both to sub-humid temperate and Mediterranean semi-arid conditions, from the humid Peneda-Gerês National Park in Portugal, to the semi-arid Spanish central plain. It is also adapted to survive in hot local temperatures. It is thought to have a short growth season to avoid the summer drought. It is often the dominant species in the forests in which it occurs. Its acorns are dispersed by birds and small mammals.

== Threats ==
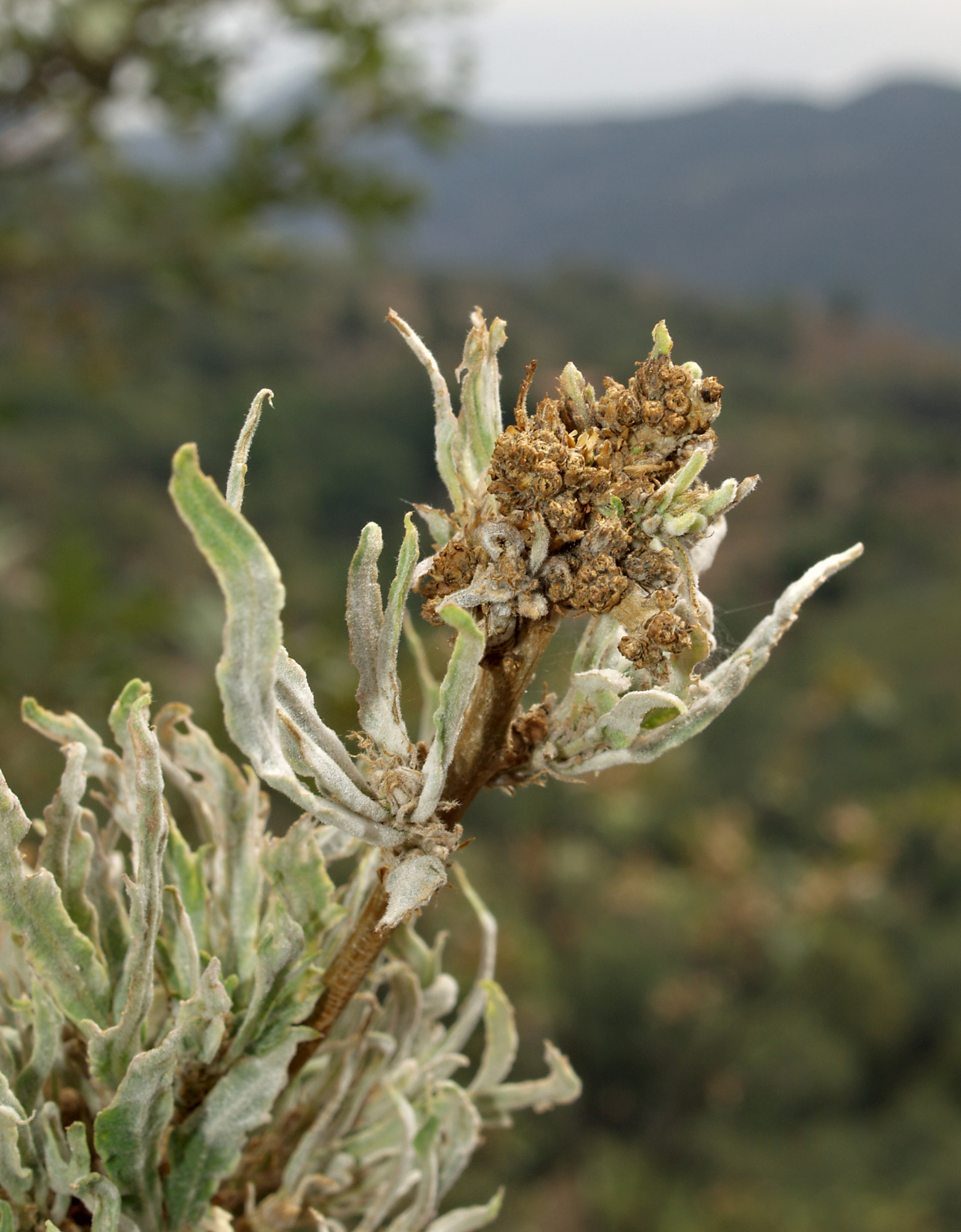
Specimen affected by pathogens

The species is currently threatened by wild fire which encourage the growth of other oak species that Q. pyrenaica is unable to compete with, and insect pathogens such as green oak leaf roller moth (Tortrix viridana), the gipsy moth (Lymantria dispar) and brown-tail moth (Euproctis chrysorrhoea); these threats may become of greater concern due to the impact of climate change.

Historically the species experienced decline due to charcoal and timber industry, and forestry activities still pose some threat to Q. pyrenaica but on a much reduced scale.
