= La Mujer Muerta =

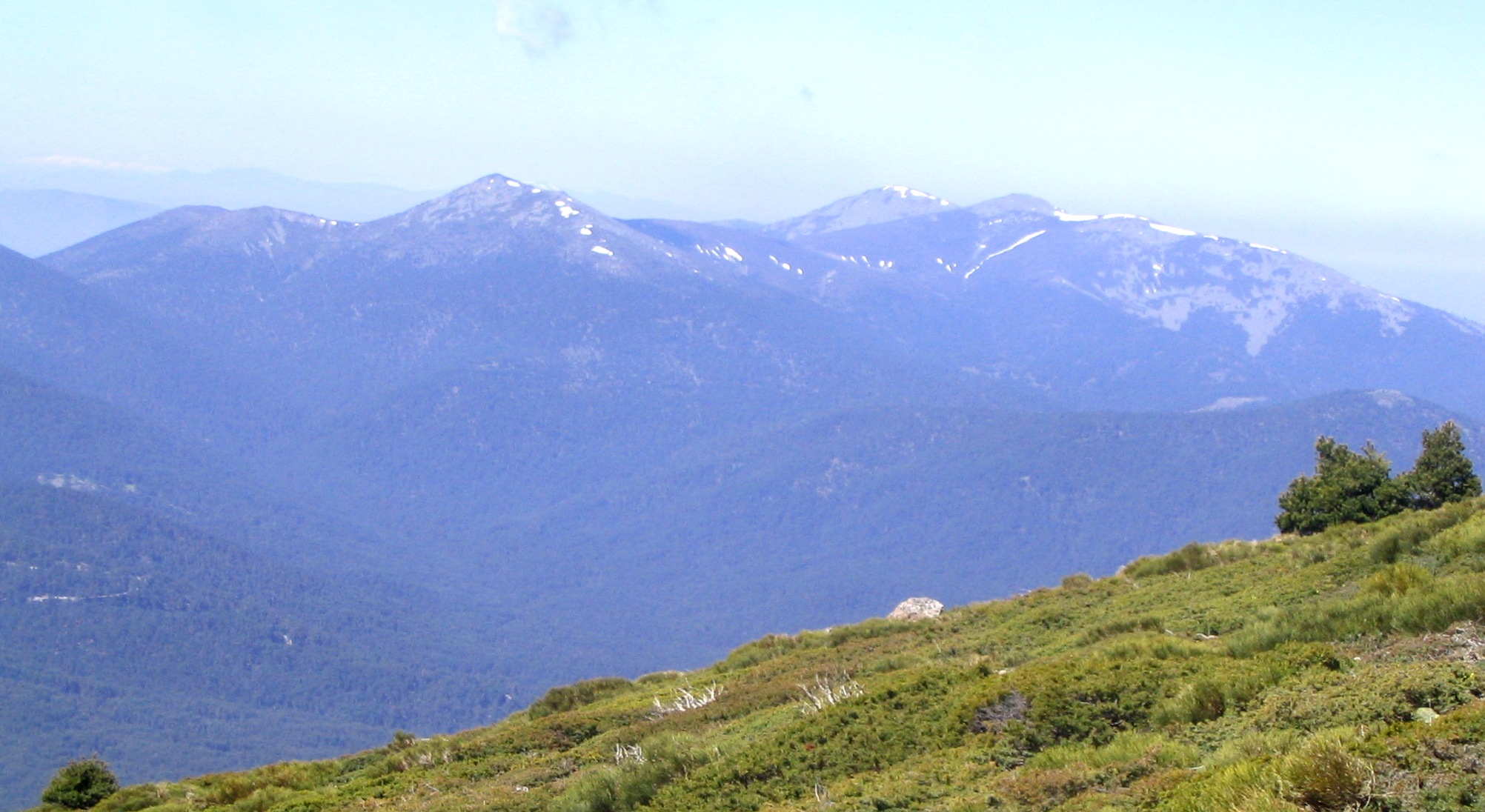
- Panoramic view of the range.

Highest point
- Elevation: 2,197 m (7,208 ft)
- Coordinates: 40.8102°N 4.0942°W

Geography
- Location: Iberian Peninsula, Spain
- Parent range: Sistema Central

La Mujer Muerta (English translation: “The Dead Woman”) is a subrange of the Sierra de Guadarrama, Sistema Central, located in Segovia Province, Spain.

The silhouette of the mountain range takes the shape of a reclining woman with when seen from certain angles, hence its name which means "dead woman" in the Spanish language. The highest point is La Pinareja (2197 m).

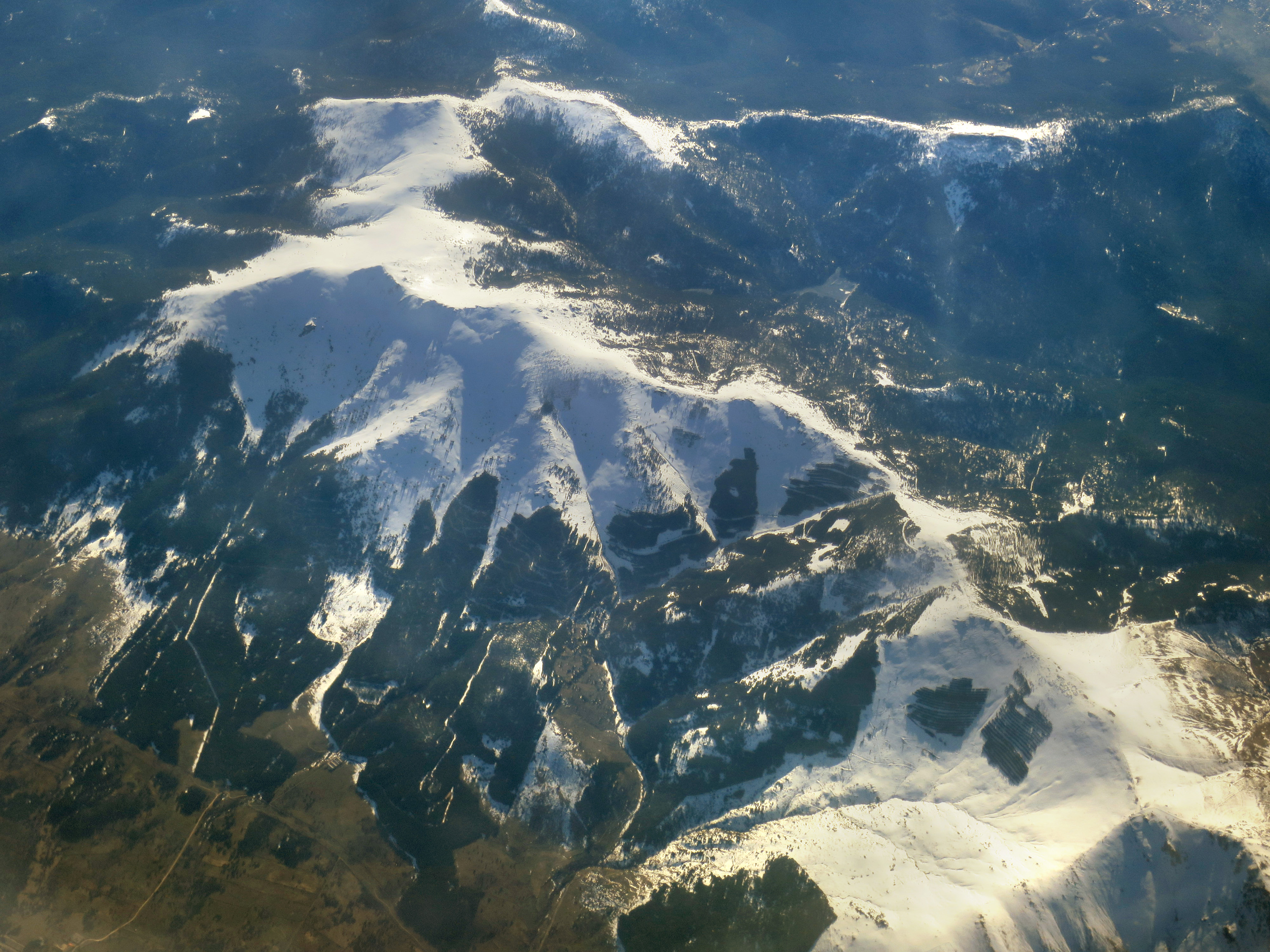
Aerial view of La Mujer Muerta

== Legends ==
There are many legends that try to explain the name, La Mujer Muerta, with the mountains La Pinareja, Peña el Oso, and Pico de Pasapán that form, when viewed from the city, the body of a woman that is dead or sleeping. One story is that the woman's husband went off to war and failed to keep his promise that he would return and marry her. She died of a broken heart and that is her body in the mountain.

According to this, the peak of La Pinareja corresponds to the face of the woman laying on her back. The peak of Peña el Oso corresponds to her arms crossed over her chest. Finally, Pico de Pasapán corresponds to the woman's feet.

A legend with a more pastoral backgrounds speaks of a farmer's beautiful daughter who fell in love with a farmer too. This farmer saw a different man in her doorway one night and, out of jealousy, killed him. The woman was killed at the same time and in a storm a few days later, the mountain was formed.

== Airplane crash ==
On 4 December 1958, an Aviaco SNCASE SE.161 Languedoc flying from Vigo Airport to Barajas Airport, Madrid lost height in bad weather and struck La Rodilla de la Mujer Muerta. None of the 21 passenger and crew survived.

== See also ==
- Dead woman (disambiguation)#Geography
