= Risco de los Claveles =

Mountain in Spain

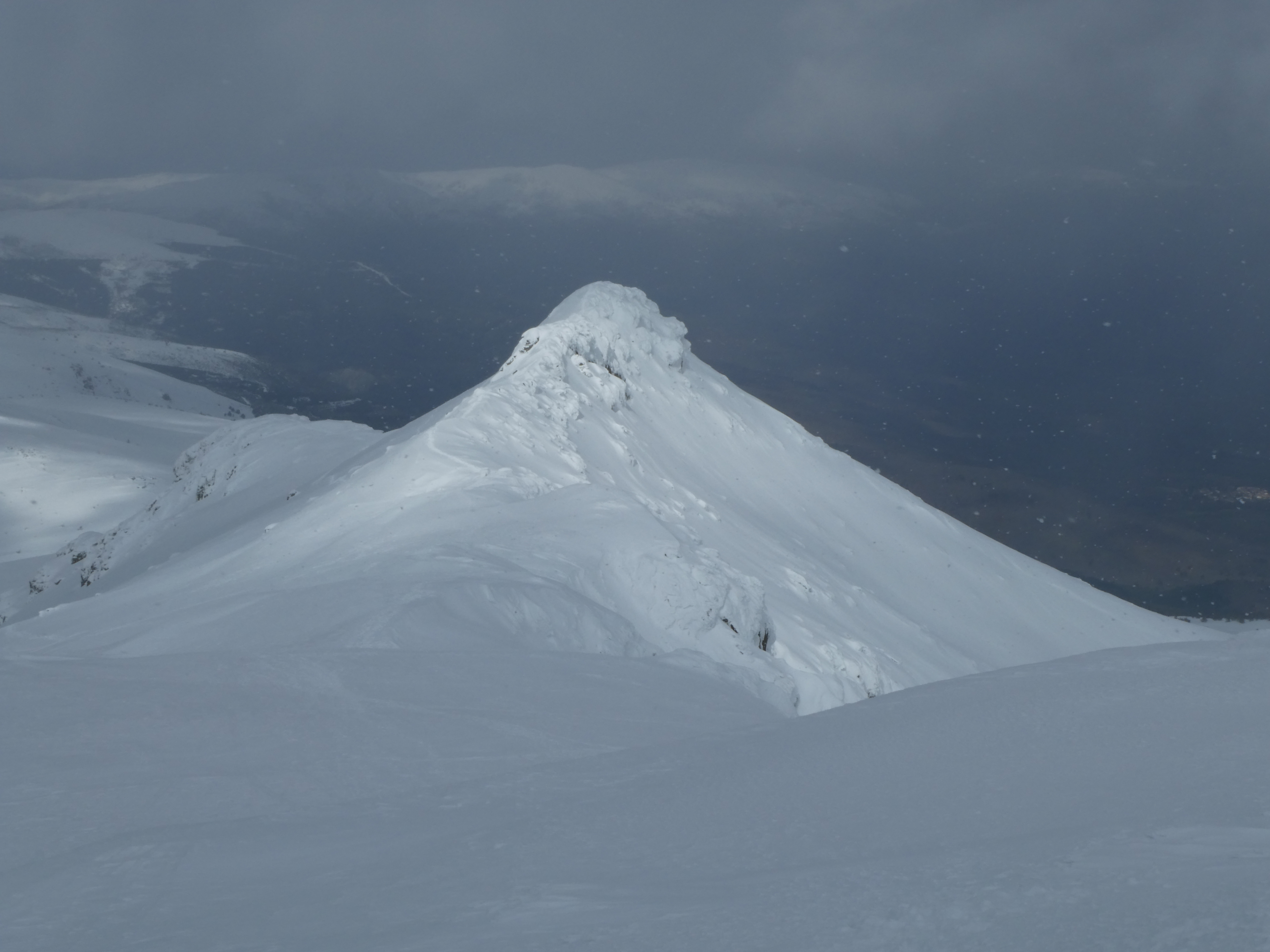
- Risco de los Claveles snowy in winter.

Highest point
- Elevation: 2,388 m (7,835 ft)
- Prominence: 13 m
- Parent peak: Peñalara

Geography
- Location: Segovia and Madrid
- Parent range: Sierra de Guadarrama

Geology
- Mountain type(s): Gneiss and granite crag.

Risco de los Claveles, (in English, Carnation Crag), is the second highest peak in the Sierra de Guadarrama (Sistema Central, Spain). It is 2366 meters high (7835 ft.), and is located in the northwest of Peñalara Natural Park, 700 meters north from Peñalara peak. Risco de los Claveles is in the limit between the Province of Segovia and Community of Madrid.

== Description ==
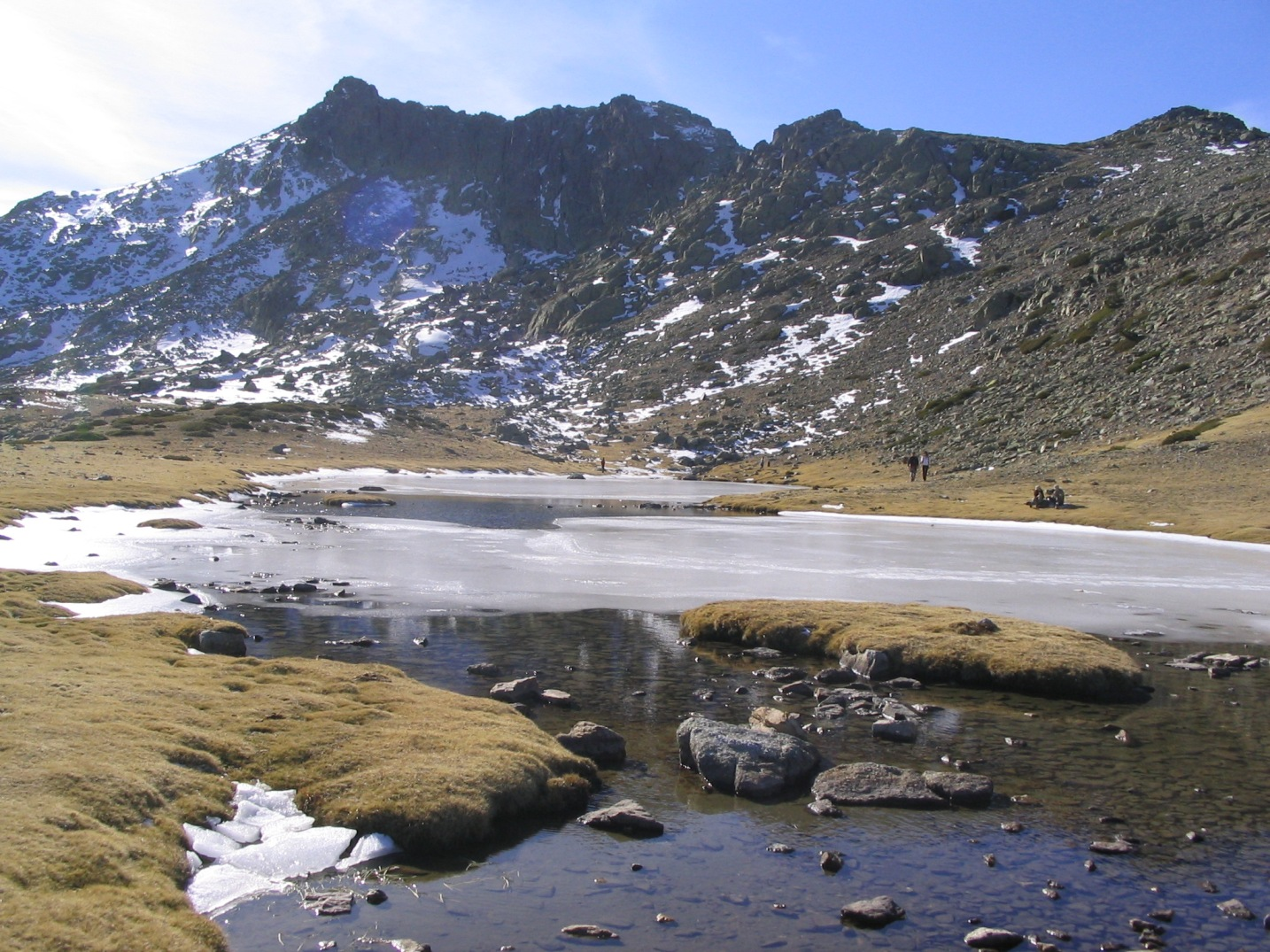
Risco de los Claveles as seen from Laguna de los Pájaros.

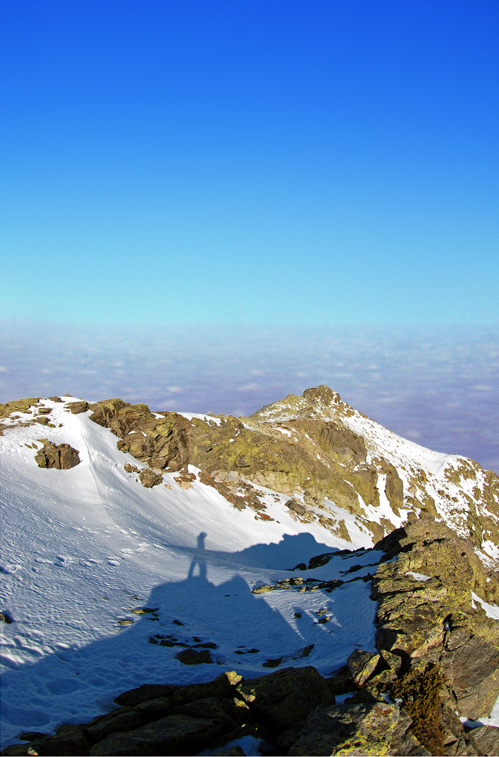
Risco de los Claveles from Peñalara.

Risco de los Claveles is a sharp mount. The sides are covered in vegetation. Under 2000 meters, there is abundant life:pine, eagles, insects and vultures. Above that, there are some bushes and grass.

== Gallery ==
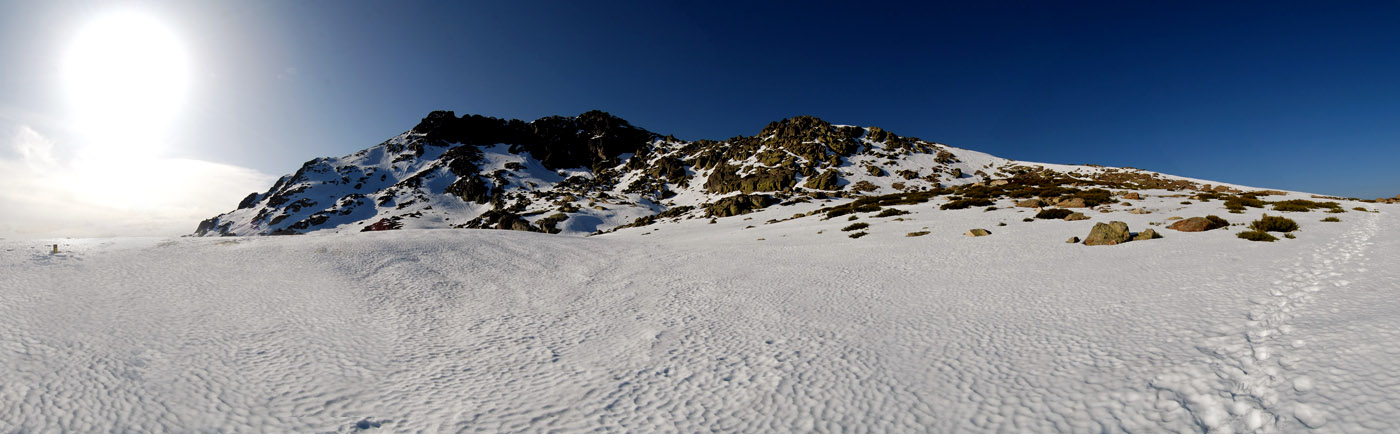
Risco de los Claveles as seen from Peñalara plains.

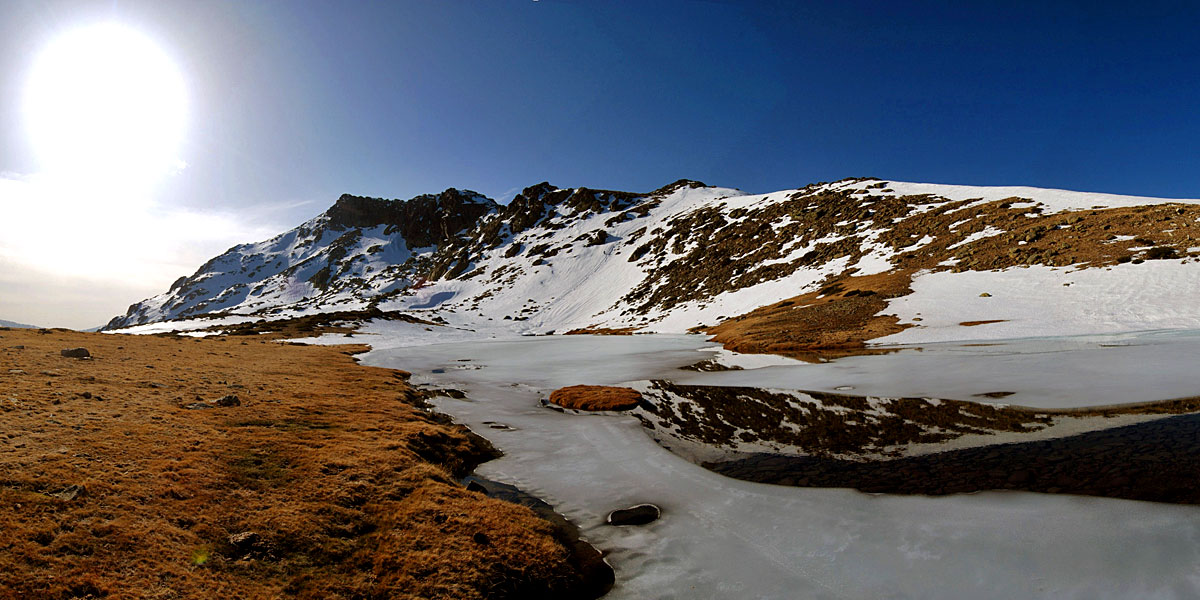
Laguna de los Pájaros and Risco de los Claveles in the Peñalara Massif.

== See also ==
- Sierra de Guadarrama
- Peñalara
- Mountains of Spain
