= Sierra de Guadarrama =

Mountain range in Spain

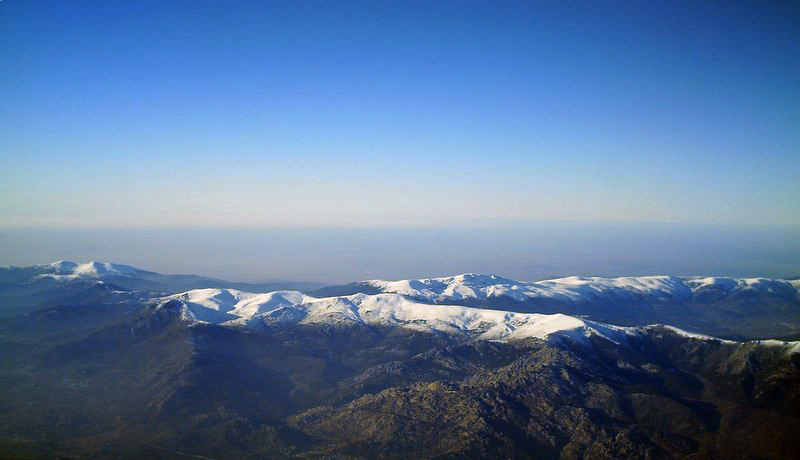

Highest point
- Elevation: 2,428 m (7,966 ft)
- Coordinates: 40.850139°N 3.956231°W

Geography
- Location: Iberian Peninsula, Spain
- Parent range: Sistema Central

Geology
- Rock type: Granite

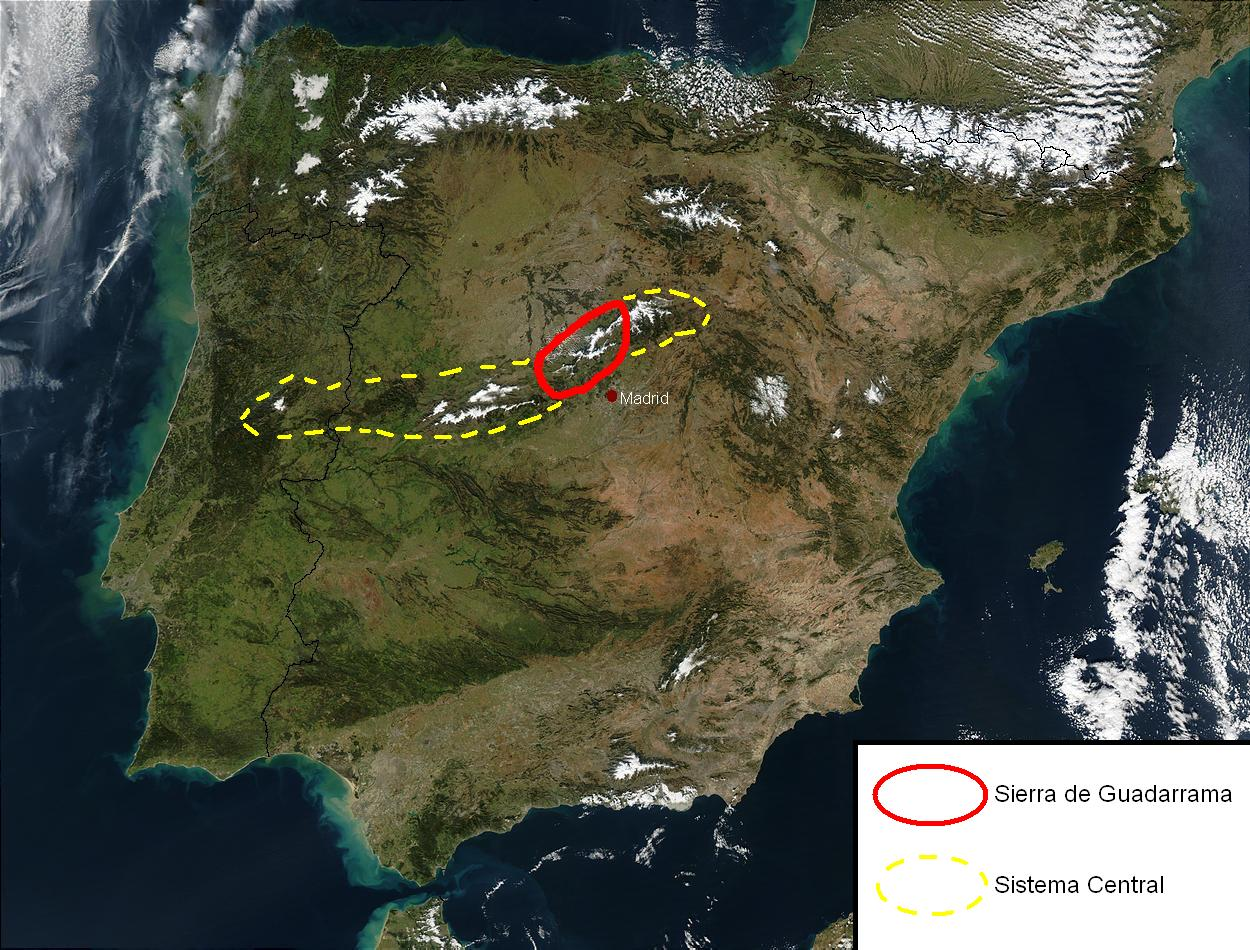
Satellite image: Sierra de Guadarrama in red, Sistema Central in dashed yellow.

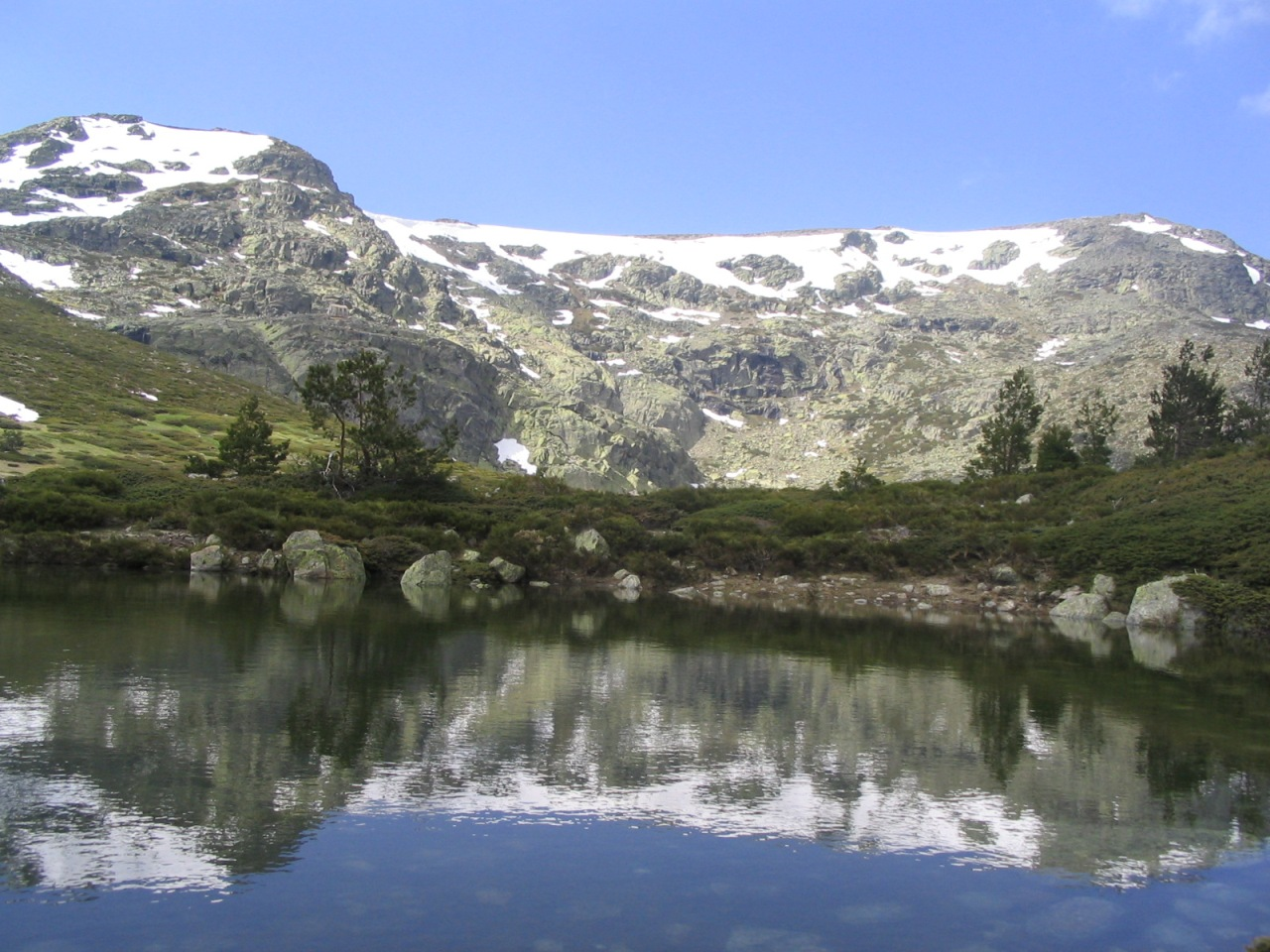
Peñalara, the highest peak

The Sierra de Guadarrama (Guadarrama Mountains) is a mountain range forming the main eastern section of the Sistema Central, the system of mountain ranges along the centre of the Iberian Peninsula. It is in Spain, between the systems Sierra de Gredos in the province of Ávila, and Sierra de Ayllón in the province of Guadalajara.

The range runs southwest–northeast, extending from the province of Ávila in the southwest, through the Community of Madrid, to the province of Segovia in the northeast. The range measures approximately 80 kilometres (50 mi) in length. Its highest peak is Peñalara, 2,428 metres (7,966 ft) in elevation.

The flora of the Sierra de Guadarrama is characterized by the higher elevation Atlantic vegetation region with Juniper groves, montane grasslands, Spanish broom thickets, pine forests, and Pyrenean oaks forests; and in the lower elevation Mediterranean vegetation region by Holm oak forests, while the pastures around the summits are fringed by juniper and Spanish broom shrubs. The mountains abound with a variety of wildlife such as Iberian ibex, roe deer, fallow deer, wild boar, badger, various types of weasel, European wild cat, fox and hare. The area is also rich in birdlife, including birds of prey such as the Spanish imperial eagle and the Eurasian black vulture.

The mountain range's proximity to Madrid means it can get crowded with visitors. The range is crossed by numerous roads and railway routes. It has a highly developed tourism infrastructure, coupled with provisions for various mountain sports. This poses a threat to the fragile environment and habitats of the mountains.

== Description ==
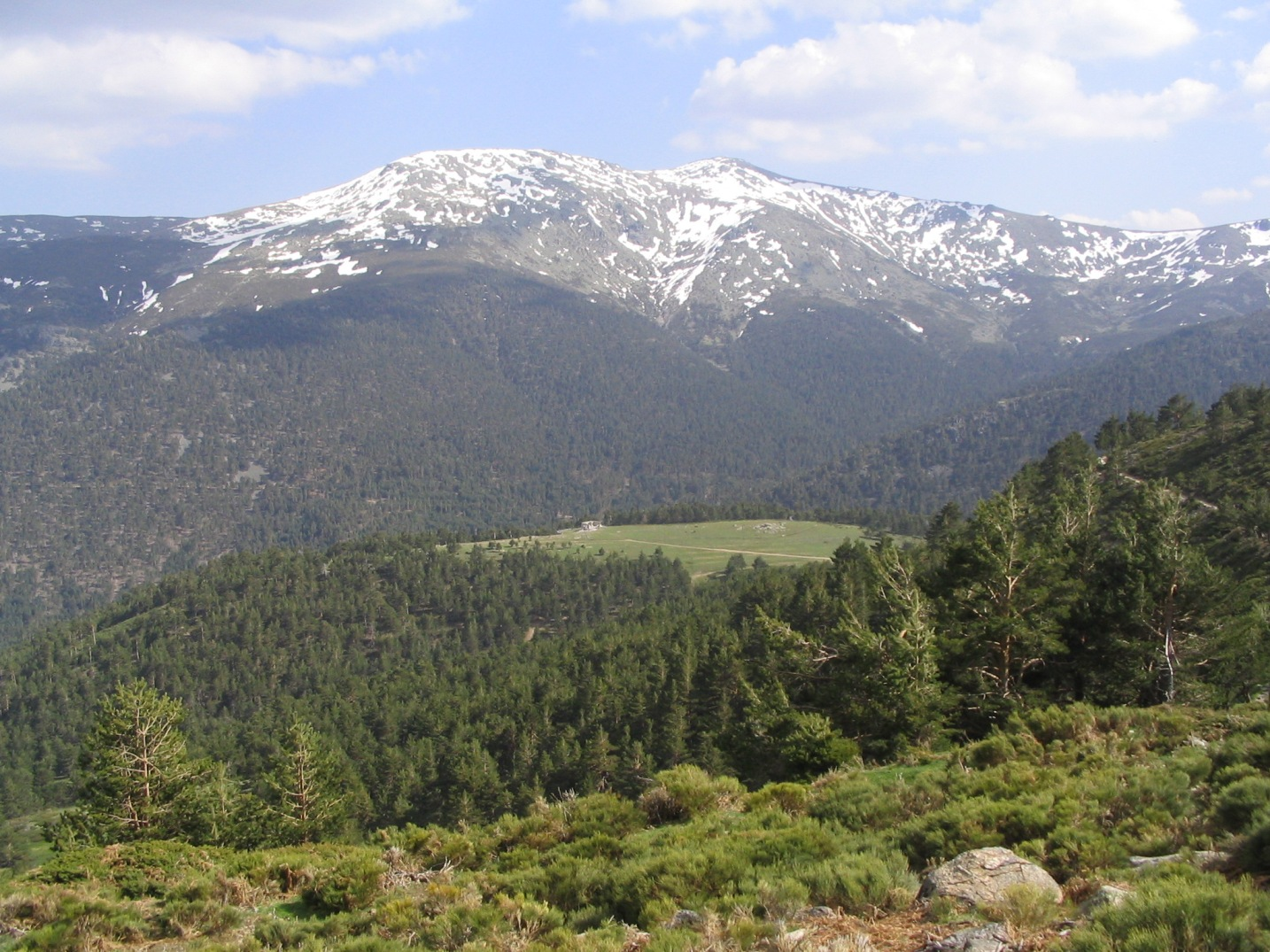
North face of Cabezas de Hierro in spring

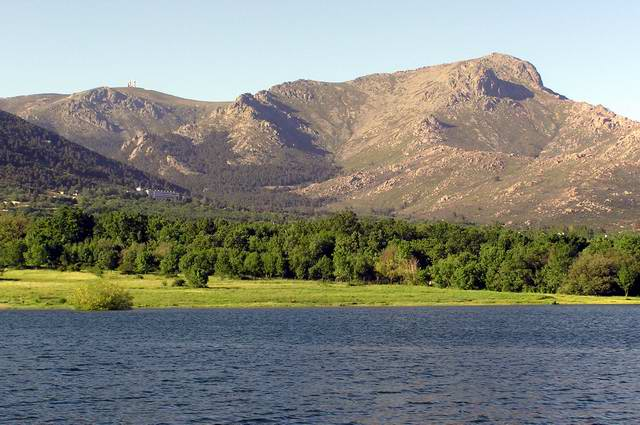
Bola del Mundo and La Maliciosa from the Navacerrada Reservoir in summer

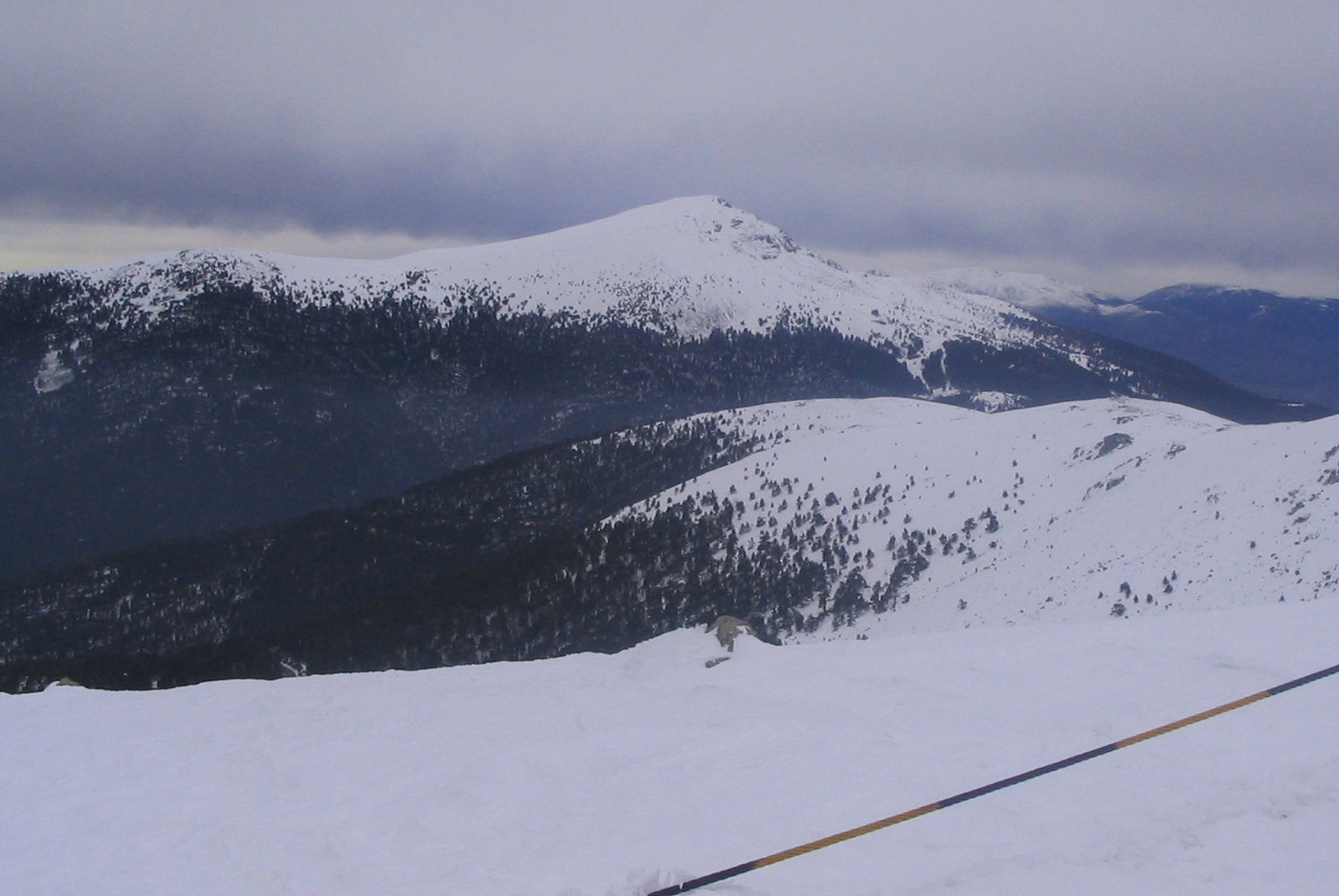
Peñalara, the range's highest peak

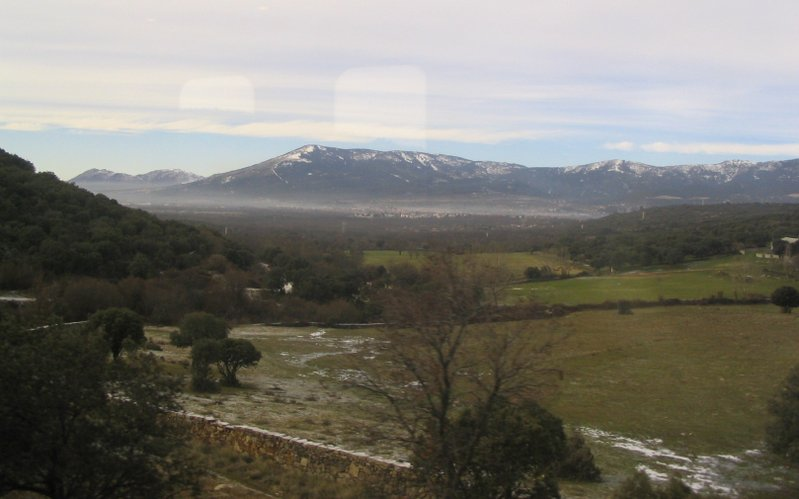
Winter holm oaks, with Monte Abantos peak in the background

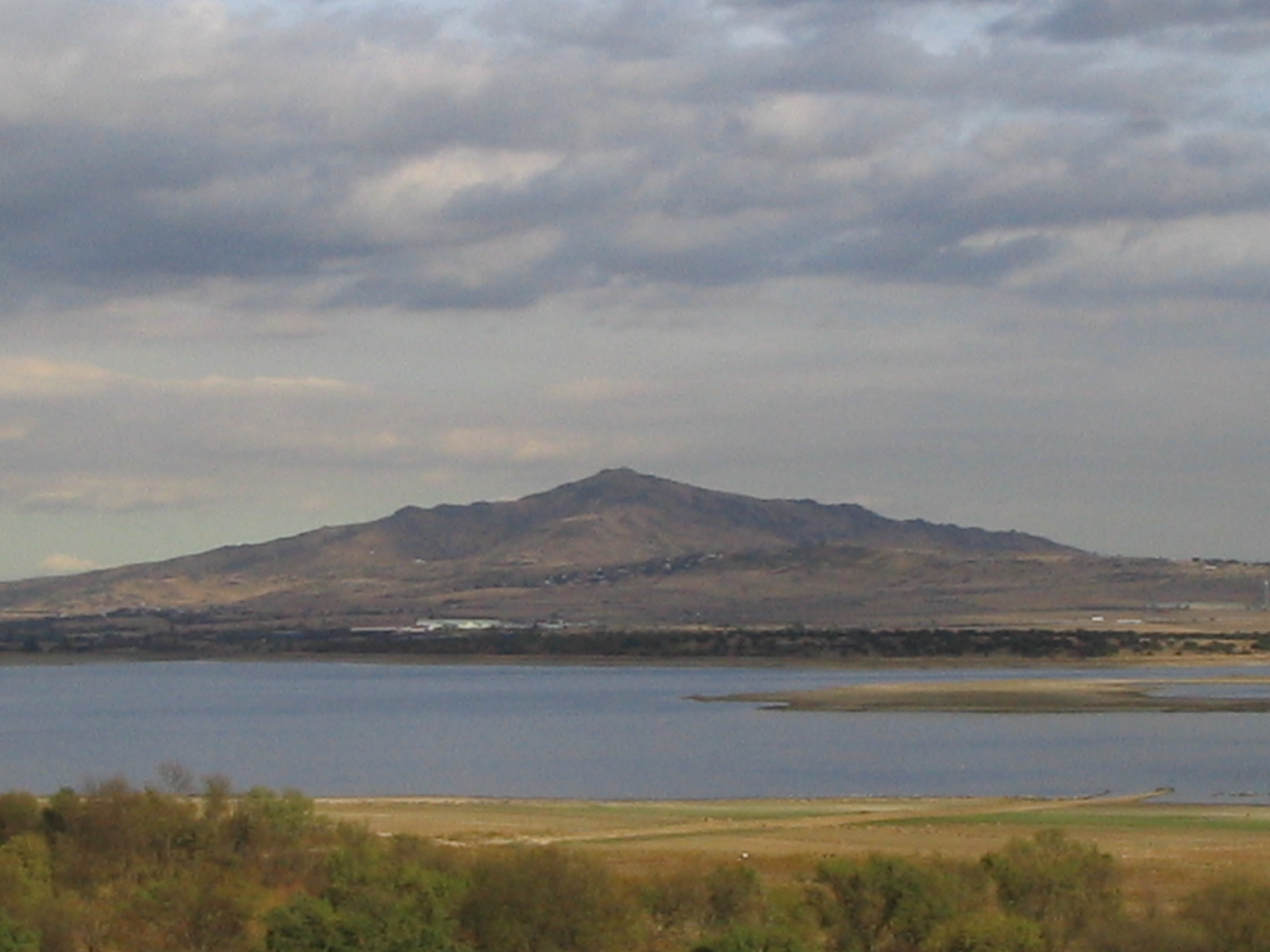
Cerro de San Pedro

=== Etymology of the name ===
The name, Sierra de Guadarrama (Guadarrama Mountains), is taken from the Guadarrama River and the town of Guadarrama, both of which are located in these mountains. The word Guadarrama itself is derived from the Arabic words for 'sandy river' — composed of guad (from wadi, meaning 'river') and arrama (from ar-ramla, meaning 'sandy').

Another interpretation considers unlikely that a minor river could design a vast mountain range, and makes the name derive from the Latin aquae dirrama, meaning 'water divide', which very aptly describes the position of the sierra between the two largest water basins in the Iberian Peninsula, those of the Douro, to the north, and of the Tagus, to the south.

In the Middle Ages, this mountain range was called Sierra del Dragón ('dragon range') because of the profile of Siete Picos mountain.

=== General information ===
The Guadarramas form a natural division between the North and South mesetas of the Iberian Peninsula, part of the so-called Sistema Central.

The mountain bases are located between 900 and 1,200 metres above sea level, and the principal peaks of the range have an average topographic prominence of 1,000 metres. The range's highest peak, Peñalara, reaches 2,428 metres above sea level. The range begins in the valley of the Alberche river, which divides the Sierra de Gredos into two portions, and finishes at the Somosierra Pass, which serves as the hydrographic boundary between the river basins of the Tagus and Douro rivers. The mountains contribute fluvial material to both rivers through the action of various mountain streams, such as the Jarama, Guadarrama, and Manzanares, which empty into the Tagus, and the Duratón, Cega, and Eresma, which flow into the Duero. The geographical coordinates of the range's northeast terminus lies near 41° 4' North, 3° 44' West, and the southwestern end near 40° 22' North, 4° 18' West.

Diverging from its main southwest-to-northeast alignment, the range has a westward-trending branch: the Cuerda Larga ("Long Rope"), or Carpetanos Mountains (Montes Carpetanos). (This name is sometimes also applied to the northern part of the main axis of the Guadarramas between Peñalara and Somosierra.) The 15 km long Carpetanos sub-range is an imposing sight, starting in the Community of Madrid at Navacerrada Pass, and averaging more than 2,000 metres in elevation all the way to the Morcuera Pass (Puerto de la Morcuera). From there, the Carpetanos slope downward until they reach the confluence of the Lozoya and Jarama rivers. The highest peak of the Cuerda Larga is the Cabezas de Hierro at 2,383 metres.

Between Cuerda Larga and the main extent of the Sierra de Guadarrama lies the Lozoya valley, one of the most picturesque mountain valleys of the Sistema Central, which attracts numerous tourists in the winter for skiing, as well as in the summer for other diversions. Another western branch of the Guadarramas, La Mujer Muerta ("The Dead Woman"), or Sierra del Quintanar (Quintanar Mountains), begins at the Fuenfría Pass (Puerto de la Fuenfría), and is located entirely in the province of Segovia. It is 11 km long and has several summits surpassing 2,000 metres, among them, the Montón de Trigo ("Wheat Pile").

In addition to the Cuerda Larga and La Mujer Muerta, a series of small mountains or foothills are located on the periphery of the main range. Notably, in the Segovia area, there are the Cerro (hill) de las Cardosillas (1,635 m, 5,364 ft), the Cerro de Matabueyes (1,485 m, 4,872 ft), the Cerro del Caloco (1,565 m, 5,134 ft), and the Sierra de Ojos Albos (1,662 m, 5,452 ft); and, in the Madrid area (from north to south), there are the Cerro de San Pedro (1,423 m, 4,668 ft), the Sierra del Hoyo (1,404 m, 4,606 ft), the Cerro Cañal (1,331 m, 4,366 ft), and Las Machotas (1,466 m, 4,809 ft).

=== Notable peaks ===
The peaks of Guadarrama have a relatively soft silhouette, with few standing out as exceptionally larger than others in the chain:

- Monte Abantos (1,753 m, 5,751 ft)
- Bola del Mundo (2,265 m, 7,431 ft)
- Cabezas de Hierro (2,383 m, 7,818 ft), highest of the Cuerda Larga
- Dos Hermanas (2,285 m, 7,496 ft)
- Flecha (2,078 m, 6,807 ft)
- La Maliciosa (2,227 m, 7,306 ft)
- La Najarra (2,108 m, 6,916 ft)
- El Nevero (2,209 m, 7,227 ft); one of the most northern peaks in the mountain range
- Pandasco (2,238 m, 7,342 ft)
- Peña del Águila (2,010 m, 6,594 ft)
- Peñalara (2,428 m, 7,965 ft), the highest mountain of the Guadarramas
- La Peñota (1,945 m, 6,381 ft)
- Risco de los Claveles (2,387 m, 7,831 ft)
- Risco de los Pájaros (2,334 m, 7,657 ft)
- Siete Picos (2,138 m, 7,014 ft)
- Montón de Trigo (2,161 m, 7,089 ft)
- Cerro de Valdemartín (2,280 m, 7,480 ft)
- El Yelmo (1,717 m, 5,633 ft), the most important peak of La Pedriza

=== Geology ===
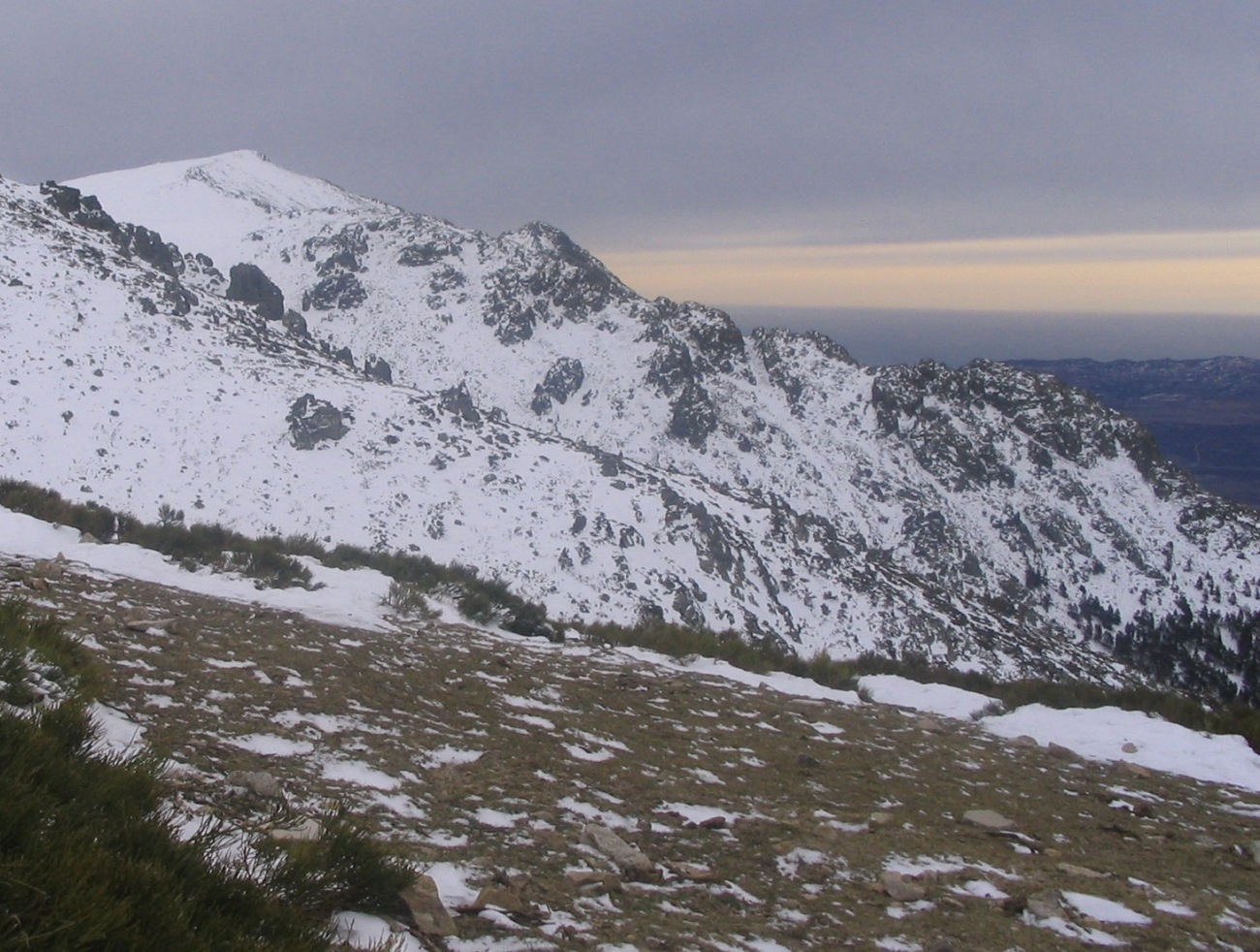
La Maliciosa peak in winter

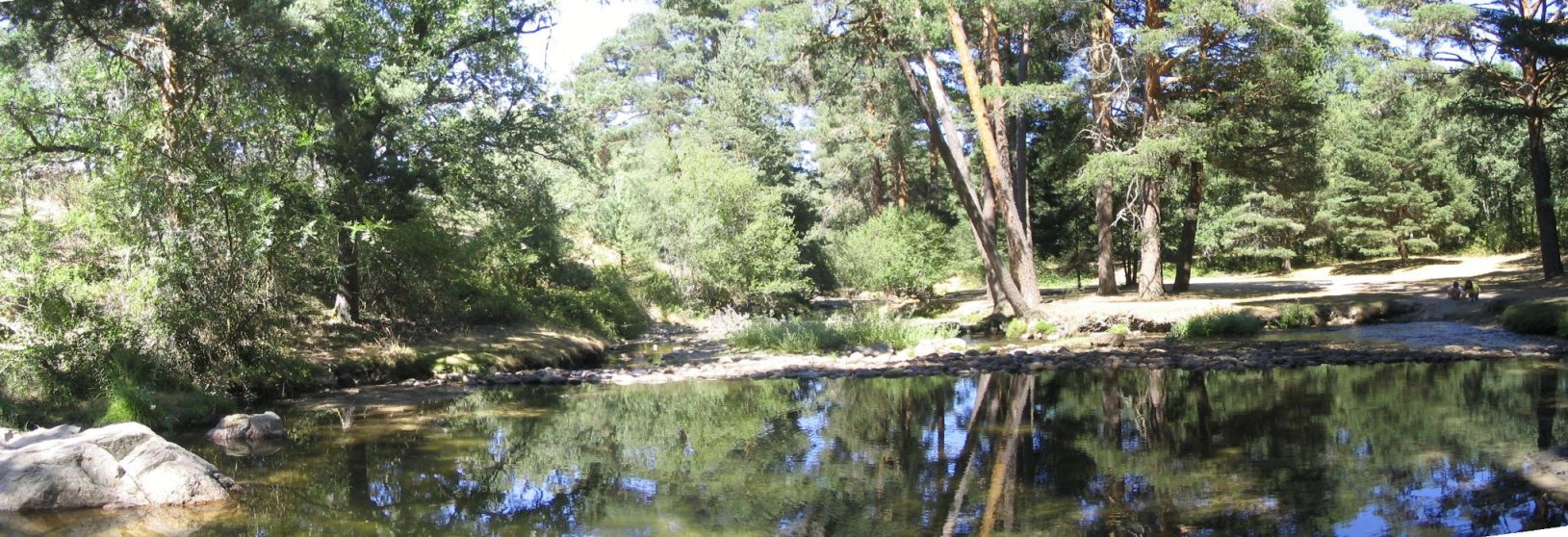
A natural pool of the Eresma River

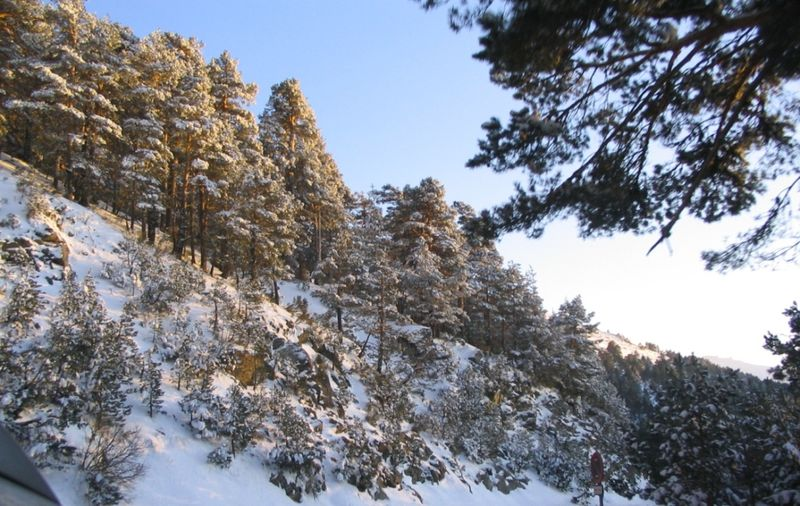
Pines in winter

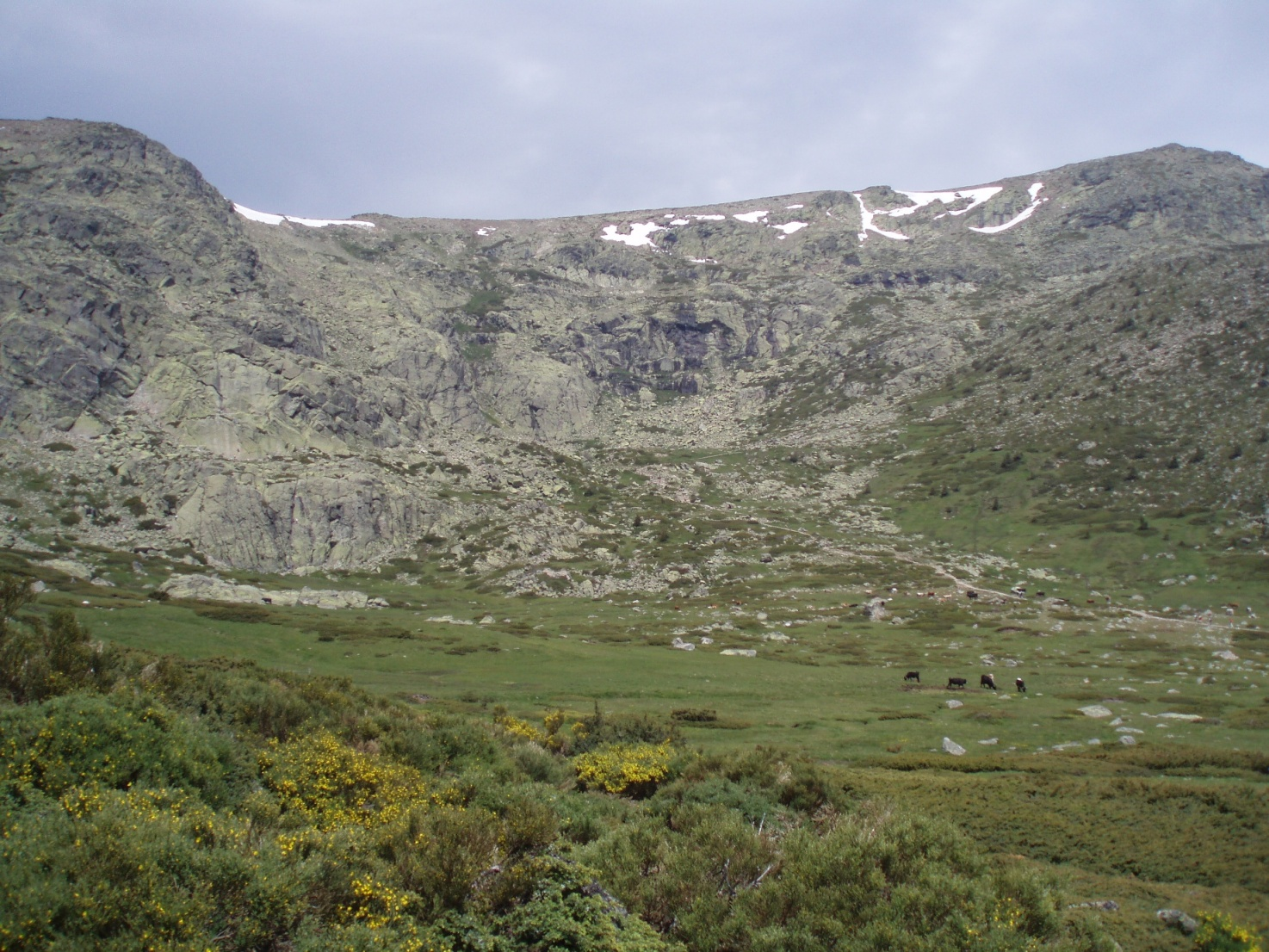
Peñalara cirque

The Sierra de Guadarrama is the result of a clash between tectonic plates belonging to the South sub-plateau and the North sub-plateau, both part of the Iberian Peninsula's larger Meseta Central (Central Plateau). The mountain range was formed during the Cenozoic era (starting 66 million years ago), although the predominant material of which the mountains are composed (granite shelf tableland) was preexisting, having been laid down during the Variscan orogeny during the Paleozoic era when the continental collision between Laurasia and Gondwana occurred to form Pangaea. The mountains have undergone significant erosion since their formation, which is the reason why many peaks, especially in the northern and southern sections, have flattened summits, called "cuerdas" by mountaineers. For these reasons, the material making up the Sierra de Guadarrama is of more ancient origin than many other well-known mountain systems, such as the Pyrenees, the Alps, the Andes and the Himalayas.

==== Formation detail ====
In the mid Paleozoic era (between 360 and 290 mya), an initial substratum of ancient granites and sediments started bending and metamorphizing, forming gneiss. Thereafter, approximately 290 and 250 mya during the Carboniferous period, the gneiss fractured, allowed a mass of magma to reach the surface which ultimately hardened into a granite shelf tableland. In the final phase of the Paleozoic era, during the Permian period, the tectonic plate collision causing the whole mountain range to rise. Finally, during the end of the Paleozoic through the Mesozoic era (between 250 and 65 mya) and up to the present, ongoing erosion processes reduced the size and smoothed and rounded the profile of the mountains of the Guadarramas.

It was also during this geologic era that an ocean shift took place, causing the present-day location of the mountains to be part of the ocean for a time. It is possible that the then-peak formations were only small islands, barely rising above the level of the ocean. This accounts for the presence of limestone (a sedimentary rock formed predominately from calcite derived from marine organisms) found in the rims of Guadaramma mountain peaks and in some of their interior caves. Limestone formations are evident at a number of the peaks, notably El Vellón, La Pinilla and Patones.

Other processes were in play during the Cenozoic era that shaped the present form of the Guadarramas. The erosion of the rocky massif provoked sedimentation which filled the mountain basins with sandstone. The action of glaciers during the Quaternary Period (1.8 mya up to the present) shaped several mountain profiles with small cirques, carved glacial lakes and left behind moraines. All three features can be found on Peñalara. Additionally, some traces of glacial passage are found in El Nevero and La Maliciosa in the form of sheepback-grooved rocks and small cirques. Finally, in the last million years, the action of glaciers caused consolidation of the network of rivers crisscrossing the mountain slopes, carved valleys and terraces resulting in the current appearance of the landscape.

=== Principal cities and towns ===
The Sierra de Guadarrama is surrounded by prominent population centres, which feature many second residences, occupied during holiday periods. The population pressure on and nearby the southeast slopes of the mountains near the Community of Madrid is very high, motivated partly by the large quantity of people who wish to live near the mountains. The most important cities are San Lorenzo de El Escorial, Guadarrama, Navacerrada, Cercedilla, Manzanares el Real, Miraflores de la Sierra and Rascafría in the Community of Madrid, and Los Ángeles de San Rafael and San Ildefonso in the province of Segovia. These towns are departure points for accessing the nearby mountain slopes and function as a centre of the tourism trade providing lodgings, restaurants and stores for visitors. Although these municipalities are located at the feet of the mountains, they are situated below 1,200 meters. The Sierra de Guadarrama serves as backdrop for the cities of Madrid and Segovia, although Segovia is located closer to the peaks than is Madrid.

=== Places of interest ===
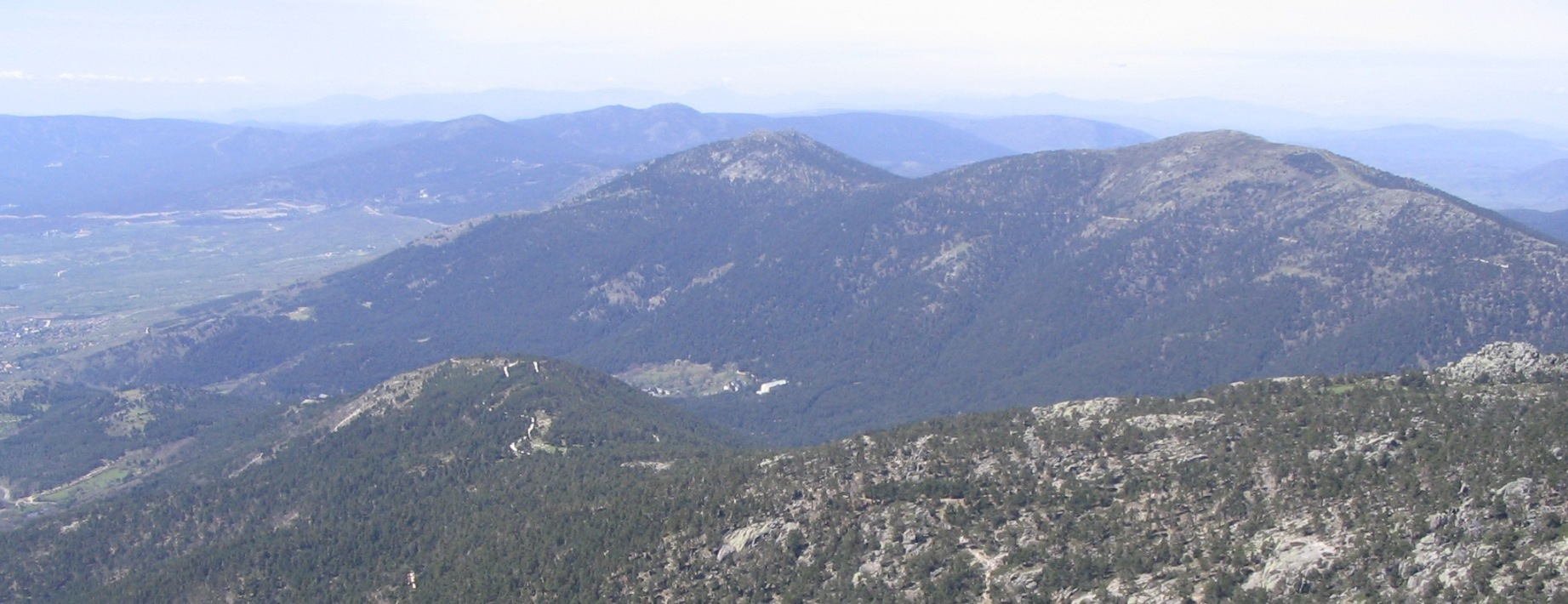
Valle de la Fuenfría, as seen from Siete Picos

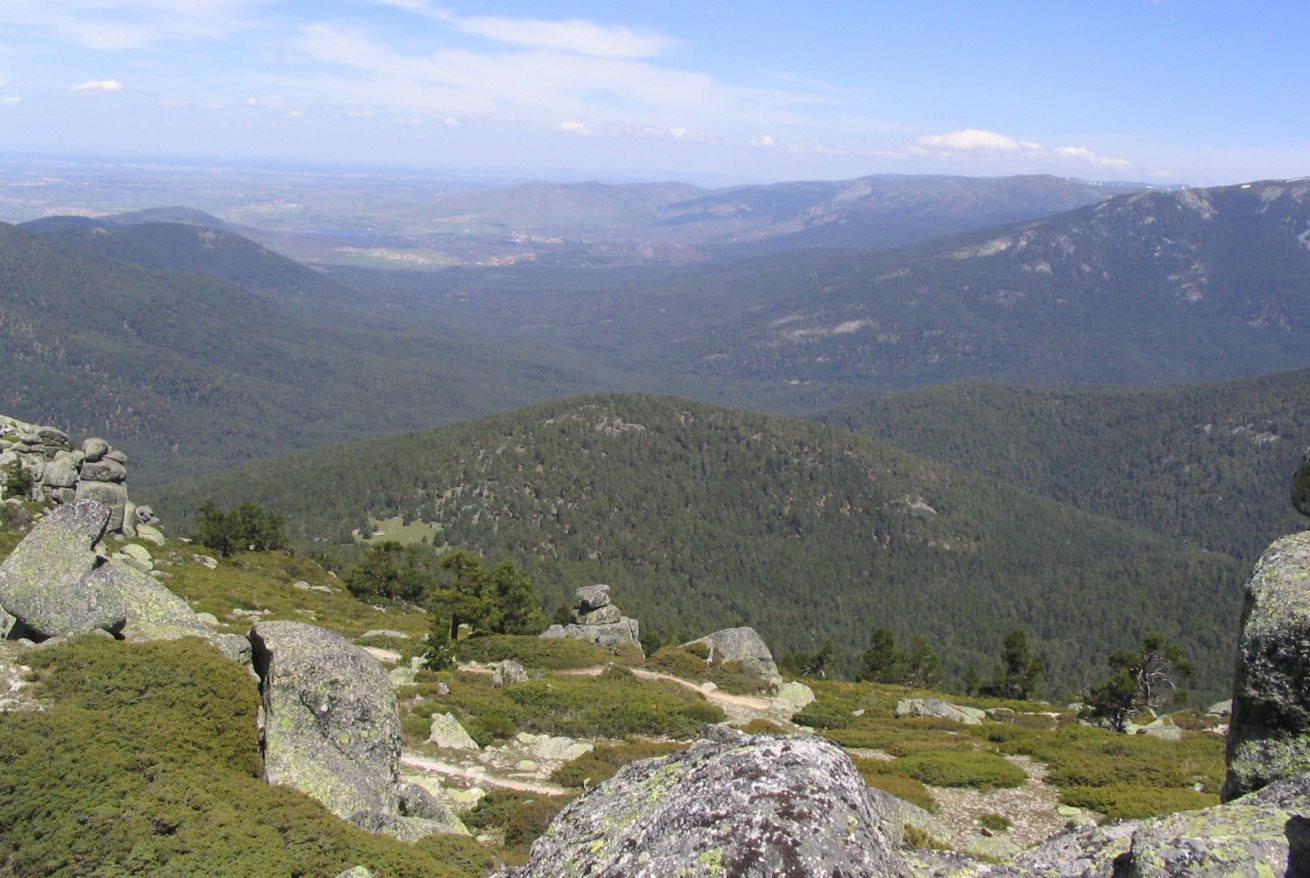
Valle de Valsaín, as seen from Siete Picos

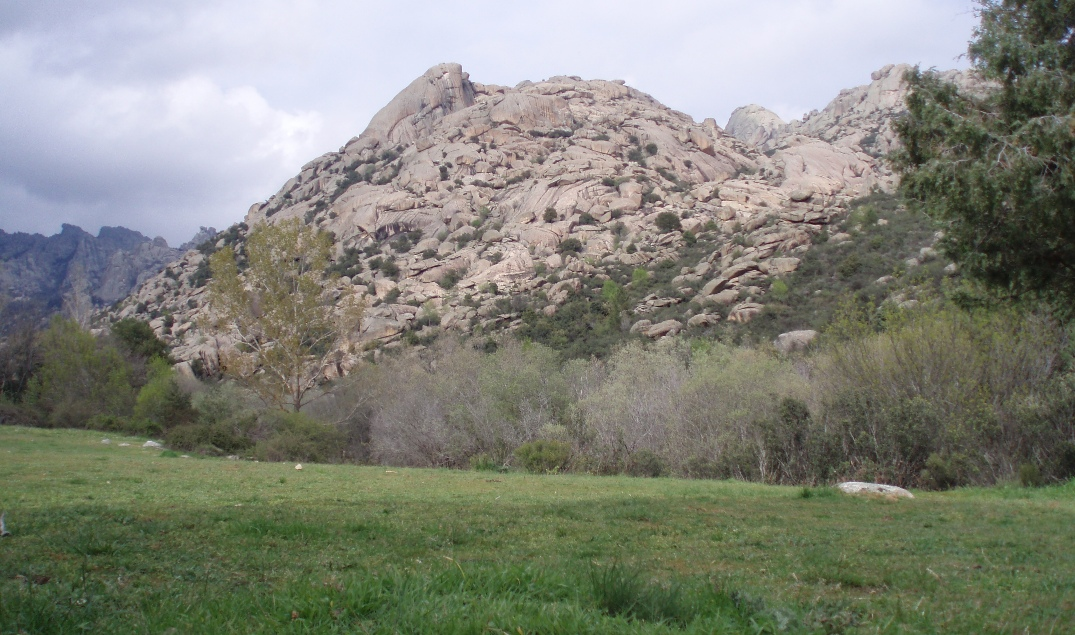
La Pedriza

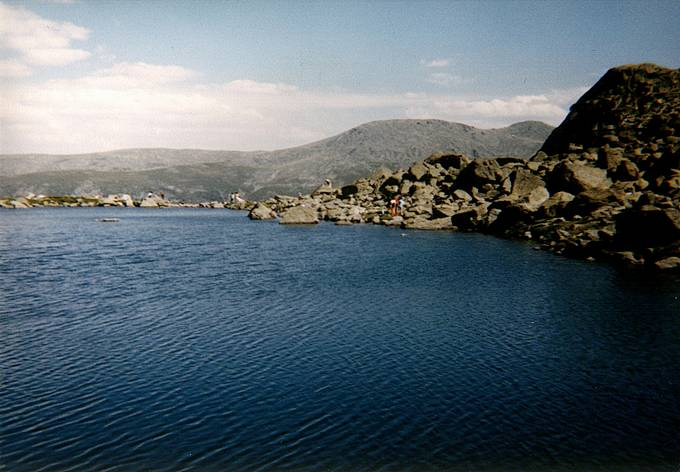
Peñalara's Laguna grande

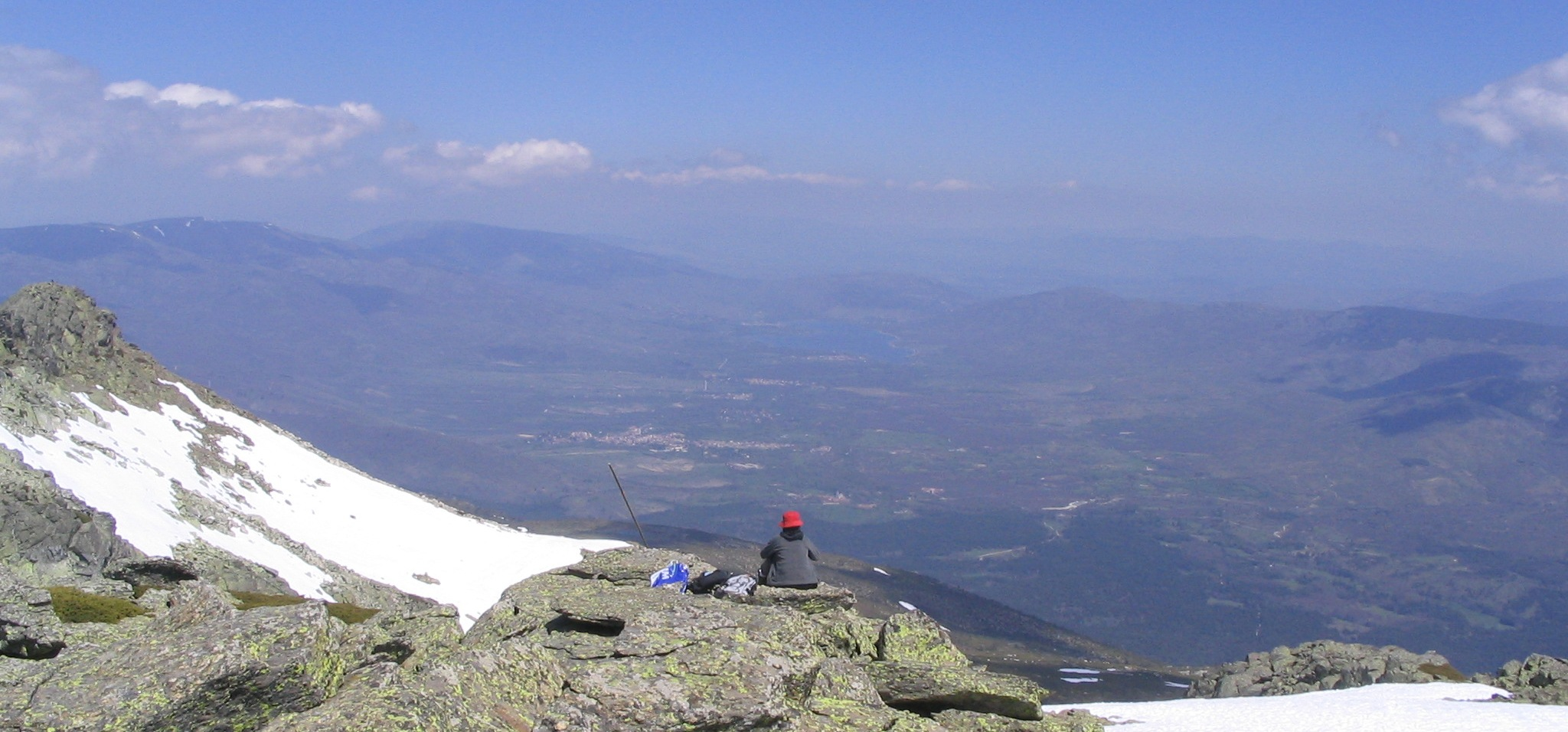
Valle del Lozoya, seen from Peñalara

The Sierra de Guadarrama has a series of valleys and zones which are of special interest from both an aesthetic and ecological viewpoint. Due to the proximity of Madrid's metropolitan area to the Guadarramas, many such special interest zones are host to a large number of mountain climbers and general interest tourists the year round. The most heavily visited areas are the Parque Natural de Peñalara (Peñalara Natural Park) and La Pedriza, an unusual mountain formation.

Valle (valley) de la Fuenfría
An eastern valley in Cercedilla, the Community of Madrid, featuring one of the better preserved wild pine forests of the mountains. The valleys faces in a north to south direction, has a length of approximately 5 km, a width of approximately 2 km and is located between Siete Picos and the edge of the province of Segovia. The valley's dense forest features a deep creek and a well-preserved, ancient Roman road that crosses the mountain running toward the Fuenfría Pass. On weekends and holidays the valley is flooded with tourists and mountain climbers who debark at a recreation area with a car park at the valley's lower edge.

Valle de Valsaín
Like the Fuenfría, the Valsaín valley is also covered by a well-preserved pine tree woodland, considered the best of the Guadarramas. It is a wide, sloped valley running in a north to south direction, having a length of approximately 10 km, an average width of 5 km, and is located between the mountains, Mujer Muerta and the bulk of Peñalara. On its lower slopes is the municipality of Valsain, named after the valley. In the heart of the valley, amidst the pine and oak groves, there are three separate recreation centers, each with areas for parking. Nearby these areas are a number of human-made Eresma river dams that create small pools suitable for bathing in the summer. Several paths begin in the recreation area that crisscross the whole of the woodsy valley.

La Pedriza
The Pedriza is one of the more exceptional areas of the mountain range. It is located on the south slope of the Cuerda Larga, in the municipal area of Manzanares el Real (part of the province of Madrid) and inside the Parque Regional (Regional Park) de la Cuenca Alta del Manzanares. The Pedriza's landscape is noted for its enormous rock formations and walls of granite displaying unusual and eye-catching configurations. Below the high rocky areas is an underbrush made up of rockroses and savin junipers which become a pine thicket farther way from the rock face. At the heart of the small valleys that make up La Pedriza runs the Manzanares river at the high river basin of its course. In the low part of the area is a recreational area with parking accommodations which allows visitors several routes to cross the territory. The most esteemed and sensational peak of La Pedriza, as well as its largest, is El Yelmo (The Helmet), a gigantic granite rockface towering over the surrounding peaks, rising to 1,700 m in elevation. El Yelmo's south face presents a massive stone wall that is highly prized by advanced mountain climbers. Throughout its history, La Pedriza's complex of caves was used as a hideout by exiles and by those seeking shelter during times of war.

Peñalara's cirques and lakes
On the south slope of the Sierra de Guadarrama's highest peak, Peñalara (2,428 m), is a protected area considered to be of exceptional beauty and which has been declared a nature reserve under the title Parque Natural de Peñalara; the only area of the Guadarramas to receive such official designation. In the reserve are found, three cirques and a series of lakes, all the handiwork of ancient glacial action. Peñalara's cirques take the form of walls rising more than 300 meters in the shape of a "U". Several small lakes are found in the areas surrounding the cirques, up to a height of approximately 2,000 m, which give rise to streams and small waterfalls during spring thaws. Most outstanding of these are the Laguna Grande (Big Lagoon), the Laguna Chica (Small Lagoon), the Lagunas de los Claveles (Lagoons of the Carnations) and the Laguna de los Pájaros (Lagoon of the Birds). Below 2,000 m, wild pine forests are also found in the designated zone. In the heights of the nature reserve are prairies in which high mountain shrubs dominate the terrain. The reserve is accessed by three routes feeding to and from the Puerto de Cotos.

Valle del Lozoya
The Valle del Lozoya is the most extensive valley of the Sierra de Guadarrama range and one of the best conserved. It is located entirely within the Community of Madrid, between the Cuerda Larga and the main alignment of the mountain system, running in a southwest to northeast direction, and located, with respect the range as a whole, at its northeast stretch. The valley is more than 25 km in length and 6 km in average width. The slopes of the valley are covered with wild pine, oak and chestnut forests. By contrast, the lower valley area is dominated by grass pastures and farm crops. In the heart of the valley are two towns: Rascafría and Lozoya, both of which lend their names to the two rivers that run through the valley.

=== Hydrography ===
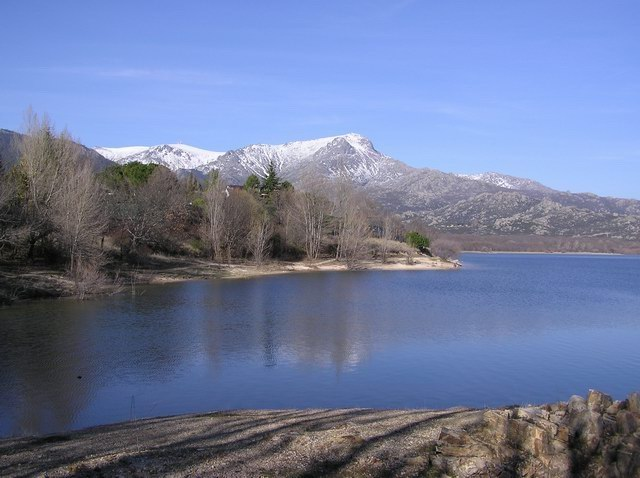
Navacerrada Dam

The climate of the Sierra de Guadarrama is marked by heavy precipitation which gives birth to the territory's numerous streams and rivers. There are several rivers of special relevance. The range's Segovia facing slopes give rise to the Moros and Eresma rivers, with the latter flowing through the City of Segovia. The Madrid facing slopes give rise to the Guadarrama river (from which the range and the town of Guadarrama take their names), the Manzanares river, that passes by Madrid, and the Lozoya river (location of the El Atazar Dam), that passes by its namesake valley. On the South slope of the peak of Peñalara, at 2,200 m of elevation, there is a series of small, protected lakes of glacial origin.

Although the mountain range proper features a great number of dams, they are all of small volume. In the Segovia facing slopes, the more prominent dams are Peces, Revenga, Pontón and Pirón, while on the Madrid facing slopes are found the Tobar, Jarosa, Navacerrada and Pinilla. Outside the boundaries of the mountain range, in the Community of Madrid, there are three dams of much greater size: the Valmayor, Santillana and Pardo.

== Flora and fauna ==
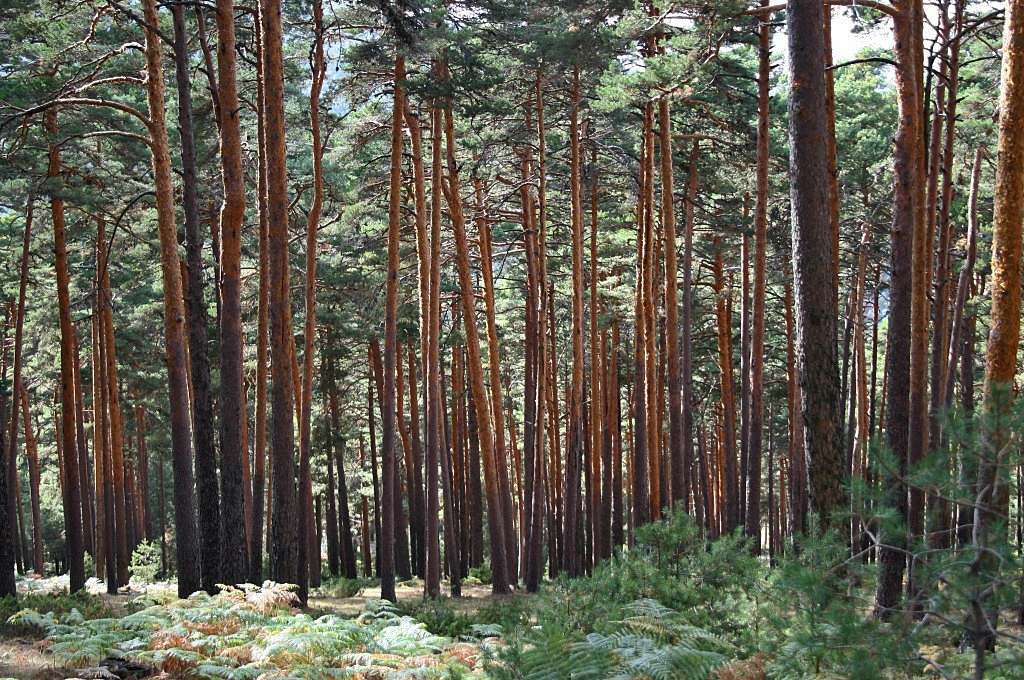
Wild pine forest with fern ground cover.

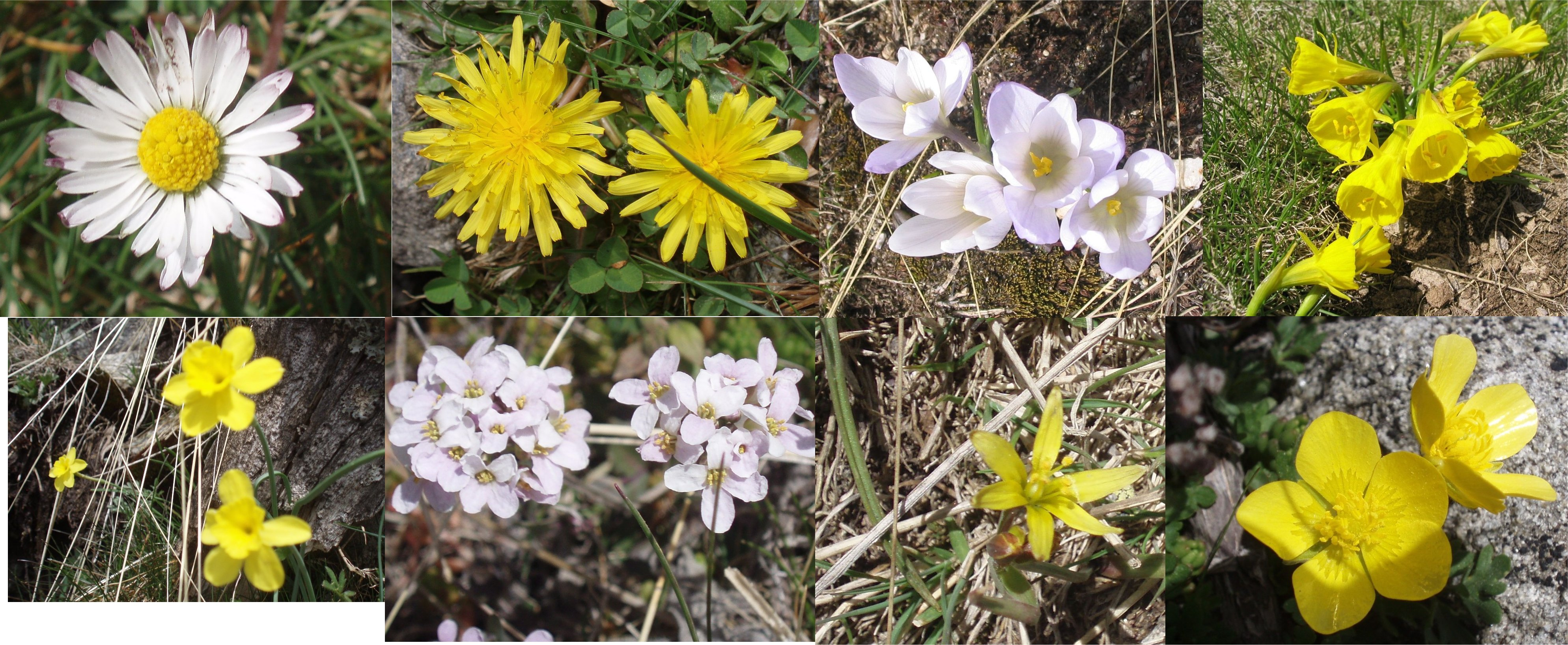
Flowers in Peñalara Natural Park's mountains. Left: Crocus sp. Right: Narcissus cf. bulbicoides

The flora and fauna of the Sierra de Guadarrama is very diverse, reflecting something of a synthesis between species common to the mediterranean landscape and climate of Spain's Central Plateau, and the more specialized plants and animals native to the higher altitude and mountainous terrain of the Pyrenees and Alps.

=== Flora ===
The high slopes of the mountains are covered in Alpine grasses and are extensively used as grazing land for cattle. The meat that these cattle produce is of excellent quality and is specially denominated and certified as Ternera de Guadarrama ("Veal of Guadarrama"). Below the high mountain pastures, in the subalpine and mountainous flats, are some of the best natural scots pine (Pinus sylvestris) forests in Spain.

Below the pine forests, the middle elevations are covered by groves of Pyrenean oak (Quercus pyrenaica), which sometimes encroach on the higher pine belt; this is problematic as Pyrenean oak have a protected conservation status and cannot be felled without dispensation from national park authorities. Nevertheless, controlled logging is allowed every year with the felled trees used to supply firewood to local mountain villages.

The westernmost area of the mountain range shows a change in species distribution and variety, with a predominance of stone pine (Pinus pinea) in place of scots-pine, and Portuguese oak and Holm oak in place of Pyrenean oak due to the lower elevations and higher precipitation of the region.

==== List of plant species ====
Trees
European black pine, maritime pine, Scots pine and mountain pine; holly, alder, maple, hazel, boxwood, beech, holm oak, Portuguese oak, Pyrenean oak, savin junipers, rowan and yew.
Shrubs
tree heath, French lavender, common juniper, bearberry, fern, rockroses, common hawthorn, Fabaceae, boiss, rosemary and thyme.
Prevalent pine grove fungi
morel, saffron milk cap, Lepiota, chanterelle and king trumpet mushroom.

=== Fauna ===
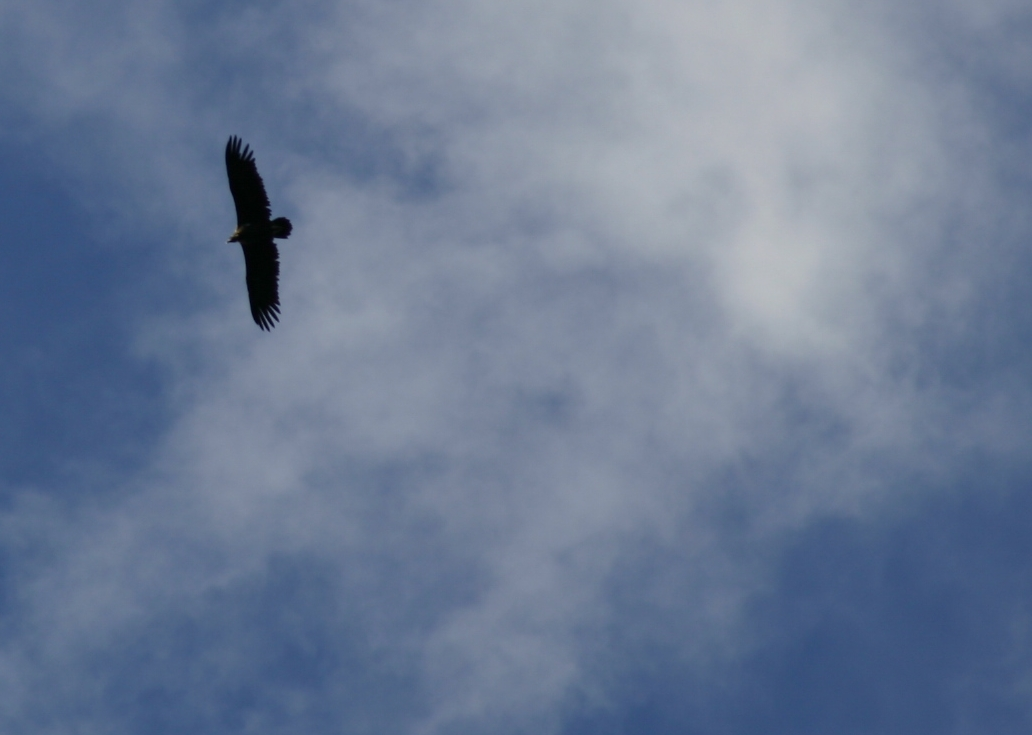
Eurasian black vulture.

As might be expected in such an important ecosystem, there is a great variety of wildlife, with mammals such as Iberian ibex, roe deer, fallow deer, wild boar, badger, various types of weasel, European wild cat, fox and hare among others. Birds are also well represented with such specialities as citril finch and crested tit as well as the usual waterfowl, especially in the Embalse de Santillana (Santillana reservoir). Birds of prey include the impressive Spanish imperial eagle and Eurasian black vulture. In fact, the animal species inhabiting the Guadarramas represent 45% of the fauna of Spain and 18% of those in Europe as a whole.

The Guadarramas are also a migration route for many species of bird including crane and black stork. Endangered species that inhabit the range include Spanish imperial eagle and the Iberian wolf.

==== List of animal species ====
Reptiles and amphibians
Various snakes both smooth and viperous, the Iberian endemic mountain lizard (Iberolacerta cyreni), alpine newt and fire salamander

Mammals
Squirrel, weasel, Iberian ibex, rabbit, roe deer, genet, boar, hare, garden dormouse, Iberian wolf, badger and fox

Birds
Citril finch, Iberian pied flycatcher, southern grey shrike, European bee-eater, hoopoe, short-toed treecreeper, jay, great tit, Eurasian woodcock, wren, chough, crested tit, blue tit, kingfisher, white-throated dipper, blackbird, firecrest, golden oriole, European robin

Birds of prey
Golden eagle, booted eagle and short-toed eagle, Eurasian black vulture and griffon vulture, eagle owl, tawny owl and little owl, peregrine falcon, red kite and both common and honey buzzard

Waterfowl
Mallard, coot, grey heron and little and great crested grebe

== Climate ==
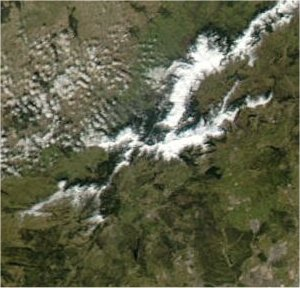
Satellite photo of the snow-capped peaks

The Guadarramas have climatic features, characterized by considerable temperatures changes between summer and winter and a very dry summer. But, as in any mountainous zone, the climate on the mountains proper changes markedly with increases in height, and can be differentiated into discrete climatic zones.

Between 800m and 1,400m, the average annual temperature varies from 9 °C to 13 °C, with a summer high of 28 °C and winter low of -3 °C. Average annual precipitation is between 500 and 800 mm, predominately in non-summer months. At this elevation, much of the precipitation falls as snow, between December and February, although there are always exceptions, and the snow rarely remains unmelted for more than three days. It is in this region that all cities and the majority of people live; this also means that of all distinguished elevations, it is the most susceptible to damage from human traffic and intrusion.

Between 1,400 and 2,000 m, the average annual temperature is 6-9 °C, with a summer high of 25 °C and winter low of -8 °C. Average annual precipitation increases with the height to 700–1,300 mm, again primarily during the non-summer season in the form of snow, but between December and April. Much of the snow remains on the ground for the duration of the winter, especially on the range's north slope.

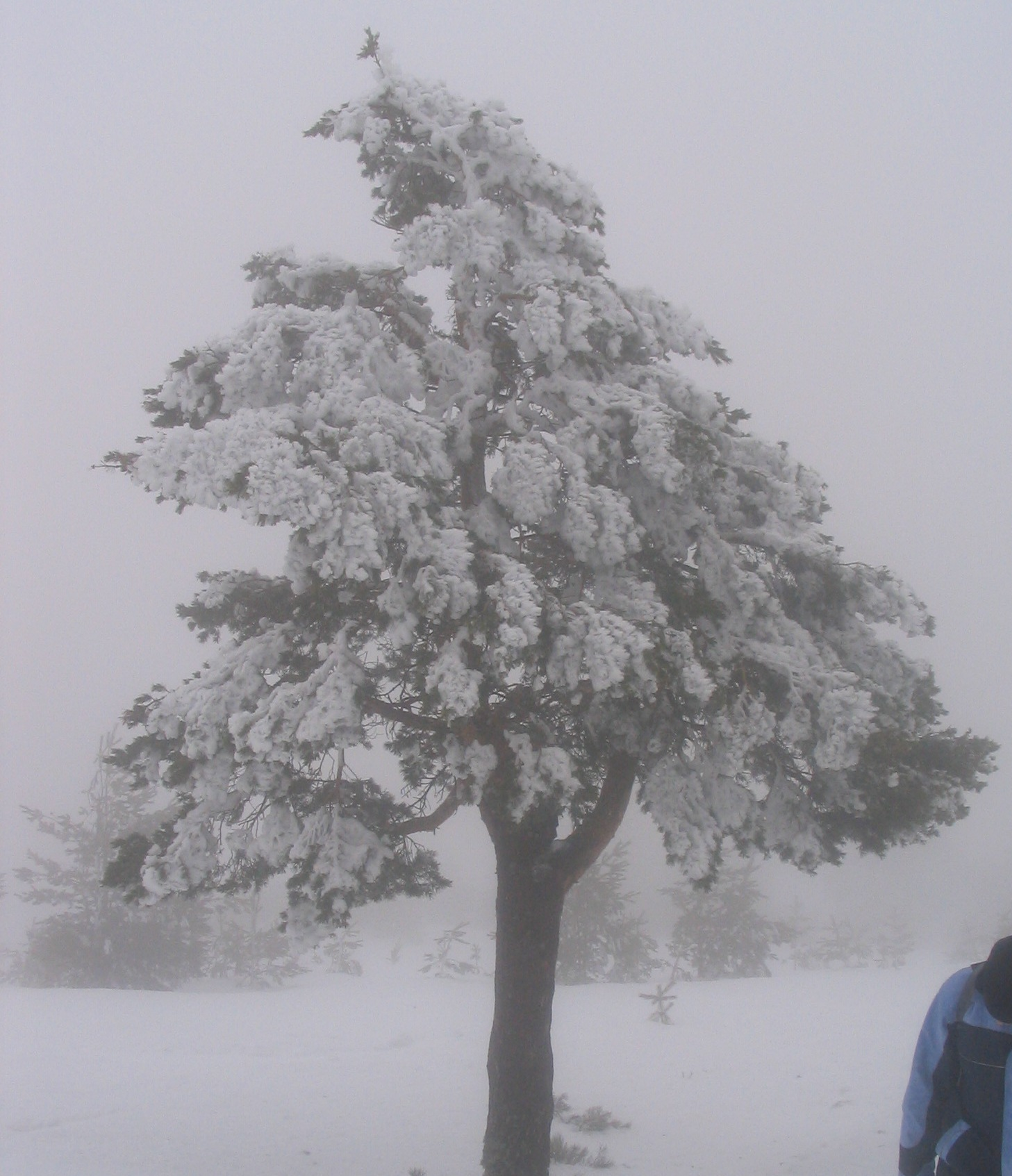
Ice-covered pine tree; the result of an ice fog.

Between 2,000 and 2,428 m, the average annual temperature is between 4-6 °C, with a summer high of 20 °C and a winter low of -12 °C. Average annual precipitation is between 1,200 and 2,500 mm, mostly snowfall between November and May which remains all winter and into the spring.

In summary, the climate of the Guadarramas is quite humid, more so than that of the rest of the Meseta Central (Central Plateau), and generally cold, increasing with elevation. In the peaks the wind is usually very intense and thunderstorms in the mountains are more frequent than in the plateau.

=== Average temperatures by elevation ===
Elevation	Temperature in winter (day/night)	Temperature in spring and autumn (day/night)	Temperature in summer (day/night)
2,428 m - 2,000 m	-1 °C / -9 °C	8 °C / -3 °C	20 °C / 5 °C
2,000 m - 1,400 m	3 °C / -3 °C	11 °C / 5 °C	23 °C / 7 °C
1,400 m - 800 m	6 °C / 0 °C	15 °C / 7 °C	26 °C / 11 °C

== Through routes ==
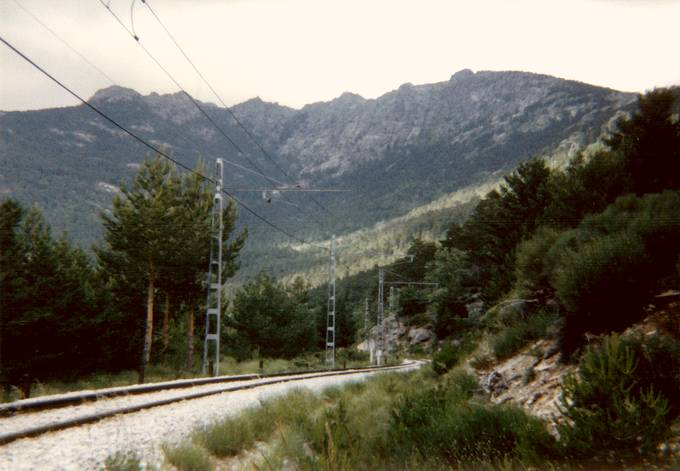
Mountain railway pass, with the Siete Picos (Seven Peaks) in the background.

As it forms a natural barrier, the Guadarramas is crossed by important routes through the mountains linking the north and south of the Iberian Peninsula. The routes date back to Roman times with the construction of their famous roads, one of which starts in the town of Cercedilla, crosses the mountains and terminates at the Fuenfría Pass. Although the road is still present with some original stone, it was rendered obsolete by roads built during the mid-18th century: the Guadarrama Pass, or "del León" route, serviced by national highway six, running from Madrid to Coruña (although another freeway, AP-6, which tunnels through the mountains, can also be used); the Navacerrada Pass highway passage between Madrid and Segovia; and the Somosierra pass, through which runs the Autovía del Norte, along with the Madrid to Irun railway.

The mountains are crossed by separate rail routes between Madrid and Ávila, Segovia and Burgos, connecting the capital to the north of the country. These lines are already considered antiquated, and will be partially replaced with the new high speed Alta Velocidad Española ("Spanish High Speed") trains, with tunnels between Miraflores de la Sierra and Segovia. The AVE can achieve speeds of up to 300 km/h on dedicated tracks. The AVE route between Madrid and Segovia is already open, and the network is slowly being expanded further north.

== History ==
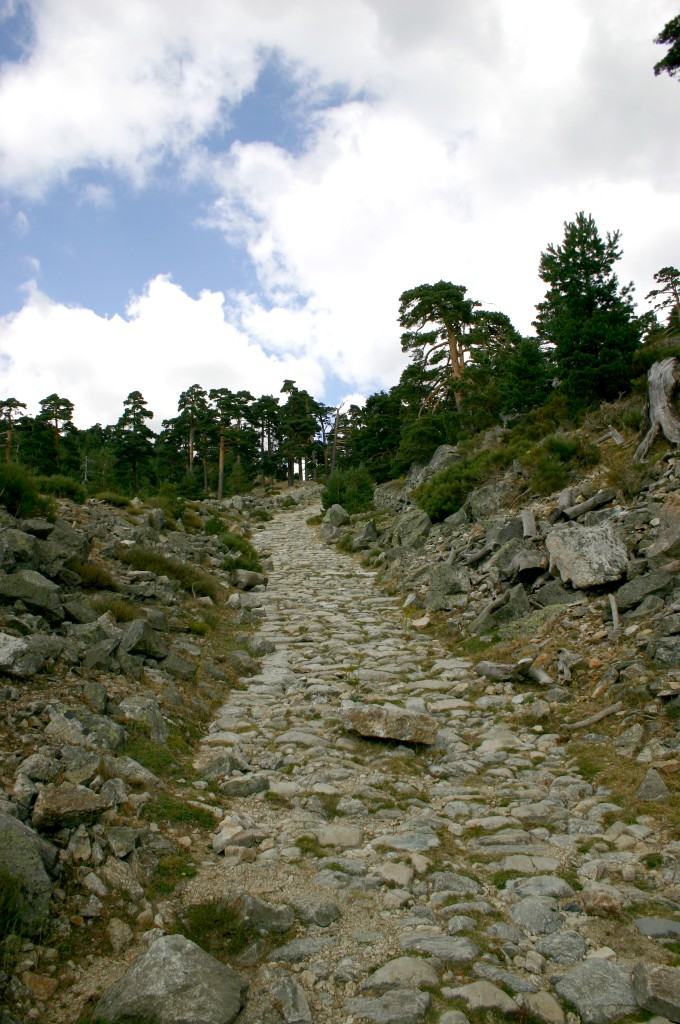
Roman roadway transecting the Fuenfría valley

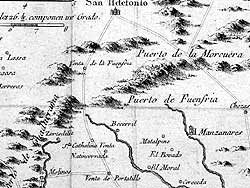
Map, c. 1760

For much of its history, the central part of the range – including the forests and grasslands on both sides of the mountains – was associated with the city of Segovia, at least as far back as its Roman control under the name of Segóbriga. However, after the creation of the province of Madrid to meet the requirements of the Spanish Court, the political designation of the mountains was distributed between the two provinces. Today the range is more often associated with Madrid, given that city's prominence as Spain's capital.

The Guadarramas' role as a natural barrier has been of importance in many of the armed conflicts that have afflicted Spain. For centuries, the range constituted a border between the Christian kingdoms to the north and Muslims kingdoms to the south, during the times of Reconquest. The legacy of that epoch can be seen in the splendid medieval walled cities occupying both sides of the mountains, such as Buitrago del Lozoya and Manzanares el Real in Madrid, and the Castillo de Pedraza in Segovia.

In 1808, during the Peninsular War fought by Spain against invaders from France, the Battle of Somosierra took place at the range's Somosierra Pass, where the Spanish were defeated by Napoleonic troops composed principally of Polish lancers. Likewise, in the Battle of Guadarrama during the Spanish Civil War (1936-1939) the range comprised an important front with skirmishes fought in the mountain passes between the loyalist and the rebel faction. Today, trenches and gun emplacements still survive along the line of the mountains' summits.

The Guadarramas, as a result of their proximity to high population centres of cultural and educational importance, was one of the first areas of Spain where natural resources and the study of nature came to be valued, both for economic and educational reasons. This culminated in the establishment of the Institución Libre de Enseñanza (Free Institution of Education) in 1876, which advocated an assimilation into Madrid's cultural values of the nearby mountain range's natural beauty. By the 1920s, there was a call to declare the entire range a protected national park; a notion that is still unrealized but has support today.

=== Monuments and structures of interest ===
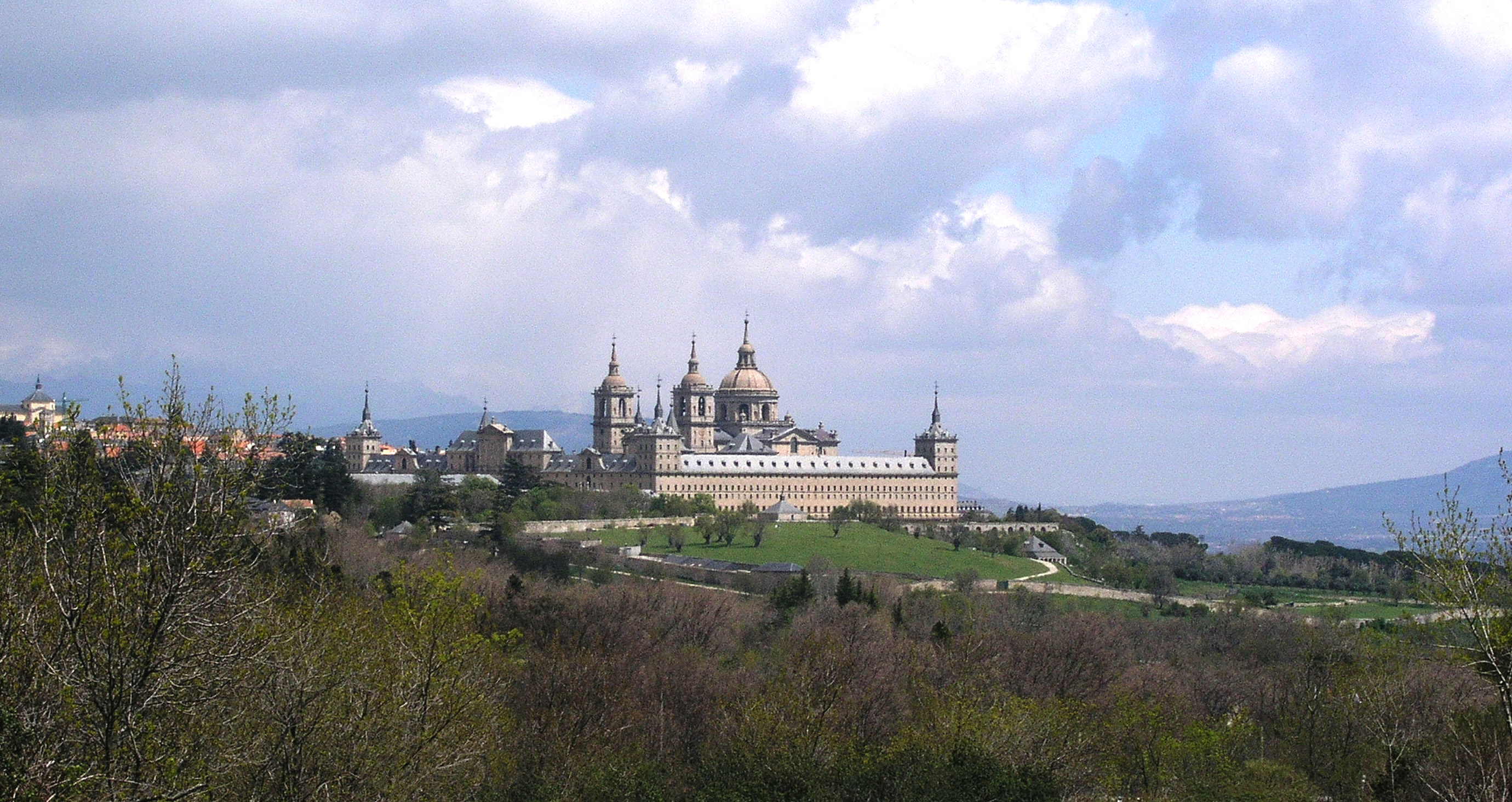
El Escorial monastery.

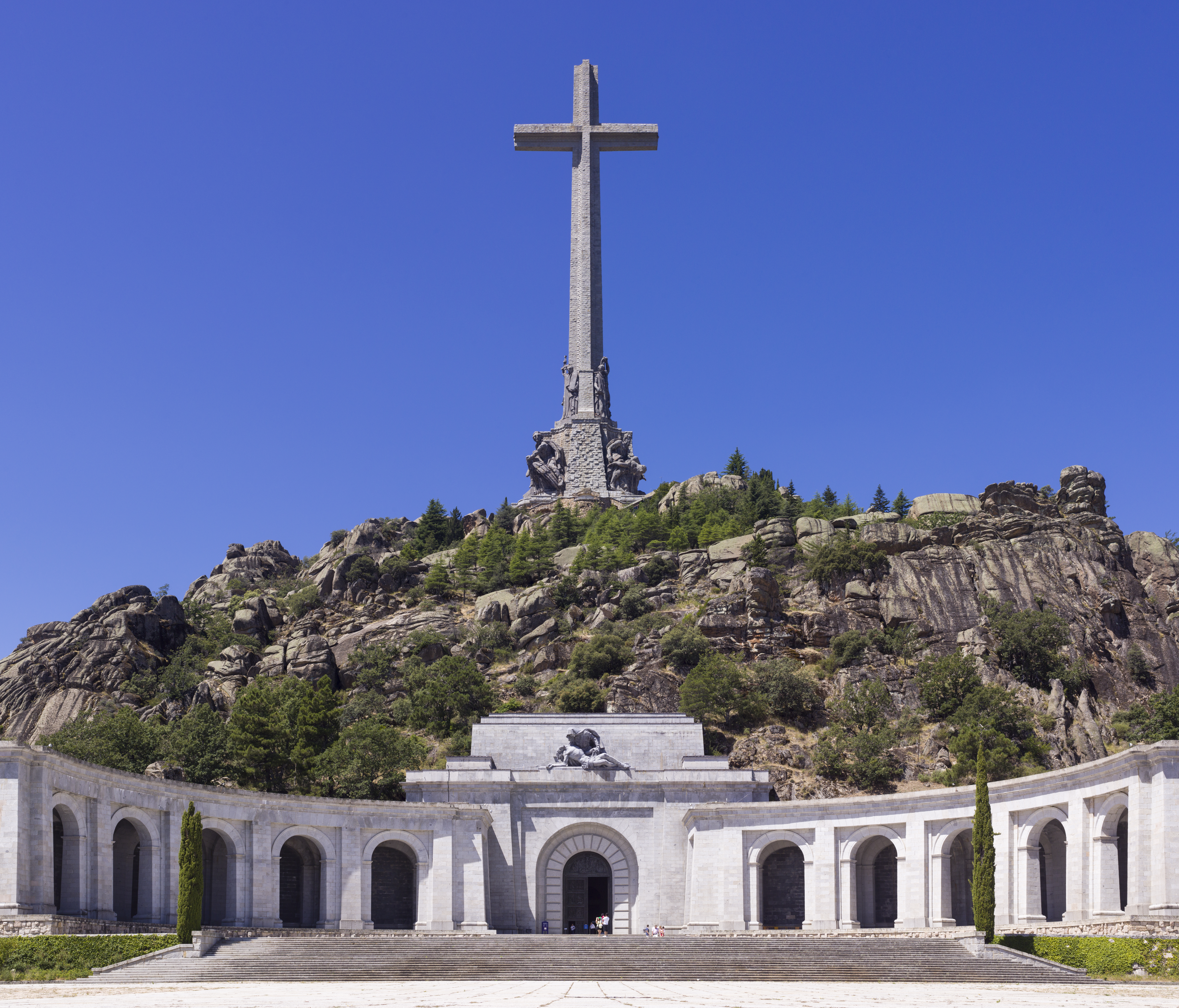
Santa Cruz del Valle de los Caídos.

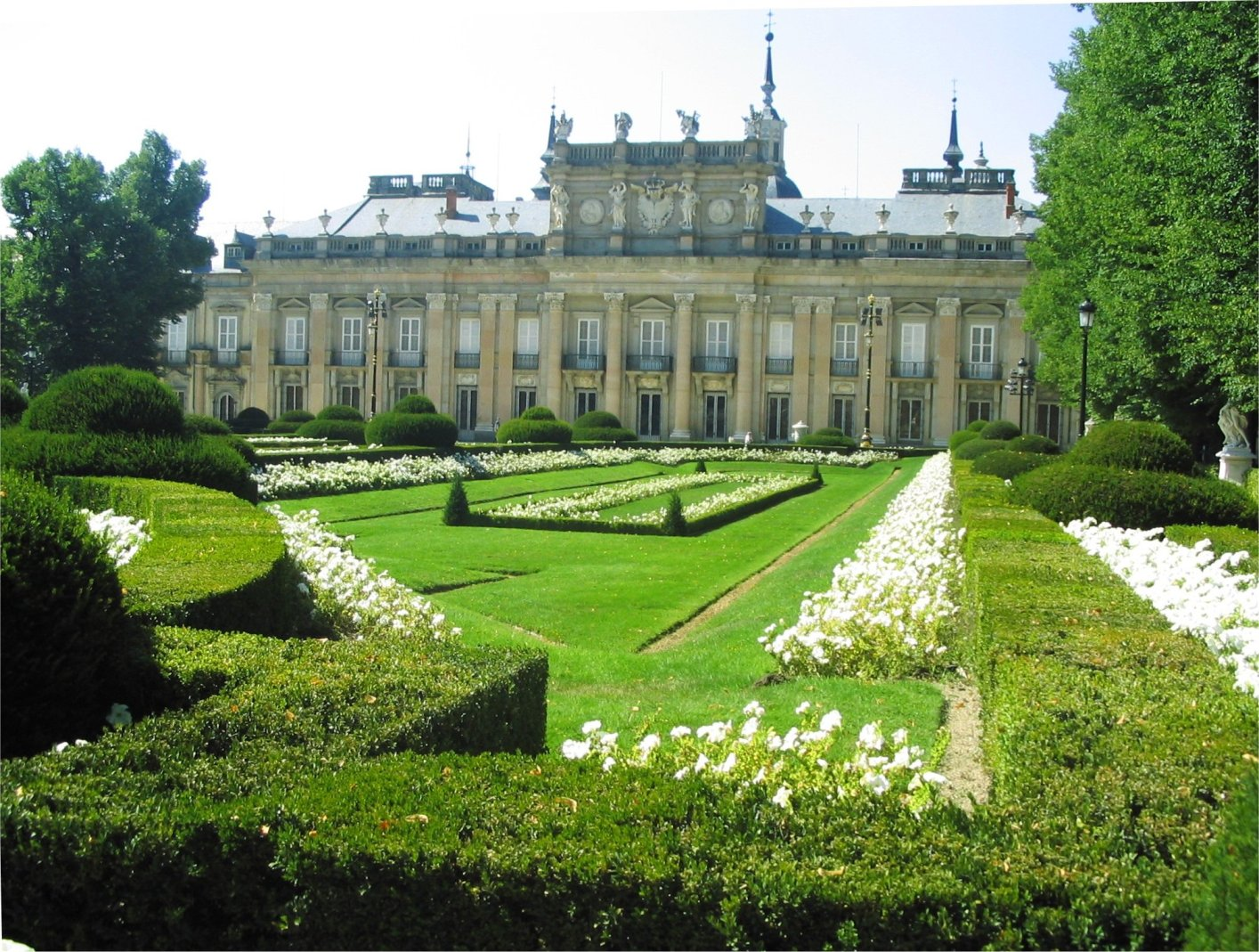
The Palacio Real de la Granja de San Ildefonso.

The scenic landscape, mild summer climate, and proximity to Madrid and Segovia have led to the construction of numerous notable buildings and monuments along the slopes of the Sierra de Guadarrama.

The Royal Monastery of San Lorenzo de El Escorial, is an immense palace built to commemorate the Battle of St. Quentin (1557), El Escorial is also an Augustinian monastery, museum, and library complex. It is in the town of San Lorenzo de El Escorial. Designed by the architects Juan Bautista de Toledo and Juan de Herrera in an austere Herrerian classical style, and built from 1563 to 1584, it is shaped as a grid in memory of the martyrdom of Saint Lawrence. The complex has an enormous store of art, including masterworks by Titian, Tintoretto, El Greco, Velázquez, Rogier van der Weyden, Paolo Veronese, Alonso Cano, José de Ribera, Claudio Coello and others; its library containing thousands of priceless ancient manuscripts; and the complex has been designated a UNESCO World Heritage Site.

In the north face of Monte Abantos, surrounded by thick pine groves, is the Santa Cruz del Valle de los Caídos ("Holy Cross of the Valley of the Fallen"). Conceived by General Francisco Franco to honour those killed during the Spanish Civil War, the monument contains beneath it the remains of 40,000 fallen soldiers, as well as a basilica in which Franco was interred. Above rises a massive granite cross — 150 m high — which is visible from as far away as 50 km.

In Rascafría, in the centre of the Lozoya valley, lies the Monasterio de Santa María de El Paular ("Monastery of Santa María of Paular"). Surrounded by scenic mountainscapes, the monastery features a large cloister and dates to the late 14th century. It was constructed at the behest of king Henry II of Castile and in 1876 was declared a Spanish National Monument.

Manzanares Castle is a medieval fort in the municipality of Manzanares el Real, at the foot of La Pedriza. It is composed of several cylindrical towers and dates to the 15th century.

In the town of Pedraza, is a namesake medieval castle, Castillo de Pedraza. The citadel rises on a hill protecting the town. It dates to the 14th century and an expansion during the 16th century. Although at one time in disrepair, the castle was restored in modern times and is in a good state of preservation. The structure is protected on all sides by its original, ancient walls, lending a medieval ambience to the surroundings.

In the municipality of San Ildefonso in Castile and León lies the Baroque-style Palacio Real de la Granja de San Ildefonso, a royal residence actually used in summer by Spanish nobility. It was commissioned by Philip V of Spain in 1724. The palace's extensive gardens feature numerous sculptures of mythological beings, which are highly prized for their artistic value. The gardens were based on those King Philip V had known during his childhood in the French royal court.

== Protected zones ==
Guadarrama National Park

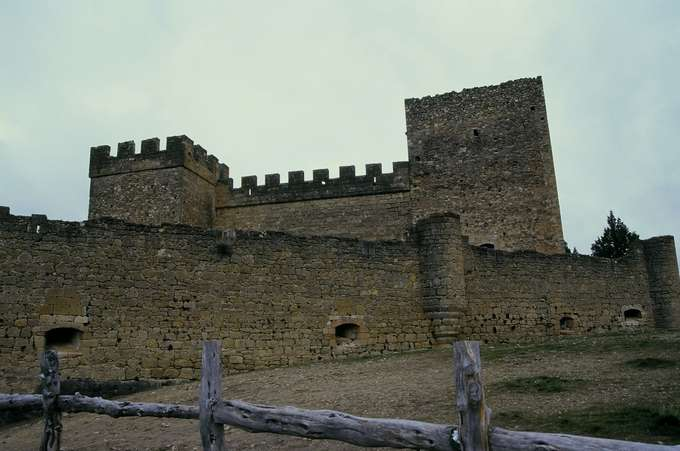
Castillo de Pedraza.

For some years, a proposal to designate the range as a national park (Parque Nacional de Guadarrama) has been under discussion. The aim was to protect the range from degradation caused by the heavy human traffic as a result of its proximity to large cities such as Madrid. The law that regulates the approved national park was published on June 26, 2013.

Formerly two high traffic areas of the Guadarrama mountains have achieved protected nature reserve status:

- The Parque Regional de la Cuenca Alta del Manzanares ("High River Basin Regional Park of the Manzanares"), located in the Community of Madrid was the first Sierra de Guadarrama zone to receive protected status. When the designation was first granted it included only La Pedriza (an area including a number of peaks, valleys and rivers in the Guadarramas), but later it was extended to cover the Monte de El Pardo — a densely forested area to the north of Madrid, covering more than 470 square kilometres (181 mile²).
- The Parque Natural de la Cumbre, Circo y Lagunas de Peñalara ("Peñalara's Summit, Cirques and Lakes Natural Park"). The natural park is much smaller and more recently designated than the preceding one, only covering the tallest part of the massif of Peñalara (at 2,428 m the highest mountain in the Sierra de Guadarrama) and one of few glaciers formations of the whole Sistema Central, with three small cirques, two moraines, and almost twenty glacial lakes.

== Myths and legends ==
Over the centuries, several myths and legends about the region have developed:

The Shepherd's Chasm
It is believed that in the mountains nearby San Lorenzo de El Escorial, a secret treasure cache lies buried. Many have prospected in the region, searching for this illusive trove.

This legend holds that a certain Rafael Corraliza, who managed the rich financial affairs of the El Escorial monastery, was lured by greed to plunder the monastery's treasury of doubloons. Corraliza then absconded, heading for sanctuary in Portugal. He stole out at night, taking a mountain footpath that led to the nearest village, Robledondo. However, upon attempting to traverse the mountain area known as the Shepherd's Chasm, named for a deep mountain crevasse, he was caused by a saint watching over the monastery to fall into the chasm, which swallowed up both him and the stolen gold. In the course of time, the abyss was covered with branches and stones for fear that cattle or any person could suffer the same fate as Corraliza.

The Boulder of the Dead
The name of this legend comes from a namesake peculiar rock formation in La Pedriza. The story is that a group of three brigands kidnap a young woman of a rich and powerful Madrid family. While the chief of the band is temporarily away, the two remaining bandits decide to rape the young woman. Upon the chief's unexpected return, he attempts to throw each of them over the cliff above the namesake boulder as quick justice. The first is done successfully, but the second grabs the leg of the ringleader as they struggle at the brink of the precipice, and they both plummet to their deaths on the rocks below. According to local people, for a time, the corpses of the three bandits could be seen in a crack of the rocks.

== See also ==
- Sistema Central
- Peñalara Nature Reserve
- Guadarrama National Park
- Guadarrama Pass
- Valsain Mountains
- Peñalara
- La Pedriza
- Imperial Route of the Community of Madrid
- Puerto de Cotos
- Bola del Mundo
- Montón de Trigo

== Bibliography ==
- Fidalgo García, Pablo & Martín Espinosa, Agustín (2005). Atlas Estadístico de la Comunidad de Madrid 2005. Instituto de Estadística de la Comunidad de Madrid. ISBN 84-451-2786-1
- Pliego Vega, Domingo (2005). Guadarrama. 50 excursiones fáciles. Ediciones Desnivel. ISBN 84-96192-83-0
- Rincón, Manuel (1987). Caminar por la Sierra de Guadarrama. Editorial Barrabes. ISBN 84-95744-38-4
- Sánchez Martínez, Javier & Martínez de Pisón, Eduardo (2004). La Sierra de Guadarrama:La Imagen de una Montaña. Ediciones La Librería. ISBN 84-95889-84-6
- Vías, Julio (2004). La Sierra de Guadarrama. Biografía de un paisaje. Ediciones La Librería. ISBN 84-95889-73-0
- Zarzuela Aragón, Javier (2003). Excursiones para niños por la Sierra de Madrid. Ediciones La Librería. ISBN 84-95889-41-2
