= Peñalara =

Mountain in Spain

Penalara
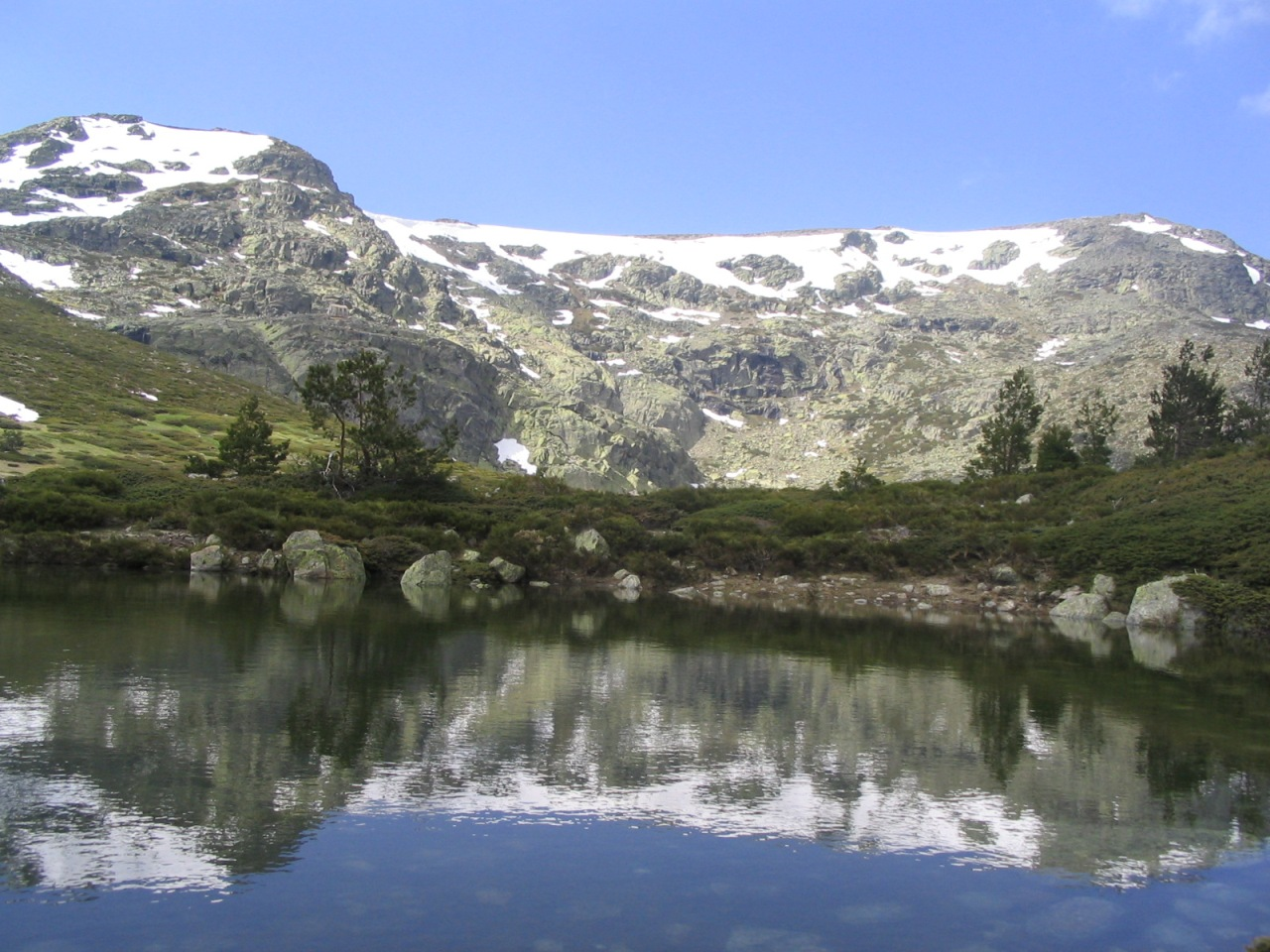
- Peñalara (right peak) and its reflection in a glacier lake.

Highest point
- Elevation: 2,428 m (7,966 ft)
- Prominence: 1,113 m (3,652 ft)
- Listing: Ribu
- Coordinates: 40°51′N 03°57′W

Geography
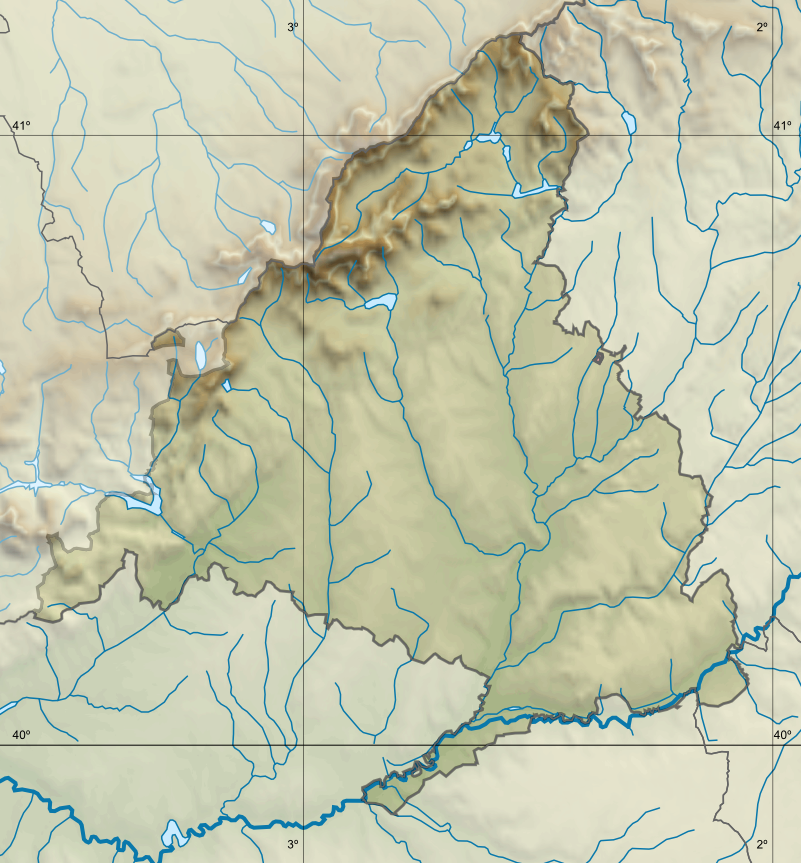
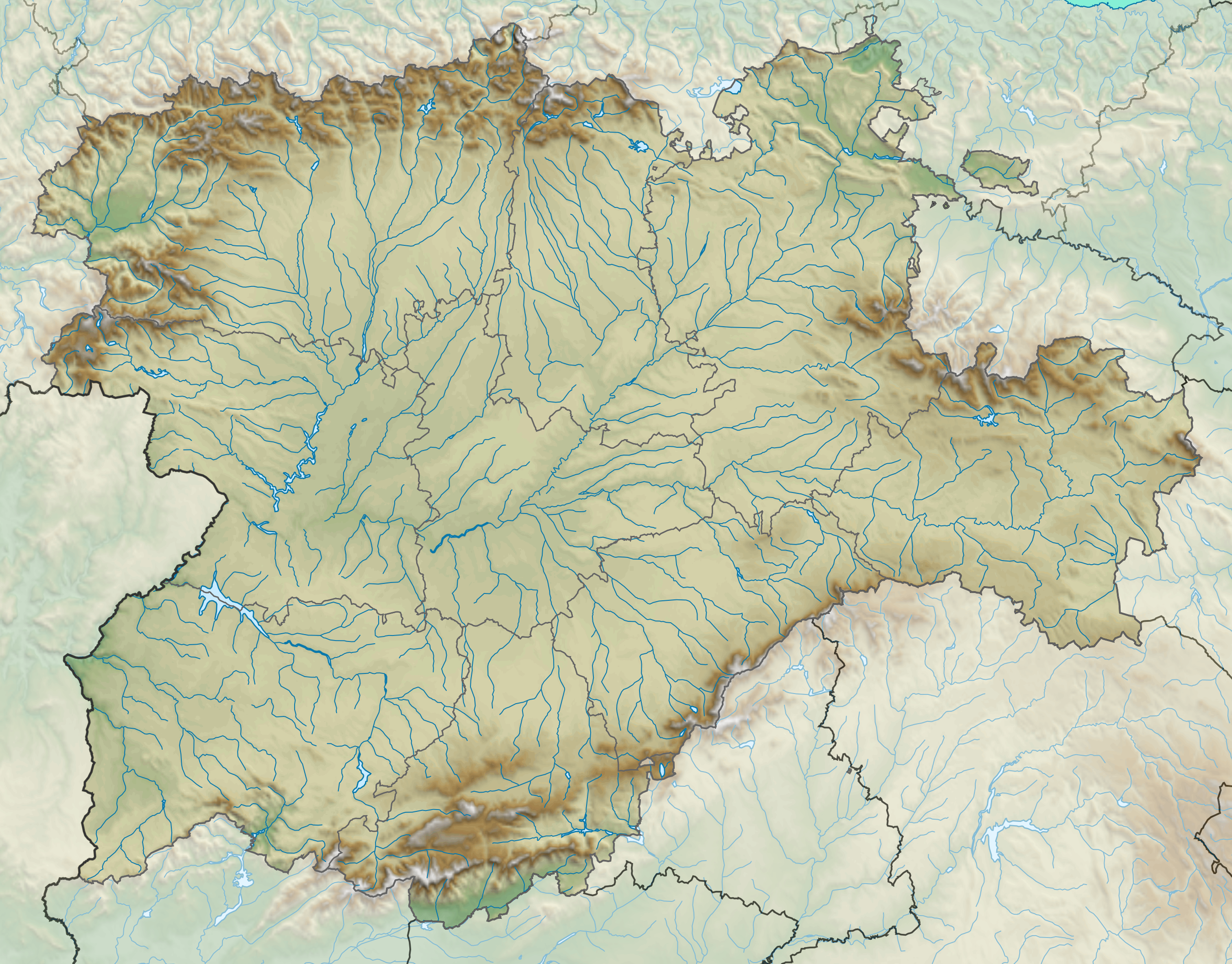
- Location within Community of Madrid Location within Castile and León Location within Spain Location within Europe
- Location: Madrid/Segovia, Spain
- Parent range: Sierra de Guadarrama

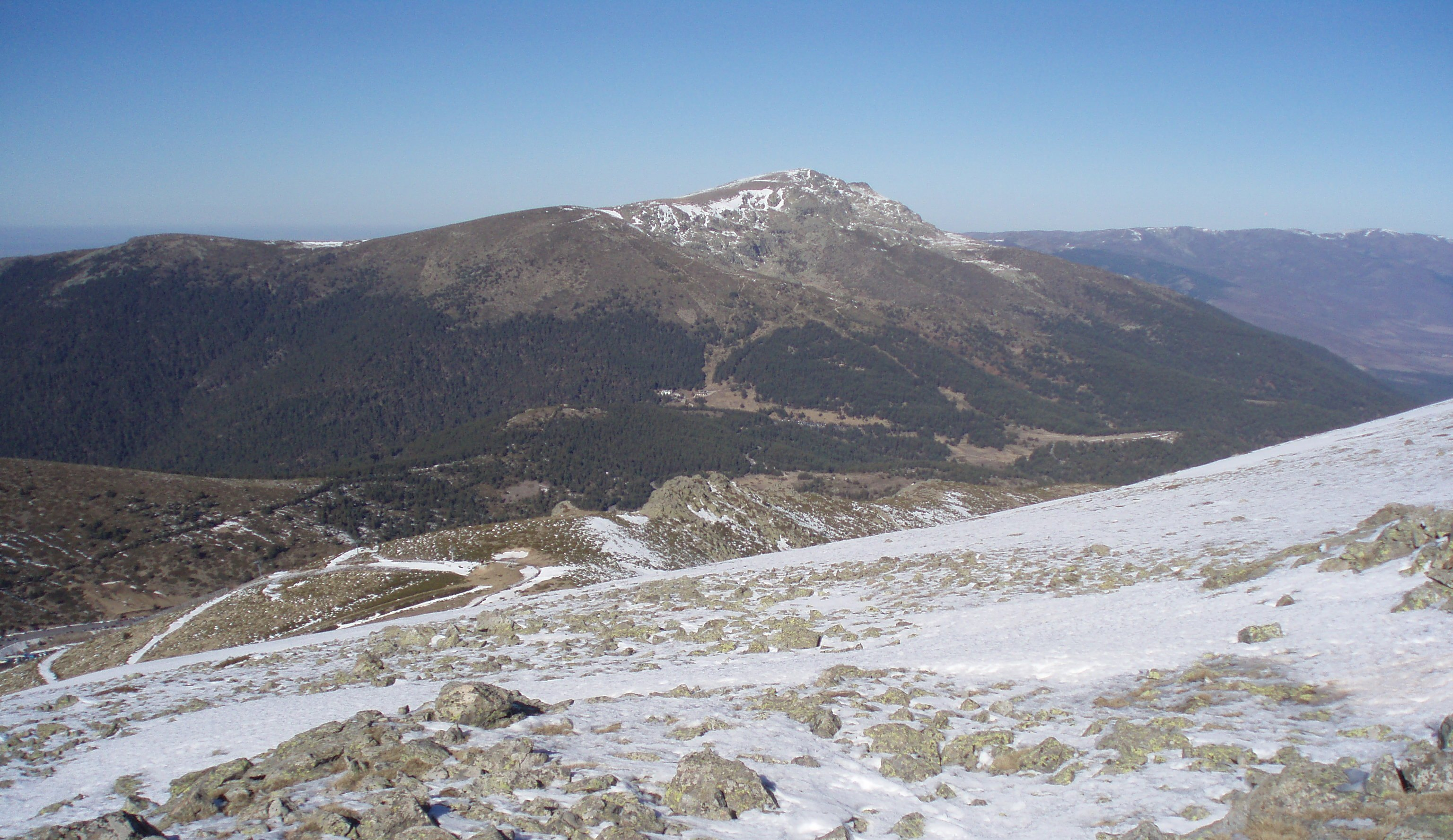
South face of Peñalara.

Peñalara is the highest mountain peak in the mountain range of Guadarrama, a subsection of Spain's larger Sistema Central mountain chain which lies at the center and divides the Iberian Peninsula. Straddling the provinces of Madrid and Segovia, Peñalara reaches a height of 2,428 metres above sea level. Consequently, it is one of the most emblematic and important peaks of the Guadarramas.

The eastern section of the mountain lies in the municipality of Rascafría in the province of Madrid, belonging to the Valle of Lozoya, and its western section is located in the Valle of Valsaín in the province of Segovia. The peak's summit is a designated natural park known as the Parque Natural de Peñalara, which features several small lakes and some steep escarpments.

The outline of Peñalara is rounded, displaying few overhangs. The hillsides of this mountain are covered with different types of vegetation, depending on the elevation. Largely undisturbed oak tree groves are found at an elevation of 1,000 to 1,300 metres. From 1,100 metres to 2,000 metres, the slopes are dominated by wild pine forests. From 2,000 metres up to the summit, the vegetation consists of more sparsely distributed, low-lying bushes particular to high elevations. The animal habitat of the mountain is made up of small mammals, a large variety of insects and various bird species such as eagles and vultures.

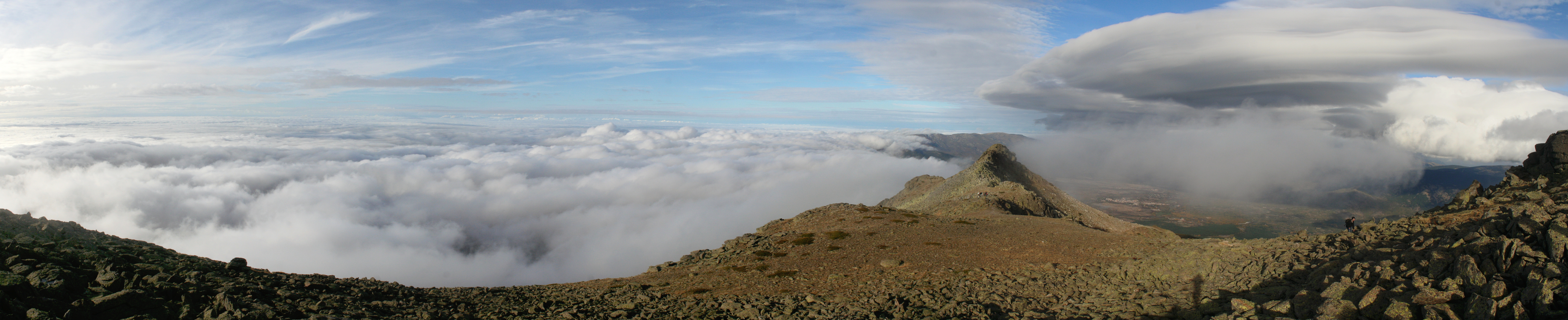
Panorama from Peñalara. In the right side Lozoya Valley can be seen.

== See also ==
- Mountain range of Guadarrama
- Peñalara Nature Reserve
- Guadarrama National Park
