= Lozoya (river) =

Tributary of the Jarama river

Coordinates: 40.8735°N 3.4550°W

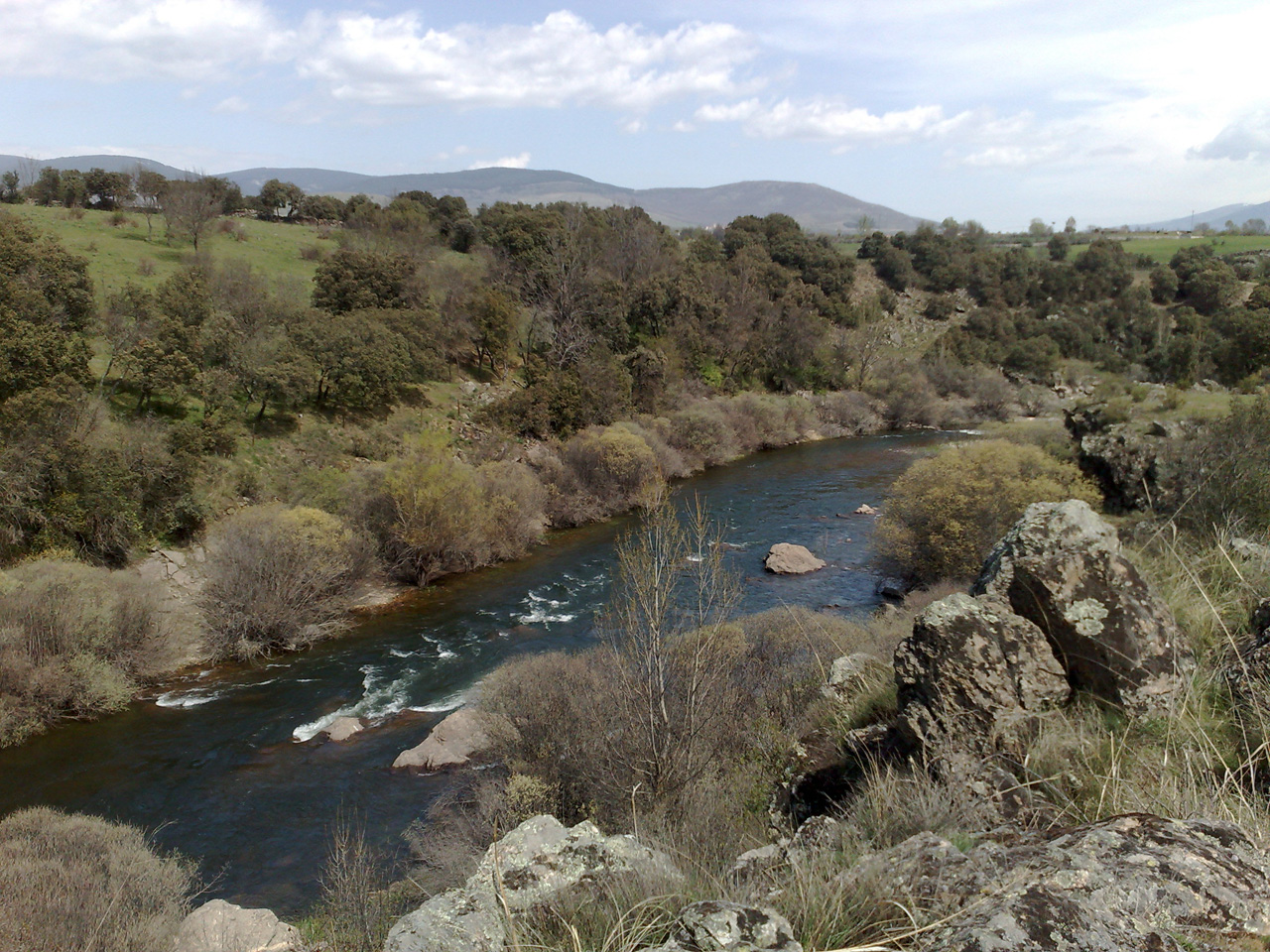
The Lozoya flowing through Buitrago.

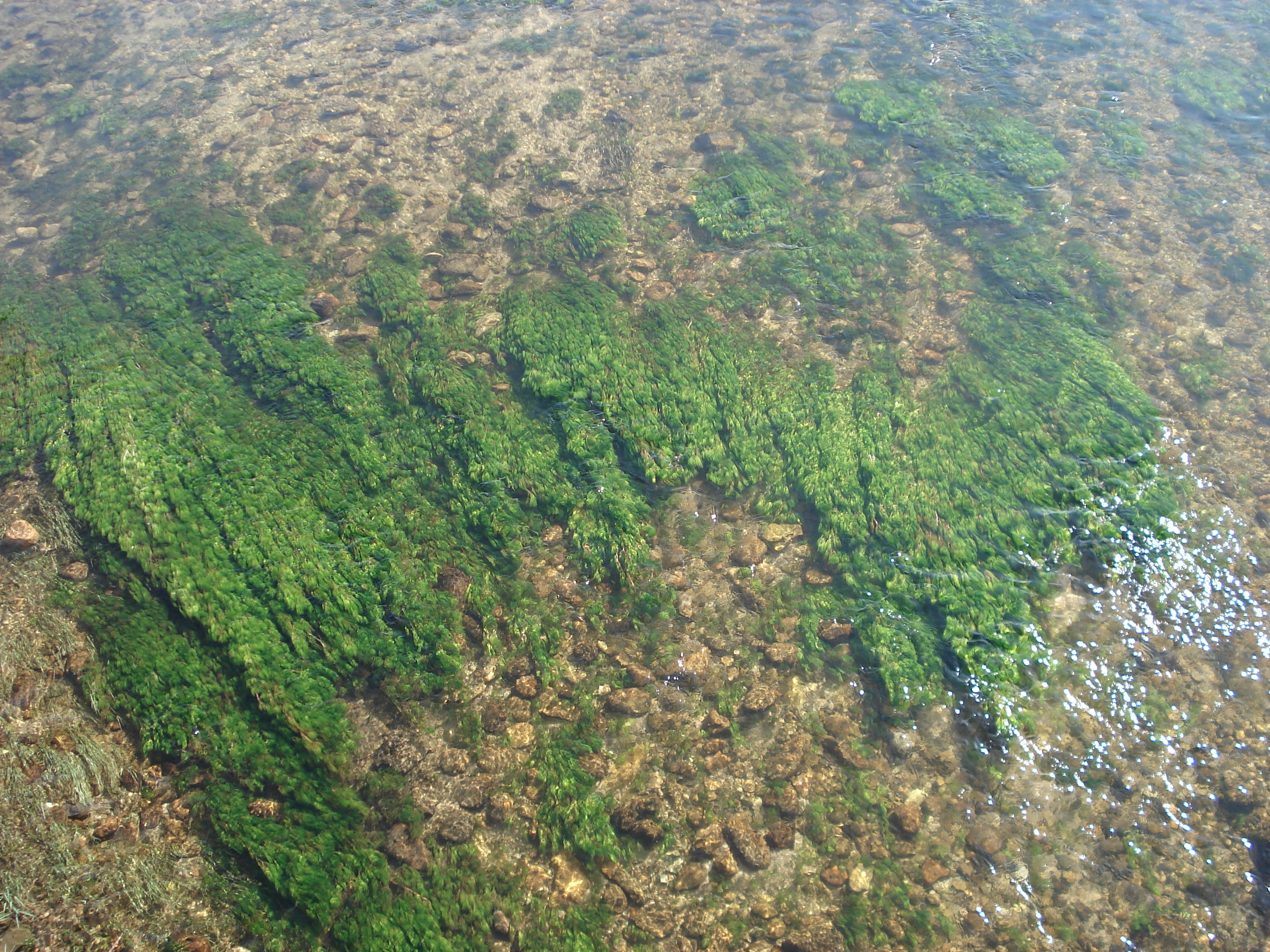
Algae on the riverbed

The Lozoya River (Spanish pronunciation: [loˈθoʝa]) is a river flowing near the centre of Spain. It originates at a high altitude in the Sistema Central and cuts downward through steep rocks to flow into the Jarama River, a major tributary of the Tajo, the longest river on the Iberian Peninsula.

== Water use ==
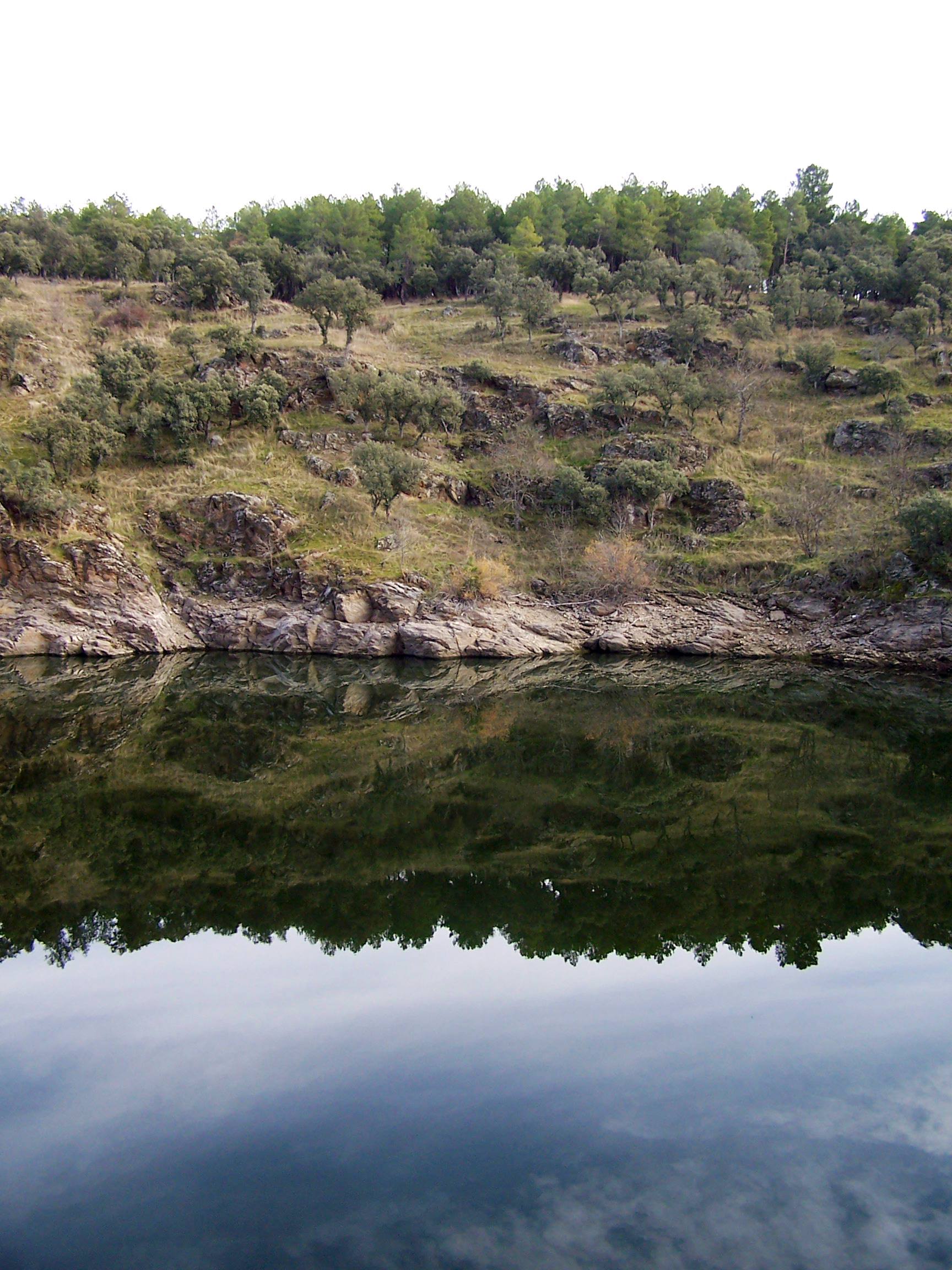
Lozoya river.

The Lozoya has been affected by the construction of several dams and reservoirs that supply almost 50 percent of the water for Madrid's metropolitan area. In fact, 50 percent of the river's length is taken up by reservoirs. Other uses of the river water such as forestry and agriculture have had much less physical impact. Because the impact of construction on the Lozoya has been so great, the river is now rated as Heavily Modified Water Body (HMWB) based on the European Synthesis Project.

== See also ==
- List of rivers of Spain
- El Atazar Dam
