= Cuenca Alta del Manzanares Regional Park =

Protected area in Spain

- IUCN category V (protected landscape/seascape)
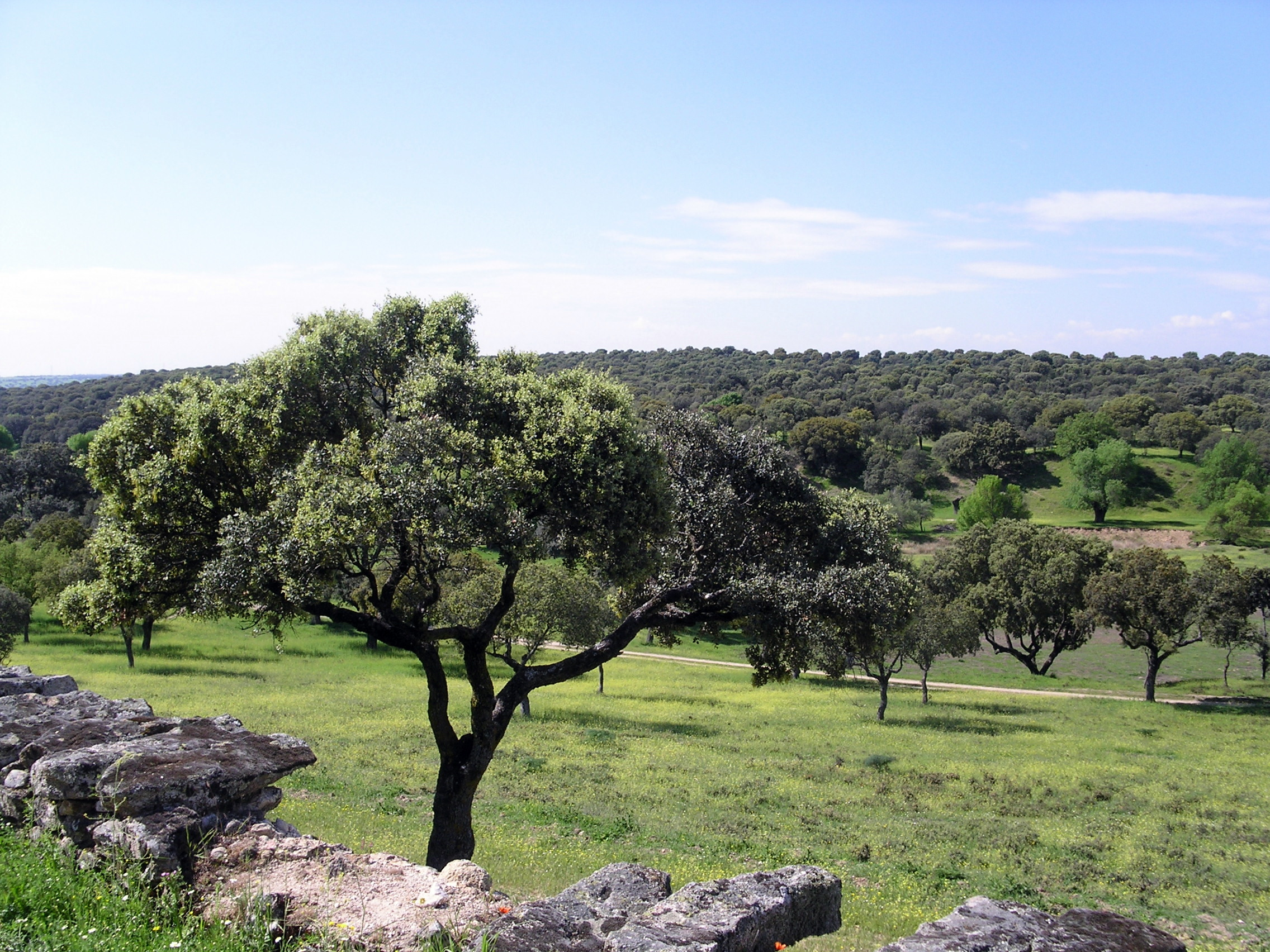
- Soto de Viñuelas zone

- Location within Spain
- Location: Spain; Soto de Viñuelas
- Coordinates: 40°42′N 3°48′W
- Area: 42 583 ha
- Established: January 23, 1985
- Governing body: Ley 1/1985 de la CdM

The Cuenca Alta del Manzanares Regional Park, created in 1985, is the natural space protected area with the largest extension in the Community of Madrid (Spain) and one of the most ecologically and scenically valuable. It is located in the northwest of the region and extends around the upper course of the Manzanares River, along 42 583 ha. Its main municipalities of reference are Manzanares el Real and Hoyo de Manzanares. Unesco declared it a Biosphere Reserve in 1992.

It is located on the southern slopes of the Sierra de Guadarrama, with the exception of Monte de El Pardo and its eastern appendix, the Soto de Viñuelas, which are located in the detritic plain, characteristic of the Southern Subplateau. It has numerous ecosystems, among which pine forests, holm oak groves, juniper groves, rockrose groves, melojares and wetlands stand out.

== Legal framework ==
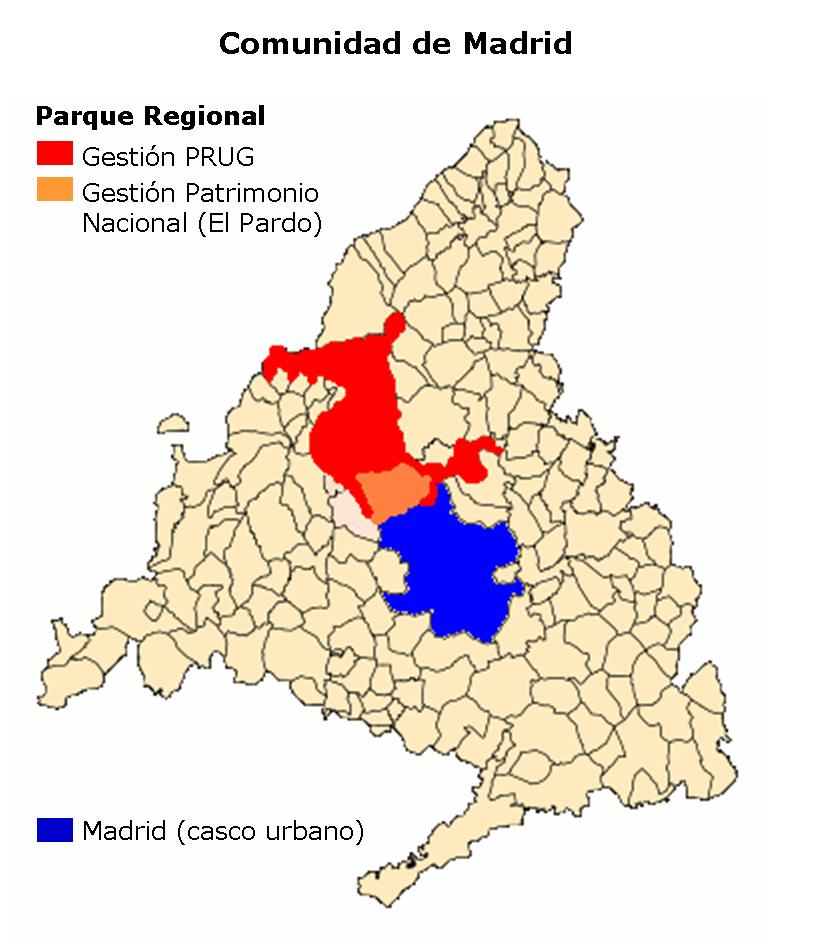
Previous borders of the regional park.

The Cuenca Alta del Manzanares Regional Park was established in 1985 by Law 1/1985, of January 23, 1985, and has undergone several subsequent modifications. The most important ones correspond to the years 1987 and 1991, when extensions were promoted.

The park has a Master Plan for Use and Management (in Spanish, Plan Rector de Uso y Gestión or PRUG), approved in 1987 and revised in 1995, which regulates the various sites included, with the exception of Monte de El Pardo, which depends on Patrimonio Nacional. This organism, which administers the assets that were in the hands of the Spanish Crown, maintains a highly protectionist and restrictive management around El Pardo and completely prevents its visit, beyond certain areas located in the southern part of the wall that borders it.

On February 15, 1993, the Cuenca Alta del Manzanares regional park was declared a Biosphere Reserve by Unesco and, later, Monte de Viñuelas, which lies to the east of the park, was recognized as a Special Protection Area for Birds (SPA). In addition, the two large reservoirs within the park, Santillana reservoir and El Pardo reservoir, are protected by Law 7/1990, of June 28, on the Protection of Reservoirs and Wetlands of the Community of Madrid.

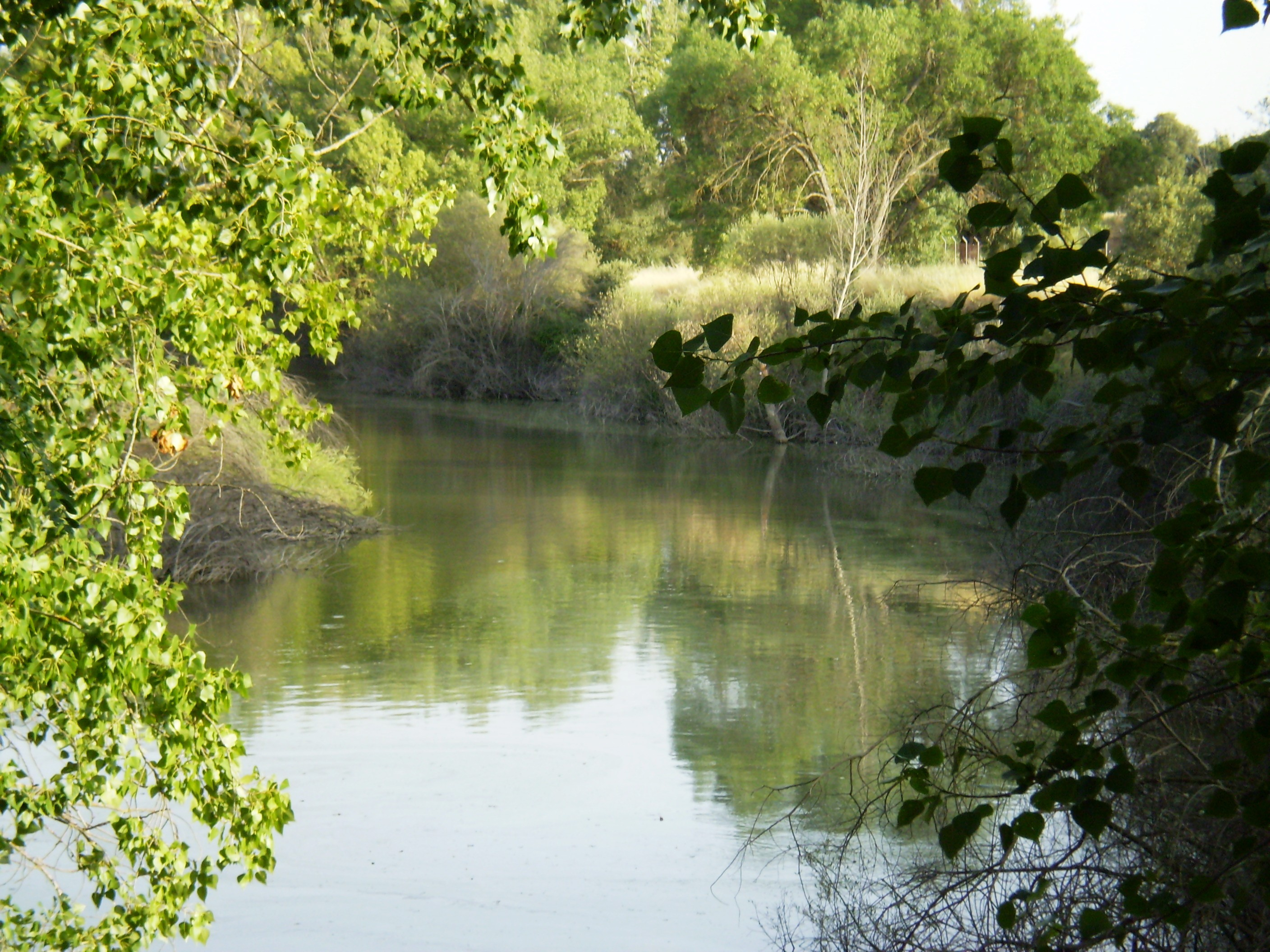
The park is articulated around the upper course of the Manzanares river. In the image, the river as it passes through the Monte de El Pardo

La Pedriza had, since 1930, a special level of protection, through the figure of Natural Site of National Interest, which was repealed in 1985 with the creation of the current park. In 1979 a nature park was created around the upper valley of the Manzanares River, with an area of 4304 ha—in practice, it was a timid extension around the protected area of La Pedriza—which can be considered the closest predecessor of the Cuenca Alta del Manzanares regional park.

The ownership of the land corresponded in 65%, to individuals, 22% belongs to the Community of Madrid and 7% to the Spanish State. The remaining 6% was in the hands of the different integrated municipalities. This natural area is twinned with the national parks of Sierra de La Culata and Sierra Nevada, both in Venezuela, within an international collaboration and exchange program.

In 2013, following the declaration of the Guadarrama National Park, the boundaries of the Cuenca Alta del Manzanares regional park were affected: the parts of the Peñalara Natural Park not absorbed by the national park were incorporated into the regional park (an area in the municipality of Rascafría), however the regional park also experienced surface area losses in favor of the national park, as the southern slope of the Cuerda Larga and the La Pedriza site. As of 2018 its extension would be 42 583 ha.

== Urban geography ==
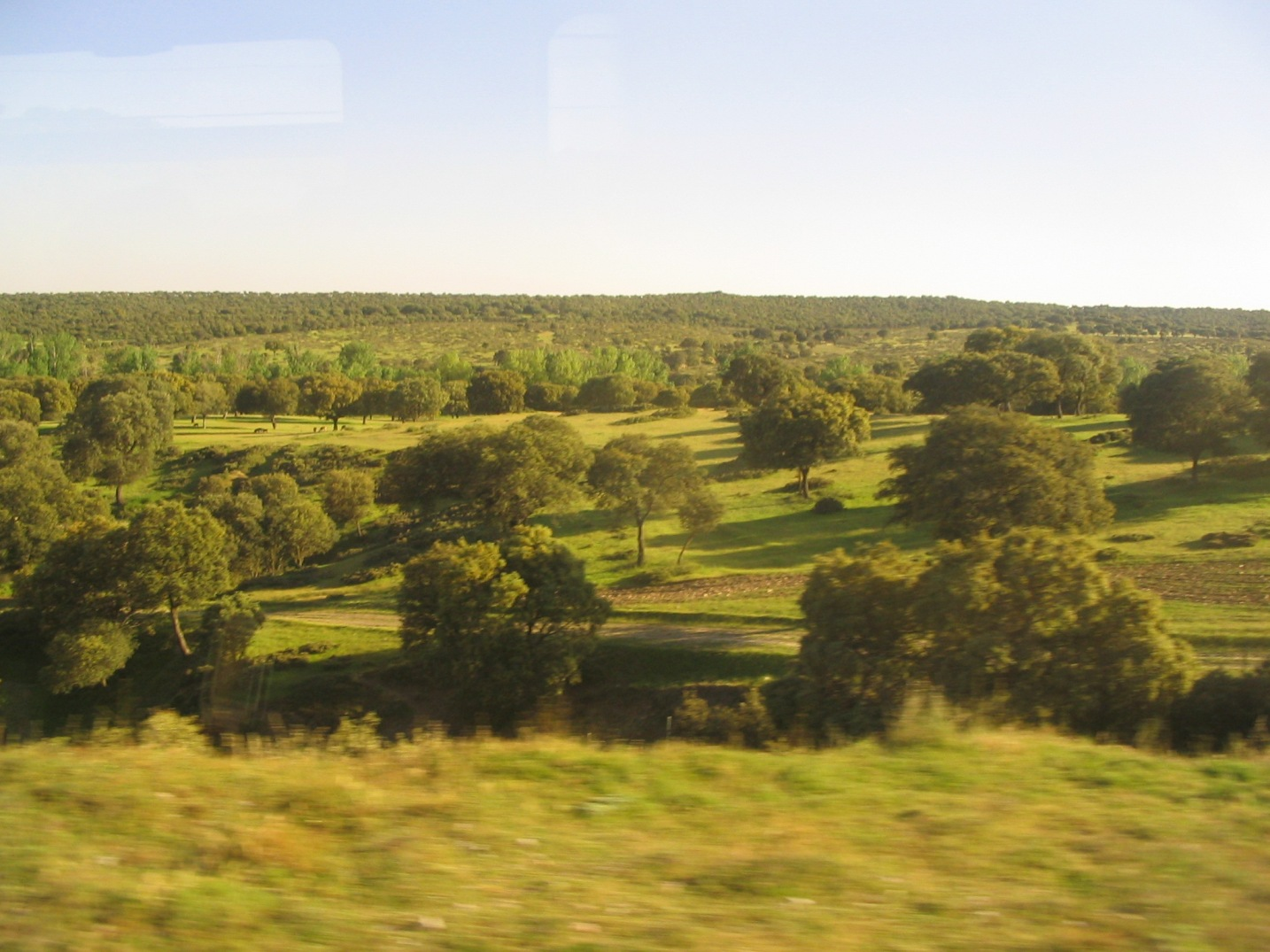
Monte de El Pardo is located in the south of the park.

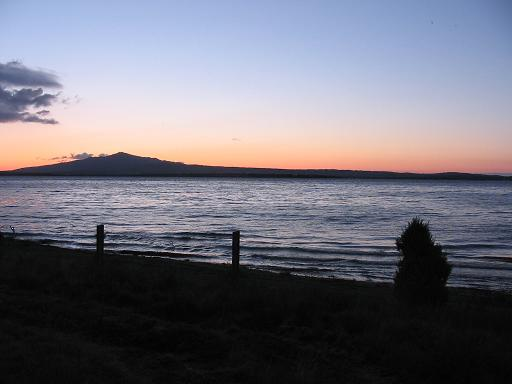
The Santillana reservoir is protected by the Law for the Protection of Reservoirs and Wetlands of the Community of Madrid.

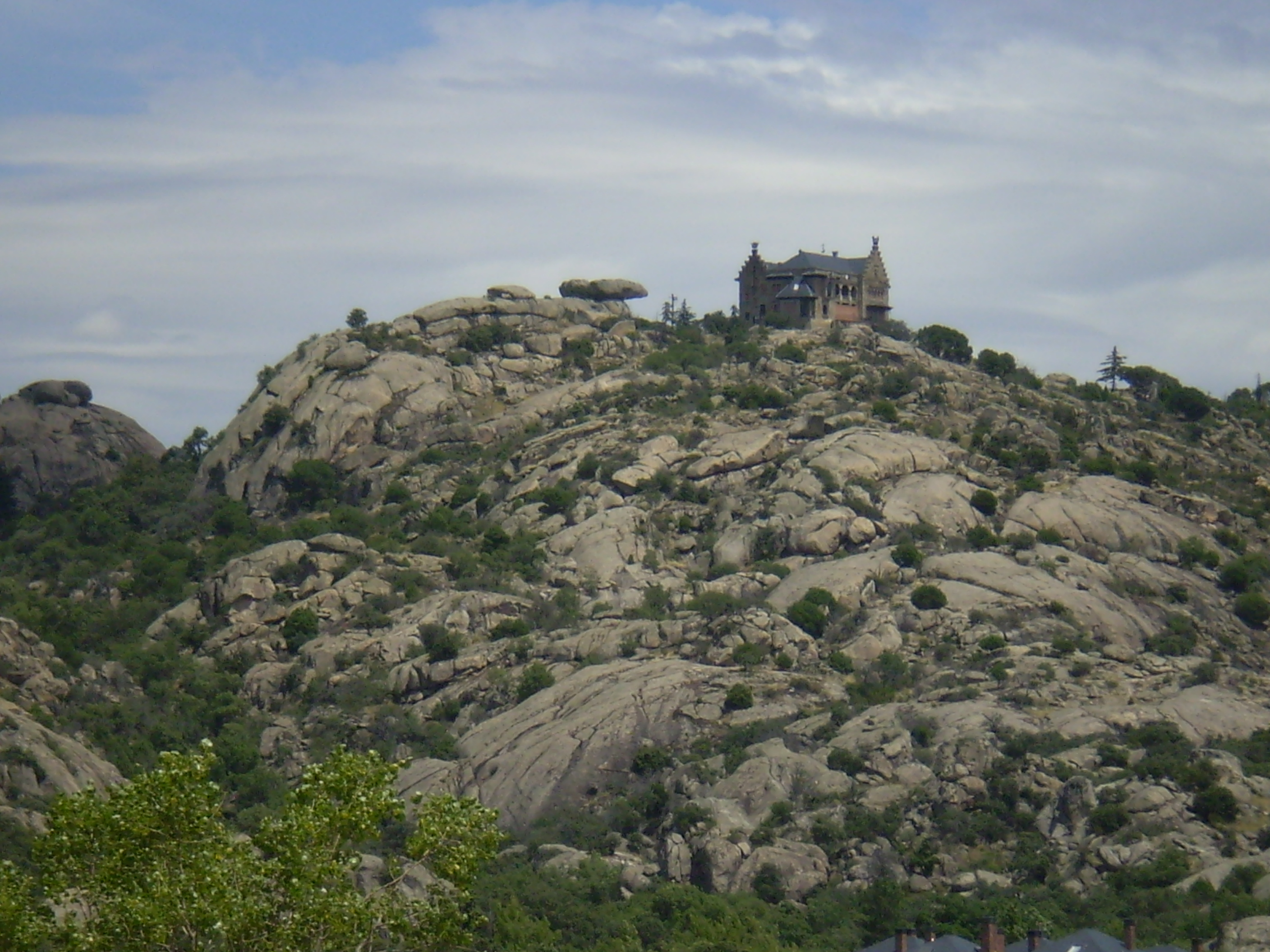
Granitic scree in the Canto del Pico estate, in Torrelodones, in the foothills of the Sierra del Hoyo.

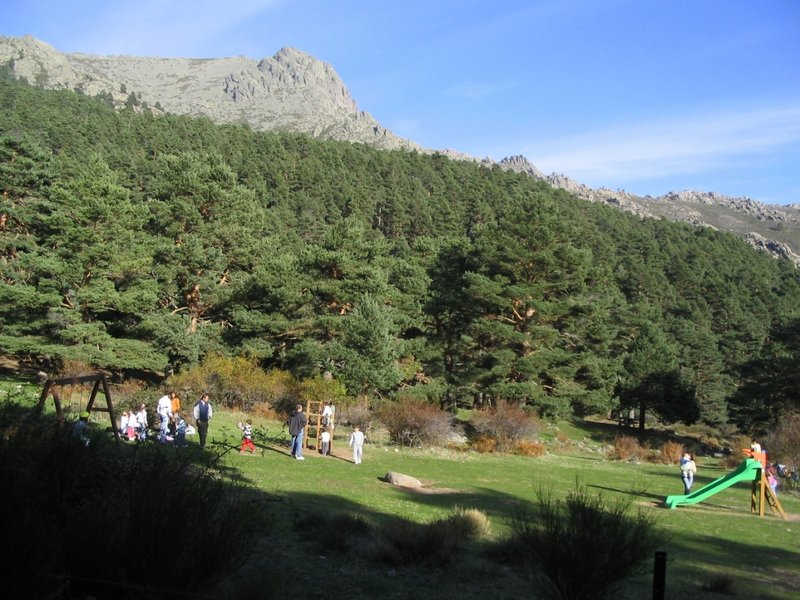
Mountain pine forest (Scots pine), in a recreational area of Valle de la Barranca, in the municipal district of Navacerrada

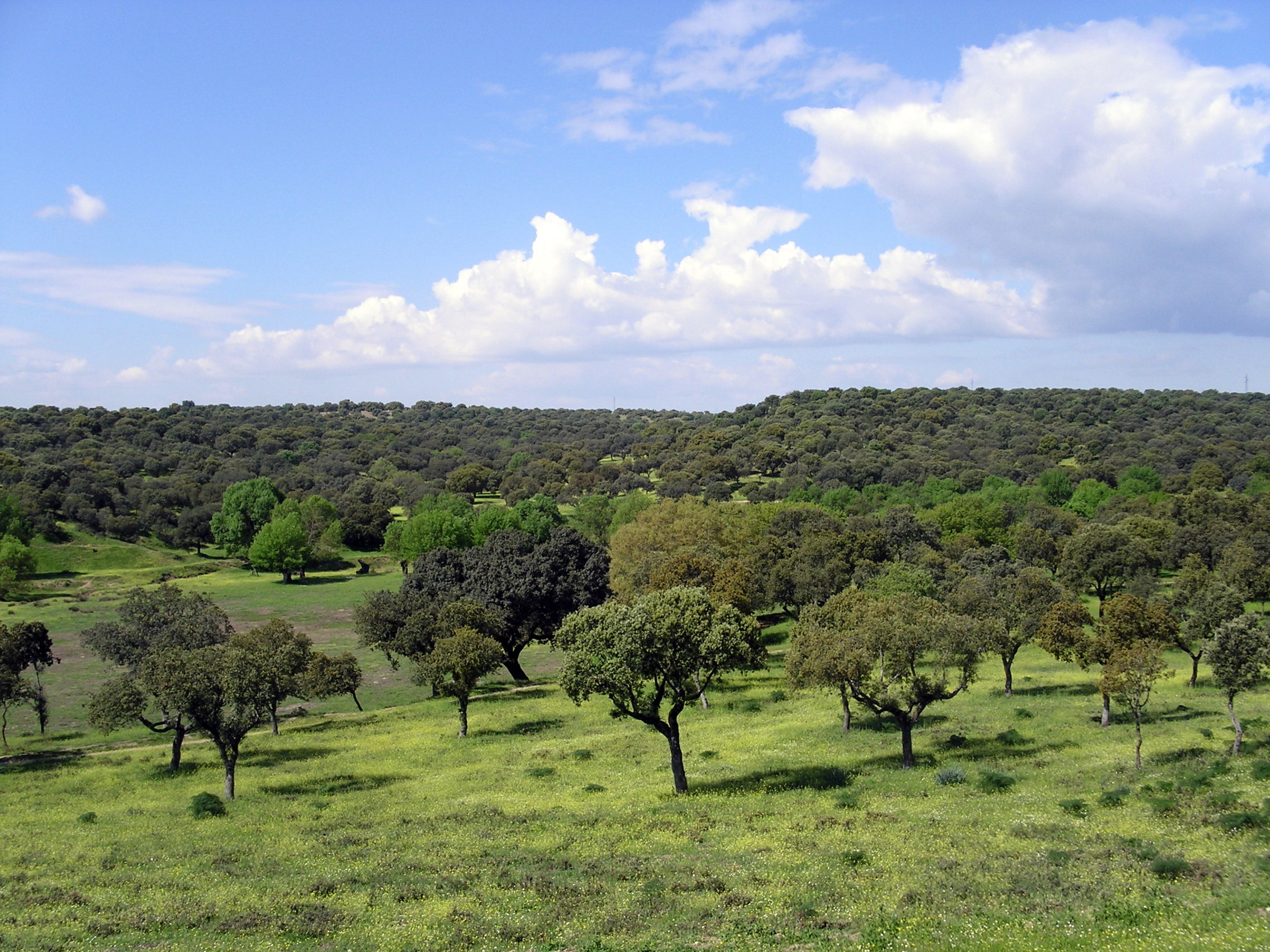
Holm oak pastureland of Soto de Viñuelas, in the municipal district of Madrid

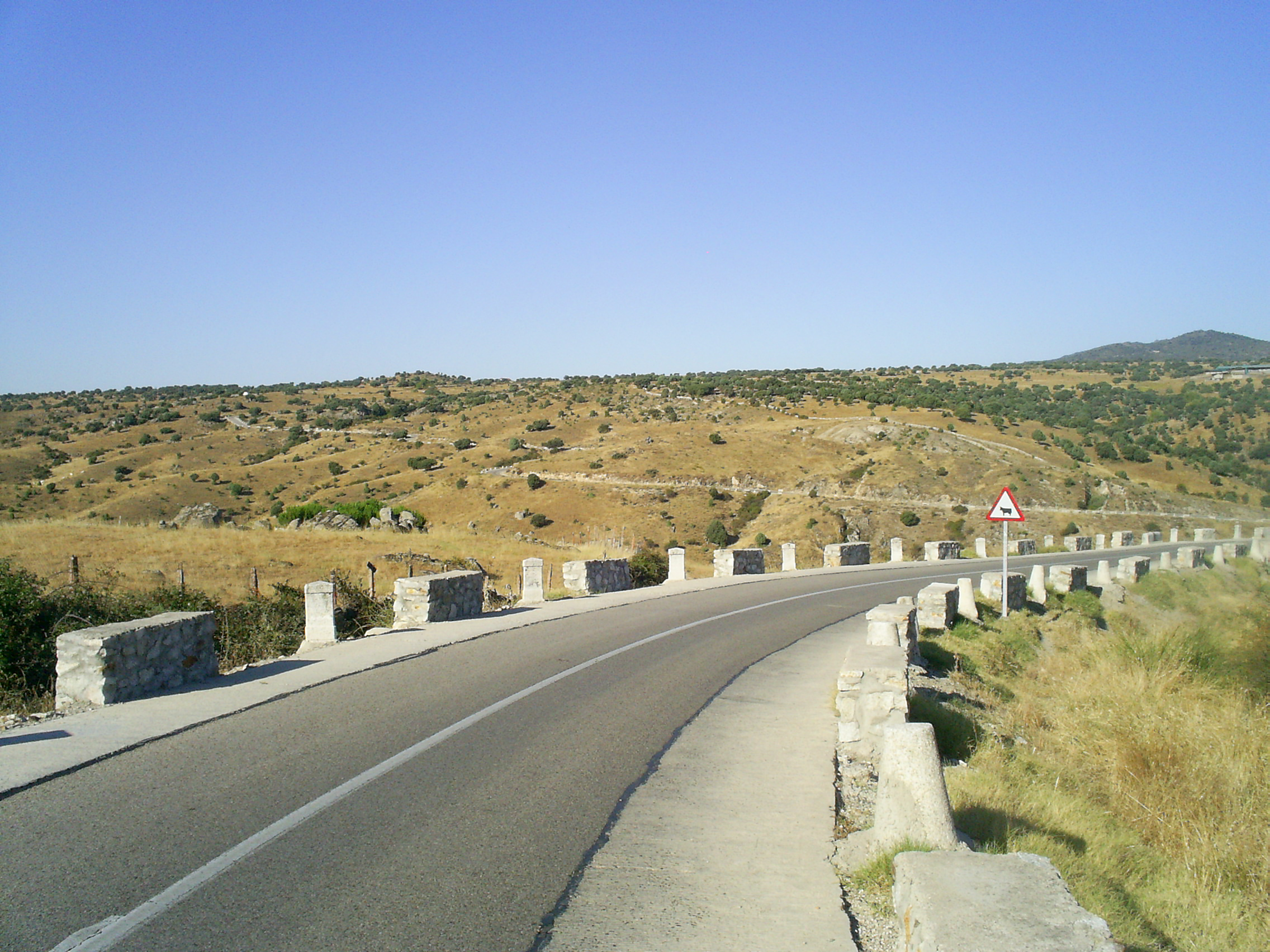
East area of the park, M-618 road towards Hoyo de Manzanares next to Colmenar Viejo

The northern limit of the Cuenca Alta del Manzanares regional park is La Pedriza. The Monte de El Pardo occupies its southern part, practically surrounding the urban area of Madrid, up to the border with the M-40 highway; and the A-6 highway, to the west, and the A-1 highway, to the east.

The site is located in eighteen municipalities, through which it runs in whole or in part. They are listed alphabetically as follows: Alcobendas, Becerril de la Sierra, Cercedilla, Collado Villalba Colmenar Viejo, El Boalo, Galapagar, Hoyo de Manzanares, Las Rozas de Madrid, Madrid, Manzanares el Real, Miraflores de la Sierra, Moralzarzal, Navacerrada, San Sebastián de los Reyes, Soto del Real, Torrelodones and Tres Cantos.

Of these, only three—Hoyo de Manzanares, Manzanares el Real and Tres Cantos (except for the Soto de Viñuelas and Nuevo Tres Cantos developments)—have fully integrated population centers. Other urban areas are also fully included within the park, such as Los Peñascales (Torrelodones) and Las Matas, a district of Las Rozas de Madrid.

The urban and demographic pressure constitutes its main threat, given its proximity to the metropolitan area of Madrid. In addition, it is crossed by several important roads. The most relevant is the M-607, which crosses it, by highway, from the Madrid district of Fuencarral to Colmenar Viejo and, by means of a single carriageway, from Colmenar Viejo to Cerceda (El Boalo).

Another road with heavy traffic is the M-608, between the latter town and Soto del Real, which crosses the park transversally passing through Manzanares el Real and bordering the northern end of the Santillana reservoir. Of less importance is the M-618 road, which goes from Torrelodones to Colmenar Viejo, through Hoyo de Manzanares, in the foothills of the Sierra del Hoyo.

In spite of all this, the park still preserves landscapes practically unaltered by man's action.

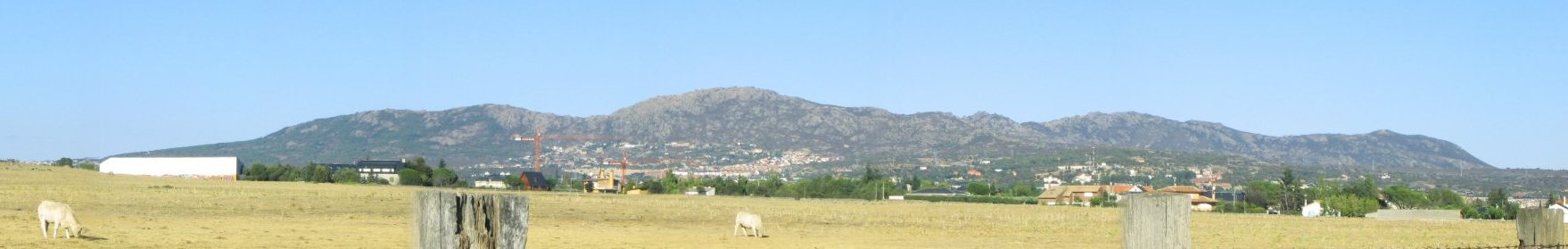
Panoramic view of the sierra del Hoyo of Manzanares, which occupies the central part of the regional park

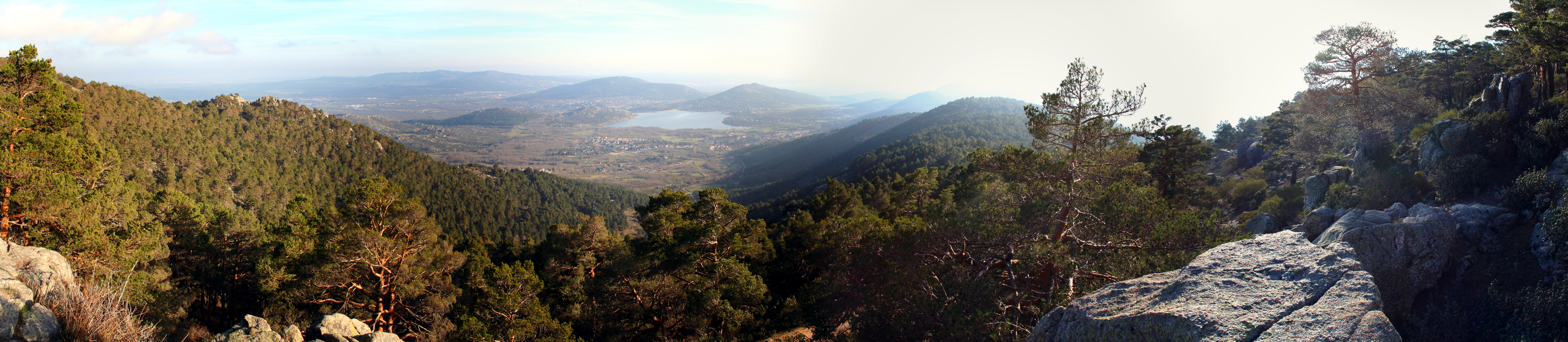
Panoramic view of the Valle de la Barranca.

== Physical geography ==
=== Geology and hydrography ===
The Cuenca Alta del Manzanares Regional Park covers three main units, from the geomorphological point of view. Its northern part, which runs through the Guadarrama elevations, some of them over 2000 m high, is mainly composed of granitic and gneiss rocks.

In this area is the headwaters of the Manzanares River, which forms a kind of basin, delimited by the peak of La Maliciosa (2227 m), the Alto de Guarramillas or Bola del Mundo (2265 m) and the Cabezas de Hierro (2383 m), a ridge known as the Cuerda Larga.

The Manzanares river behaves like a mountain river and makes its way between berrocales and rocks in a singular way. The most relevant are located in La Pedriza, the largest granite complex in Europe. This site has an approximate area of 3200 hectares, with a maximum altitude of 2029 m, in the Torres de La Pedriza, and a minimum of 890 m, at the foot of the Santillana reservoir. Here the Manzanares river receives the Samburiel river, one of its main tributaries, which has previously been retained in the Navacerrada dam.

The central part of the park is occupied by the Sierra del Hoyo de Manzanares or sierra del Hoyo—the second defined unit—which separates the valleys of the Manzanares river and Guadarrama river. It is a mountain-island, belonging to the Guadarrama mountain range, integrated by soft mountains, with an abundant presence of granite boulders. Its maximum height, of 1404 m, is located in the peak of El Estepar.

To the south of this mountain range, the terrain descends to the Monte de El Pardo, the third geomorphological unit through which the park runs, covering approximately 16 000 hectares. The granitic materials give way to detrital and sandy elements, the result of the erosion of the Guadarrama and Hoyo mountain ranges, which form an undulating landscape of gentle hills, with an average altitude of 600 m. The Monte de El Pardo sits on an immature soil, easily eroded. Similar characteristics are found in Monte de Viñuelas, eastern appendix of El Pardo.

In the southern part of the park, the Manzanares River has notably widened its valley and collects the streams of Manina and Trofas, which come from the Sierra del Hoyo. It is also retained in the El Pardo reservoir, of great ecological interest.

The Viñuelas stream, which flows through the mountain with the same name, is another important stream in the Cuenca Alta del Manzanares regional park, although it belongs to the basin of the Jarama river, to which it flows.

=== Flora ===
The large extension of the Cuenca Alta del Manzanares regional park and, above all, its marked altitudinal difference favor the presence of ecosystems representative of four of the five bioclimatic levels of the Mediterranean region of the Iberian Peninsula, from the Cryo-Mediterranean to the Meso-Mediterranean.

Due to the extent of its surface, the encina Carpetano stands out. In addition, the Portuguese oak, the narrow-leaved ash, the mountain pine forests (both sylvestris pine and cluster pine), the rocky areas, the piornales, the supra-arboreal grasslands and the pyrenean oak, as well as the gallery forests, articulated—the latter—around the Manzanares river and its tributaries, with special mention to the two main reservoirs of this river, the Santillana reservoir and the El Pardo reservoir.

There are also abundant shrubs and bushes characteristic of the Mediterranean vegetation, such as rockrose, rosemary, thyme and Spanish lavender.

In the middle of the 20th century, the territory now occupied by the Cuenca Alta del Manzanares regional park was the object of various reforestations, mainly of conifers, such as cypress, cedar and arizonica, as well as stone pine (in the valley bottoms) and sylvestris pine and laricio pine (on the slopes).

This natural space has areas of great botanical singularity. Its most representative forests are the birch of La Pedriza, the alcorn grove of Sierra del Hoyo, the enebral of Hoyo de Manzanares and the juniper grove of Becerril de la Sierra, in addition to the mountains of El Pardo and Viñuelas, considered to be the best preserved holm oak pastures in Europe.

=== Fauna ===
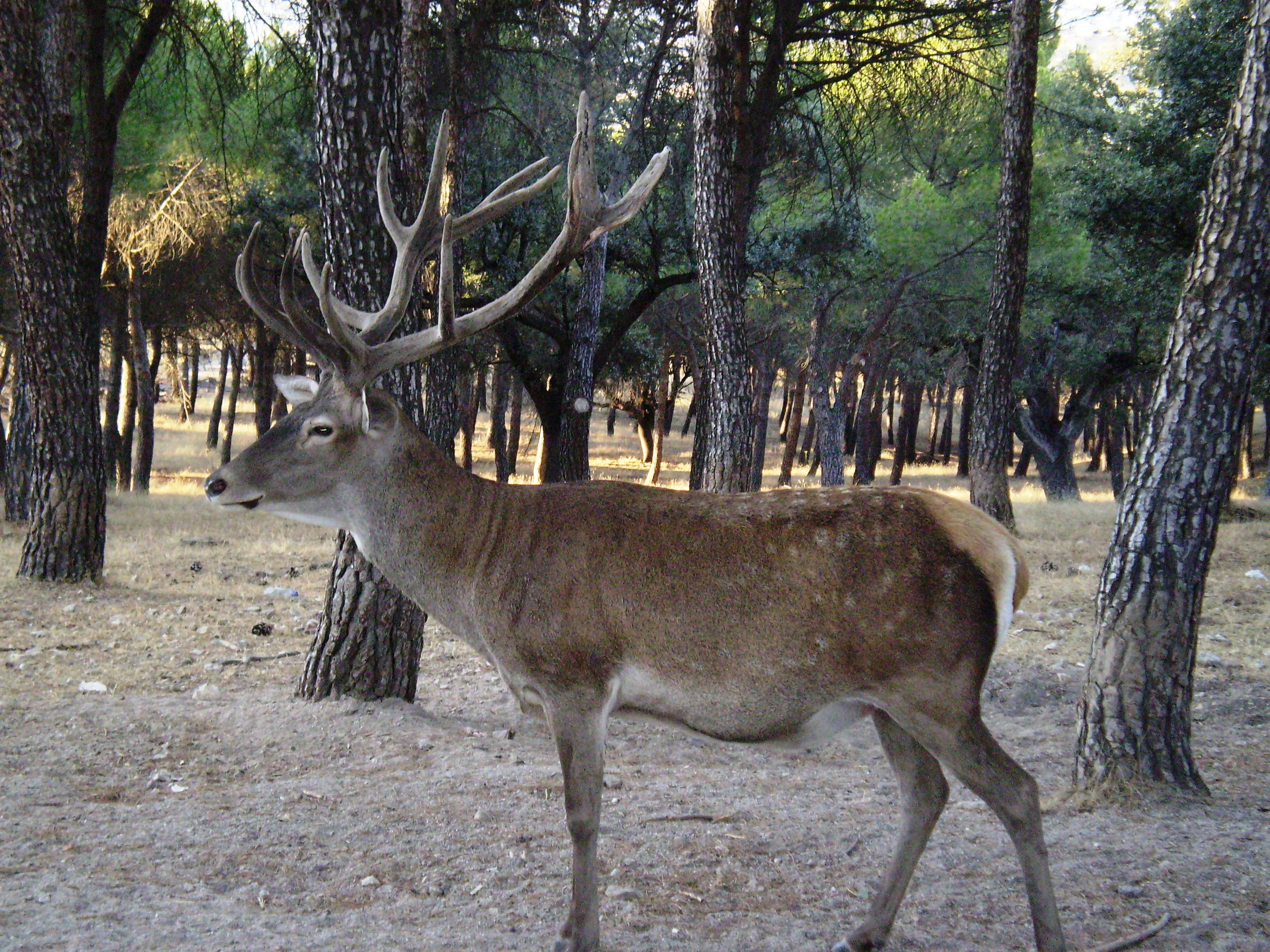
Deer in the Monte de El Pardo.

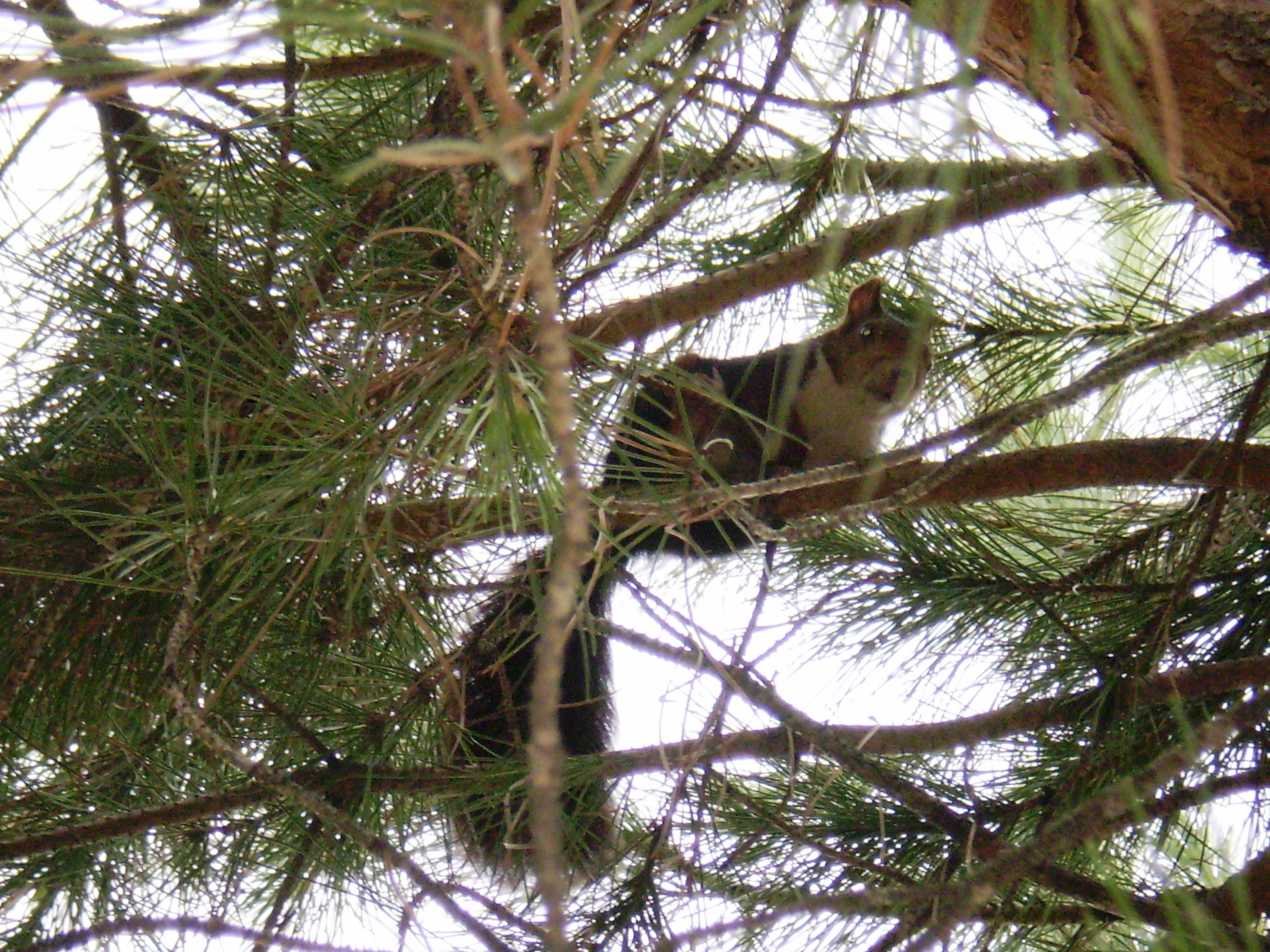
Squirrel in a pine forest in the sierra del Hoyo.

With regard to the fauna, about 300 vertebrate species have been classified, some of which are endangered, in addition to an as yet unquantified number of invertebrates.

- Mammals. Among the mammals, there are interesting populations of squirrel, weasel, rabbit, red deer, roe deer, fallow deer, wildcat, marten, geese, wild boar, hare, dormouse, badger and fox, as well as mountain goat, which appears overpopulated in La Pedriza, after having been reintroduced with notable success. The overpopulation of mammals is also a characteristic of Monte de El Pardo, in this case of cynegetic species. Periodically, animals are killed in this area in order to guarantee the ecological balance.
- Birds. In regards to avian fauna, special mention should be made of the Iberian imperial eagle, one of the most endangered birds in the world. It is estimated that Monte de El Pardo and its appendix, Monte de Viñuelas, are home to eight breeding pairs, in what is the second most important habitat in the Community of Madrid, after the SPA of the oak groves of the rivers Cofio and Alberche, in the southwest of the region. The list of raptors in the regional park is completed by the golden eagle, the booted eagle, the short-toed eagle, the osprey, the eale owl the shrike owl, the shrike, the kestrel, the buzzard, the owl, the eagle kite, the black kite, the mulet and the muzzard. The area also gathers an important fauna of aquatic birds. In the reservoirs of Santillana reservoir and El Pardo reservoir, species such as the black stork, the great cormorant, the common crane, the seagull and different anatidae. Along the course of the Manzanares River, mainly in its headwaters, coots, herons, pochards, and grebes gather. Other avian species in the park are the bee-eater, the hoopoe, the quail, the cuckoo, the woodpigeon, the kingfisher, the pheasant, the redstartling and the woodpecker, as well as birds of prey such as the black vulture and the griffon vulture.
- Reptiles and amphibians. The park gathers 56.5% of the amphibians inhabiting the Iberian Peninsula and 59.5% of the reptiles. In addition, it has a high number of endemisms, with a total of twelve species of herps. Among the most valuable sites for the preservation of the herpetofauna, the Cuerda Larga stands out, which constitutes a conservation area of the first order for the Serrano lizard, which has a very restricted distribution in the peninsular territory. In addition, the European pond turtle, seriously threatened in the Community of Madrid, has in the Santillana reservoir one of its main regional refuges.
- Fish. The Manzanares River and, mainly, the reservoirs built on its course are home to populations of barbel, carpa, pike and trout.

== Park areas ==
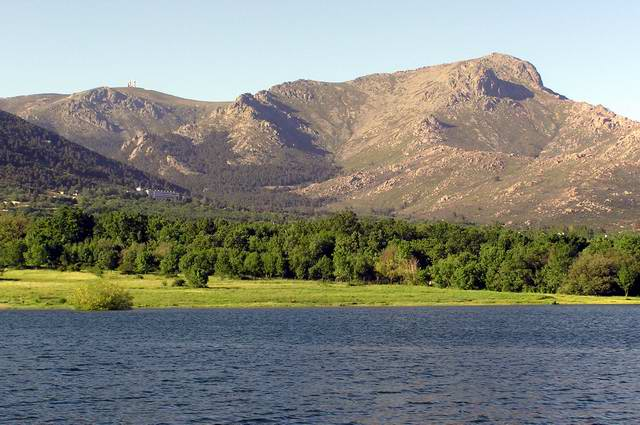
Valle de la Barranca, one of the most famous places in the regional park, is also listed as Zone A1.

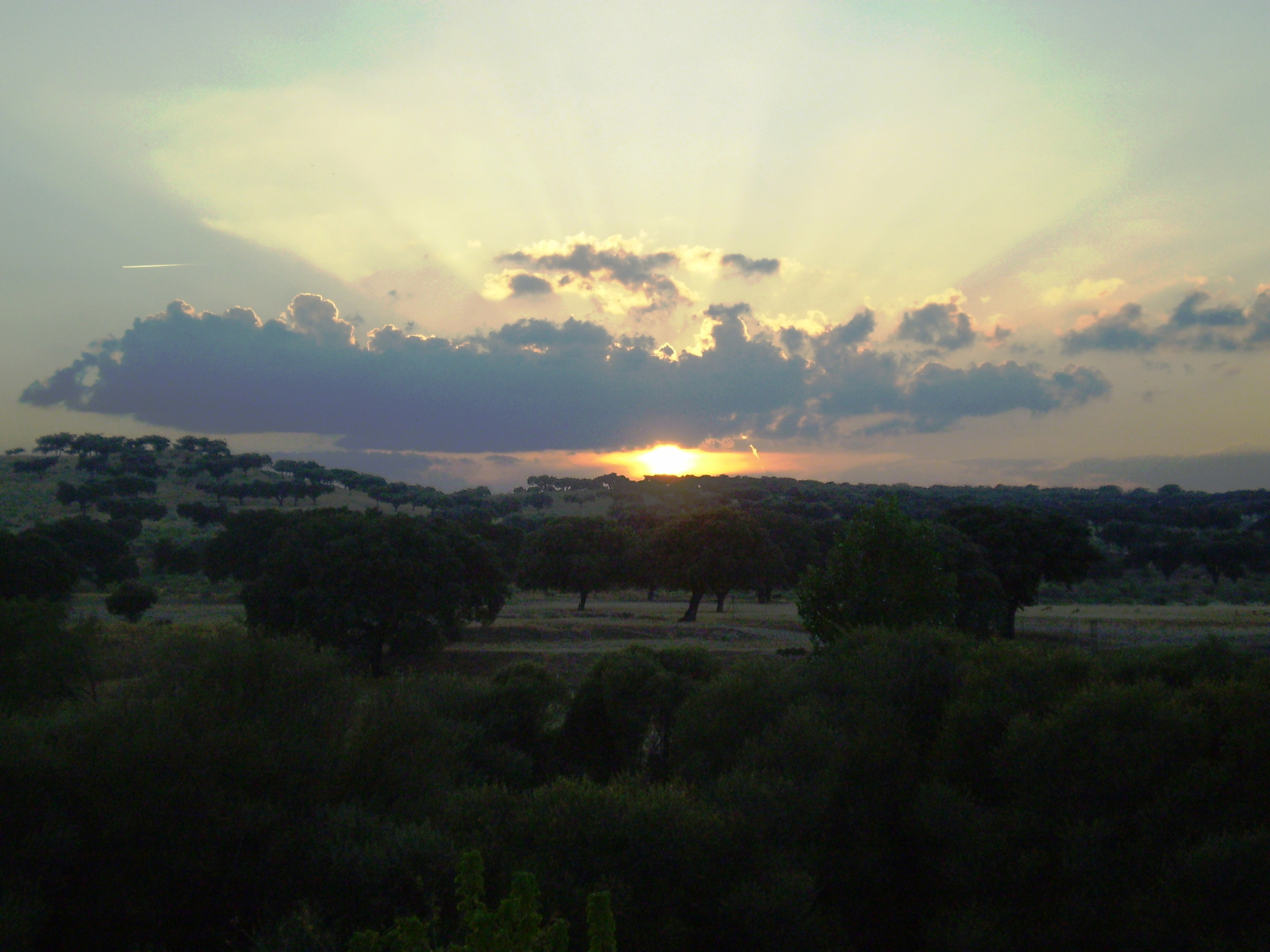
Monte de El Pardo is outside the protection zones established by the park, as it depends on Patrimonio Nacional.

Forty-four percent of the surface area of the Cuenca Alta del Manzanares regional park was classified as Zone B, a legal category that allows agricultural and livestock use of the land. Forty-five percent was considered Zone A or Natural Reserve, a category that limits the use of the different enclaves to forestry and recreational activities. This includes Zones A1, Integral Nature Reserves (the highest level of protection), and Zones A2, Educational Nature Reserves. In the areas close to urban areas there is another figure, the P Zones, where construction is permitted within certain limits. The Monte de El Pardo is excluded from this zoning, since its management corresponds to Patrimonio Nacional.

Zones A1 (Integral Nature Reserves), which are listed below in generic terms:

- Some areas in the southern part of the La Pedriza.
- The Valle de la Barranca. This valley, belonging to the municipality of Navacerrada, runs around the Samburiel river, at the foot of Bola del Mundo and La Maliciosa. Its vegetation consists mainly of pine forests of sylvestris pine.
- The areas north of the wall of El Pardo. They are articulated around the courses of some tributaries of the Manzanares river, mainly the streams of Manina and Trofas, from which numerous animal species feed. They are mainly composed of holm oaks and cistus.
- Finca del Coto de la Pesadilla and Dehesa Boyal de San Sebastián de los Reyes. It is a pasture oak grove, located in the municipality of San Sebastián de los Reyes, belonging to the basin of the Jarama river. Its inclusion within the Cuenca Alta del Manzanares regional park and its cataloguing as Zone A1 is due to its proximity to the Monte de El Pardo-Monte de Viñuelas forest axis, as an eastern extension. This property is home to a pair of imperial eagles, an endangered species.

With respect to the A2 Zones (Educational Nature Reserves), these can be grouped into three large areas:

- Various areas south of the Cuerda Larga and around the Valle de la Fuenfría
- Southern and eastern slopes of the Sierra del Hoyo de Manzanares. The A2 Zones included here fulfill an important function as a biological corridor, connecting the Sierra de Guadarrama with the Monte de El Pardo, through the Sierra del Hoyo de Manzanares, to the border with the urban area of Madrid. They integrate ecosystems of dense and grassy holm oak, scrubland and meadows, representative of the Mediterranean forest.
- Eastern area of the municipality of Las Rozas in contact with the Monte de El Pardo. This area, mainly composed of scrubland, with an abundance of broom groves, has been catalogued as Zone A2 in an attempt to preserve the areas adjacent to the Monte de El Pardo from urban development pressure. The El Águila estate, in the district of Las Matas, is one of its most outstanding sites.

In addition to the A Zones, the Cuenca Alta del Manzanares regional park has 73 wetlands, among which the Santillana reservoir stands out. This is an important enclave for the wintering of waterfowls, coots and other aquatic birds.

== Artistic heritage ==
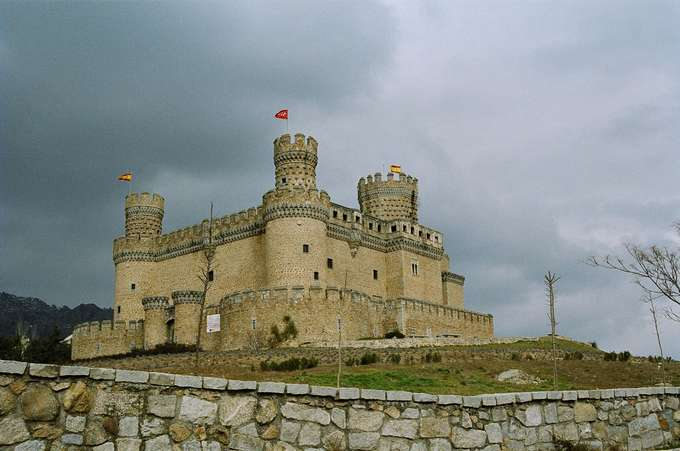
Castle of Manzanares el Real in Manzanares el Real.

Much of the territory occupied by the Cuenca Alta del Manzanares regional park was, during the Late Middle Ages and the Renaissance, in the hands of the powerful lordship of el Real de Manzanares, belonging to the House of Mendoza. The Castle of Manzanares el Real, located at the foot of the Santillana reservoir, in the municipality of Manzanares el Real, is the result of this historical link. It is one of the best preserved castles in the Community of Madrid. Its works began in 1475.

The Monte de El Pardo, for its part, houses important monuments, which were ordered to be built by different monarchs, to make their stay in this preserve, one of their favorite hunting grounds, more comfortable. The Palacio Real de El Pardo, which sits on an old hunting lodge, erected in 1405 at the behest of Henry III, stands out. The present building was begun in the time of Charles V and has undergone successive transformations over the centuries.

In Monte de Viñuelas there is the castle of the same name, whose first references date back to 1285, although the current construction corresponds to the 18th century. It has a square floor plan, topped at its four corners by two cylindrical crenellated towers.

In Torrelodones, a municipality located on the western border of the park, at the foot of the sierra del Hoyo, is the Palace of Canto del Pico, which has a certain modernist architecture feel to it. Conceived as a house-museum, the building integrates in its structure architectural elements from different Spanish monuments. It was built in 1920 and personalities such as Antonio Maura, Indalecio Prieto, General Miaja and Francisco Franco have paraded through it. It was declared a Conjunto histórico in 1930.

== See also ==
- Regional parks of Spain
- Soto de Viñuelas
- Monte de El Pardo
