= Soto del Real =

- Municipality
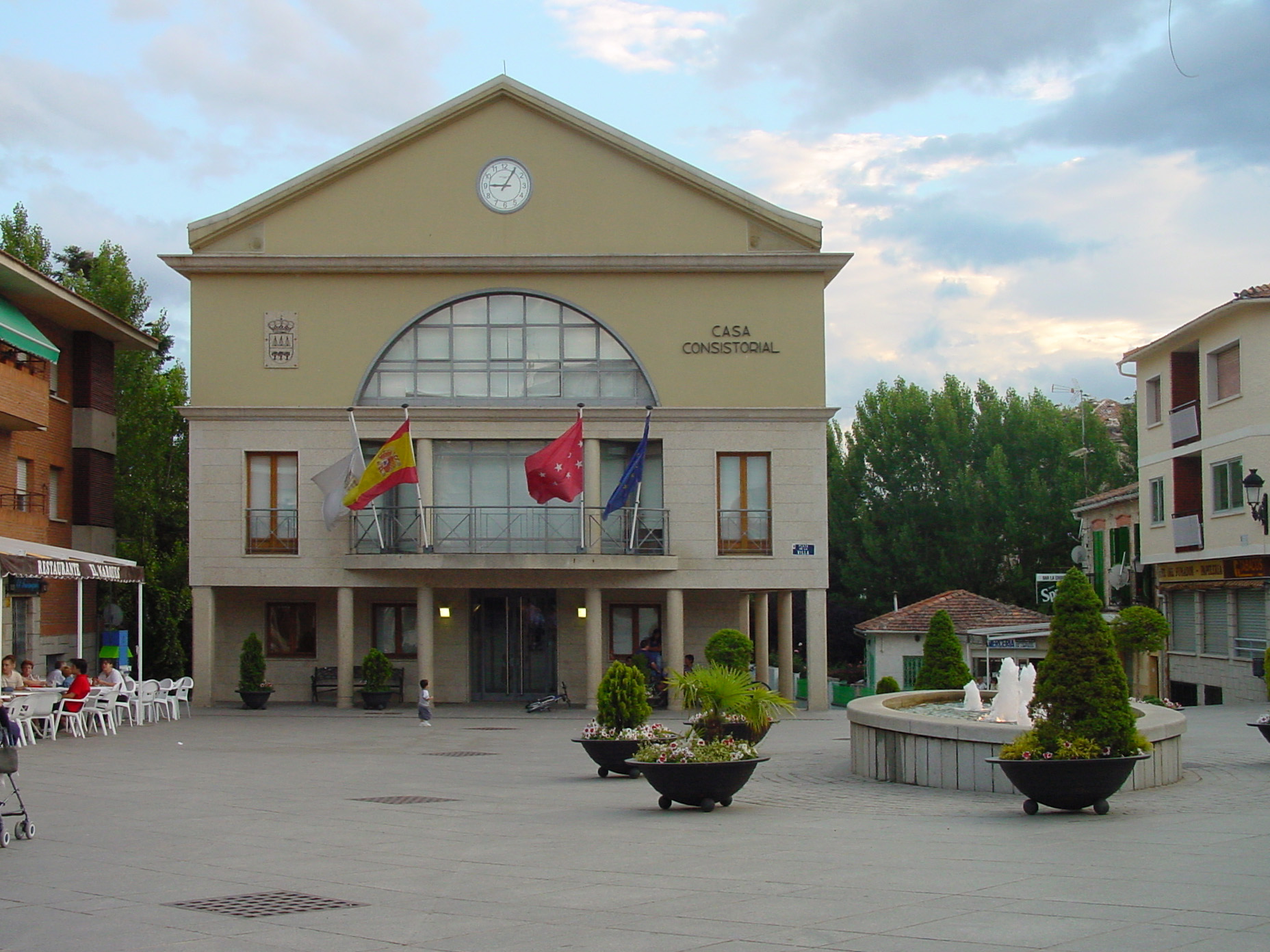
- Town hall

- Coat of arms

- Location in Spain
- Coordinates: 40°45′15″N 3°47′0″W
- Country: Spain
- Autonomous community: Madrid
- Province: Madrid
- Comarca: Cuenca Alta del Manzanares
- Judicial district: Colmenar Viejo
- Founded: See text

Government
  - Mayor: Noelia Barrado (PSOE)

Area
  - Total: 42.17 km^{2} (16.28 sq mi)
- Elevation: 921 m (3,022 ft)
- Highest elevation: 2,119 m (6,952 ft)
- Lowest elevation: 890 m (2,920 ft)

Population (2025-01-01)
  - Total: 9,400
  - Density: 220/km^{2} (580/sq mi)
- Demonym(s): Sotorrealeño, ña
- Time zone: UTC+1 (CET)
  - Summer (DST): UTC+2 (CEST)
- Postal code: 28791
- Dialing code: 847
- Official language(s): Spanish
- Website: Official website

Soto del Real, whose former name was Chozas de la Sierra, is a town and municipality in the northern area of the autonomous Community of Madrid which had 9,188 inhabitants in 2022.

43 kilometers away from Madrid, the capital city, it is located between the towns of Manzanares el Real and Miraflores de la Sierra, and close to the Santillana reservoir.

== Geography ==
It is located in the north of the Community of Madrid, in Spain, in the centre of the Iberian Peninsula. The municipality has an elongated shape that goes from Northwest to Southeast, and the majority of it is protected inside the Parque Regional de la Cuenca Alta del Manzanares.

It borders with Manzanares el Real on the West, Miraflores de la Sierra on the East, Colmenar Viejo on the South, and Rascafría on the North.

Soto del Real encompasses a variety of terrains: mountain tops, slopes, and the Manzanares-Guadalix tectonic pit. The urban nucleus is inside the pit, going through the Mediano, Chozas and Matarrubias streams, which flow into the Santillana reservoir, so they are tributaries of the Manzanares river.

Geologically speaking, it is divided into the Mountain range, where there is a predominance of Gneiss with granite outcrops, and the pit formed by a tertiary sedimentary fill. Furthermore, in the South area there is limestone from the Mesozoic era.

== History ==
The first evidence of settlements in Soto del Real dates from the 10th century, with archeological remains of houses and ceramics attributed to shepherds.

During the 13th century, the area encompassing Colmenar Viejo, Chozas de la Sierra and Porquerizas (Miraflores de la Sierra) was a source of legal conflict between the provinces of Madrid and Segovia, with John I of Castile incorporating Chozas to the municipality of El Real de Manzanres in 1389.

In 1568 Philip II of Spain exempted Chozas from El Real de Manzanares.

The name Soto del Real has been in use since a 1959 vote in which the local population chose the name over Alameda de la Sierra or its historic one, Chozas de la Sierra. The town's coat of arms makes reference to both of the town's names.

Soto makes reference to the numerous trees and forests surrounding (in Spanish Sotos), del Real referring to its historical ties to El Real de Manzanares from 1389 till 1568.

== Festivities ==
The first weekend of August Soto del Real celebrates its festivities in honour of the Virgen del Rosario (Our Lady of the Rosary), patron of the municipality.

The 7 October, day of the Virgin of the Rosary, is also celebrated, as is 15 May, day of San Isidro

== Bus lines ==
- SE720: Colmenar Viejo - Manzanares el Real
- 720: Colmenar Viejo - Collado Villalba
- 721: Madrid (Plaza de Castilla) - Colmenar Viejo (only Friday, Saturday, Sunday and holidays the buses of this line continue to Madrid V Penitentiary Center, in the outskirts of Soto del Real)
- 724: Madrid (Plaza de Castilla) - Manzanares el Real - El Boalo
- 725: Madrid (Plaza de Castilla) - Miraflores de la Sierra - Bustarviejo - Valdemanco
- 726: Madrid (Plaza de Castilla) - Guadalix - Navalafuente
