= Canal de Isabel II =

Spanish water company

- Headquarters: calle de Santa Engracia
- Net income: ▲€154.7 million (2023)
- Owner: Madrid regional administration (82%); Ayuntamiento de Madrid (10%); Other 113 ayuntamientos (8%)

Canal de Isabel II (CYII) is the company that manages the bulk of water supplies for the Community of Madrid. It is primarily owned by the regional administration through the so-called Ente Público Canal de Isabel II, with a minor stake owned by local governments.

== History ==
The Y in the abbreviated form of the company's name is from the old spelling Ysabel for Queen Isabel II, during whose reign a modern water supply was provided for Madrid. A canal was constructed to provide water from the catchment of the river Lozoya.

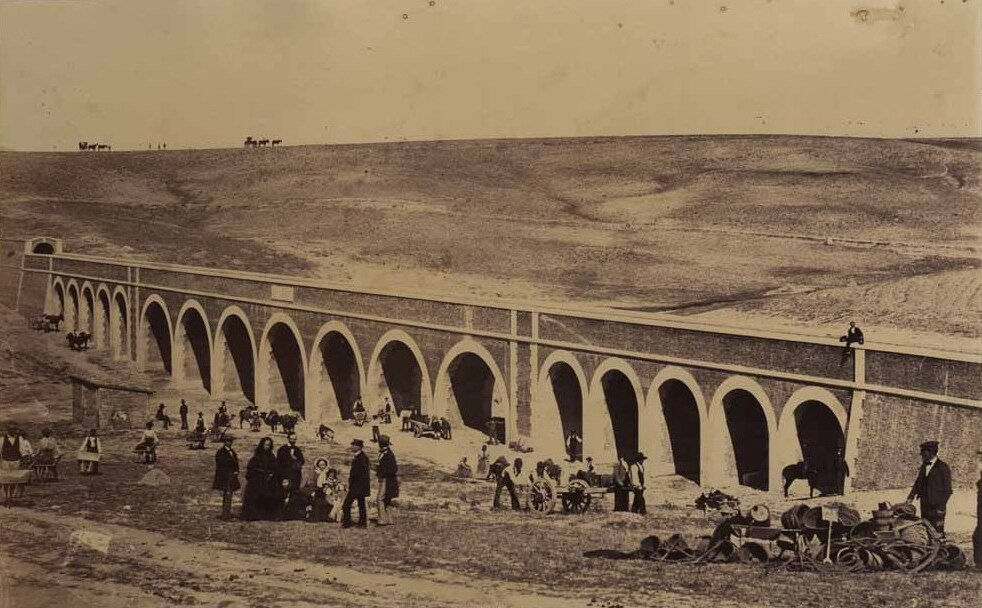
The construction of the canal as photographed in about 1856 by Charles Clifford

The water entered the city through its northern suburbs using gravity.

== The Canal in the Community of Madrid ==
The Community of Madrid has a population of about 6.5 million people. To manage the necessary water resources, the Community operates, via Canal de Isabel II Gestión S.A., 14 dams; 75 underground water intakes; 13 drinking water treatment plants; 29 major and 285 minor regulating reservoirs; 17,163 kilometers of adduction and distribution network; 159 drinking water pumping stations and 125 sewage pumping stations; 11,148 kilometers of sewage network; 63 storm tanks; 751 kilometers of main sewers and outfalls; 156 wastewater treatment plants; and 347 kilometers network of reclaimed water.

== The Canal in Latin America ==
In the 21st century the Canal expanded its operations to Latin America, where its acquisitions included a Brazilian water company called Emissão.

== See also ==
- Santillana reservoir
