= Santillana reservoir =

- Manzanares del Real reservoir Embalse de Manzanares el Real
- Embalse de Santillana (Spanish)
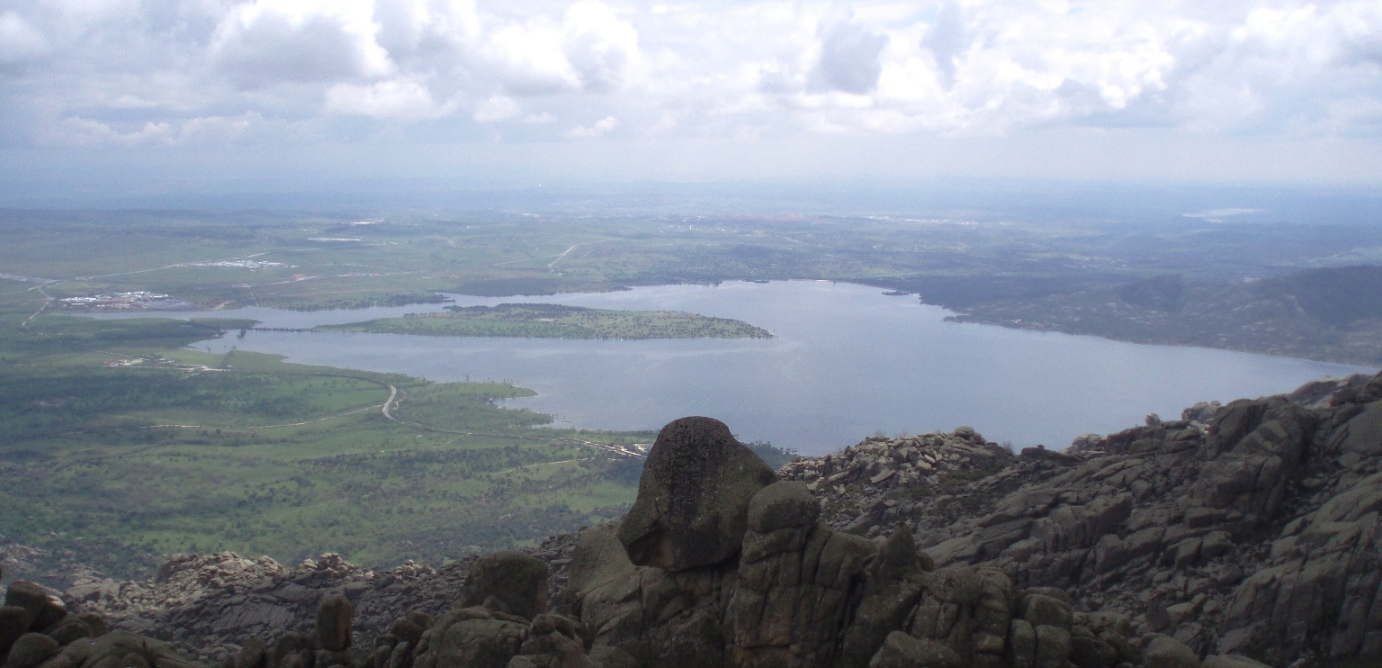
- General view of the reservoir from nearby mountains La Pedriza

- Location within Spain
- Location: Community of Madrid, Spain
- Coordinates: 40°3′17.9″N 3°49′49.3″W
- Type: reservoir
- Part of: Tagus basin
- Primary inflows: river
- River sources: Manzanares river
- Basin countries: Spain
- Managing agency: Canal de Isabel II; Confederación Hidrográfica del Tajo
- Designation: Protected area (part of Parque regional de la Cuenca Alta del Manzanares)
- Built: 1907; 1969 (renewal)
- Construction engineer: B Diaz y Diaz
- First flooded: 1971
- Max. width: 30 km (19 mi)
- Surface area: 1,052 ha (2,600 acres)
- Water volume: 91 hm^{3} (74,000 acre⋅ft)
- Shore length^{1}: {anuel}
- Surface elevation: 863 m (2,831 ft)
- Settlements: Manzanares el Real; Soto del Real; Colmenar Viejo
- ^{1} Shore length is not a well-defined measure.

Santillana reservoir, also known as Manzanares el Real reservoir (Spanish: embalse de Santillana or embalse de Manzanares el Real), is a body of water along the Manzanares river located in the municipalities of Manzanares el Real and Soto del Real, in the Community of Madrid, in the centre of Spain. It has a maximum surface of 1052 ha, the longest distance between opposites shores reaches 30 kilometres (19 mi), and the total volume of the reservoir is 91 hm³. The first dam was built in 1907, but in 1969 a new and higher dam was built. This new construction was 5 m higher, which allowed the reservoir to have a volume twice as large as before.

The second and present dam, built in a period of 12 months, began its service in 1971. Its foundations are located at an altitude of 856.5 metres (2,810 ft) and the highest point of the dam is at 896.5 m (2,941 ft), with a total length of 1,355 m (4,446 ft).

Belonging to the Canal de Isabel II public company, it regulates the flow of the Manzanares river and an important part of the water supply to the city of Madrid and its surroundings. Smaller rivers Samburiel and Arroyo del Mediano also flow into the reservoir, which is part of the natural protected area called Parque Regional de la Cuenca Alta del Manzanares. It is also part of the Site of Community Importance (SCI) Manzanares basin, with code ES3110004.

== Gallery ==
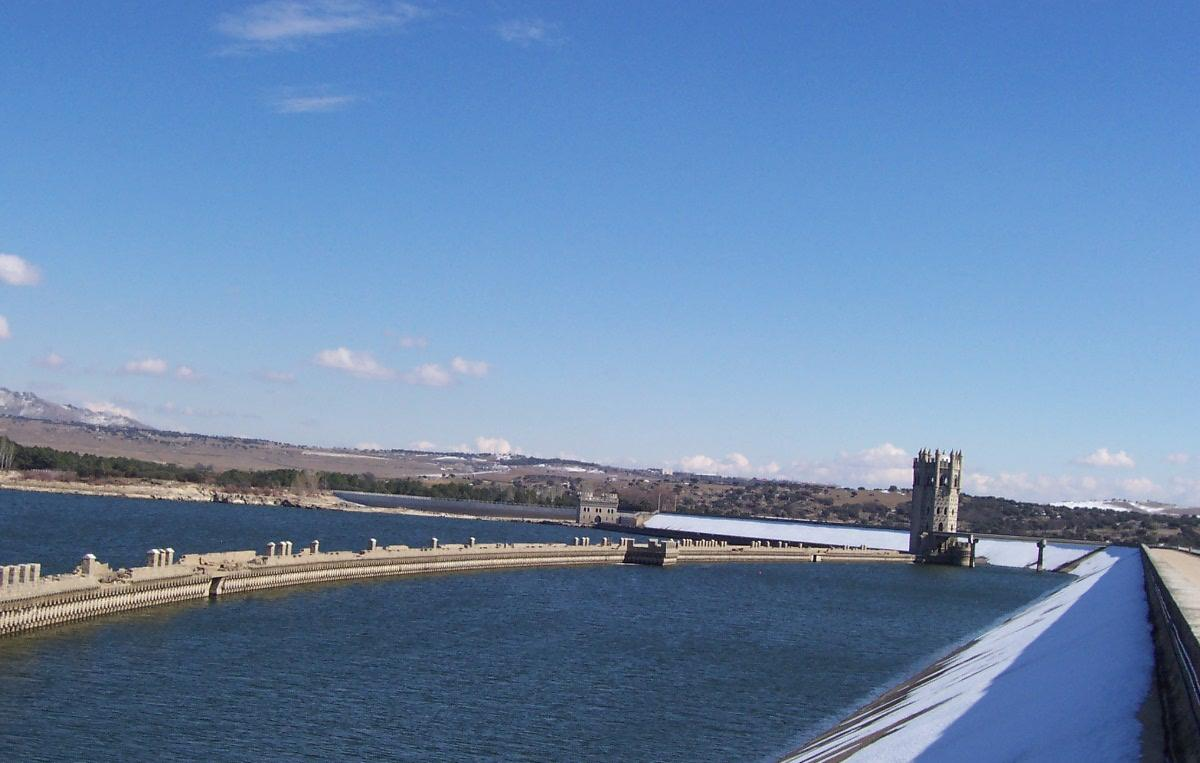
New dam and old dam partially flooded.

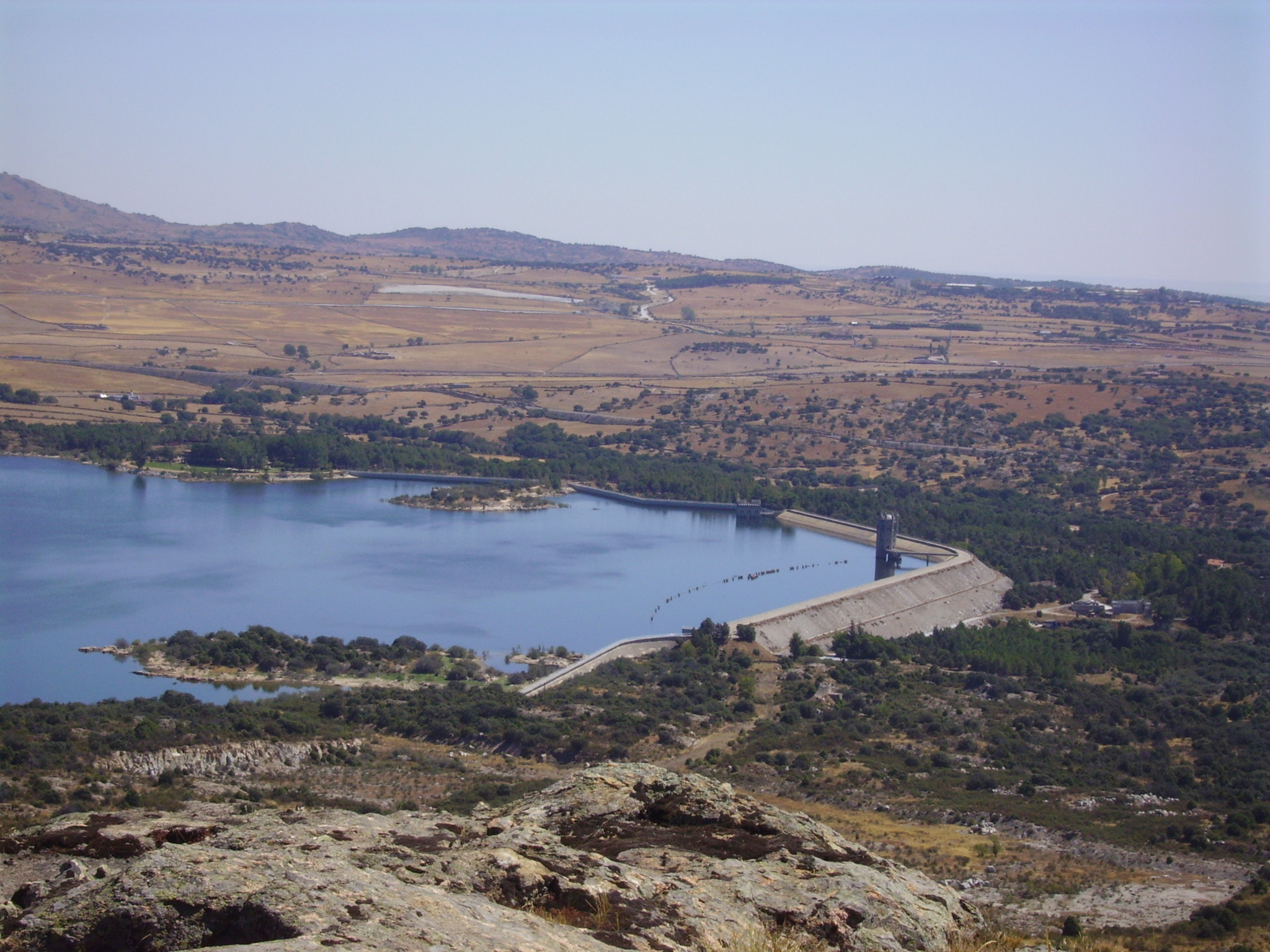
View of the dam of the Santillana reservoir.

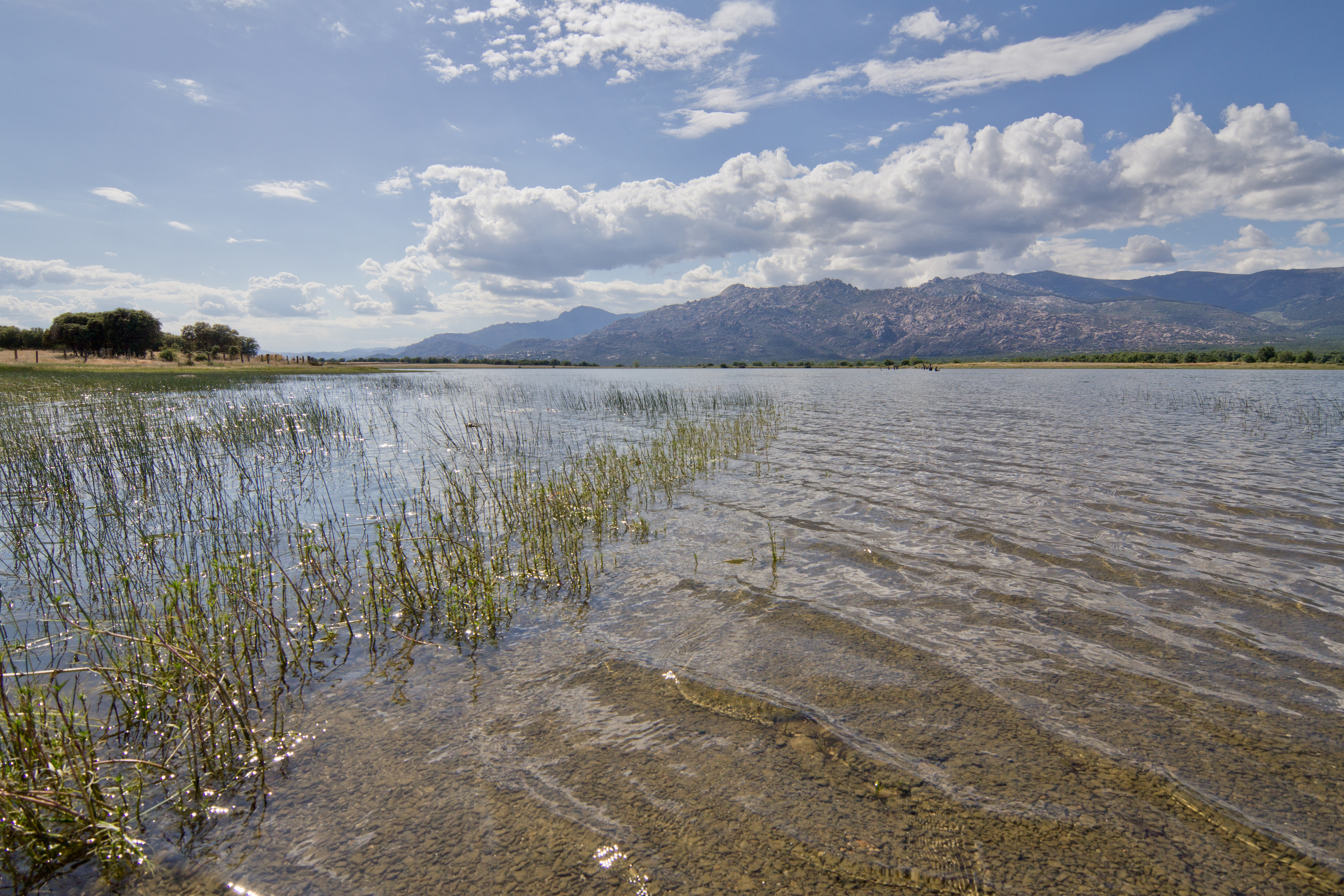
Santillana reservoir, with La Pedriza mountains in the background.
