= Soto de Viñuelas =

Coordinates: 40.6102°N 3.6878°W

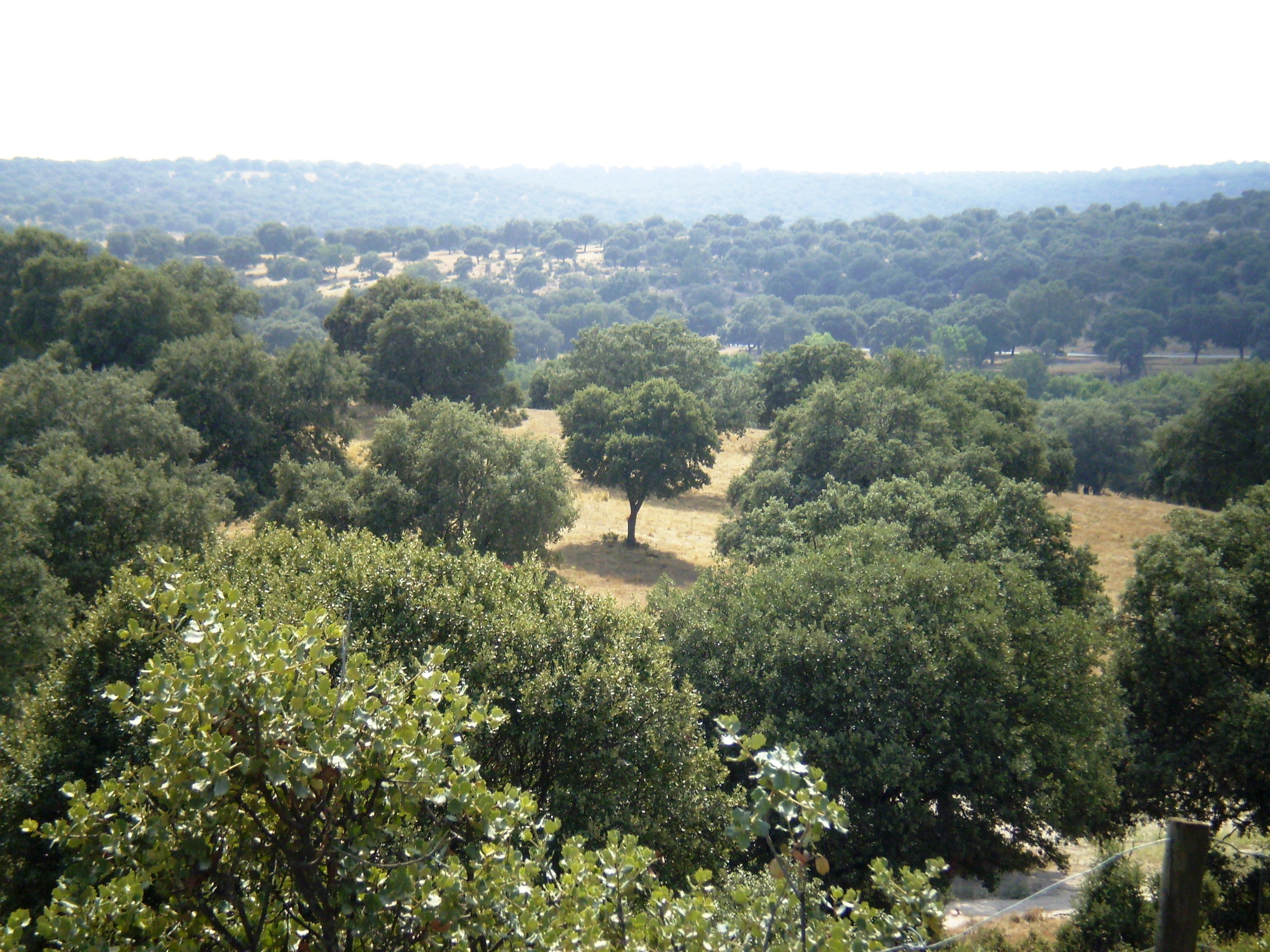
Soto de Viñuelas, Madrid, Spain.

Soto de Viñuelas is a meadow-oak forest north of the city of Madrid, south of Tres Cantos and San Agustín del Guadalix, east of the Monte de El Pardo and west of San Sebastián de los Reyes, all municipalities are parts of the Community of Madrid, Spain. Much of it is a fenced property of 3,000 hectares, which includes important ecological values, landscape and art. It belongs to the municipality of Madrid, although it contains small areas to the north, corresponding to Tres Cantos, including a development of the same name (i.e., Soto de Viñuelas). Other developments nearby are Ciudalcampo and Fuente del Fresno, situated on its western boundary. King's College, the British School of Madrid, is also located in the development of Soto de Viñuelas, abutting the Regional Park. In 1985, Soto de Viñuelas was transformed into the Regional Park of the Cuenca Alta del Manzanares, the largest protected natural area in the region. It has been classified as Area B, a legal designation that allows agricultural land use. Soto de Viñuelas also received the status of Special Protection Area for Birds. It is accessible from the M-607 Freeway (Colmenar Viejo Freeway), exit 20. Both Soto de Viñuelas and Tres Cantos are listed on the exit sign.

== History ==
The estate belonged to the lordship of Real de Manzanares, owned by the Casa de Mendoza. In the 16th century it passed into the hands of Emperor Charles I. In 1693 Soto de Viñuelas was acquired by Cristobal Alvarado Bracamonte, who rebuilt the manor house, now known as Castle Viñuelas, to facilitate the stay of Philip V. In 1751, the Spanish Crown took over the land, at the request of Ferdinand VI, who added it to the Royal Site of El Pardo. In the 19th century, after the fall of Isabella II of Spain, the site was auctioned off. In the 20th century, during the Spanish Civil War, the castle served as headquarters of the Republican Army. After the war, the mansion was chosen by Francisco Franco as his official residence, He named it the "Royal Palace of El Pardo". The farm has gone through various private hands, Banco Santander and the family of Urquijo Colomer.

== Transport system ==
The only way to arrive Soto de Viñuelas in public transport is with bus line 716, which connects it with Tres Cantos and Madrid. The other way is with local bus line L-3.
