= Manzanares (river) =

River in Spain

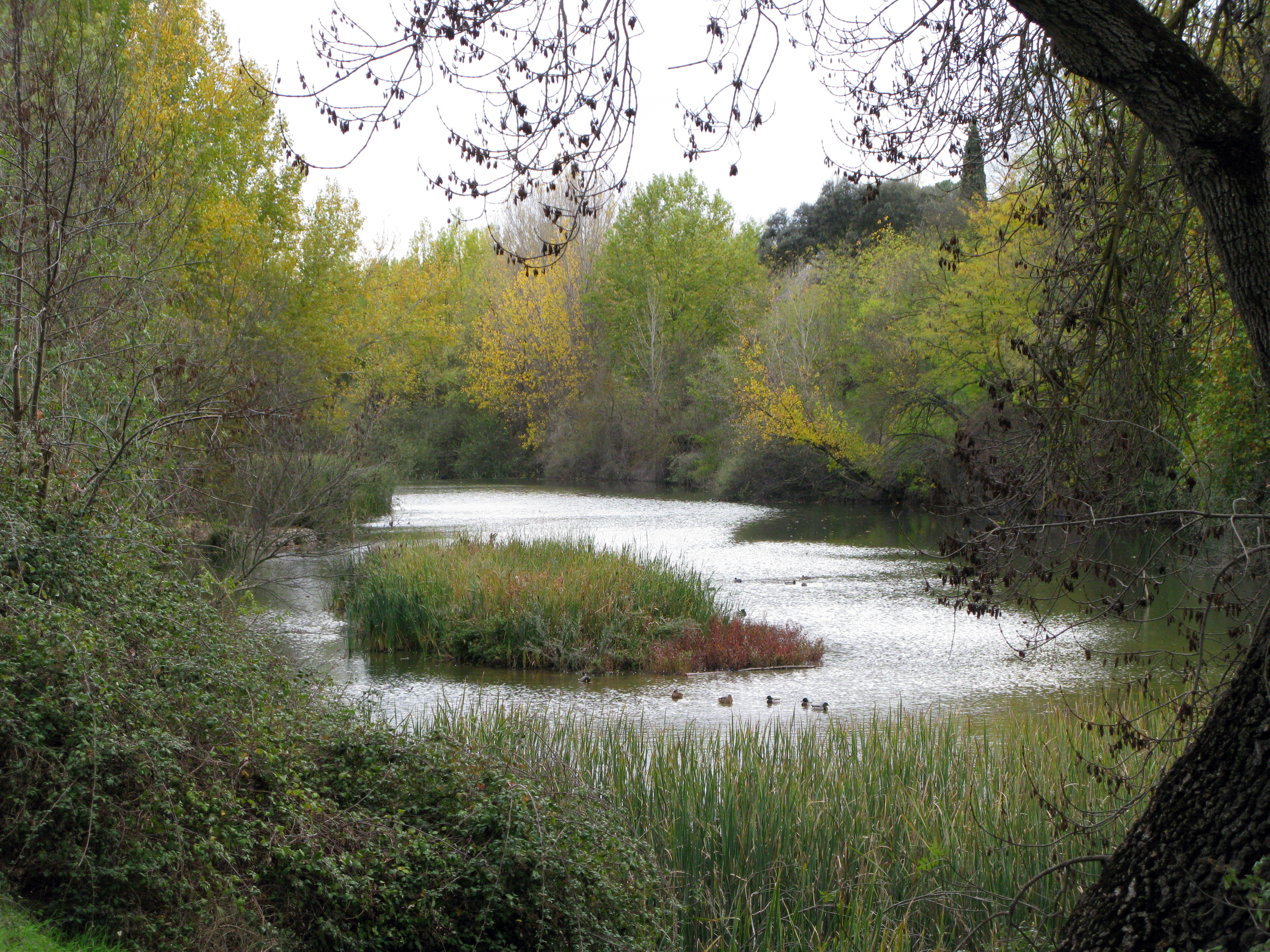
- The Manzanares through El Pardo

Location
- Country: Spain
- Region: Iberian Peninsula

Physical characteristics
- Source: Confluence of Arroyo de la Condesa and Arroyo de Valdemartín
  - location: Manzanares el Real
  - coordinates: 40°46′28″N 3°57′20″W
  - elevation: c. 1,810 m (5,940 ft)
- Mouth: Jarama river
  - location: Rivas Vaciamadrid
  - coordinates: 40°18′13″N 3°32′23″W
  - elevation: 533 m (1,749 ft)
- Length: 92 km (57 mi)
- Discharge
  - average: 10–15 m^{3}/s (350–530 cu ft/s)

Basin features
- Progression: Jarama→ Tagus→ Atlantic Ocean

The Manzanares (Spanish pronunciation: [manθaˈnaɾes]) is a river in the centre of the Iberian Peninsula. It flows from the Sierra de Guadarrama, passes through Madrid, and eventually empties into the Jarama river, which in turn is a right-bank tributary to the Tagus. In its urban section, the Manzanares River was modified to create a section of water several meters deep, in some parts navigable by canoes. This project of channeling and damming has been partially reversed in a re-naturalization project.

== Hydronym ==
The name of Manzanares was in use already in the 16th century, although up until the 17th century alternative names such as Guadarrama, Henarejos, and Jarama were used. It was widely popularised by the height of the 18th century. The origin of the name for the river and the village of the same name through which it flows (founded not earlier than the 13th century) is moot.

== Course ==
=== Sources ===
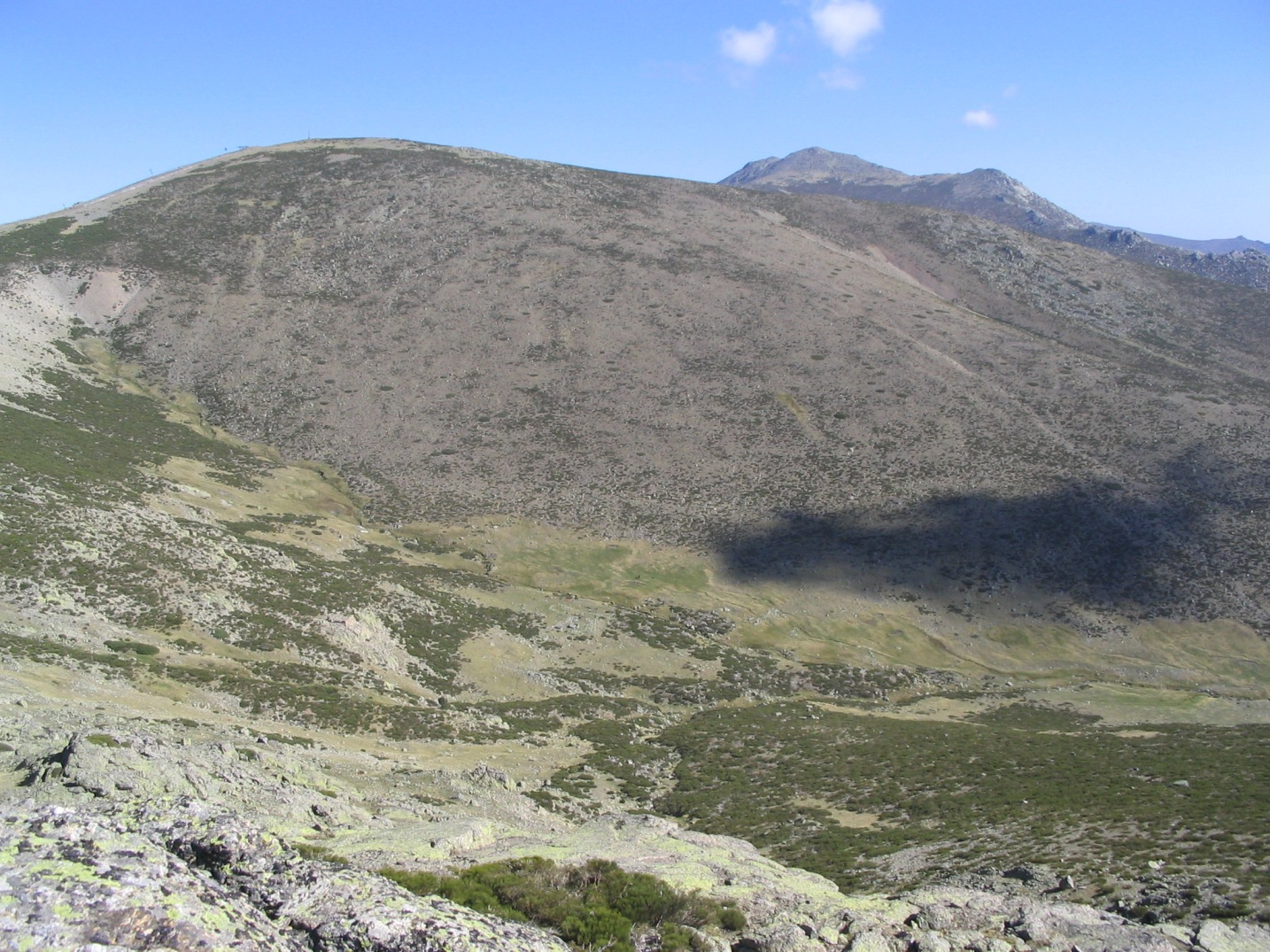
View of the watershed of the Ventisquero de la Condesa

The Manzanares has its sources in the southern slope of the Cuerda Larga, a branch of the Sierra de Guadarrama (the main eastern section of the Sistema Central), in the municipality of Manzanares el Real, in the Madrid region.

It is formally called Manzanares after the confluence of the Arroyo de la Condesa and the Arroyo de Valdemartín.

The Arroyo de la Condesa is in turn born in the ventisquero de la Condesa, a traditionally resilient snowdrift, and its watershed comprises the slopes in between La Maliciosa (2,227 m), the Alto de las Guarramillas—aka the Bola del Mundo (2,258 m)—and the Alto de Valdemartín (2,282 m).

The Arroyo de Valdemartín's watershed spans from the Alto de Valdemartín to the Cabeza de Hierro Menor (2,373 m).

=== Upper course ===
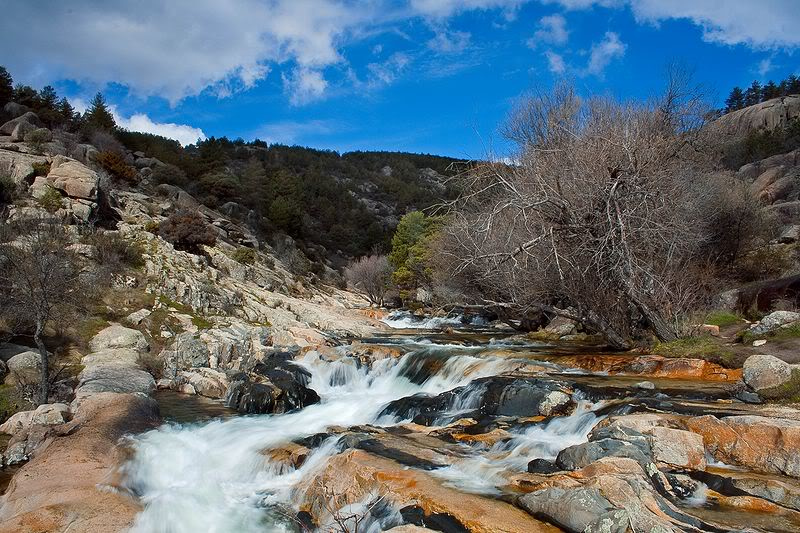
Upper course of the river

The upper river basin is protected as the Parque Regional de la Cuenca Alta del Manzanares, a nature reserve which is recognised as a biosphere reserve by UNESCO.

The Manzanares flows in a south-eastern direction from its sources and passes through the medieval town of Manzanares el Real where it is dammed to form the Santillana reservoir, one of the most important water supplies for the capital.

The river then takes a southern direction and enters the Monte de El Pardo, an ecologically valuable area on the edge of Madrid.

=== Urban course ===
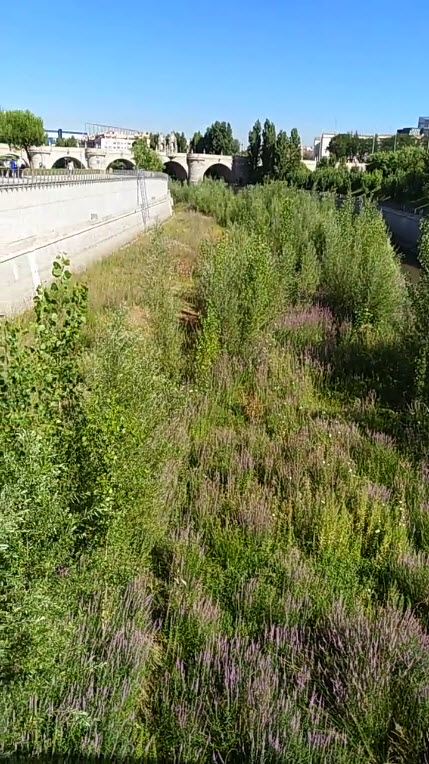
A re-naturalised section of the Manzanares crossing Madrid

The river was canalised where it passes through the built-up areas of the city. In the 21st century the river was restored to provide biodiversity and facilities for Madrid residents.

The Manzanares skims past the westernmost part of the city and further downstream serves as a dividing line between the old centre of the city and the Carabanchel and Usera neighbourhoods to the southwest. It is along this stretch that it passes next to Atlético Madrid's former football ground, the Vicente Calderón. The river leaves the city at its southernmost tip.

=== Lower course ===
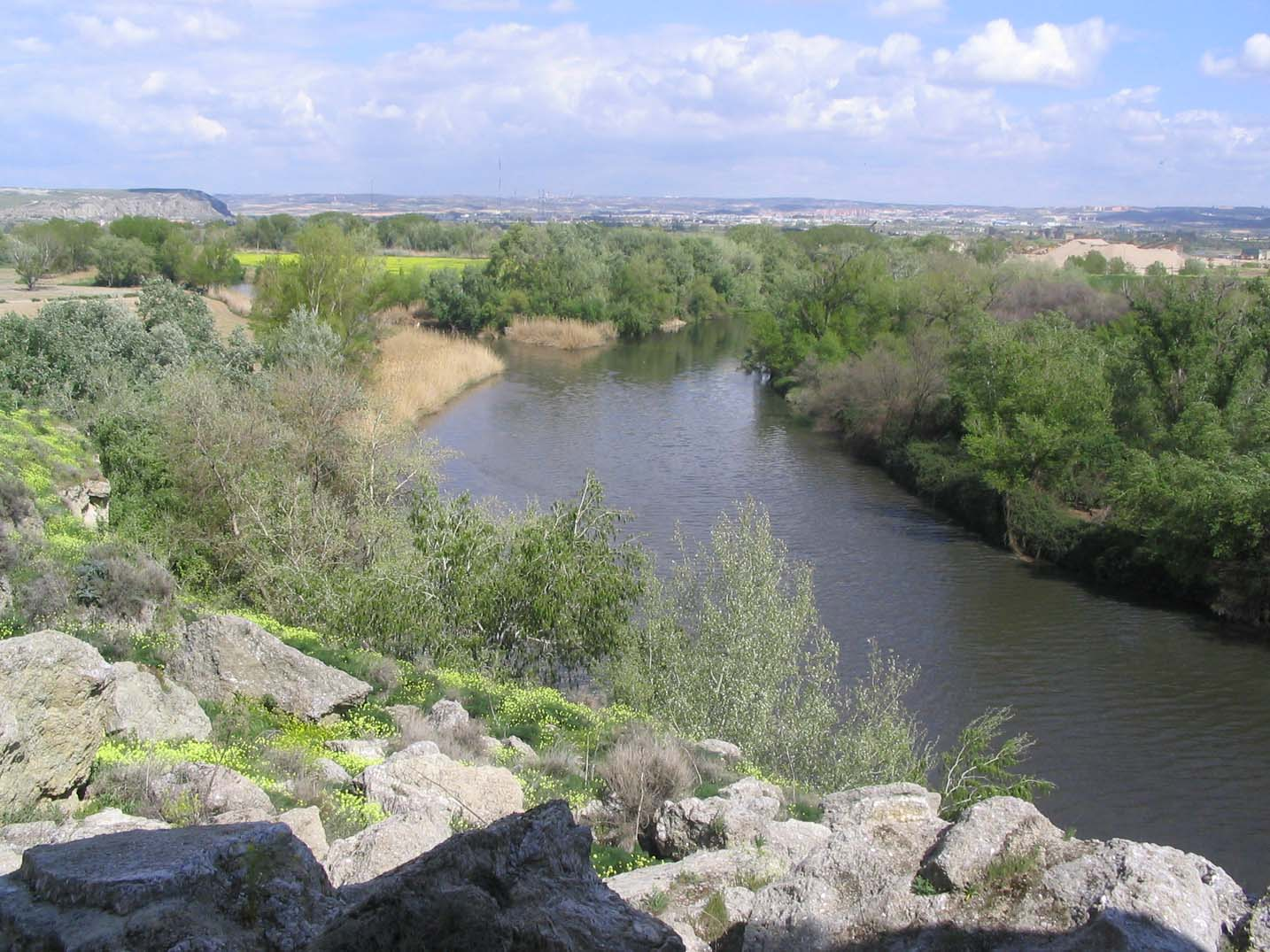
The Manzanares (left) empties into the Jarama (right)

It makes a strong eastern turn which takes it past the village of Perales del Río. It empties into the Jarama within the municipal limits of Rivas Vaciamadrid.

== Historical importance ==
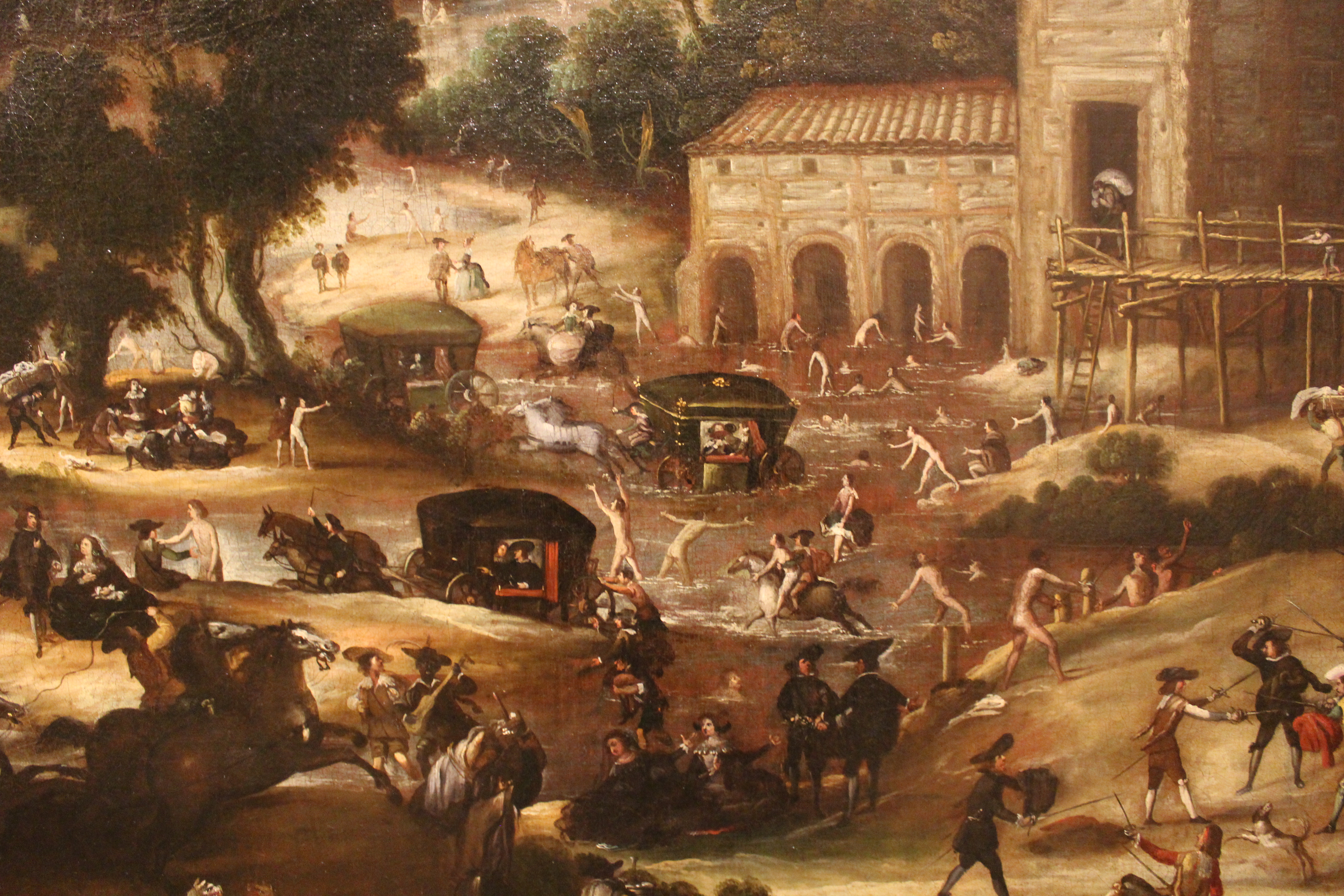
Detail of Baths in the Manzanares in the place of Molino Quemado (early 17th century)

The river Manzanares, although small and relatively unimportant geographically, has had a great historical importance due to its close relation to the city of Madrid, which was founded by the Moors as a citadel overlooking the river in the ninth century.

The river is also featured in many paintings of the late 18th to early 19th-century painter Francisco de Goya, which show traditionally dressed Madrileños in activities like dancing or having picnics next to the river.

The Manzanares was also an important defence line for the Republican forces during the Siege of Madrid in the Spanish Civil War, and many bunkers can still be seen near the village of Perales del Río. The Bridge of the French was of crucial importance because of its strategic location. There, nationalist forces were repeatedly repelled and denied access to Madrid's city centre.

== See also ==
- List of rivers of Spain
- Praga Bridge
- Puente de Segovia
- Arganzuela Footbridge
- Bridge of Toledo
- Bola del Mundo
