= La Pedriza =

Granite formation in the Guadarrama mountain range, Spain

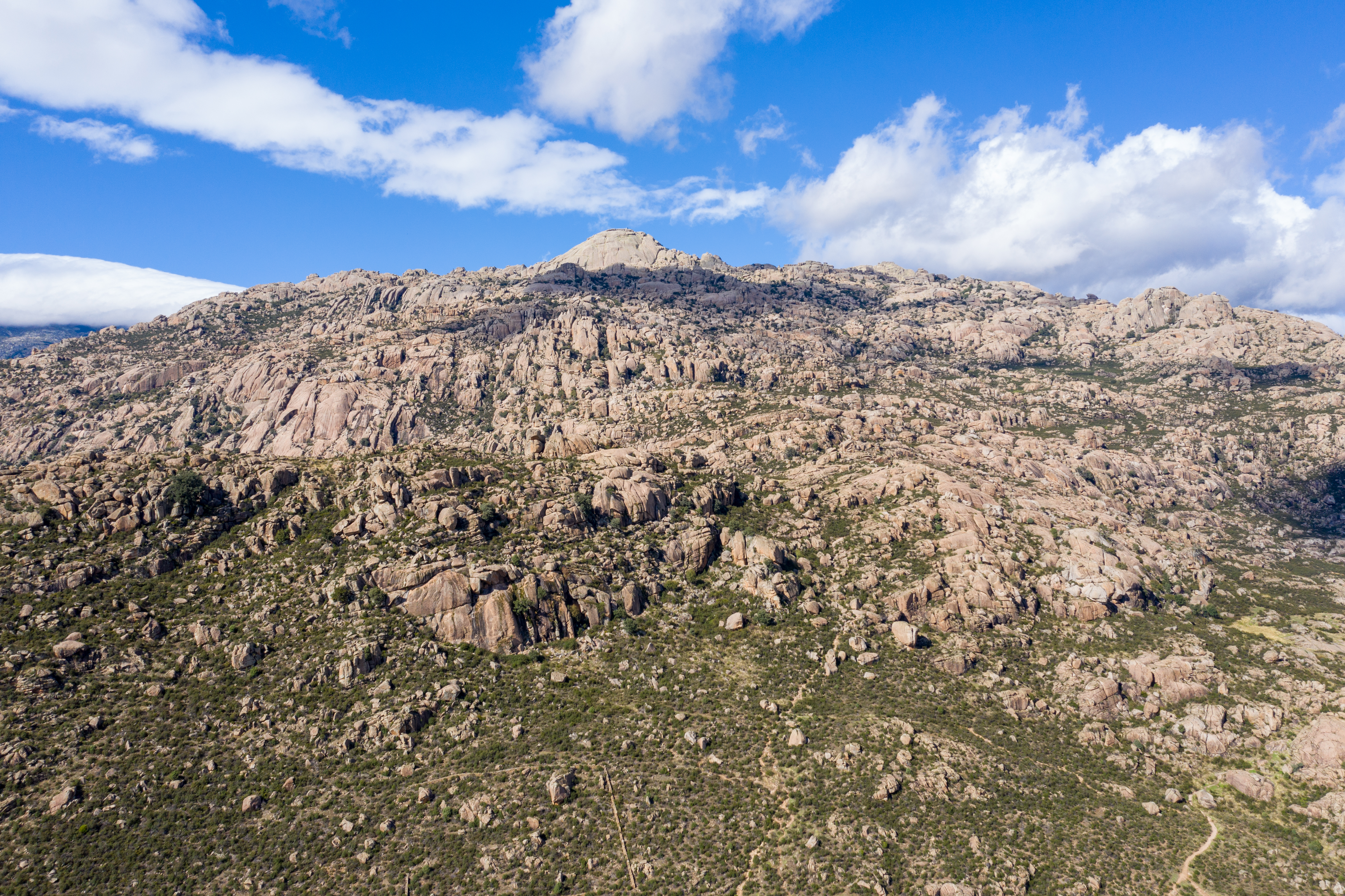
- View of La Pedriza anterior

Highest point
- Elevation: 2,029 m (6,657 ft)
- Coordinates: 40°46′16″N 3°52′32″W

Geography
- Location within Spain
- Location: Spain
- Parent range: Guadarrama mountain range

La Pedriza is a geological feature on the southern slopes of the Guadarrama mountain range of great scenic and leisure interest. Access is from Manzanares el Real, a municipality in the northwest of the Community of Madrid (Spain). Geological forces have created a remarkable boulder field of strangely eroded granitic outcrops, and nearly a thousand rock climbing routes of all difficulties are available to rock climbers, making it an immensely popular locale for rock climbers, especially due to its proximity to Madrid. Hiking is also popular in La Pedriza, especially on weekends.

It is formed by two sub-units: La Pedriza posterior (reaching heights up to 2029 metres above sea level on Las Torres) and La Pedriza anterior, topped by El Yelmo (1719 m).

It is one of the largest granitic ranges of Europe and holds numerous peaks, rocky cliffs, streams and meadows. The 32 square kilometres occupied by La Pedriza lie within the Regional Park of the high river basin of the Manzanares, the largest park in the Community of Madrid. In this zone, vegetation is sparse, but there are Mediterranean shrubs like the rockrose, and alpine varieties like fabaceaes. The fauna is rich in birds of prey; the breeding colony of over 100 pairs of griffon vultures is the largest in the Madrid area.

This natural area has been a location for films such as El Cid, The Fall of the Roman Empire, or Conan the Barbarian.

== Restrictions ==
In 2016 the Community of Madrid introduced new measures to protect the park and address overuse, including restrictions to parking and a prohibition on swimming in the Charca Verde, a popular swimming hole of the Manzanares River within the park. In the summer, until September 30, access to the carpark in Canto Cochino is restricted to 7.30-9.30am and 18.30-22.30 or until all spaces are filled (270). During June, July, August and September, no vehicle is permitted to be in the park overnight. From October 1 to May 31, entrance to the park is until 10.30am and after 4pm on weekends and bank holidays. There is no restriction on weekdays or exit restrictions.

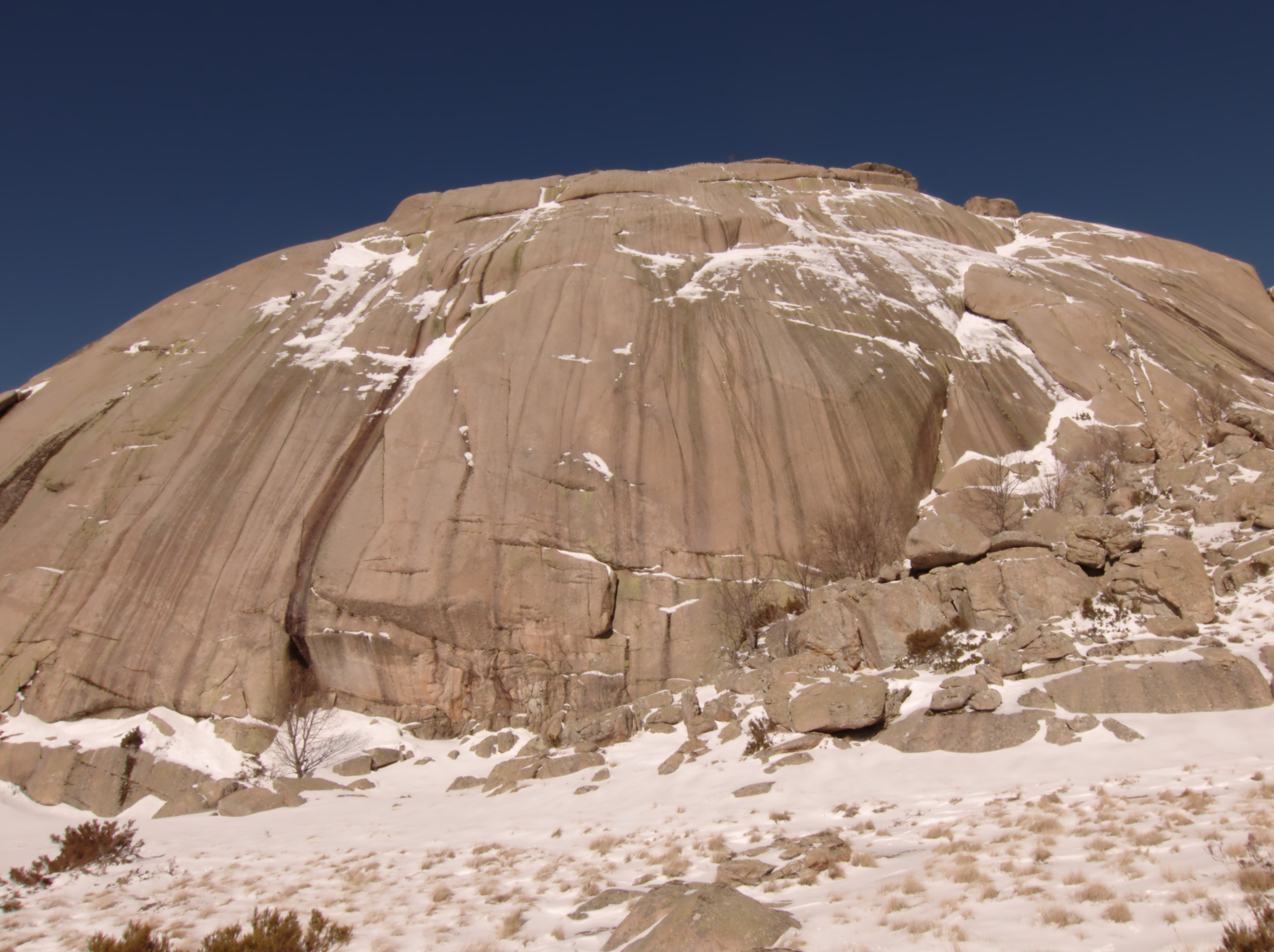
El Yelmo ("The Helmet")

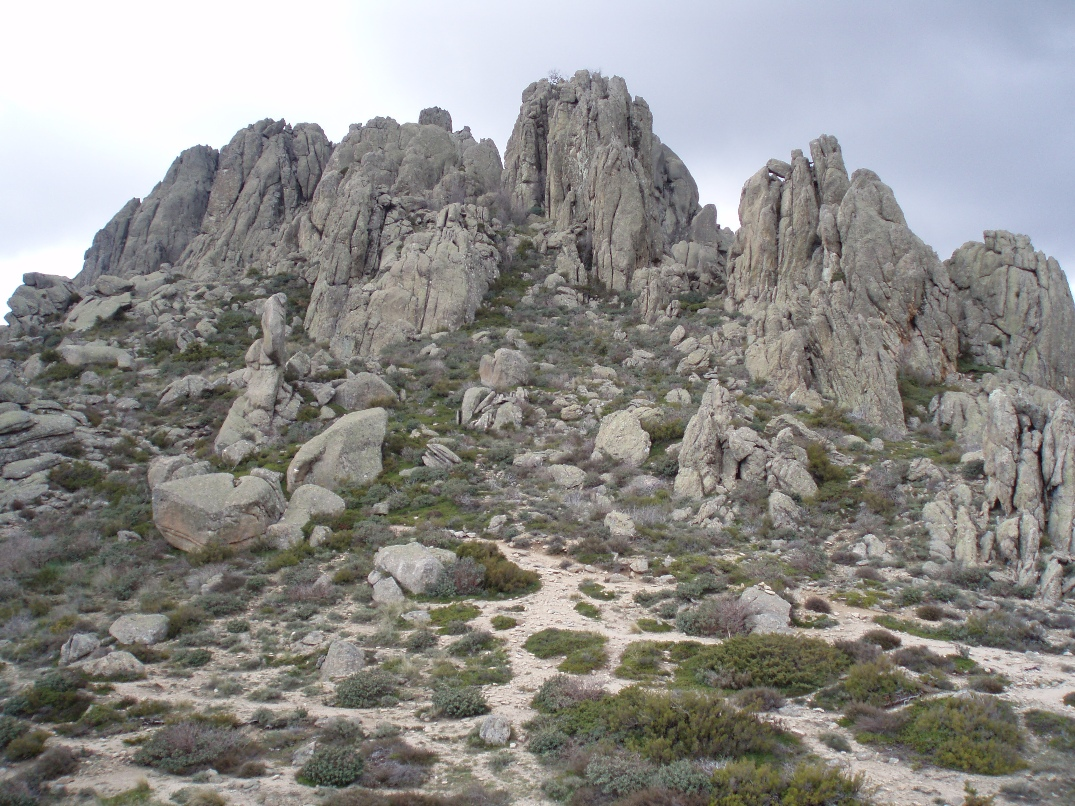
Los Fantasmas ("The Ghosts")

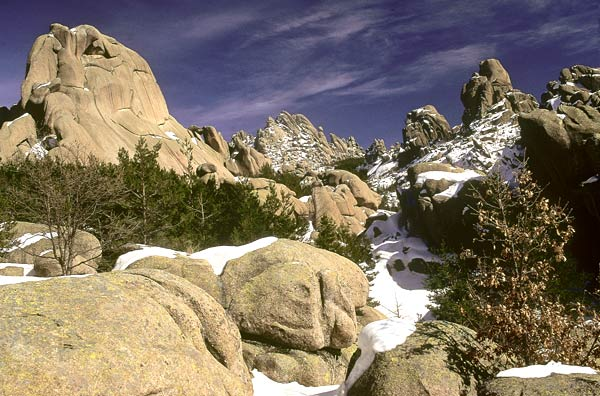
Winter view of La Pedriza's peaks
