= Miraflores de la Sierra =

- Municipality
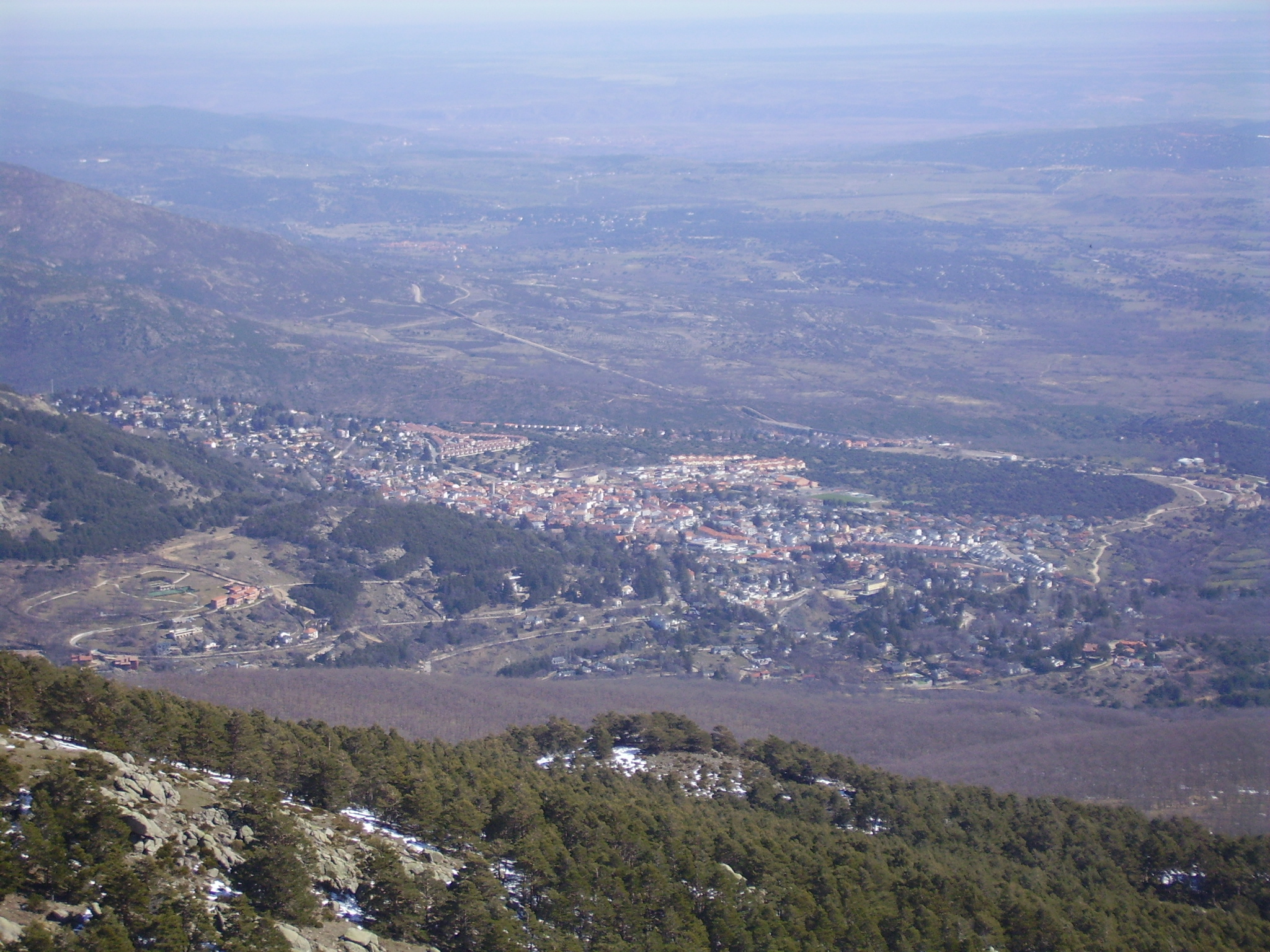
- View of Miraflores de la Sierra from the mountain La Najarra.

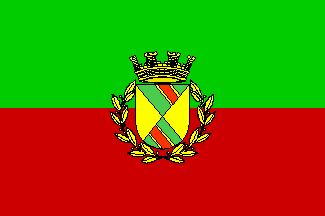
- Flag Coat of arms

- Location in Spain
- Coordinates: 40°48′41″N 3°46′7″W
- Country: Spain
- Autonomous community: Madrid
- Province: Madrid
- Comarca: Cuenca Alta del Manzanares

Government
  - Mayor: Juan Manuel Frutos (PSOE)

Area
  - Total: 56.56 km^{2} (21.84 sq mi)
- Elevation: 1,147 m (3,763 ft)

Population (2025-01-01)
  - Total: 7,350
  - Density: 130/km^{2} (337/sq mi)
- Demonym: Mirafloreños
- Time zone: UTC+1 (CET)
  - Summer (DST): UTC+2 (CEST)
- Website: Official website

Miraflores de la Sierra (Spanish: [miɾaˈfloɾes ðe la ˈsjera]) is a town and municipality in the northern area of the autonomous Community of Madrid, in central Spain, of c. 6,000 inhabitants, located 49 kilometers away from Madrid.

== History ==
Miraflores de la Sierra, formerly known as Porquerizas was established by Segovian farmers in the thirteenth century. According to legend the town was renamed in 1627 by Elisabeth of Bourbon, wife of Philip IV of Spain. Walking to the monastery of Santa María de El Paular she saw the village of Porquerizas surrounded by blooming flowers, at which point she exclaimed Mira, ¡flores! ("look, flowers!").

== Festivities ==
Beginning on 15 August Miraflores de la Sierra celebrates its festivities in honour of the Virgen de la Asunción (Our Lady of the Assumption), patron of the municipality.

3 February, day of Saint Blaise, is also celebrated, as is 15 May, day of San Isidro.

== Transport System ==
The only way to arrive Miraflores de la Sierra in public transport is with bus line 725, which connects it to many other villages and Madrid. Formerly the village, which lies on the Madrid–Burgos railway line, had a train service that connected it with Madrid, Burgos and Irún, but since 2011, the train station is no longer in service due to the collapse of the Somosierra Tunnel (es), which is located north of the station.
