= El Boalo =

Coordinates: 40°42′51″N 3°54′08″W

- Municipality
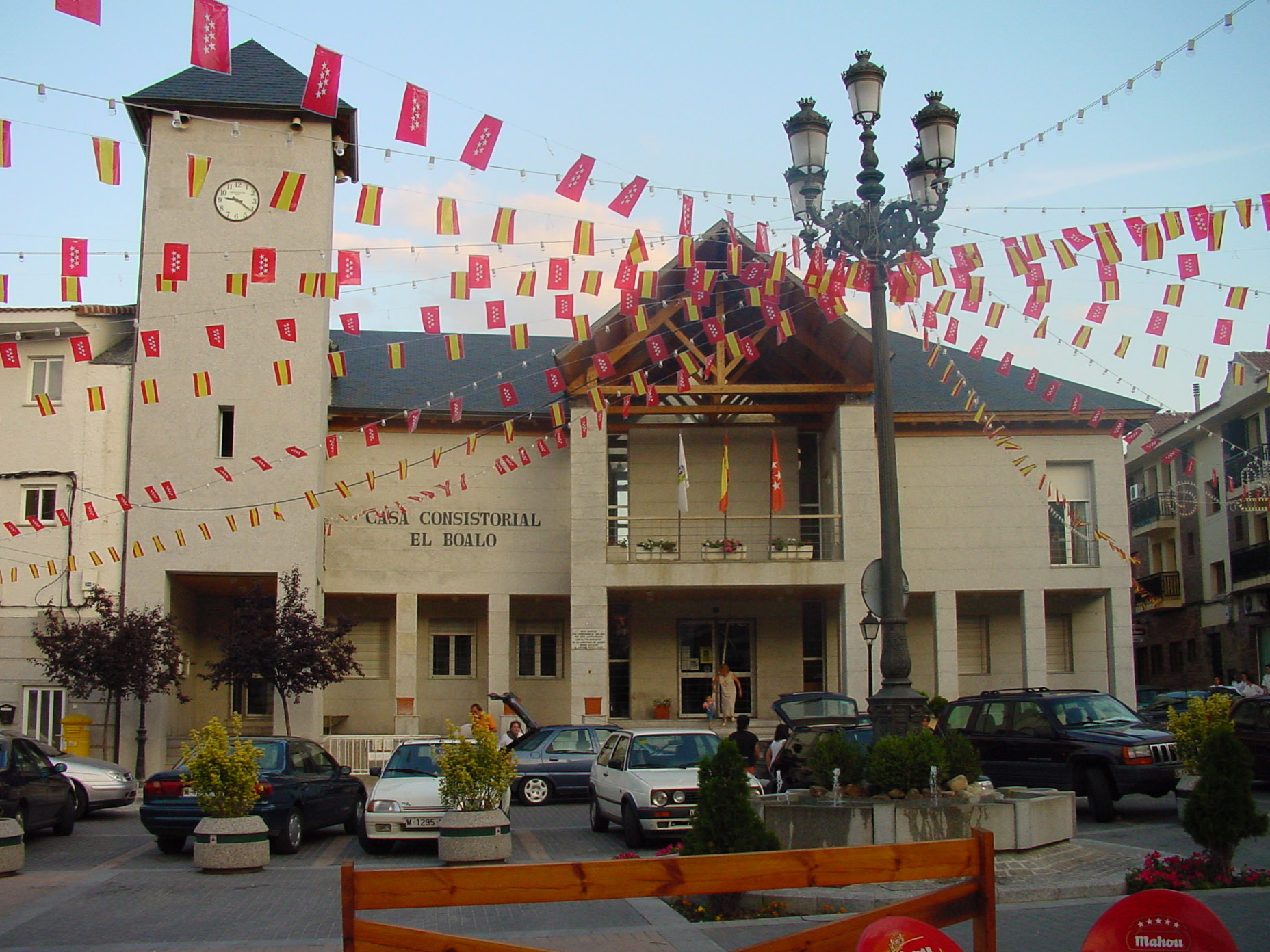
- Town hall of El Boalo

- Flag Coat of arms

- Location of El Boalo in Madrid
- Country: Spain
- Autonomous community: Community of Madrid

Area
  - Total: 39.59 km^{2} (15.29 sq mi)

Population (2024)
  - Total: 8.547
- Time zone: UTC+1 (CET)
  - Summer (DST): UTC+2 (CEST)

El Boalo is a Spanish village of around 8.547 inhabitants, 52 km (32 mi) northwest of Madrid, in the Community of Madrid.

== Bus ==
- 672: Cerceda - Moralzarzal - Madrid (Moncloa)
- 724: El Boalo - Manzanares el Real - Madrid (Plaza de Castilla)
