= Monte de El Pardo =

Natural landscape in Spain

Coordinates: 40°32′N 3°48′W

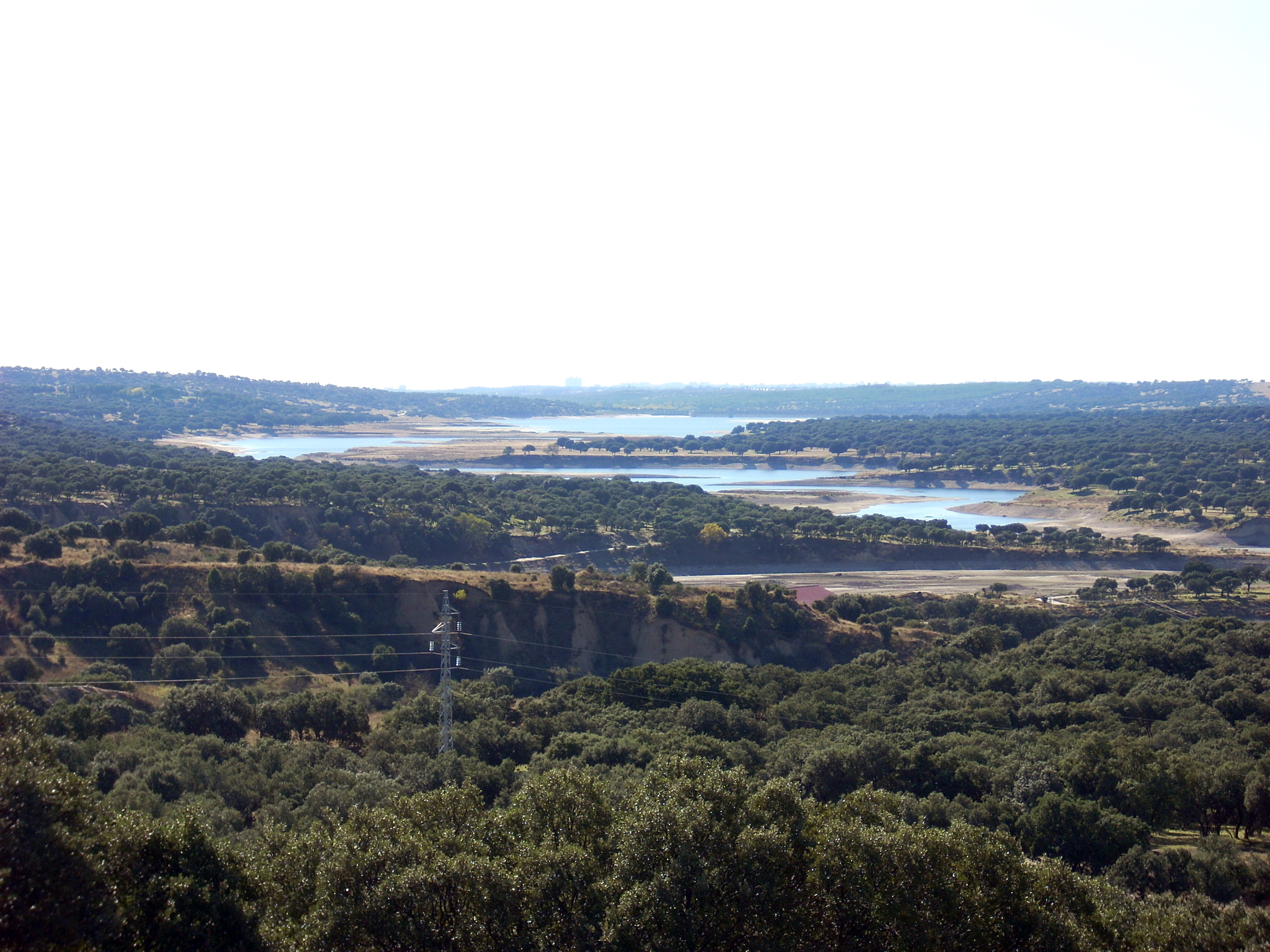
- Interactive map of Monte de El Pardo
- Location: Madrid, Spain
- Area: 15289.12 ha
- Max. elevation: 843 m (2,766 ft)
- Owner: Patrimonio Nacional

The Monte de El Pardo is a large forested area in Madrid, Spain, extending roughly across one quarter of the total municipal area.

The Monte de El Pardo has an area of 15289.12 ha. It was already mentioned as hunting ground in the Alfonso XI's Libro de la Montería (mid 14th century). Reputed to be one of the best preserved mediterranean forests in Europe, it is protected as Special Protection Area (ZEPA in Spanish) since 1987. It is owned by Patrimonio Nacional.

To a large extent, it is an holm oak forest, featuring also another tree varieties such as cork oaks, Valencian oaks, junipers, ashes, Montpellier maples, kermes oaks and willows and scrub plants such as cistus, retama broom bushes, Phillyrea angustifolia, rosemary and Spanish lavender.
