= Manzanares el Real =

- Municipality
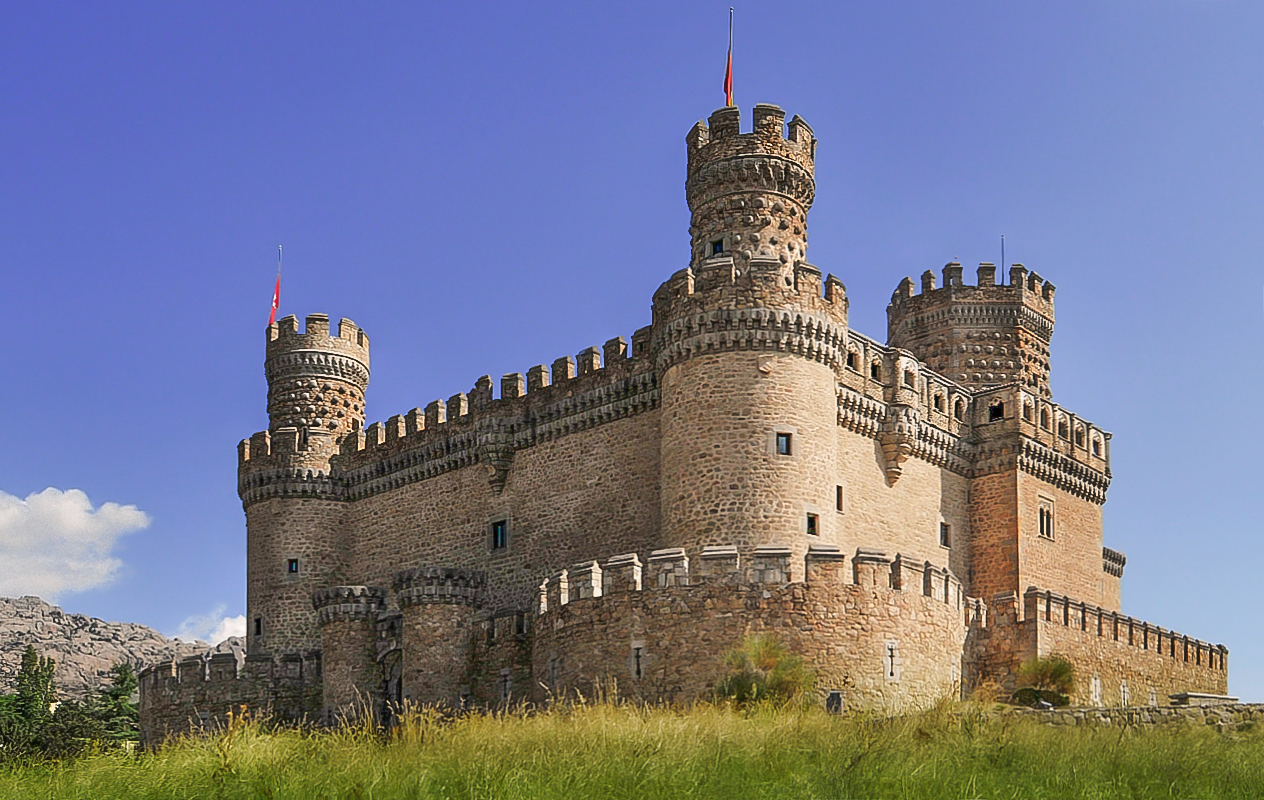
- Castle of the Mendoza in Manzanares el Real

- Flag Coat of arms

- Location in Spain
- Coordinates: 40°43′38″N 3°51′40″W
- Country: Spain
- Autonomous community: Community of Madrid
- Comarca: Cuenca Alta del Manzanares

Government
  - Mayor: José Luis Labrador Vioque

Area
  - Total: 128.4 km^{2} (49.6 sq mi)
- Elevation: 908 m (2,979 ft)

Population (2025-01-01)
  - Total: 9,648
  - Density: 75.14/km^{2} (194.6/sq mi)
- Demonym: Manzanariegos/as
- Time zone: UTC+1 (CET)
  - Summer (DST): UTC+2 (CEST)
- Postal code: 28410
- Website: Official website

Manzanares el Real is a town in the north of the autonomous Community of Madrid. It is located at the foot of La Pedriza, a part of the Sierra de Guadarrama, and next to the embalse de Santillana (the Santillana reservoir). In 2020, the town had 8,936 inhabitants.

== Main sights ==
- The New Castle of Manzanares el Real, the best conserved castle in the Community of Madrid. Construction commencing in 1475, it has been used in several motion pictures, most notably El Cid.
- The Old Castle of Manzanares el Real is the ruin of a former fortress, also known as Plaza de Armas. Only two walls remain standing, now integrated into a garden complex. It was built in Mudejar style of granite with brick curbing.
- Church of Nuestra Señora de las Nieves, founded in the early 14th century. It has a nave and two aisles, separated by arcades on stone columns. The nave, in Romanesque styles, ends into a pentagonal presbytery. The church has also a 16th-century Renaissance portico.
- Hermitage of Nuestra Señora de la Peña Sacra.
- The Town Square and the Town Hall Houses - The Square has always been, and remains the place for celebrations, where local events, celebrations, and social life take place. The Town Hall Houses are peculiar because although our municipality was the head of the County of El Real de Manzanares, they did not exist as such: they were the County jail. It has always preserved its portico, the balcony, and its railings, a construction that may have been commissioned by the Great Cardinal Mendoza in the 16th century.

== Bus ==
There are three lines passing through the village, which are the following:

- SE720: Colmenar Viejo - Manzanares el Real
- 720: Colmenar Viejo - Collado Villalba
- 724: Madrid (Plaza de Castilla) - Manzanares el Real - El Boalo
