= Sierra de Hoyo de Manzanares =

Mountain chain in Spain

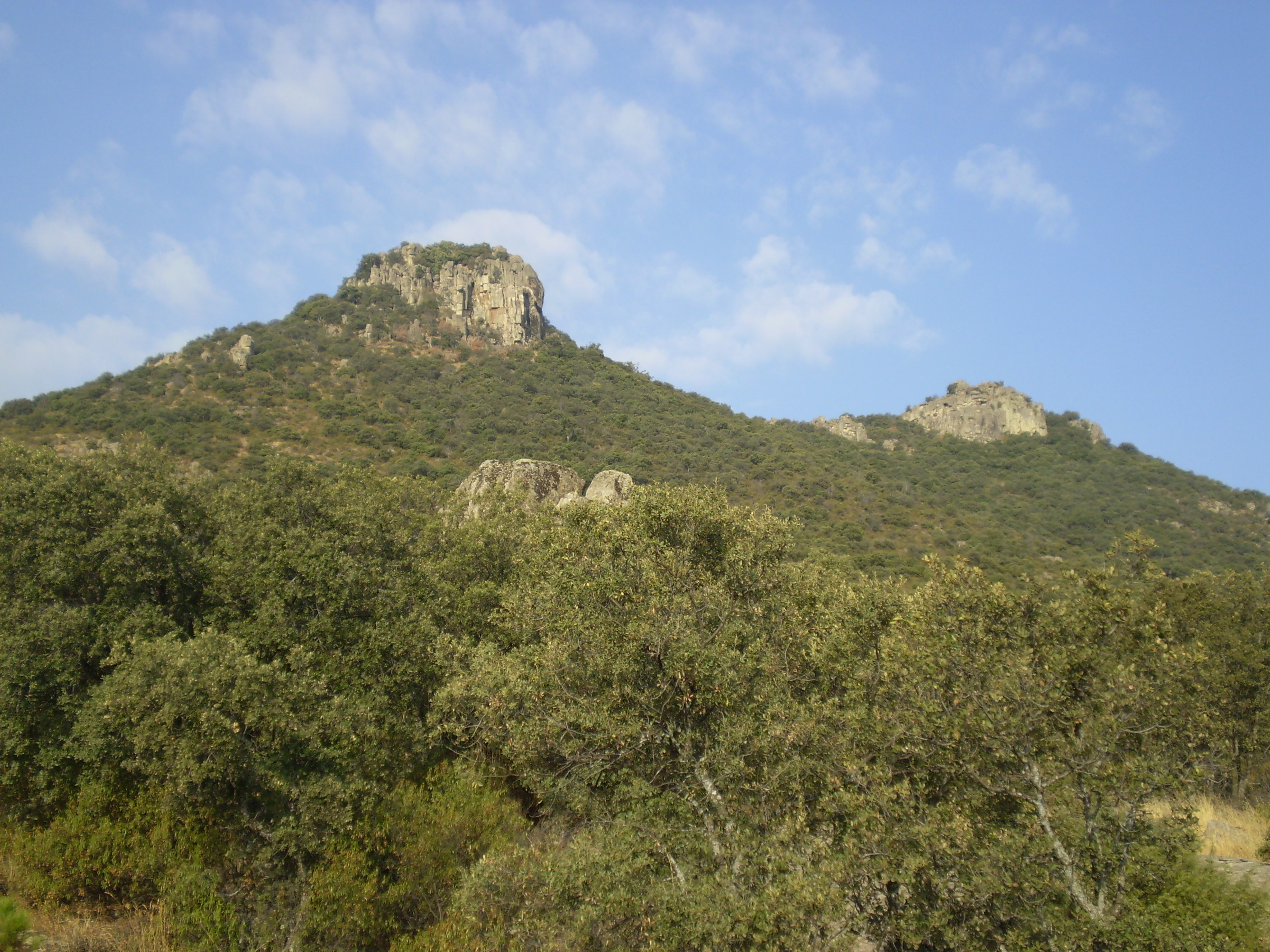
- Southern slope of El Picazo composed by the summit of El Picazo 1268 m (left) and Peña Alonso 1295 m (right in the background), one of the main altitudes of the mountain chain.

Highest point
- Peak: El Estepar (1402,840 meters above sea level)
- Coordinates: 40.633333°N 3.933333°W

Dimensions
- Length: 9 km (5.6 mi)
- Width: 4 km (2.5 mi)
- Area: 14 km^{2} (5.4 mi^{2})

Geography
- Location: Community of Madrid
- Country: Spain
- Parent range: Sierra de Guadarrama, (Sistema Central)

The Sierra de Hoyo or Sierra de Hoyo de Manzanares is a mountain chain located in the northwest of the Community of Madrid (Spain), near the Sierra de Guadarrama. Geologically it belongs to this mountainous formation, but there is a flat separation of about ten kilometers between the two. Its main municipality of reference is Hoyo de Manzanares, located on its southern slope, from which it takes its name.

The entire sierra is within the Cuenca Alta del Manzanares Regional Park, a protected area that also includes La Pedriza with the Santillana reservoir, reaching south to the municipality of Las Rozas de Madrid and encompassing the Soto de Viñuelas next to Tres Cantos. The park receives different levels of protection, among them, the Educational Natural Reserve, the second highest granted by this park. This legal figure protects a good part of its southern and eastern slopes. In addition, on February 15, 1993, the territory was declared a Biosphere Reserve. The highest peak in the Sierra de Hoyo is El Estepar, at 1402.840 meters.

There are several roads leading to the vicinity of this sierra. One of the most direct ways of access is to take the Northwest highway from Madrid to exit 27, Torrelodones M-618 Hoyo de Manzanares, where the M-618 road ends, km 24, which passes through Hoyo de Manzanares, starting in Colmenar Viejo.

The Sierra de Hoyo is visible from a great distance. Its most recognized image is usually its southern elevation, which it offers towards the capital of Spain.

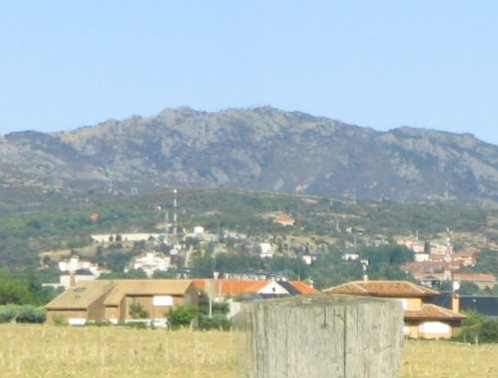
West slope of El Estepar, the highest peak of the Sierra de Hoyo, with 1,402.840 m.

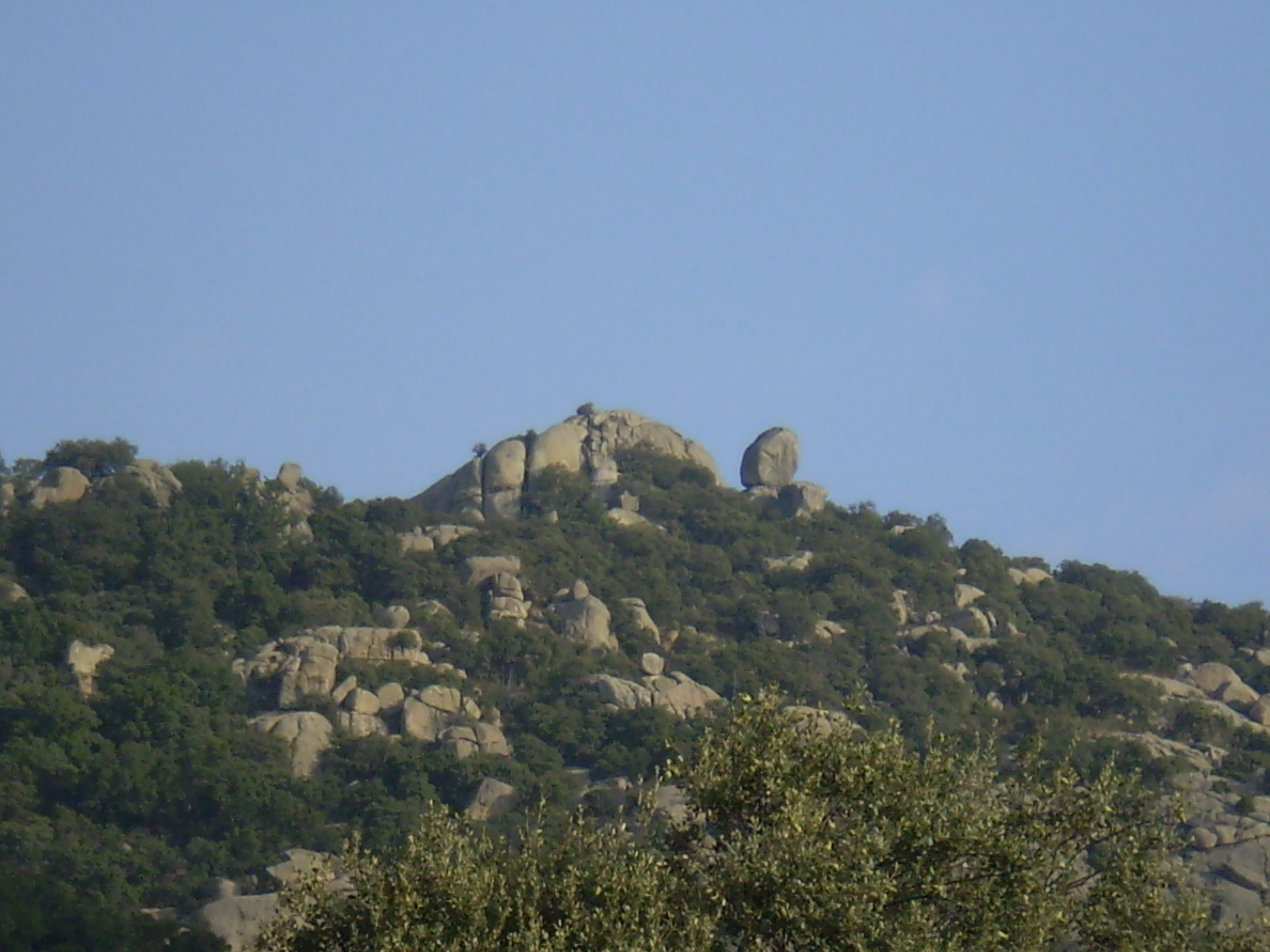
La Tortuga (1368 m), one of the most unique canchales of the Sierra de Hoyo, takes its name from its resemblance to the reptile.

== Physical geography ==
=== Climate ===
The Sierra de Hoyo enjoys a continentalized Mediterranean climate, influenced by altitude and orientation (characterized by cool winters (cold on the peaks) and hot summers, but much more pleasant than those of the southern plateau). The highest average temperatures occur at the foot of the sierra, a clear example is the 14 °C-15 °C average annual temperature in Las Rozas (718 m), going up in altitude we would pass to the 12 °C-13 °C in Hoyo de Manzanares (1002 m), and temperatures above 1200 m will be around 10 °C (this is reflected in the presence of oaks (quercus pyrenaica) and the very rare presence of common juniper (juniperus communis) more typical of the mountain climate). The north face of the Sierra de Hoyo is noticeably cooler than the south.

Precipitations evolve increasing with altitude, so the lowest are in Monte de El Pardo (700 m) around 400–500 L/m², in Hoyo de Manzanares precipitation increases, favored by the sierra that traps the clouds which make Hoyo de Manzanares very rainy when the fronts come from the south-west, so it rains in this town about 600L/m² annual average, which are evident in the abundance of meadows for cattle, the presence of cork oaks, and ash and oak pastures. In the sierra rainfall increases to around 800 L/m², so you can find the presence of eagle ferns (Pteridium aquilinum) and oaks.

In the area of El Pardo, snow is not very common, generally resulting in few snowfalls per year that do not set, between 900 and 1000 m altitude the presence of snow becomes more common (although below the 15 days of snow annual average) producing several snowfalls per year and setting, being easy to exceed in some 5 cm almost every winter (and can reach 15 cm). In the sierra the snowfalls are not usually much more abundant than those at 1000 m, but the cold makes the snow cover can last more than a week above 1200 m (it is rare that the snow lasts more than 2 weeks).

=== Geology ===
The Sierra de Hoyo serves as a natural barrier between the basins of the Manzanares and Guadarrama rivers, which form its eastern and western physical limits, respectively. The valley of the Manzanares also appears in its southeastern part, through the Monte de El Pardo, while, to the north, the so-called Hoya de Villalba extends.

This is one of the main monadnock on the Madrid side of the Sierra de Guadarrama, along with the Sierra de La Cabrera (1564 m), Las Machotas (1466 m), Cerro de San Pedro (1423 m) and Cabeza Mediana (1331 m) in Moralzarzal. All these mountain formations have a lateral and isolated location with respect to the Guadarrama axis, from which they are separated by a series of fractures and faults, which run parallel to the main alignment. Hence, their denomination as monadnock.

The Sierra de Hoyo is distributed forming a sort of inverted arc, whose ends are guarded by the peaks of Navalospinos (1171 m) —to the northeast—, El Picazo (1268 m) ―to the south― and Peña Cardín (1130 m) —to the northwest—. In its southeastern foothills there are different mountains that serve as a transition to El Pardo, as in the case of La Solana (1002 m) in Hoyo de Manzanares and, to the south, the occasional isolated formation rises, as in the case of Canto del Pico (1005.887 m). The latter, within Torrelodones, which is one of the most important granite formations in the surroundings of the sierra, is dominated by a modernist palace, which was owned by Francisco Franco, to which it gives its name.

This sierra is mainly composed of granitic materials and gneisses. It has some cuts of microdiorites. Geomorphologically, it has certain similarities with La Pedriza, given the abundant presence of boulders, canchales and berrocales on its summits, slopes and foothills. Some of them present forms of great singularity, as is the case of La Tortuga —or Cancho de la Parra— (1368 m), so called because of its similarity to the reptile, and Canto del Pico (1011 m), which resembles a bird's beak, on the top of the mountain mentioned above.

The Sierra de Hoyo is presided over by the peak/vertex of Estepar in the place or hill of La Mira, and is located at 1402.840 meters, the maximum altitude of the mountain chain. The following summits in importance are around, up or down, the 1300 meters: above this height peek the Tortuga itself (1368 m), Canto Hastial (1374 m), Peñacovacha (1352 m), Silla del Diablo (1366 m) or the Campanarios (1342 and 1345 m, each), located one on each side of the Collado del Portacho (1306 m) and slightly below are the Cerro del Molinillo (1338 m) Peña Alonso (1295 m) El Picazo (1268 m) —there is a point on the surface, behind the rock at 1273 m, which does not characterize as a peak—. The set of Peña Alonso and El Picazo, is known (as a place) as El Picazo. Solana in the Cerro de las Minas at 1293 m, Navalospinos (1171 m).

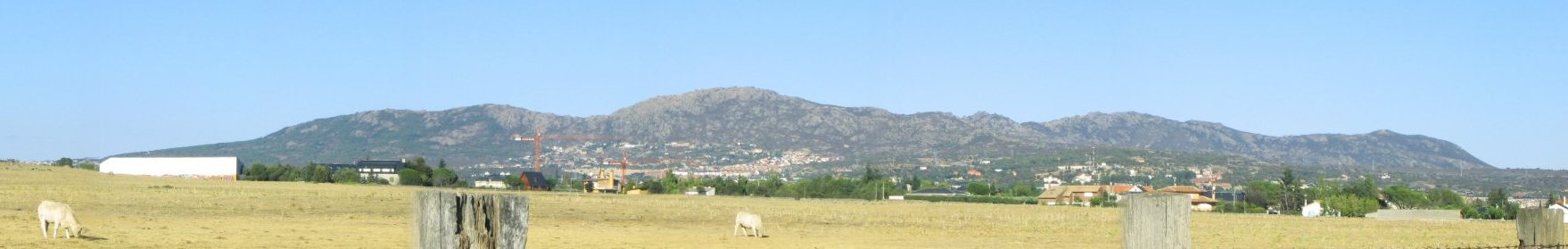
Panoramic view of the Sierra de Hoyo de Manzanares.

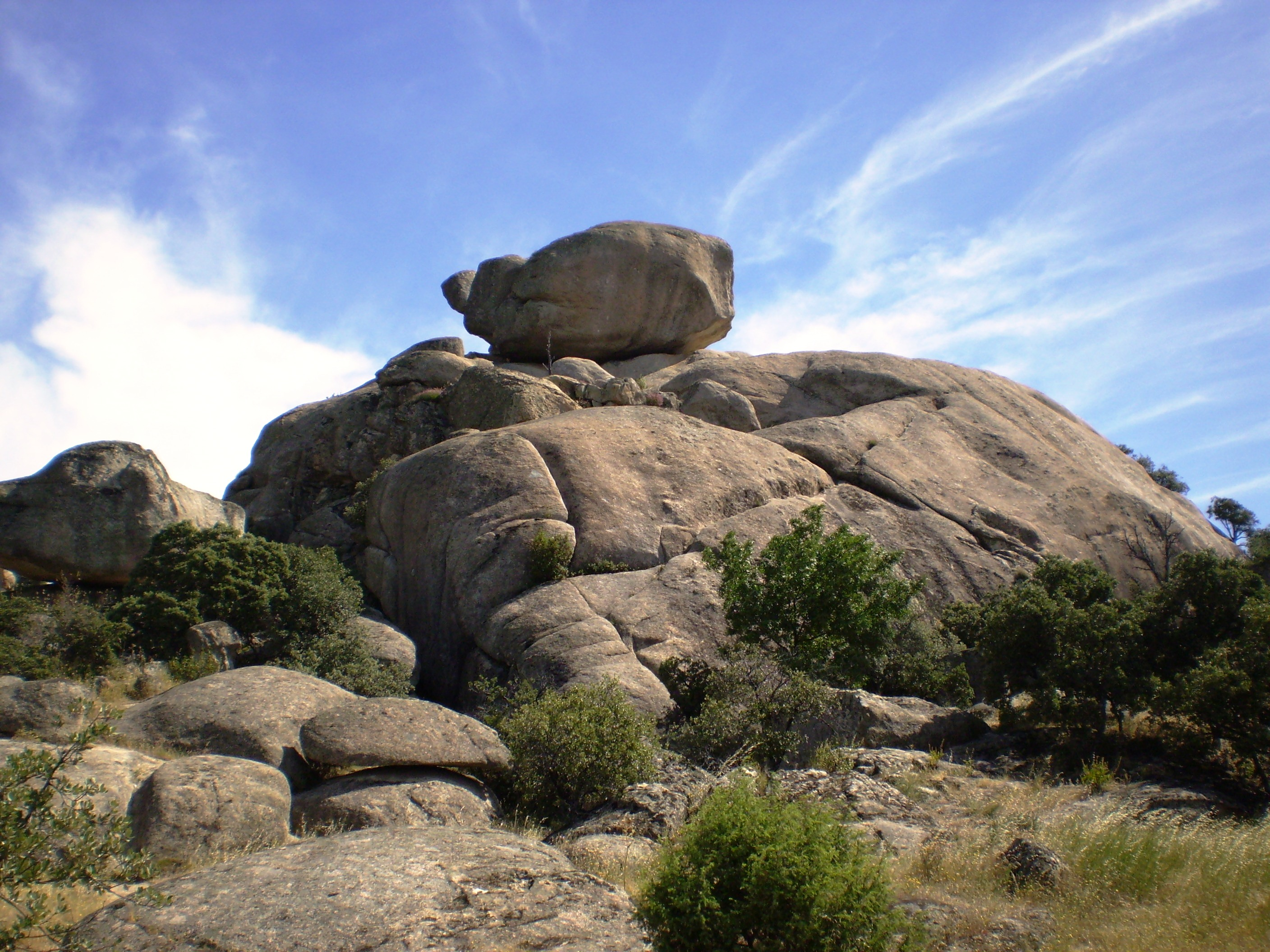
Canto de la Cueva, another of the canchales in the surroundings of the Sierra de Hoyo.

=== Hydrography ===
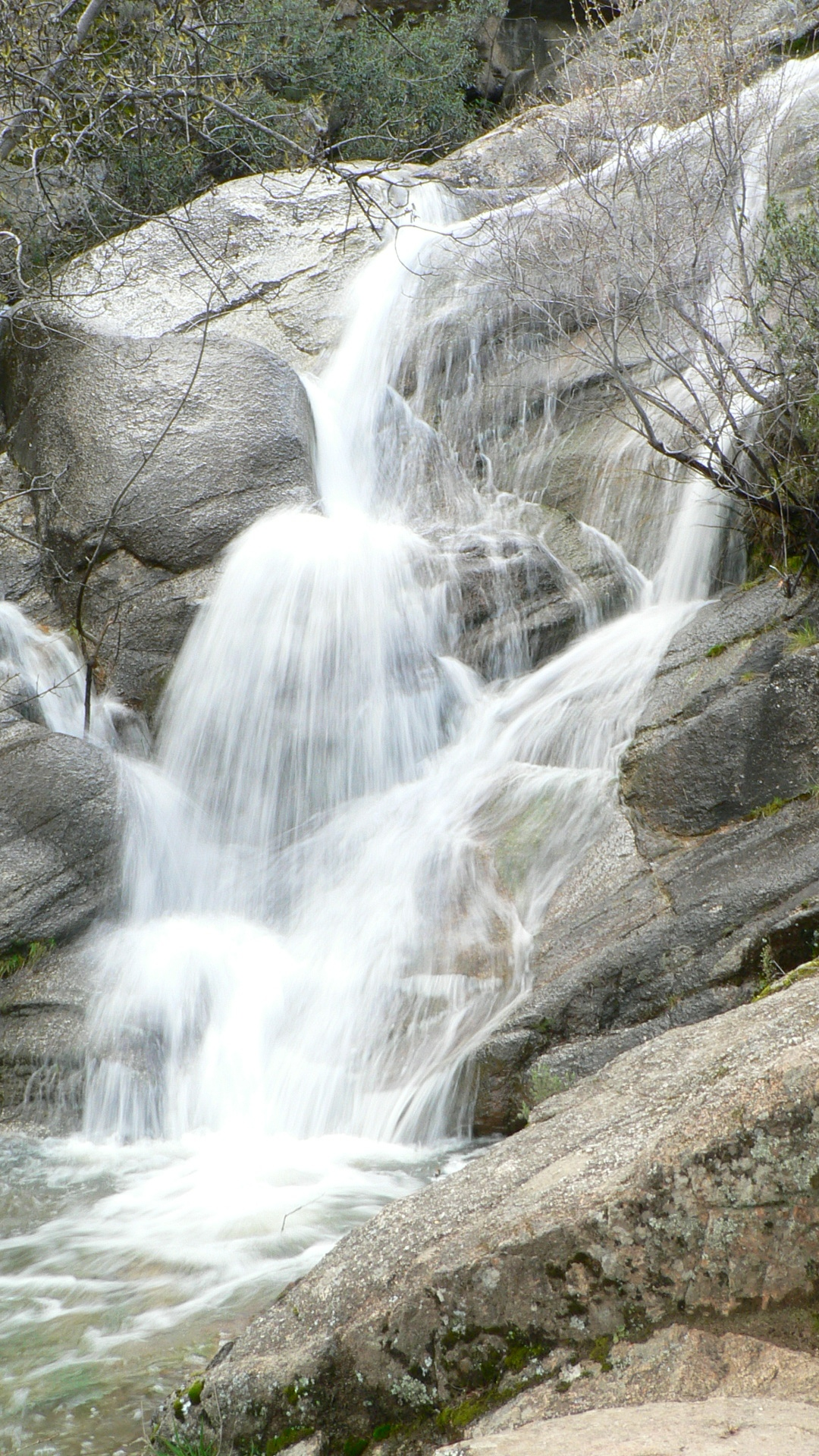
El Covacho waterfall in the Peña Herrera stream.

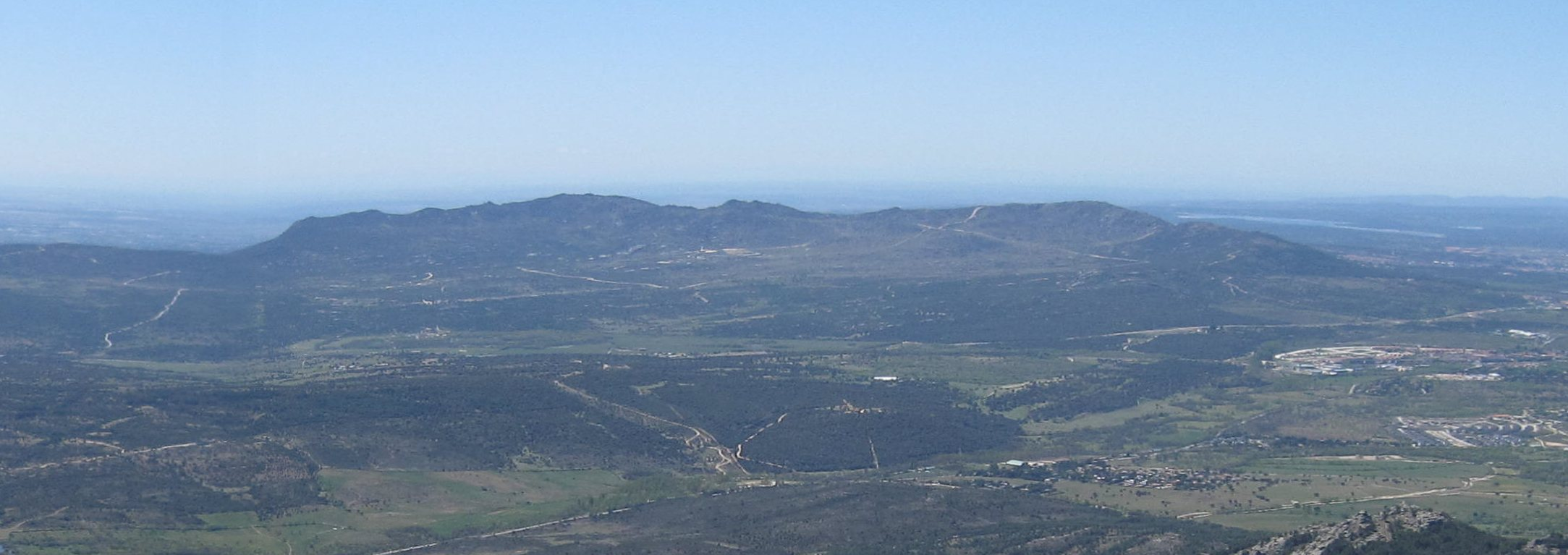
Sierra de Hoyo seen from the summit of El Yelmo, to the north.

This mountain chain is integrated in two basins, the Guadarrama and the Manzanares, both tributaries (the first one) and sub tributaries (the second one, by Jarama del Tagus. In it are born different streams, which, given the continentalized Mediterranean climate of the area, suffer a strong low water. Almost all of them dry up during the summer, except for the streams of Peregrinos (Guadarrama), or Trofas and Navahuerta (Manzanares), with water flowing throughout the year, which can be considered as its main fluvial currents.

Of these it is worth mentioning the Peña Herrera stream, located in the municipality of Moralzarzal, which forms the Cascada del Covacho, a small waterfall of a certain attraction when the stream has enough water.

The Peregrinos stream flows from its northern slope and, after flowing through the vicinity of the residential area of Parquelagos (Galapagar), it flows into the Guadarrama shortly before it passes under the Herrera bridge on the M-519 road from Torrelodones to Galapagar. The streams of La Nava and La Torre, which pass through the municipality of Torrelodones, also flow into this river.

The Manina and Trofas streams, on the other hand, originate on the southern slopes and flow into the Manzanares, after crossing Monte de El Pardo.

This last stream forms the Gabriel Enríquez de la Orden reservoir, located in the foothills of the sierra, in the residential area of Los Peñascales (Torrelodones). This is the main wetland in the mountain chain environment, along with the small reservoir of Los Rosales (around which extends the residential area Parquelagos, in Galapagar), which is supplied with water by the stream of La Pradera.

The Navahuerta stream is located on the northern slope and flows into the Manzanares, to the west of Colmenar Viejo.

=== Flora and fauna ===
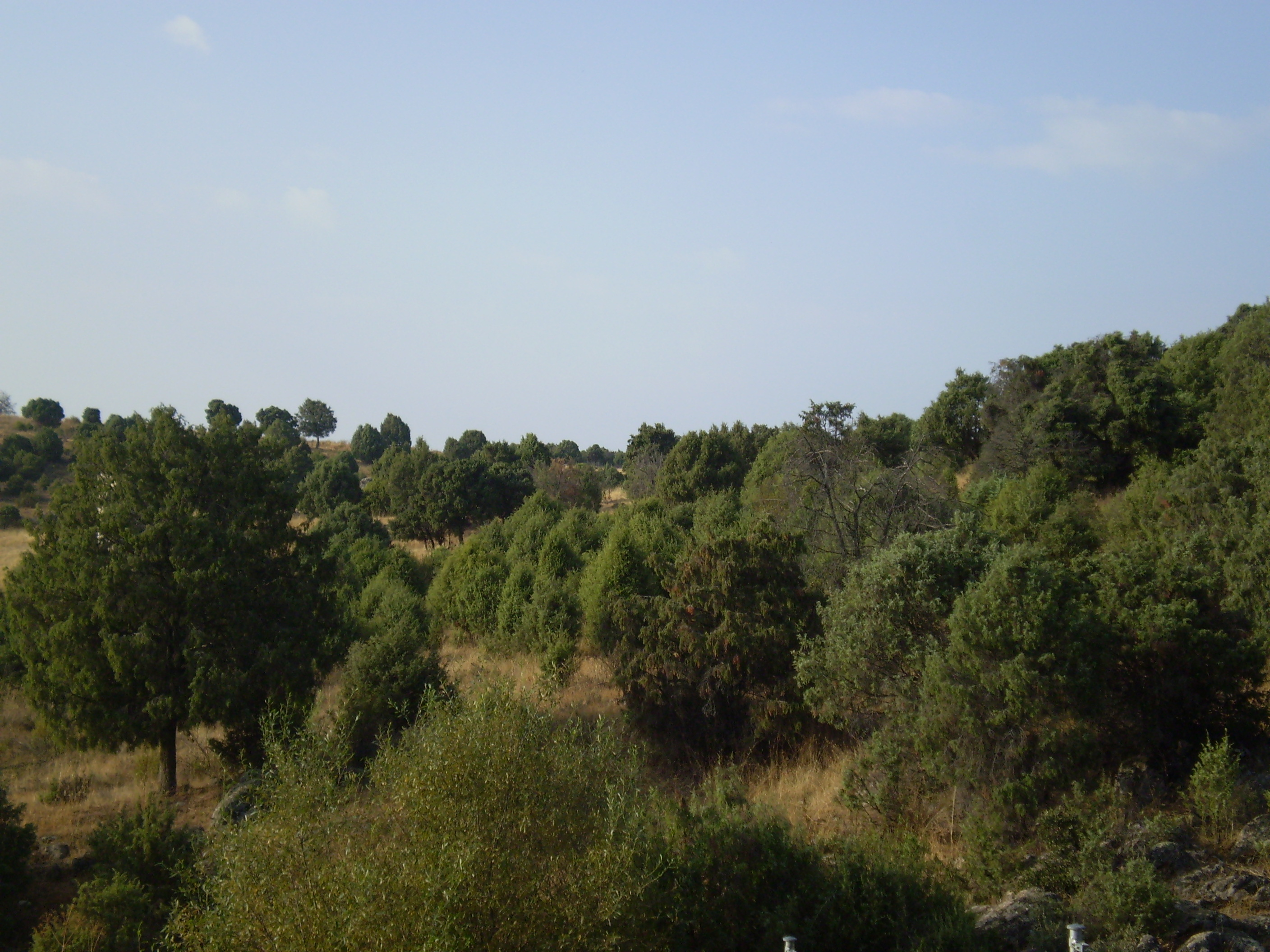
The juniper forest of Hoyo de Manzanares is one of the best preserved in the Community of Madrid.

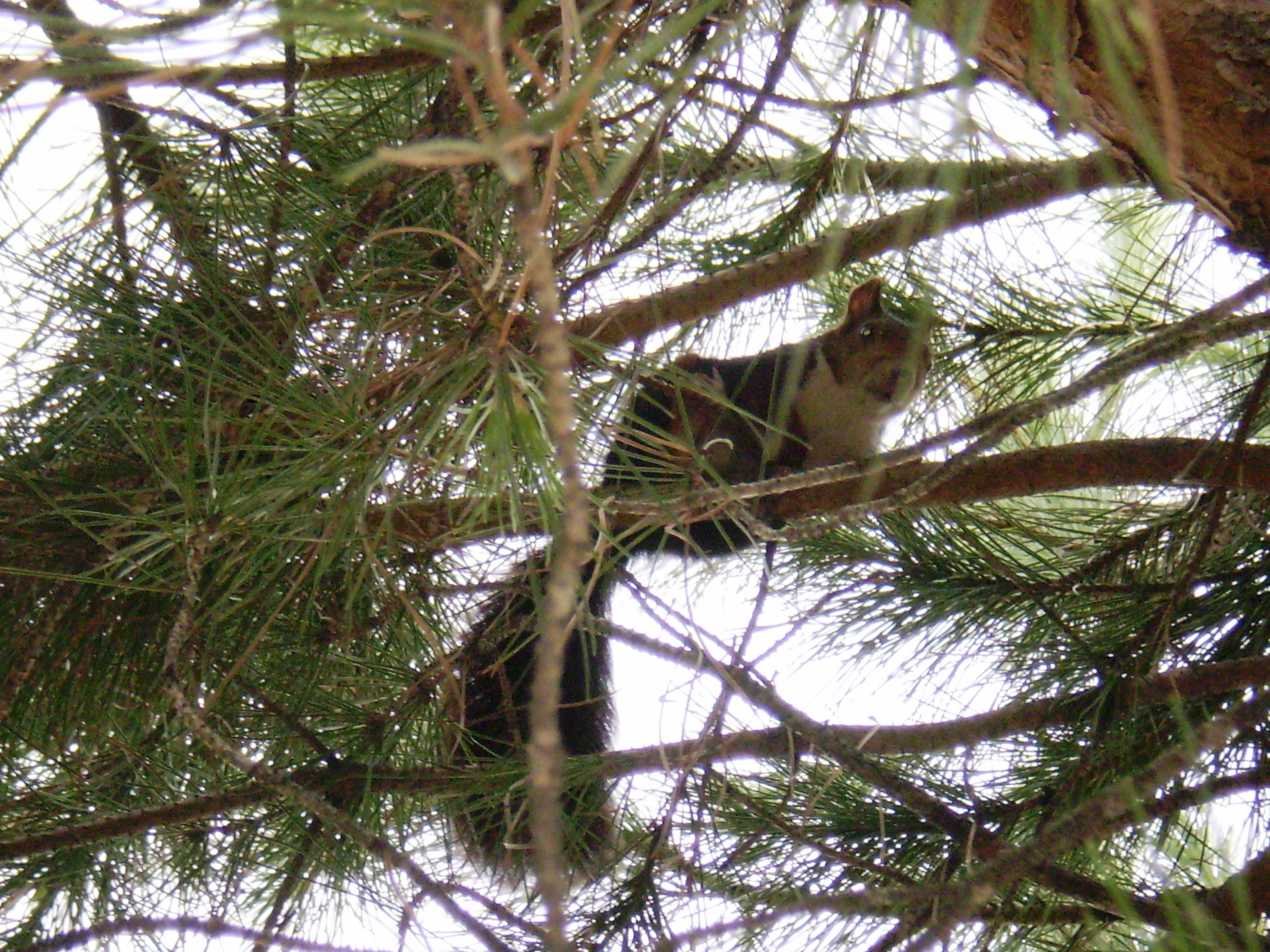
Squirrel in a pine forest in the Sierra de Hoyo.

The vegetation of the Sierra de Hoyo is formed, mainly, by forests, although there are also abundant thickets and grasslands, representative of the Mediterranean flora. Its slopes are covered with holm oaks and junipers, as well as shrubs. Special mention should be made of its cork oak forests, since it is not common to find, in the Iberian Peninsula, forests of this type in the altitudinal range in which the mountain chain is located.

On its southern slope, within the municipality of Hoyo de Manzanares, is one of the best preserved juniper groves in the Community of Madrid. It is a species of juniperus oxycedrus, commonly known as juniper de miera or cedar of Spain, characteristic of the Mediterranean region.

Towards the south, the juniper groves give way to holm oak groves, which populate some mountains of ecological interest, such as those of the El Pendolero and Cantos Negros estates —the latter zoned as a Natural Reserve by the Cuenca Alta del Manzanares Regional Park—, which then extend towards El Pardo.

There are also populations of ash trees along the streams and brooks that run through the sierra. In areas where the forest has been more degraded, forests have been replaced by shrubs (rockrose, retama...) and aromatic plants such as lavender, thyme and rosemary.

In reference to the fauna, the avian fauna occupies a prominent place. Corvids such as the iberian magpie, birds of prey such as booted eagles, buzzards, kites and griffon vultures join other species such as hoopoes and bee-eaters.

Regarding mammals, the main inhabitants are the squirrel, the wild boar, the rabbit and, to a much lesser extent, the fox, the genet and the dormouse. At the foot of the mountain chain, temporary ponds are formed, where an interesting amphibian fauna gathers, with species such as the common frog, the true toad, the natterjack toad, the spadefoot toad, the midwife toad, the pygmy newt and the ribbed newt.

== Urban Geography ==
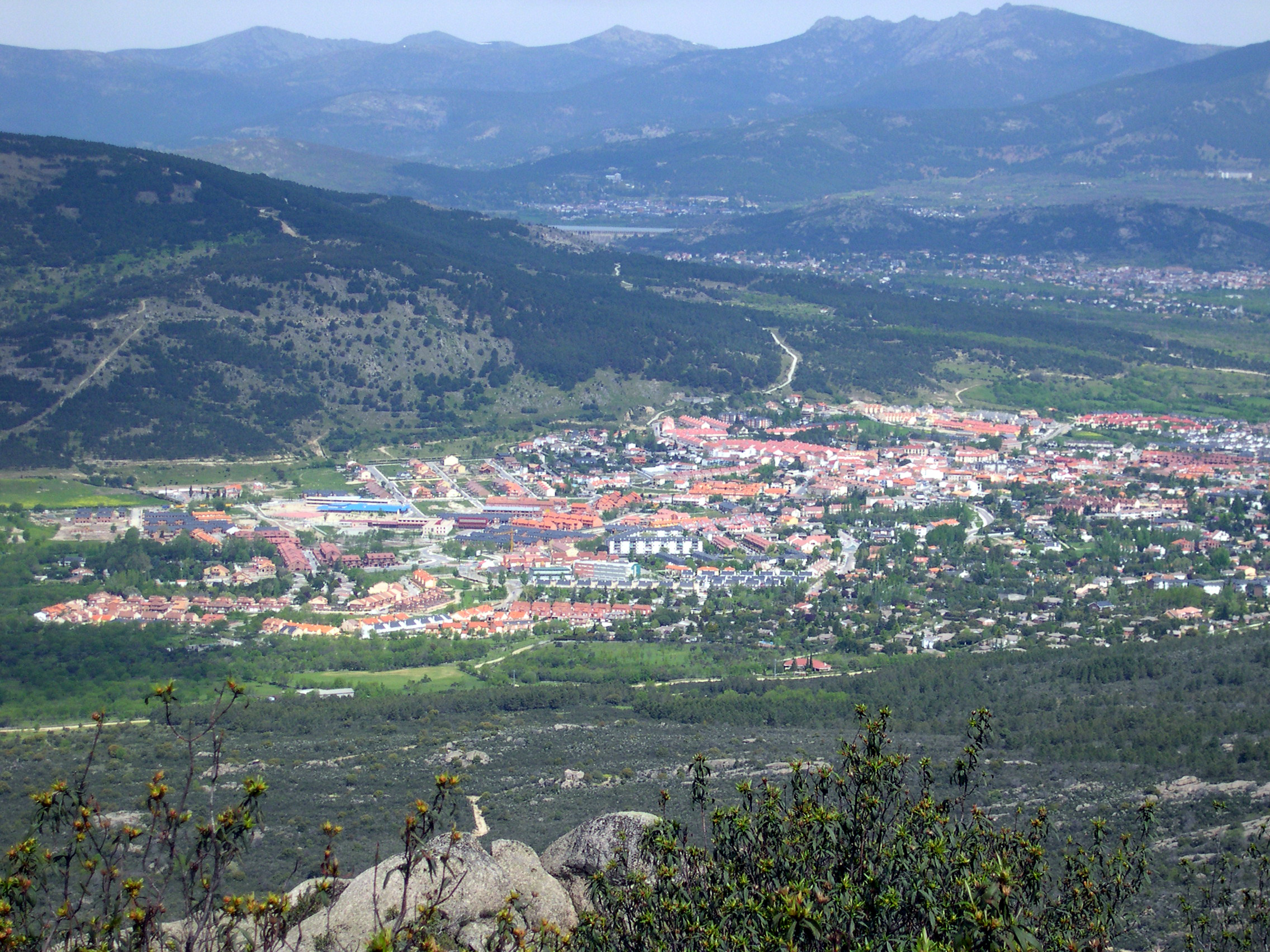
Moralzarzal, a municipality located on the northern slope of the Sierra de Hoyo. The image is taken from the Canto Hastial (1376 m), one of the main peaks of this mountainous formation.

The Sierra de Hoyo is surrounded by numerous residential areas, towns and roads, which exert a strong demographic and construction pressure on it (some residential areas have been built on its slopes).

It is one of the busiest residential areas of the Community of Madrid, which is also very well connected by the A-6 (Northwest Highway), which runs at the foot of its western slopes. Other important roads are the regional M-608 Venturada-Collado Villalba, which passes along its northern slope to the northwest, and the local M-618, in its southern part.

To the south of the mountain chain is Hoyo de Manzanares and, bordering it to the west, are the residential areas of Parquelagos (Galapagar) and La Berzosa (Hoyo de Manzanares) and the municipality of Collado Villalba. The latter includes two important urban areas (La Estación and El Pueblo), where almost 60,000 inhabitants live on a stable basis, to which must be added the floating population.

Further north, to the north, are Moralzarzal and Cerceda, one of the three nuclei that make up the municipality of El Boalo.

== Artistic heritage ==
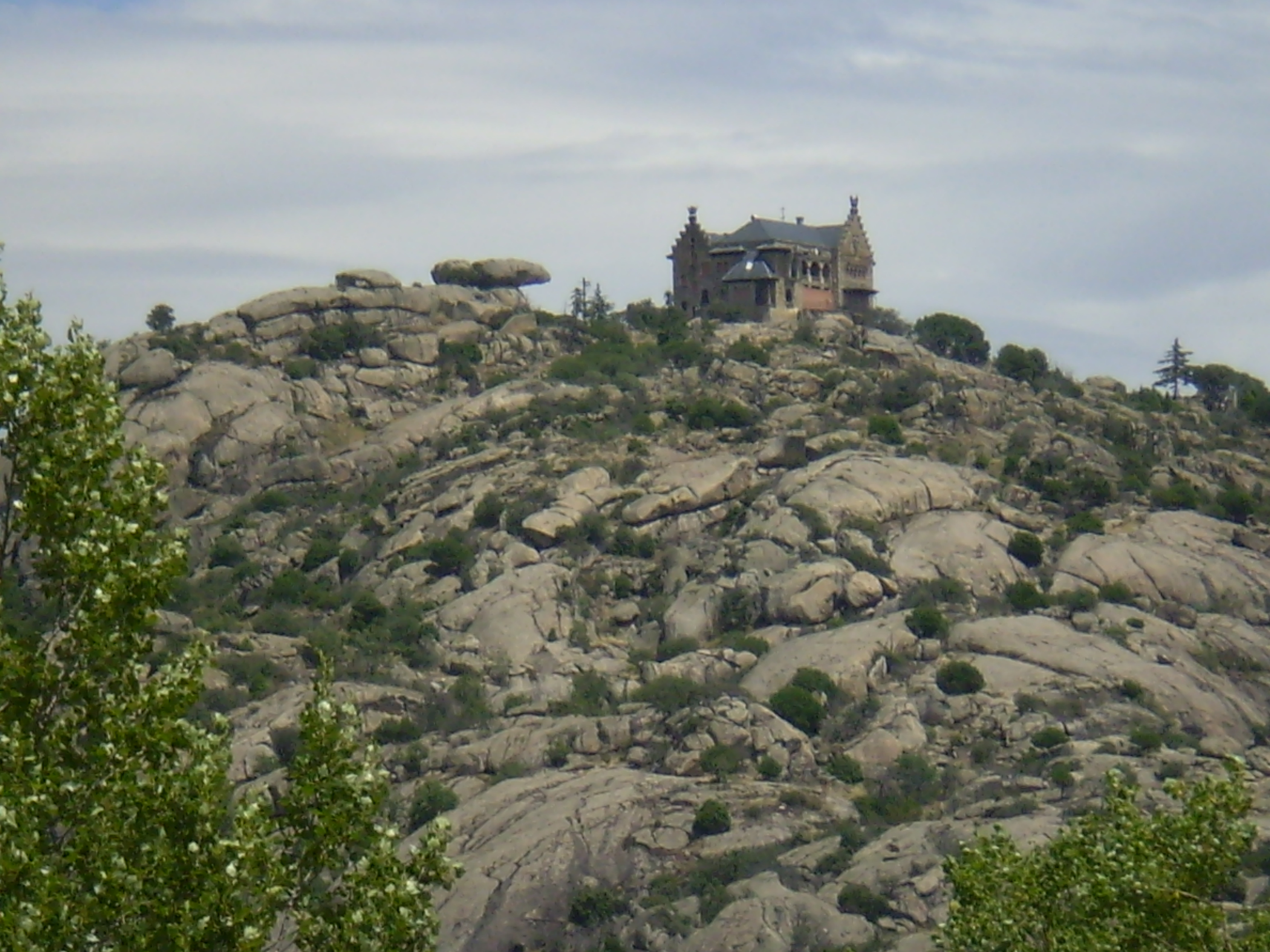
The Palace of Canto del Pico next to the vertex from which it receives its name, one of the most important granite formations in the surroundings of the Sierra de Hoyo. It is located at 1005,887 m of altitude.

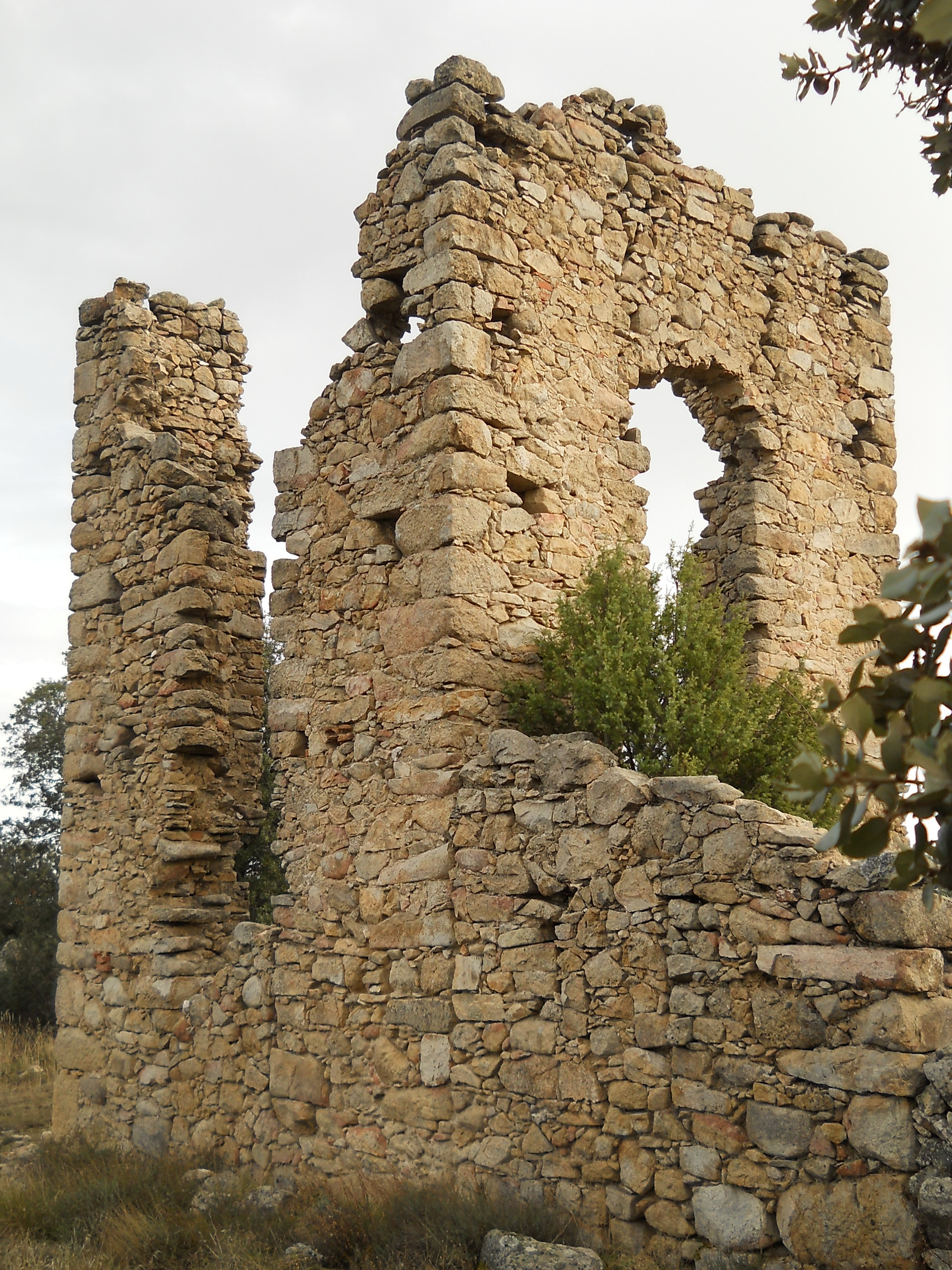
Tower of La Mira de Hoyo de Manzanares

During the Andalusian period, the Sierra de Hoyo was part of the defensive system organized by the Muslim population to stop the advance of the Christian kingdoms. Two watchtowers are still standing, built between the 9th and 11th centuries, which performed a surveillance function. La Torrecilla, in a ruinous state, is located on the maneuvering field of the Academy of the Corps of Engineers in Hoyo de Manzanares. It gives its name to the Collado de la Torrecilla, 1185 m above sea level. Better preserved is the Torrelodones watchtower, in the municipality of the same name, although it has undergone transformations.

The other, on the crest of the sierra, between Estepar and La Tortuga, is also in ruins.

At the beginning of the 20th century, different mansions and small palaces were built in the surroundings of the Sierra de Hoyo for residential use. Some monumental buildings are still preserved, such as the old Hostal de La Berzosa (today the headquarters of the Antonio de Nebrija University), in the residential area of the same name, belonging to Hoyo de Manzanares. In the same municipality of Hoyo, to the south, near neighboring Torrelodones, the El Pendolero estate stands out, which was the residence of Antonio Maura, with access from that municipality, and in Torrelodones, the former INI residence of Los Peñascales and the Palace of Canto del Pico, declared a historic and artistic monument in 1930.

== El Estepar ==
El Estepar
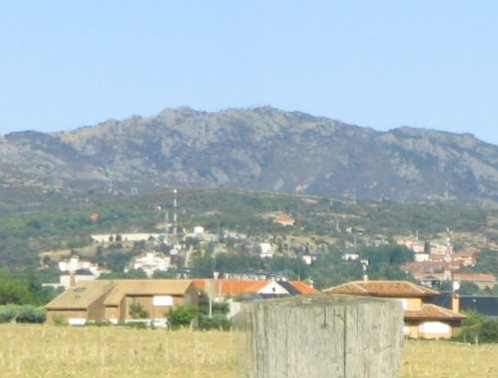
- Western slope of El Estepar viewed from El Escorial

Highest point
- Elevation: 1,403 m (4,603 ft)
- Prominence: 434 m (1,424 ft)

Geography
- Location: Spain; Community of Madrid (northwest)
- Parent range: Sierra de Guadarrama, Sistema Central

Geology
- Mountain type(s): Mountain massif of granite and gneiss

El Estepar is the highest peak of the Sierra de Hoyo de Manzanares, a mountainous alignment located on the periphery of the Sierra de Guadarrama, 3 km from it. It is situated in the northwest of the Community of Madrid (Spain), between the municipalities of Cerceda, Moralzarzal, Collado Villalba, and Hoyo de Manzanares. It has an elevation of 1,403 meters and is located within the Cuenca Alta del Manzanares Regional Park.

The slopes of this mountain are dotted with large rocks and granite outcrops, and covered with holm oaks, stone pines, oaks (Quercus pyrenaica), cork oaks, and Mediterranean shrubs, among which rockrose and broom stand out.

== Interesting facts ==
In the municipality of Hoyo de Manzanares are the remains of some old movie sets, where many films were shot in the 1960s and 1970s, mainly Spaghetti Westerns (among them, A Fistful of Dollars).

In addition, there are still some remains on the ground nearby of what was once the street that appeared in the movie/musical Chicago.

On the El Pendolero estate, the film director Carlos Saura set the action of two of his best-known films, Ana and the Wolves (1972) and its sequel Mama Turns 100 (1979).

== See also ==
- Sierra de Guadarrama
- Cuenca Alta del Manzanares Regional Park

=== Peaks of the Sierra de Hoyo ===
Highest point and main summit

Estepar (Hoyo de Manzanares) 1402,840 meters above sea level at the Permanent Station of the Port of Alicante (Geodesic Vertex).

- Solana (Moralzarzal) 1292,623 meters above sea level (geodesic vertex).
- Canto Hastial 1374 m
- Peña Covacha 1352 m
- Silla del Diablo 1366 m
- Cerro del Molinillo 1338 m
- Peña Herrera 1289 m
- El Cuchillar 1204 m
- Peña de El Búho 1264 m
- Peña Alonso 1295 m
- El Picazo 1268 m
- Cancho de la Parra or La Tortuga 1368 m
- Campanario Pequeño 1343 m
- Campanario Grande 1345 m
- Riscos de Matalasgrajas 1323 m
- Pico de Matalasgrajas 1205 m
- Cerro Saluda 1199 m
- Cerro de Navalospinos 1171 m
- Calvache 1106.962 meters above sea level (geodetic vertex).

Source: IGN. Geodetic Vertices: Rest of elevations: National Topographic Map.

=== Fluvial streams ===
- Navahuerta stream
- Manina stream
- Trofas stream
- Peregrinos stream

=== Monuments ===
- Watchtower of Torrelodones
- Palace of Canto del Pico

=== Other monadnock of the mountain chain of Guadarrama ===
- Cabeza Mediana
- Cerro de San Pedro
- Las Machotas
- Sierra de La Cabrera
- Sierra de Ojos Albos
