= Galapagar =

- Municipality
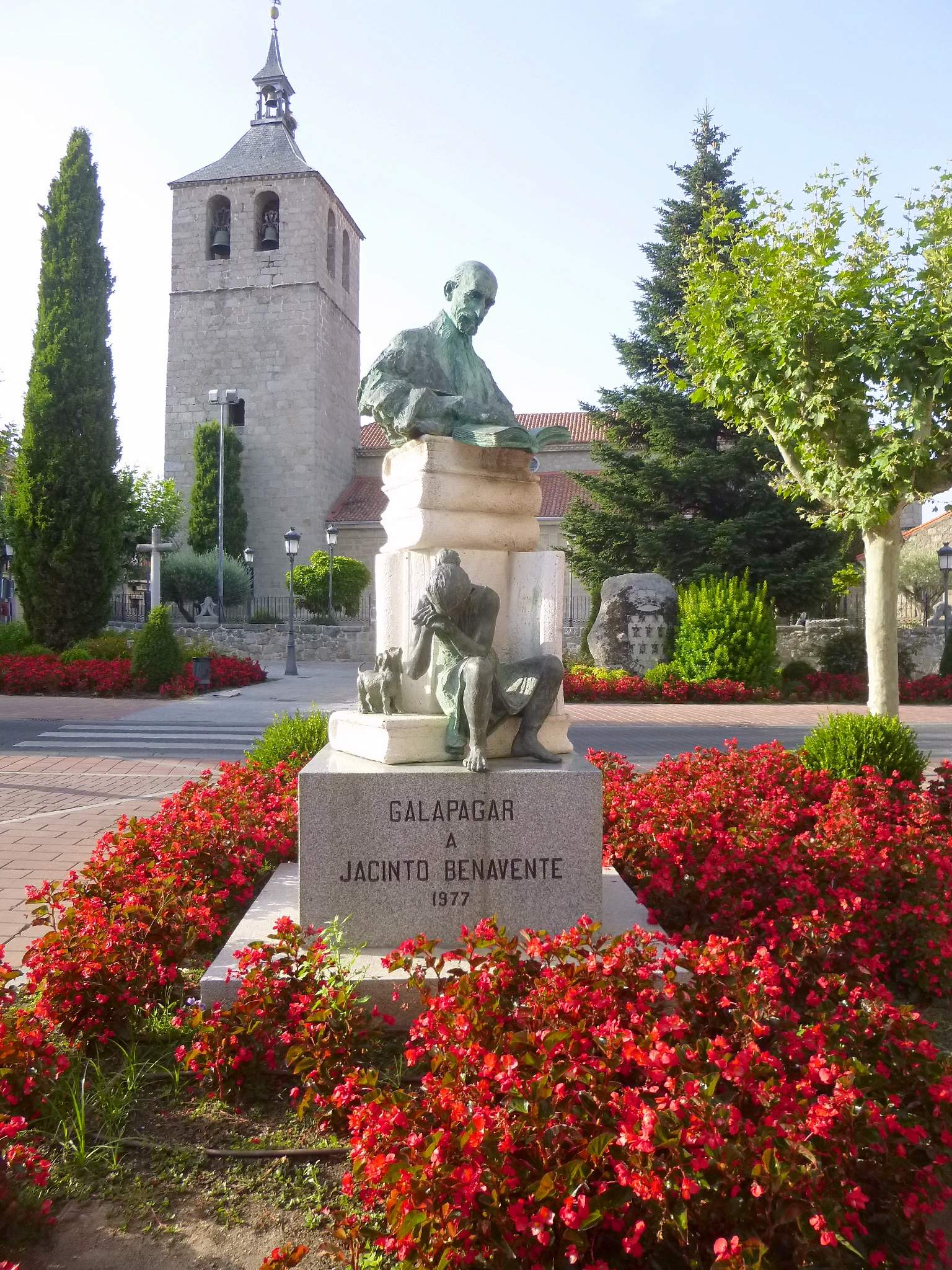
- City centre of Galapagar; the sculpture is by Luis Sanguino.

- Flag Coat of arms

- Location in Spain Galapagar (Spain)
- Coordinates: 40°34′35″N 4°0′7″W
- Country: Spain
- Community: Community of Madrid
- Province: Madrid
- Comarca: Guadarrama

Government
  - Mayor: Carla Greciano (PP)

Area
  - Total: 65 km^{2} (25 sq mi)
- Elevation: 881 m (2,890 ft)

Population (2025-01-01)
  - Total: 36,758
  - Density: 570/km^{2} (1,500/sq mi)
- Demonym: Galapagueños
- Time zone: UTC+1 (CET)
  - Summer (DST): UTC+2 (CEST)
- Postal code: 28260
- Website: Official website

Galapagar is a town and municipality northwest of Madrid, Spain, situated in the autonomous community of the Community of Madrid. Of all the towns in the area, it has experienced the most growth, mostly because of immigration and the development of old livestock fields.

Galapagar borders Collado Villalba, Colmenarejo, Torrelodones, Las Rozas de Madrid, El Escorial, San Lorenzo de El Escorial, Villanueva del Pardillo, Hoyo de Manzanares, Moralzarzal and Guadarrama.

The name Galapagar comes from the Spanish galápago, meaning turtle, as the town centre was sited near a lake full of turtles. The town first appears as a village in the eleventh century, its importance due to the frequent hunting expeditions by the Spanish royalty, and being a main stop on the road from the capital to the Royal Monastery of San Lorenzo de El Escorial. Sights in the town include the church of The Asunción (Assumption).

Galapagar is served by lines C-3, C-8 and C-10 of the Cercanías Madrid commuter rail service at its Galapagar-La Navata train station; and by 9 lines of the Interurban Bus Service linking it to the Moncloa district of Madrid.

Jacinto Benavente, one of the foremost Spanish dramatists of the 20th century and 1922 laurate of the Nobel Prize in Literature, is buried here.

Bullfighting, stock-breeding, pasturing and beef production are the main activities in Galapagar.

== See also ==
- Los Negrales
