= Collado Villalba =

Collado Villalba Villalba
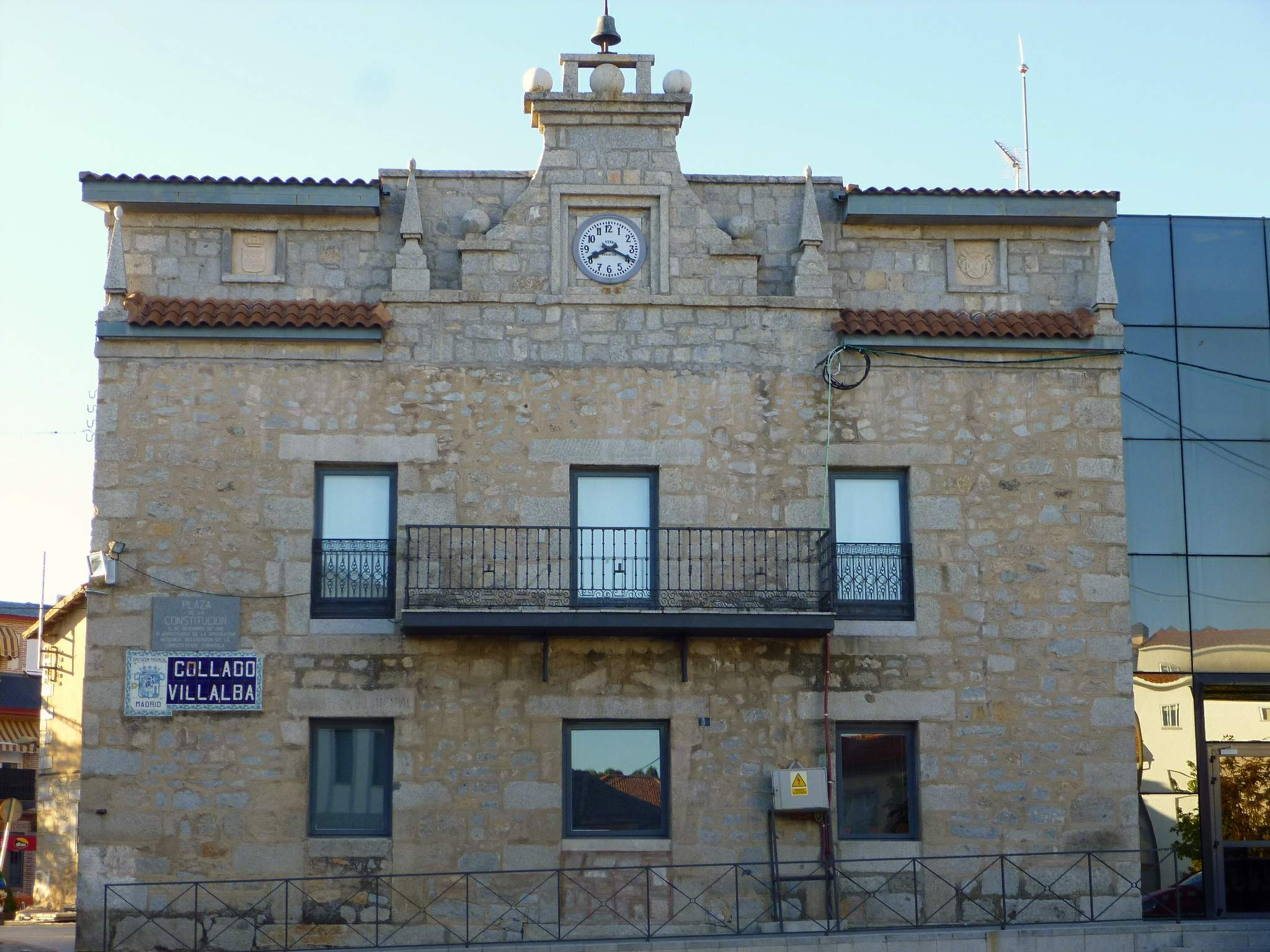
- Town hall

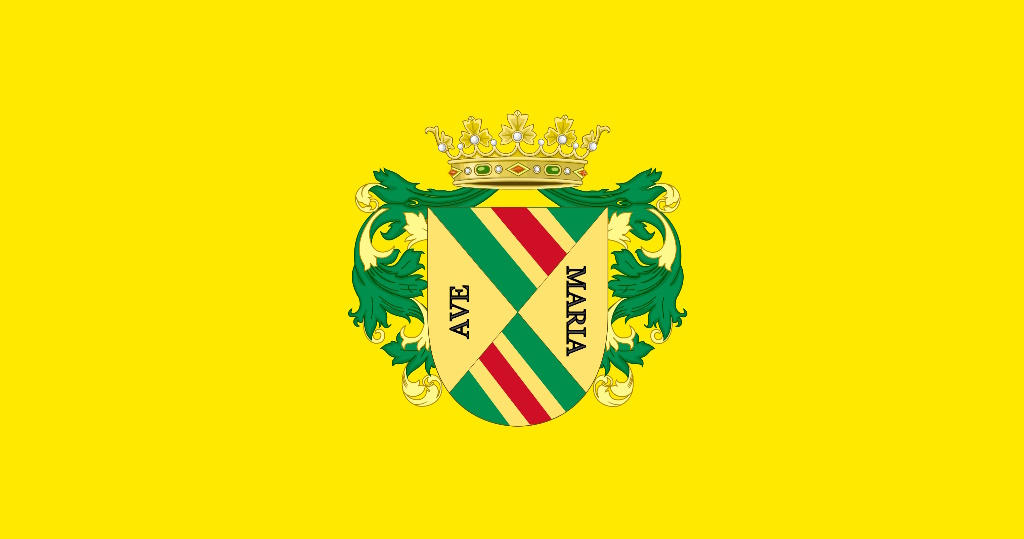
- Flag Coat of arms

- Location in the Community of Madrid, Spain
- Coordinates: 40°38′00″N 4°00′30″W
- Country: Spain
- Autonomous community: Community of Madrid
- Province: Madrid

Government
  - Mayor: Mariola Vargas (Partido Popular)

Area
  - Total: 26.5 km^{2} (10.2 sq mi)
- Elevation: 917 m (3,009 ft)

Population (2025-01-01)
  - Total: 67,274
  - Density: 2,540/km^{2} (6,580/sq mi)
- Demonym: Villalbinos/as
- Time zone: UTC+1 (CET)
  - Summer (DST): UTC+2 (CEST)
- Postal code: 28400
- Area code: 34 (Spain) + 91 (Madrid)
- Website: Official website

Collado Villalba (Spanish pronunciation: [koˈʎaðo βiˈʎalβa]) is a municipality of the Community of Madrid, in central Spain. It is located 40.3 kilometres (25.0 mi) north-west of the city of Madrid, at an altitude of 917 metres (3,009 ft) above sea level. It has a population of 64,263 (2022), with a population density of about 2,400/km^{2} (6,200/sq mi). Collado Villalba has a hot summer Mediterranean climate (Köppen Csa).

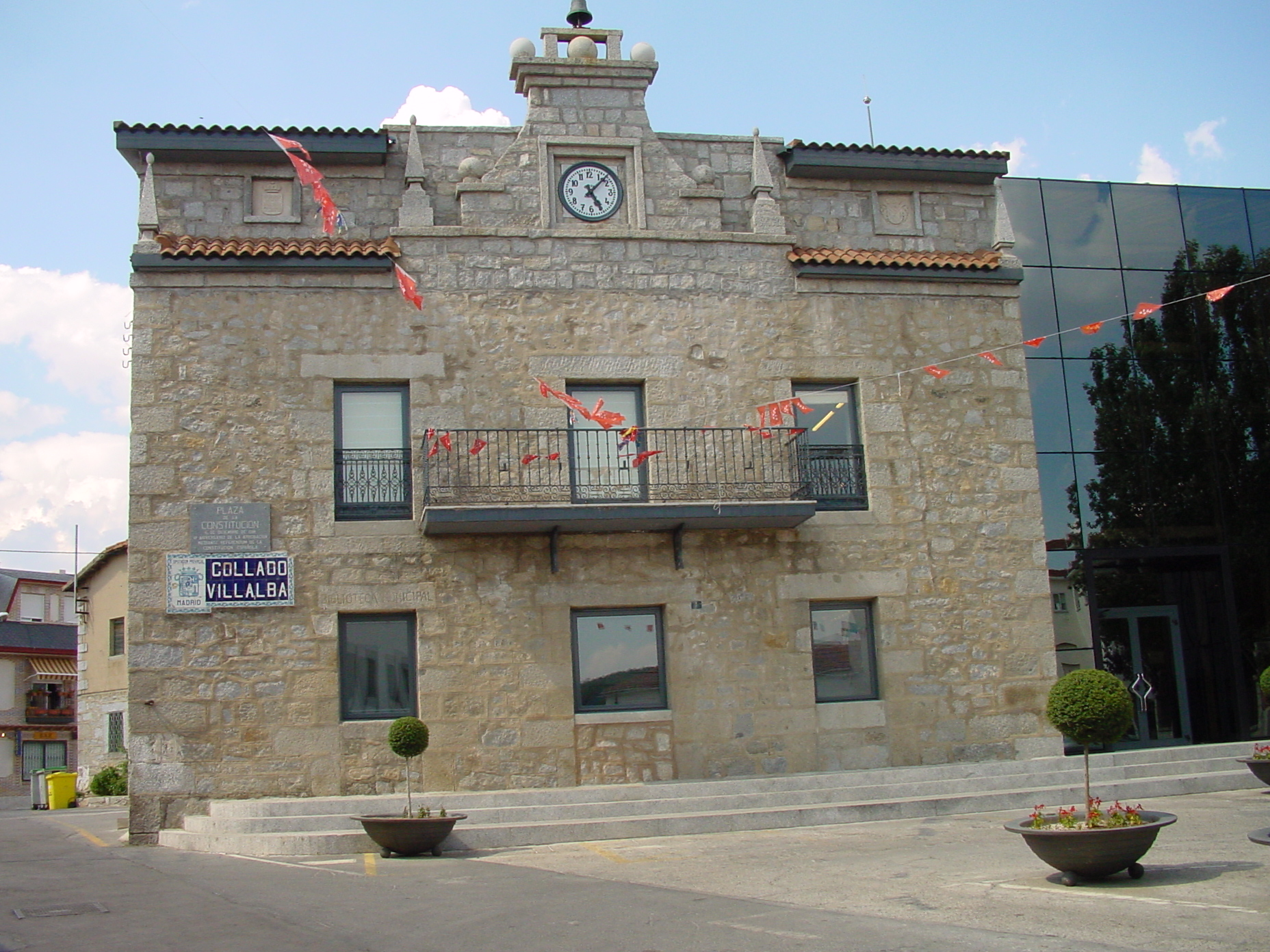
City Council

== Public transport ==
=== Train ===
Collado Villalba has its own train station, which gives service to lines C-3a (Aranjuez - El Escorial - Santa María de la Alameda), C-8 (Guadalajara - Cercedilla) and C-10 (Aeropuerto T-4 - Villalba) of Cercanías Madrid. It also gives service to long distance trains going to Salamanca, Ávila or Valladolid.

=== Bus ===
Collado Villalba has many bus lines, most of them connecting the town with Madrid.

- 630: Villalba - Galapagar - Colmenarejo - Valdemorillo
- 660: San Lorenzo de El Escorial - Guadarrama - Villalba
- 670: Villalba Hospital - Moralzarzal
- 671: Madrid (Moncloa) - Moralzarzal
- 672: Madrid (Moncloa) - Cerceda (through Mataelpino)
- 672a: Madrid (Moncloa) - Cerceda
- 673: Madrid (Moncloa) - Villalba
- 680: Alpedrete - Villalba Hospital
- 681: Madrid (Moncloa) - Alpedrete
- 682: Madrid (Moncloa) - Guadarrama
- 683 Madrid (Moncloa) - Collado Mediano
- 684: Madrid (Moncloa) - Guadarrama - Cercedilla
- 685 Majadahonda - Guadarrama
- 687: Madrid (Moncloa) - Villalba (Bus Station)
- 688: Madrid (Moncloa) - Los Molinos
- 691: Madrid (Moncloa) - Becerril de la Sierra - Navacerrada
- 696: Villalba Hospital - Navacerrada
- 720: Colmenar Viejo - Villalba
- 876: Madrid (Plaza de Castilla) - Moralzarzal - Villalba
- Night bus line 602: Madrid (Moncloa) - Villalba
- Night bus line 603: Madrid (Moncloa) - Moralzarzal
- Urban line 1: Train Station - Parque de La Coruña - City Center - Urbanizaciones
- Urban line 2 (circular): Train Station - Parque de La Coruña - Health Center - Los Negrales - Train Station
- Urban line 3: Train Station - El Gorronal - Villalba Hospital
- Urban line 4: Train Station - Parque de La Coruña - City Center
- Urban line 6: Train Station - Cantos Altos - City Center - Arroyo Arriba

== See also ==
- Los Negrales
- Imperial Route of the Community of Madrid
