= Palace of Canto del Pico =

Emblematic property of cultural interest in Torrelodones, Madrid, Spain

- Palacio del Canto del Pico (Spanish)
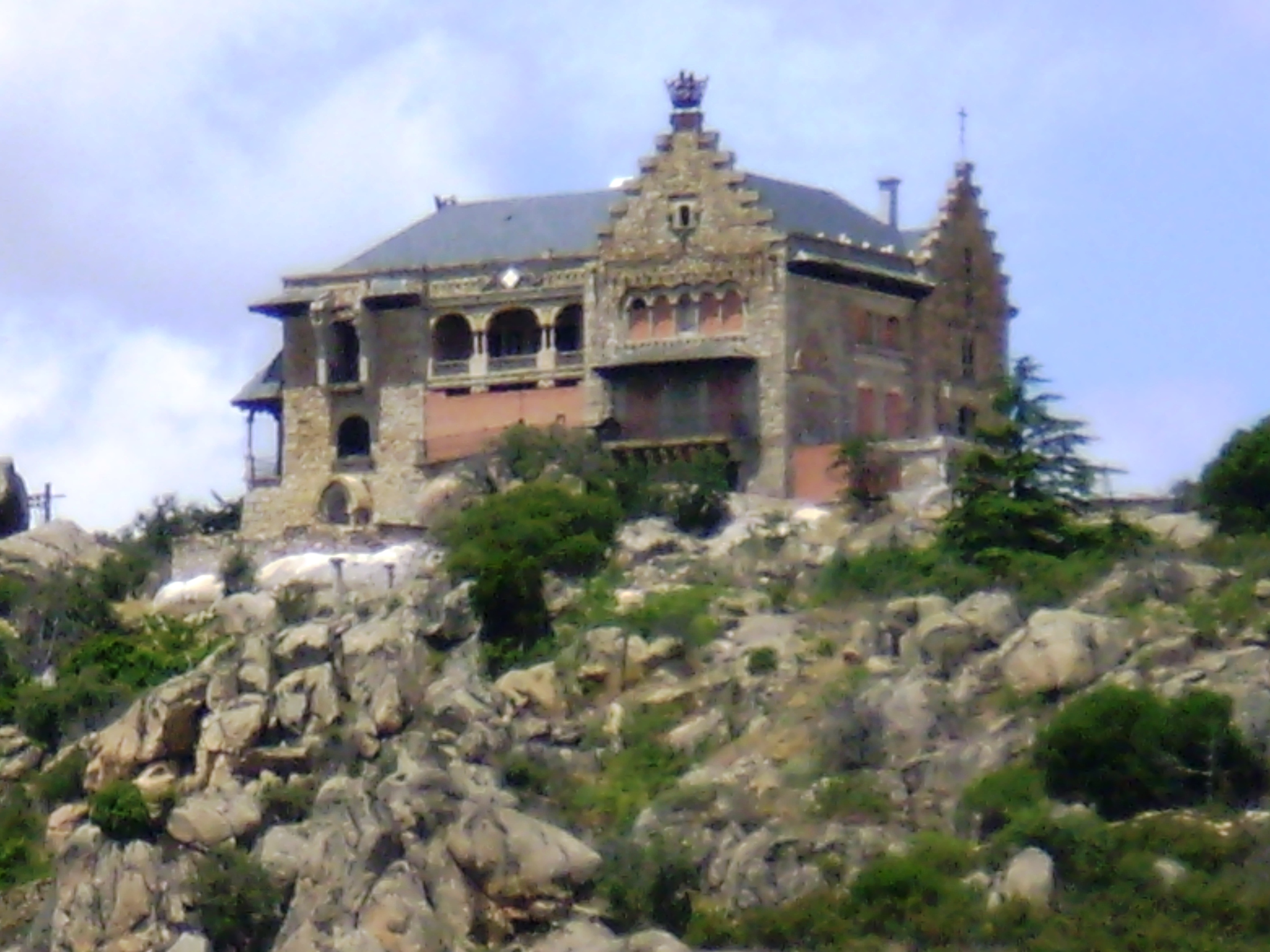

- Location within Spain
- 40.5891°N 3.9255°W
- Location: Torrelodones, Spain

Spanish Cultural Heritage
- Official name: Palacio del Canto del Pico
- Type: Non-movable
- Criteria: Monument
- Designated: 1930
- Reference no.: RI-51-0000343

The Palace of Canto del Pico (Spanish: Palacio del Canto del Pico) is a palace located in Torrelodones, Spain. It was declared private property in 1930.

== Construction and location ==
The palace was built between 1920 and 1922 for Abárzuza, Conde de las Almenas III. It is located on the peak of a granite mountain 1,011 metres above sea level. It covers 100 acres. Parts of it remain carved into the rock, such as stairs and balconies.

== Initial ownership ==
The Count used the palace to store all his treasures. He accumulated these and there are rumours that some many have been stolen from cathedrals. Financial difficulties forced him to sell the treasures for 2 million pesetas to a US buyer The prime minister Antonio Maura died there by falling down a flight of steps.

== Civil War usage ==
It was used as the headquarters for the Republican Army during the Spanish Civil War. Indalecio Prieto and Jose Miaja used it as their base to organise the Battle of Brunete. After the war Franco lived there for many years.

== Recent years ==
The palace has suffered heavily from looting and vandalism over the years, and a fire destroyed many of the remaining artworks in 1998. This led to it receiving a reduced classification in 2004. A hotel company bought it in 1988 intending to convert it into a luxury hotel. Planning permission was refused for the hotel in 2013 due to the building's value as a cultural monument.

== See also ==
- Imperial Route of the Community of Madrid
