= Los Negrales =

Spanish residential zone

Coordinates: 40°38′00″N 4°01′20″W

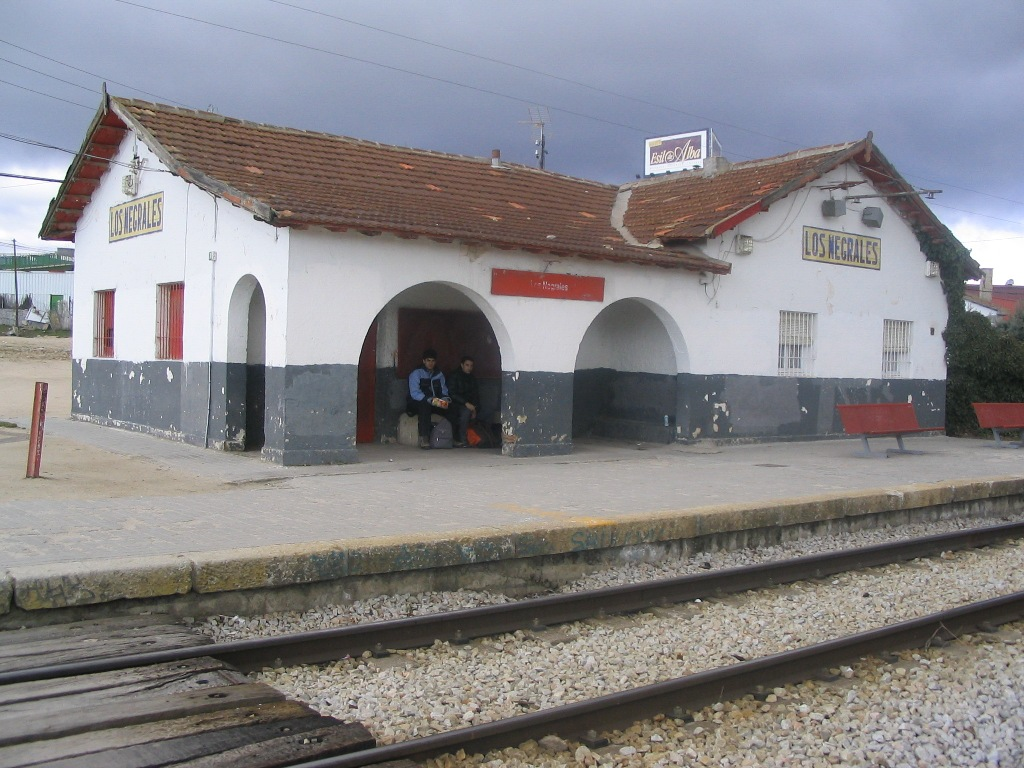
The train station in Los Negrales

Los Negrales is a residential zone in the municipal area of Collado Villalba, Alpedrete, San Lorenzo de El Escorial, Guadarrama and Galapagar (municipalities of the northwest of the Community of Madrid, Spain), consisting mostly of detached houses. Although it was divided in three administrative zones, Los Negrales is a contiguous residential area. This residential zone was built gradually. The oldest houses date to the first half of the 20th century, and building has continued until contemporary times. A significant part of the houses are second residences of their owners, therefore, in summer and in holidays the population doubles.

Los Negrales is situated near the Sierra de Guadarrama and near the centre of Collado Villalba, which makes it a favorable place to spend the holidays. The short distance to Collado Villalba facilitates shopping and leisure.

Los Negrales has considerable public facilities (parish church, public schools, a sports center, a municipal park and a pharmacy, among others). This area is divided in two parts: Los Negrales (neighbourhood) and the Colony Fuentellana (where the station of Los Negrales is located), and both zones are divided by the avenue of Reina Victoria (ancient N-SAW or road of La Coruña).

Los Negrales has public bus service and has a train station of the line C-8b of Cercanías Madrid called Los Negrales, situated in the municipality of Alpedrete. The motorway Autopista del Noroeste passes north of Los Negrales, as does the highway Carretera Nacional N-VI. Another main road, M-510, runs along the western side of Los Negrales, and the junction of the three roads is located in the north-west of the area.

The name of Los Negrales is based upon a nearby forest of black pine (pino negral in Spanish). Its patron saint is Our Lady of Mount Carmel, on whose feast day (16 July) a procession is held. Los Negrales is home to an Augustine college, a Theresian institution, a community of the Claretians, and a hall of Jehovah's Witnesses.
