= Sierra de la Cabrera (Sistema Central) =

Mountain range in Spain

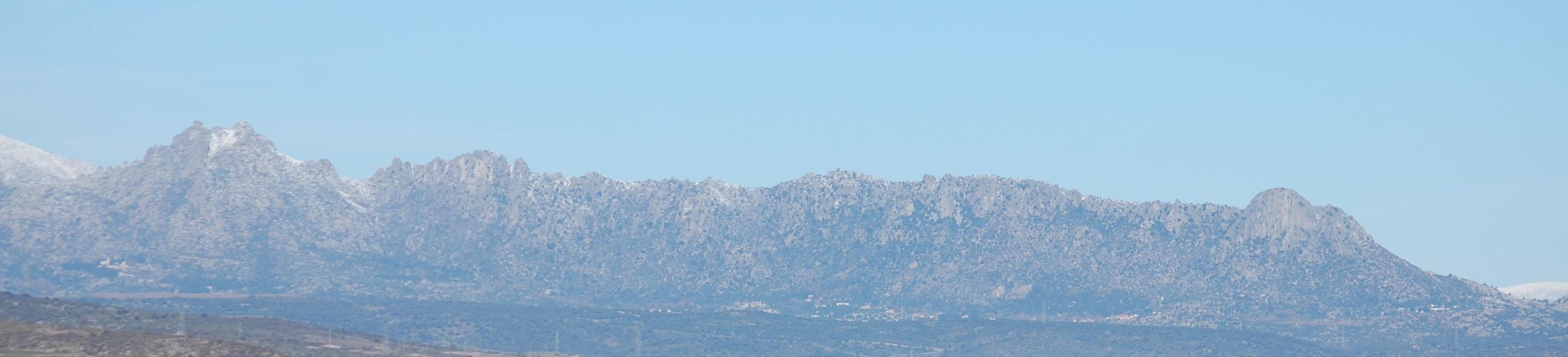

Highest point
- Elevation: 1,564 m (5,131 ft)
- Coordinates: 40.8781°N 3.6294°W

Geography
- Location: Iberian Peninsula, Spain
- Parent range: Sistema Central

The Sierra de La Cabrera is a mountain range near Madrid, Spain. It is a subrange of the Sierra de Guadarrama.

== See also ==
- La Cabrera
