= Alpedrete =

- Municipality
- Flag Coat of arms

- Location in Spain
- Coordinates: 40°39′30″N 4°1′56″W
- Country: Spain
- Autonomous community: Madrid
- Province: Madrid
- Comarca: Sierra de Guadarrama

Area
  - Total: 12.64 km^{2} (4.88 sq mi)
- Elevation: 919 m (3,015 ft)

Population (2025-01-01)
  - Total: 15,686
  - Density: 1,241/km^{2} (3,214/sq mi)
- Demonyms: alpedreteño ,ña.
- Time zone: UTC+1 (CET)
  - Summer (DST): UTC+2 (CEST)
- Postal code: 28430
- Climate: Csa
- Website: Official website

Alpedrete (Spanish pronunciation: [alpeˈðɾete]) is a town and municipality in central Spain. It is located in the Sierra de Guadarrama in the autonomous community of the Community of Madrid. It had a population of 15,006 inhabitants in 2022 (INE, 2022).

== Politics ==
Party	Votes	%	+/-	Seats	+/-
PP	3,013	37.51	7.95	7	3
Vox	1,176	14.64	▲3.5	3	▲1
Unión del Pueblo de Alpedrete	1,149	14.30	▲0.56	2	0
PSOE	844	10.50	▼5.42	6	▼1
Más Madrid/Verdes Equo Alpedrete	783	9.74	New	2	New
Podemos/IU/AV	778	9.68	2.82	1	0
Ciudadanos	152	1.89	▼11.86	0	▼3
No overall control, PP minority					

== See also ==
- Los Negrales
