= Torrelodones =

- Municipality
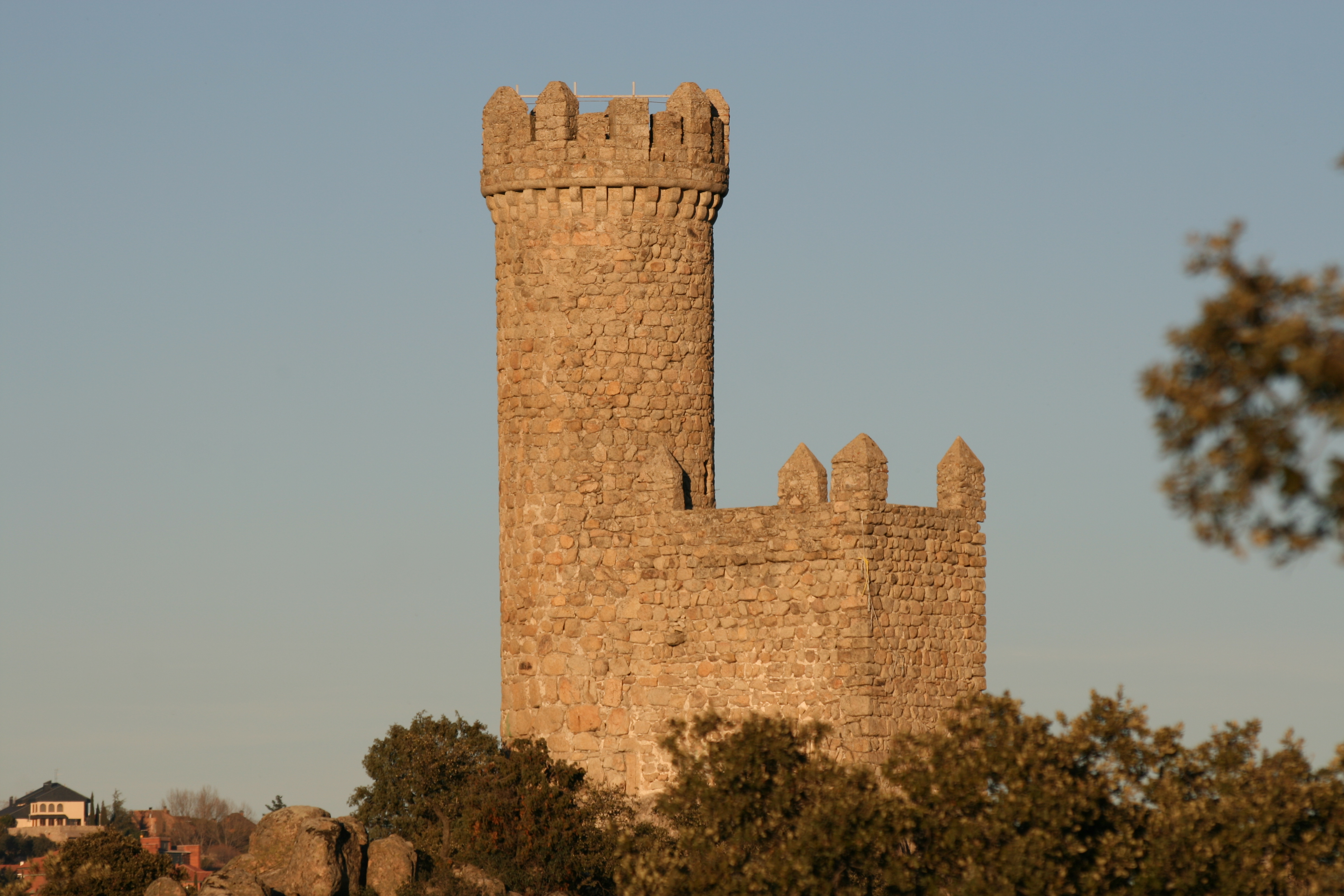
- Watchtower of Torrelodones, gives the name to the municipality

- Flag Coat of arms
- Nickname: Torre
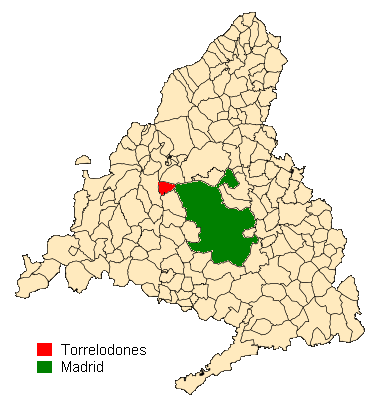
- Location in the Community of Madrid, Spain

- Location within Community of Madrid Location within Spain
- Coordinates (Town Hall): 40°34′32″N 3°55′45″W
- Country: Spain
- Autonomous community: Community of Madrid
- Province: Madrid
- Comarcas: Madrid metropolitan area Comarca agrícola de Guadarrama
- Administrative Divisions: 3
- Founded: c. VII century
- Population nuclei: Pueblo, Colonia, Los Peñascales

Government
  - Alcaldesa: Almudena Negro (PP)

Area
  - Total: 21.95 km^{2} (8.47 sq mi)
- Elevation: 845 m (2,772 ft)
- Highest elevation: 1,011 m (3,317 ft)
- Lowest elevation: 675 m (2,215 ft)

Population (2025-01-01)
  - Total: 25,433
  - Density: 1,053.67/km^{2} (2,729.0/sq mi)
- Time zone: UTC+01:00 (CET)
  - Summer (DST): UTC+02:00 (CEST)
- Postal code: 28250
- Area codes: +34 (Spain) + 91 (Madrid)
- Website: torrelodones.es

Torrelodones is a municipality in the northwest of the Autonomous Community of Madrid, Spain. It is situated 29 kilometers northwest from the city of Madrid. Because of its location between the Sierra de Guadarrama and the metropolitan area of the capital, it is linked to two districts in Madrid: the agricultural area of Guadarrama and the metropolitan area of Madrid.

It lies at an average altitude of 845 meters. According to the 2022 census, 24,775 people live in the municipality, distributed among seven towns.

The people of Torrelodones earn among the highest per capita incomes of the Community of Madrid. Services, hotels, and construction are the main economic activities. In 2012 it had about 22,680 inhabitants. With over three colleges and four developments, Torrelodones is usually divided into two parts: Torrelodones town, where there is the Town Hall, and the Torrelodones colony, where there are schools, homes and small businesses.

The town has an interesting artistic and natural heritage and is part of two tourist routes in the Community of Madrid. One of them is the Imperial Route, which partially follows the historic route used in the 16th century by King Philip II in his travels from the city of Madrid to the Royal Site of El Escorial. The other is the Route through the Castles, Fortresses and Watchtowers, to which it is linked by the Watchtower of Torrelodones.

Torrelodones is bordered to the north by Hoyo de Manzanares, to the south by Las Rozas de Madrid, to the west by Galapagar, and to the east by Madrid (through El Monte de El Pardo).

Historically the municipality was named Torrelodones (Lodones' Tower). That name led to the current name of the town of Torrelodones. One source for the name comes from that of the Muslim watchtower that Muslims used during the Al-andalus era to guard the city from the attacks of Christian people during the Iberian peninsula's reconquest. Another namesake, lodon (hack berry), is a type of tree that was abundant in the area, whose scientific name is Celtis australis.

== Symbols ==
The town's badge, or coat of arms, was approved in 1979 by the Real Decreto 3086/1979, of December 14. Its official description in Spanish is:

EscudoPartido, primero, de plata. la torre de azur; se• gundü, de azur, la banda de oro, engolada en dragantes del mismo metal y en punta, de plata, el almez o lodón frutado de sable. Al timbre, corona real cerrada.

This literally translates as: "Badge divided, first, of silver, the tower on azure, second, in azure, the gold band, with dragon heads of the same metal, and in peak, of silver, the hack berry of saber. On the top, a royal crown closed."

The town's flag was approved by Madrid's community on 12 February 1992, and was designed by Julian Nieto Martin. The flag's description is:

"Rectangular flag, of 2:3 ratio divided diagonally in 2 equal portions from the right top corner to the bottom left corner, blue on the top and yellow on the bottom; in the middle the officially approved coat of arms."

== Urban geography ==
=== Boundaries ===
Torrelodones is bounded by the following:

- To the north by the municipality of Hoyo de Manzanares through La Berzosa and some paths and roads that belong to the Parque Regional de la Cuenca Alta del Manzanares.
- To the south by Las Rozas de Madrid through Las Matas, Los Peñascales and the neighborhood of Molino de la Hoz.
- To the west by the municipality of Galapagar through several neighborhoods involved in Parque Regional del Curso Medio del río Guadarrama y su entorno. Both municipalities are separated by the Guadarrama river.
- To the east by the city of Madrid through the Monte de El Pardo.

=== Towns ===
Torrelodones' population is spread over seven officially recognized towns: Torrelodones (center), Los Robles, Los Peñascales, Los Bomberos, La Estacion, La Berzosilla, El Gasco. There are other neighborhoods isolated apart from those seven towns, but they are not officially recognized.

Towns	Coordinates	Population (2009)		
Torrelodones (center)	40°34′35″N 3°55′46″O	8272		
Los Robles	40°35′7″N 3°55′14″O	1292		
Los Peñascales	40°34′19″N 3°53′52″O	4218		
Los Bomberos	40°34′12″N 3°55′35″O	1262		
La Estación	40°34′36″N 3°56′58″O	5336		
La Berzosilla	40°35′12″N 3°56′51″O	528		
El Gasco	40°34′3″N 3°56′44″O	323	Total	21231

=== Urban habitat ===
Torrelodones is divided into two parts: Torrelodones-pueblo (Torrelodones town), and Torrelodones-colonia (Torrelodones colony).

Torrelodones-pueblo has the historical part of the municipality. It was developed in the early Middle Ages around a street that still exists today, called Calle Real (Royal Street). Through the 20th century the town started to expand with the construction of new buildings, new business and small stores.

In the late 19th century the Torrelodones-colonia part arose around the railway station; it is still developing. It consisted of small townhouses, apartments and villas.

Both the Torrelodones-pueblo and the Torrelodones-colonia are the main social, administrative and economic centers of the municipality. They contain 64% of the population and the vast majority of businesses, industries and services available in the village.

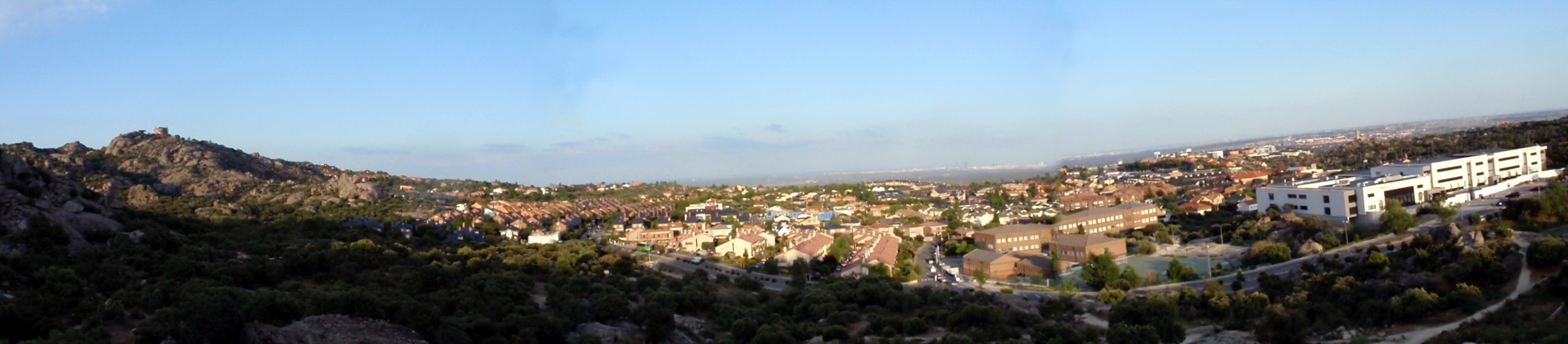
Panoramic view of Torrelodones town

== Climate ==
Torrelodones's weather is continental Mediterranean. It has cold winters with temperatures less than 5 °C, frequent frost at night and occasional snow. Summers are warm, around 25 °C, and with maximum temperatures that can reach over 35 °C. The annual rainfall is more than 400mm.

Torrelodones' average climatic parameters in the period 1961–2003
Month	Jan	Feb	Mar	Apr	May	Jun	Jul	Aug	Sep	Oct	Nov	Dic	Annual
Total rainfall (mm)	57.8	46.7	34.8	51.1	51.8	30.1	10.8	10.7	33.6	56.0	80.1	60.0	523.6

== Flora ==
The municipality has much Mediterranean flora that is typical of Spain.

Trees there mainly are holm oaks, with the occasional presence of junipers, oaks and pine trees, and spontaneous pine reforestation.

== Wildlife ==
Torrelodones joins two protected ecological spaces: Sierra de Hoyo and Monte del Pardo.

Animals that live here include birds, mammals, reptiles, amphibians and invertebrates. All of them are included in the Catálogo Nacional de Especies Amenazadas and the Catálogo Regional de Especies Amenazadas de Fauna y Flora de la Comunidad de Madrid.

=== Birds ===
Águila imperial ibérica (Aquila adalberti) (Spanish imperial eagle) is the most important bird in the area.

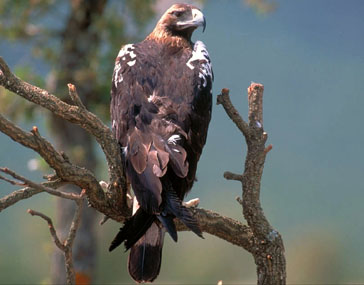
Spanish Imperial Eagle.

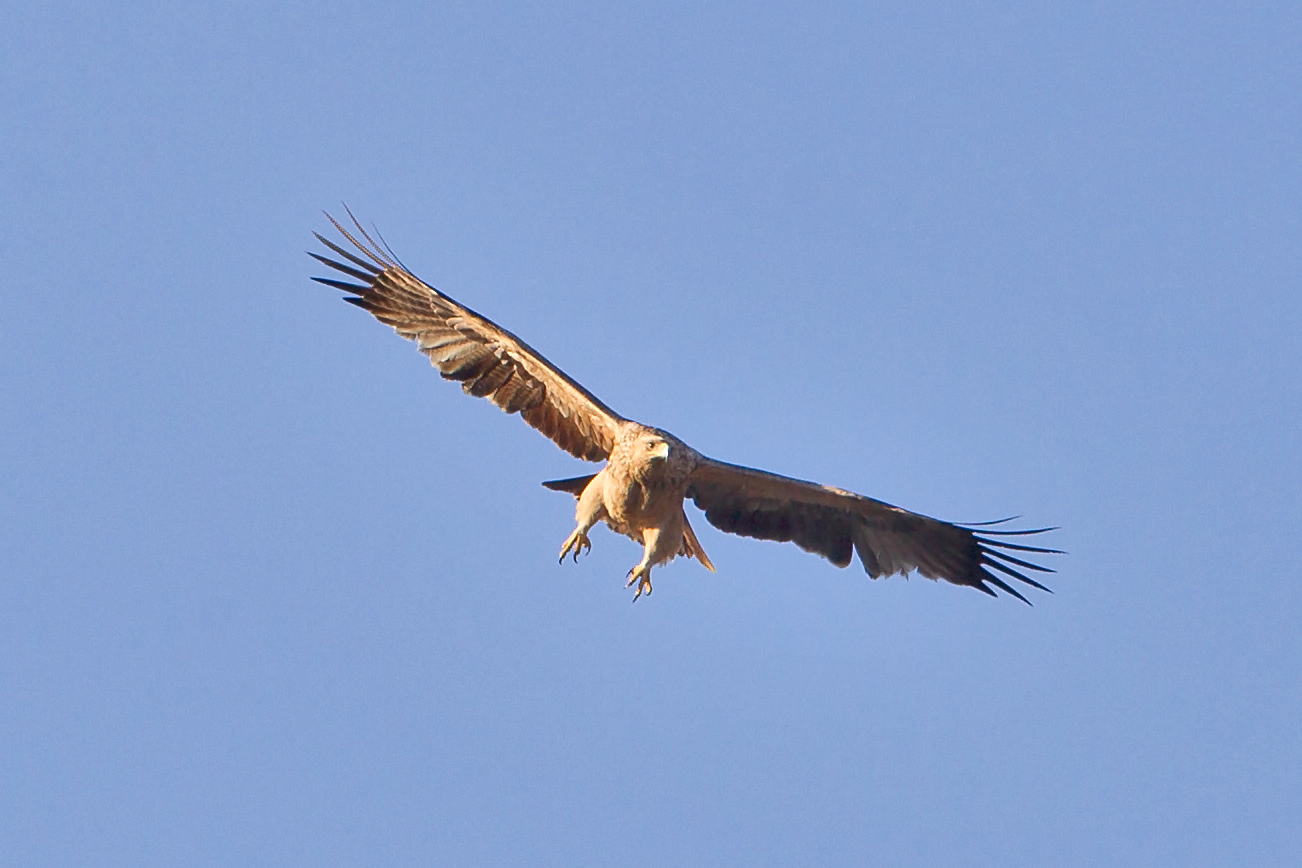

Other birds include Picogordo (Coccothraustes coccothraustes), curruca mosquitera (Sylvia borin), curruca zarcera (Sylvia communis), curruca mirlona (Sylvia hortensis), papamoscas gris (Muscicapa striata), oropéndola (Oriolus oriolus), collalba rubia (Oenanthe hispanica), chochín (Troglodytes troglodytes), pito real (Picus viridis), mochuelo (Athene noctua), autillo (Otus scops), abubilla (Upupa epops), carbonero común (Parus major), alcaudón real (Lanius meridionalis), alcaudón común (Lanius senator), abejaruco (Merops apiaster), estornino (Sturnus unicolor), rabilargo (Cyanopica cooki), El petirrojo (Erithacus rubecula), el ruiseñor (Luscinia megarhynchos), el mirlo (Turdus merula), el verdecillo (Serinus serinus), el verderón (Carduelis chloris), el pardillo (Carduelis cannabina), and el zorzal (Turdus spp.).

There are also some species for hunting, such as la perdiz (Alectoris rufa), la codorniz (Coturnix coturnix), la tórtola (Streptopelia turtur) and la paloma torcaz (Columba palumbus).

Among the raptor birds are aguilucho ratonero (Buteo buteo) and al elanio azul (Elanus caeruleus).

=== Mammals ===
The municipality shelters, especially in protected zones, ardilla roja (Sciurus vulgaris), erizo europeo (Erinaceus europaeus), conejo (Oryctolagus cuniculus), liebre ibérica (Lepus granatensis), comadreja (Mustela nivalis), gineta (Genetta genetta), zorro (Vulpes vulpes), jabalí (Sus scrofa), el ratón de campo (Apodemus sylvaticus), el ratón casero (Mus domesticus), el lirón careto (Eliomys quercinus), la musaraña gris (Crocidura russula), el topo ibérico (Talpa occidentalis), and topillo de Cabrera (Microtus cabrerae).

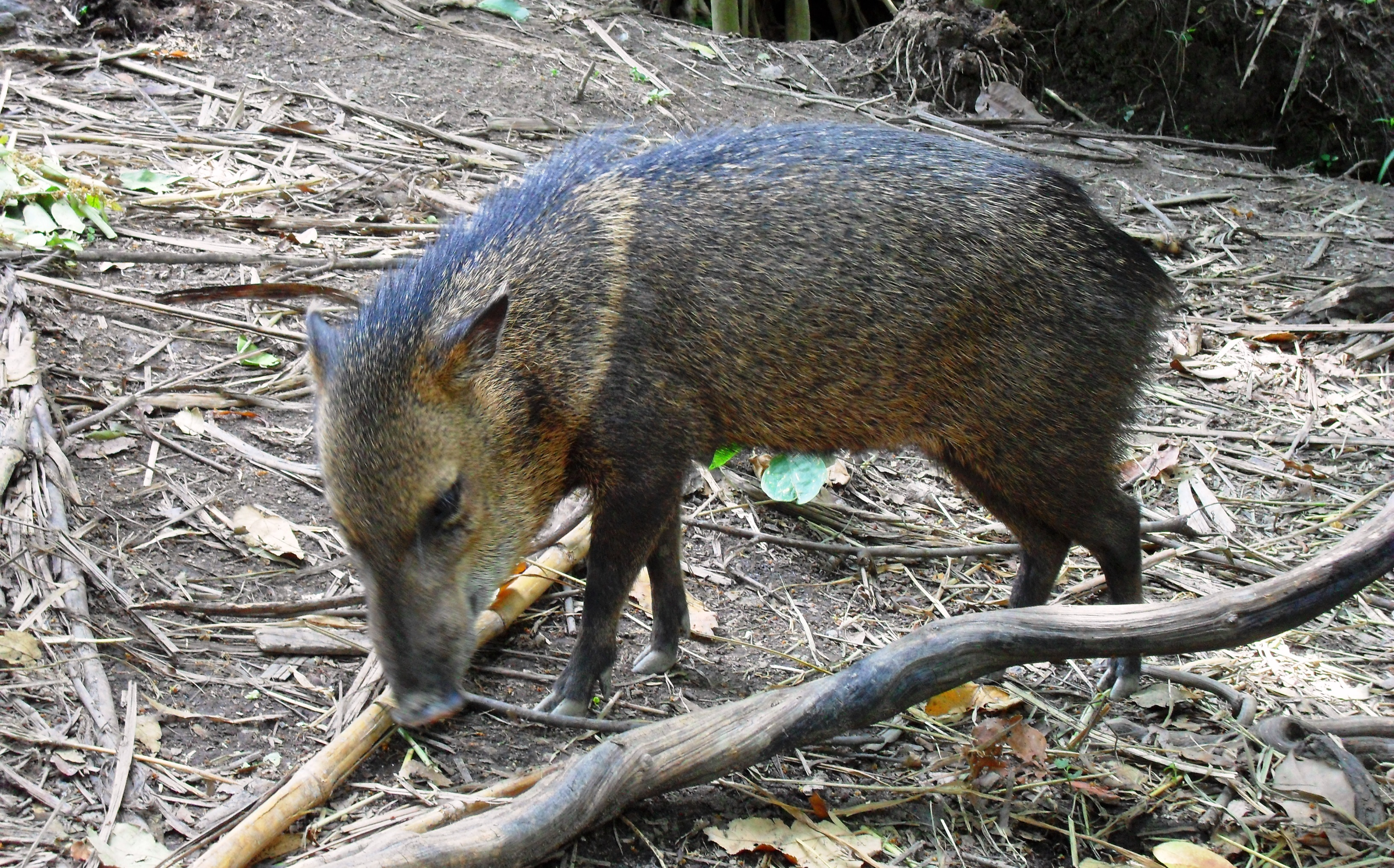
Jabalí

=== Reptiles and amphibians ===
Torrelodones is home to reptiles such as la lagartija colirroja (Psammodromus algirus), la lagartija cenicienta (Psammodromus hispanicus), la lagartija ibérica (Podarcis hispanicus), el lagarto ocelado (Lacerta lepida), la salamanquesa común (Tarentola mauritanica), la culebrilla ciega (Amphisbaenia), la culebra de collar (Natrix natrix), la culebra viperina (Natrix maura) and la culebra de escalera (Elaphe scalaris).

Among the amphibians are el sapo corredor (Bufo calamita), el sapo de espuelas (Pelobates cultipes), el sapo partero ibérico (Alytes cisternasii), el sapillo pintojo ibérico (Discoglossus galganoi), and el gallipato (Pleurodeles waltl).

=== Invertebrates ===
There are countless species of invertebrates. On record are two species of endangered Lepidoptera: el arlequín (Zerynthia rumina) and la doncella de ondas (Euphydryas aurinia).

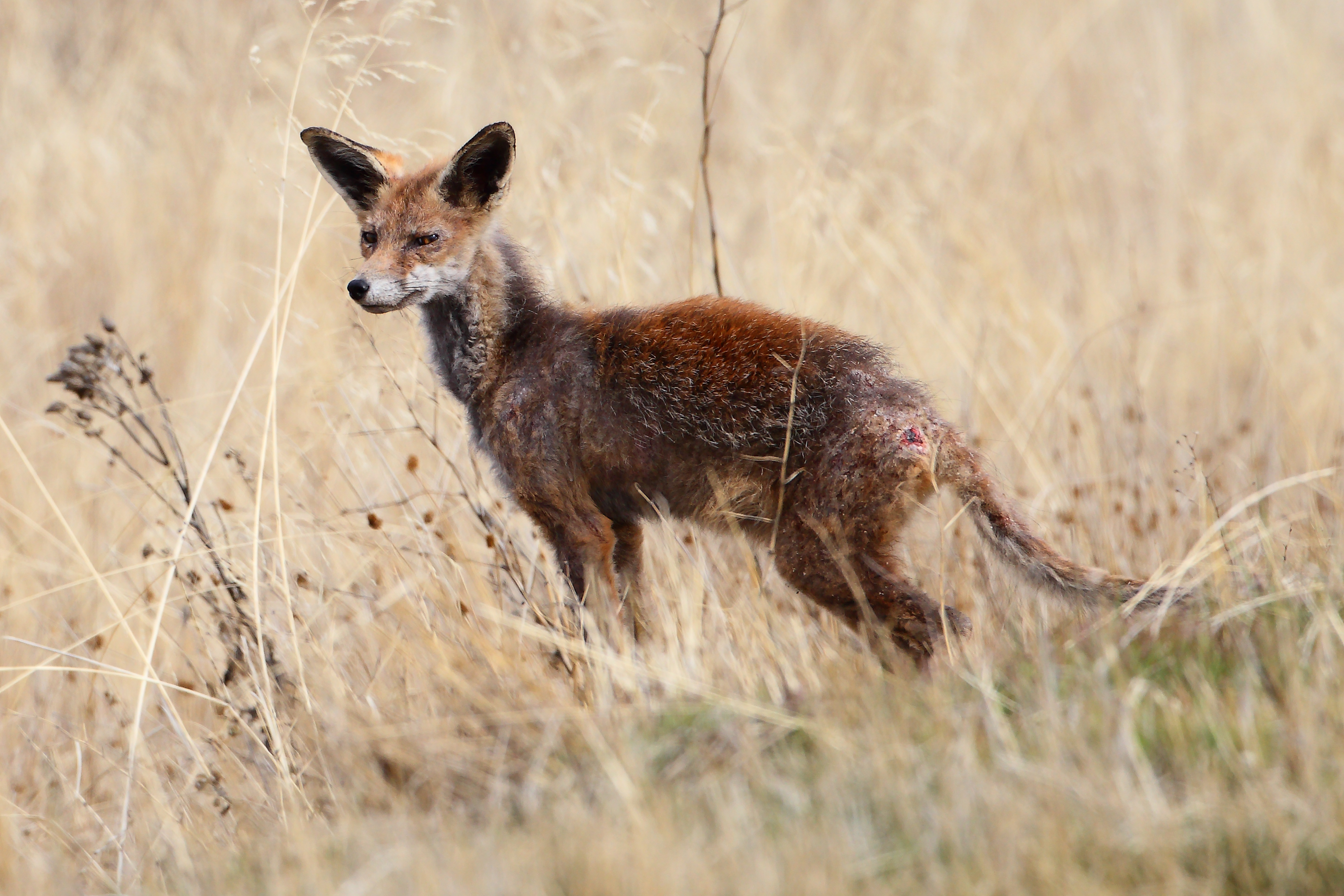
Zorro (red fox)

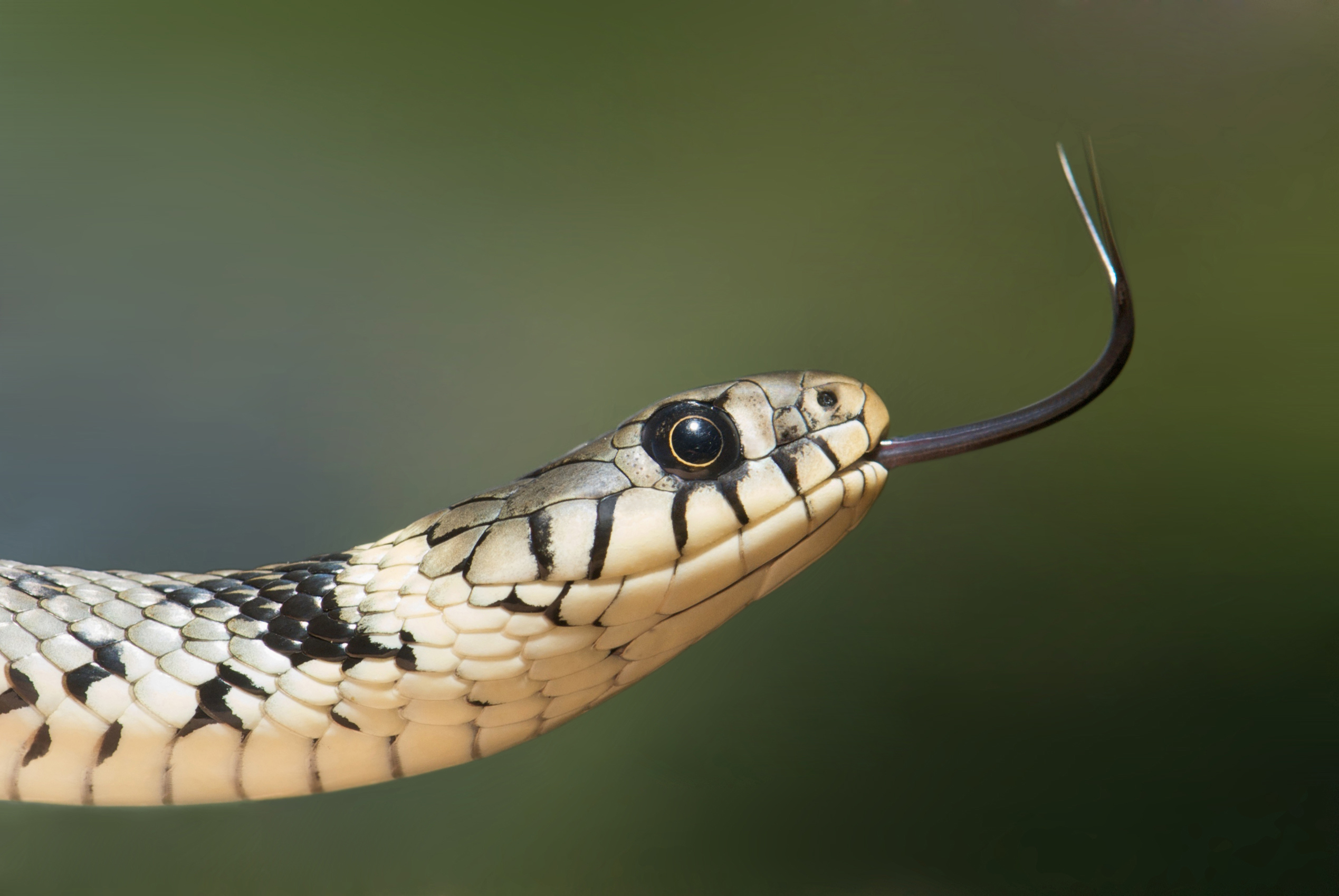
La culebra de collar

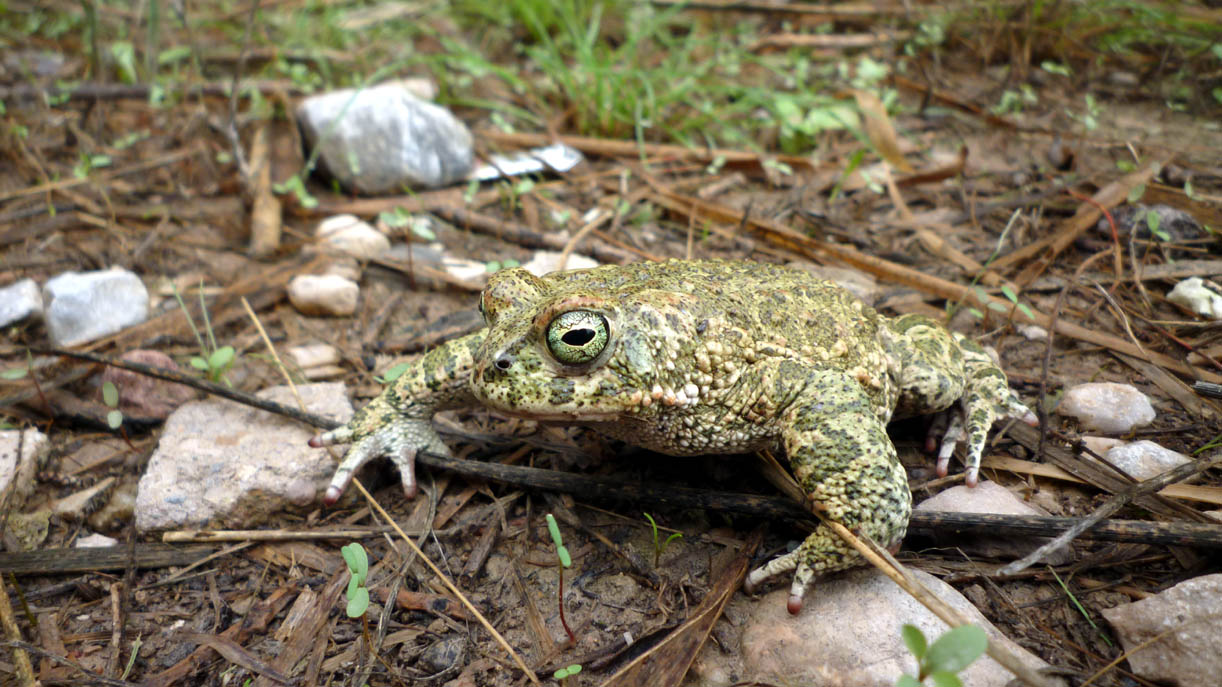
El sapo corredor

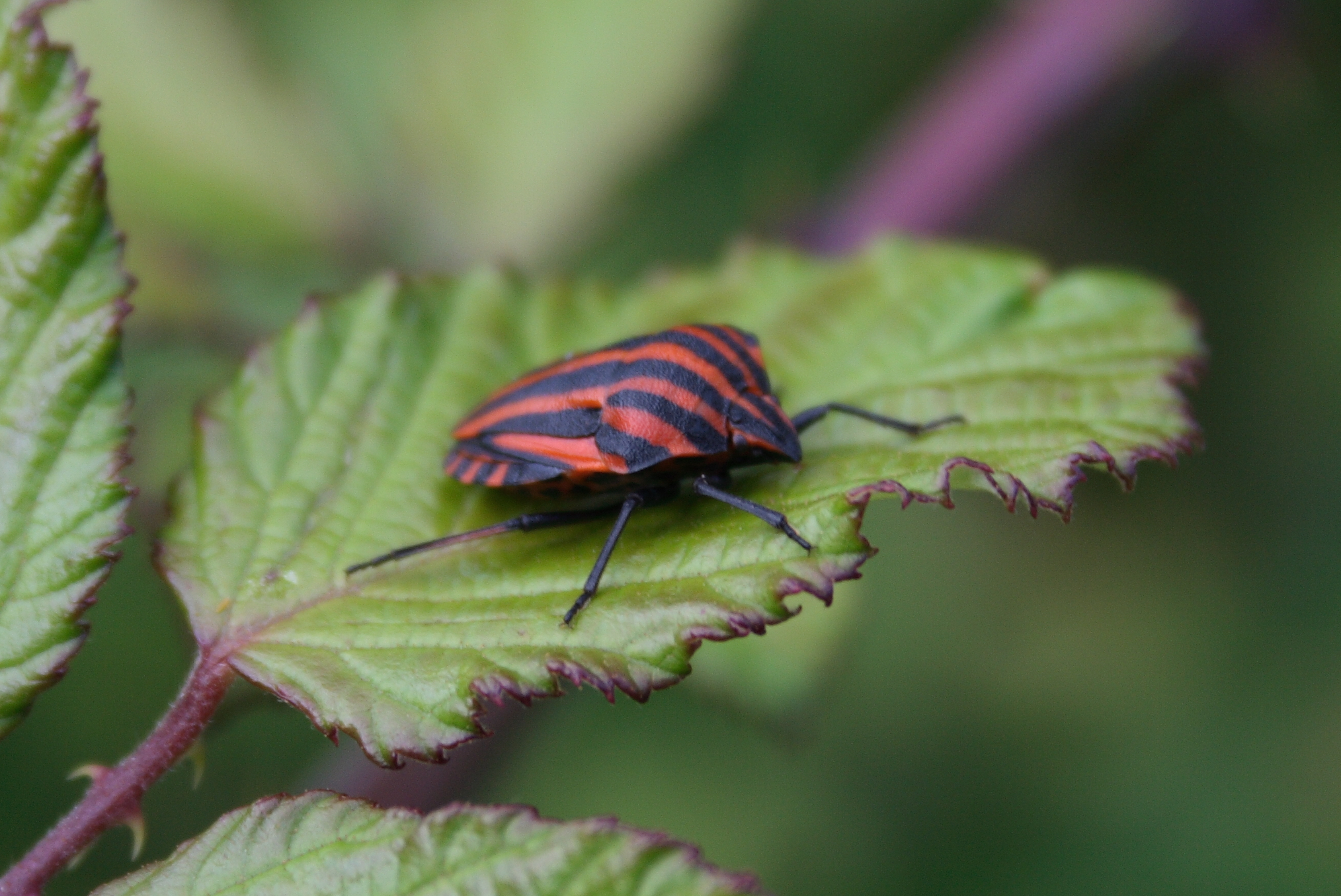
El Arlequin
