= Watchtower of Torrelodones =

Cultural property in Torrelodones, Spain

- Atalaya de Torrelodones (Spanish)
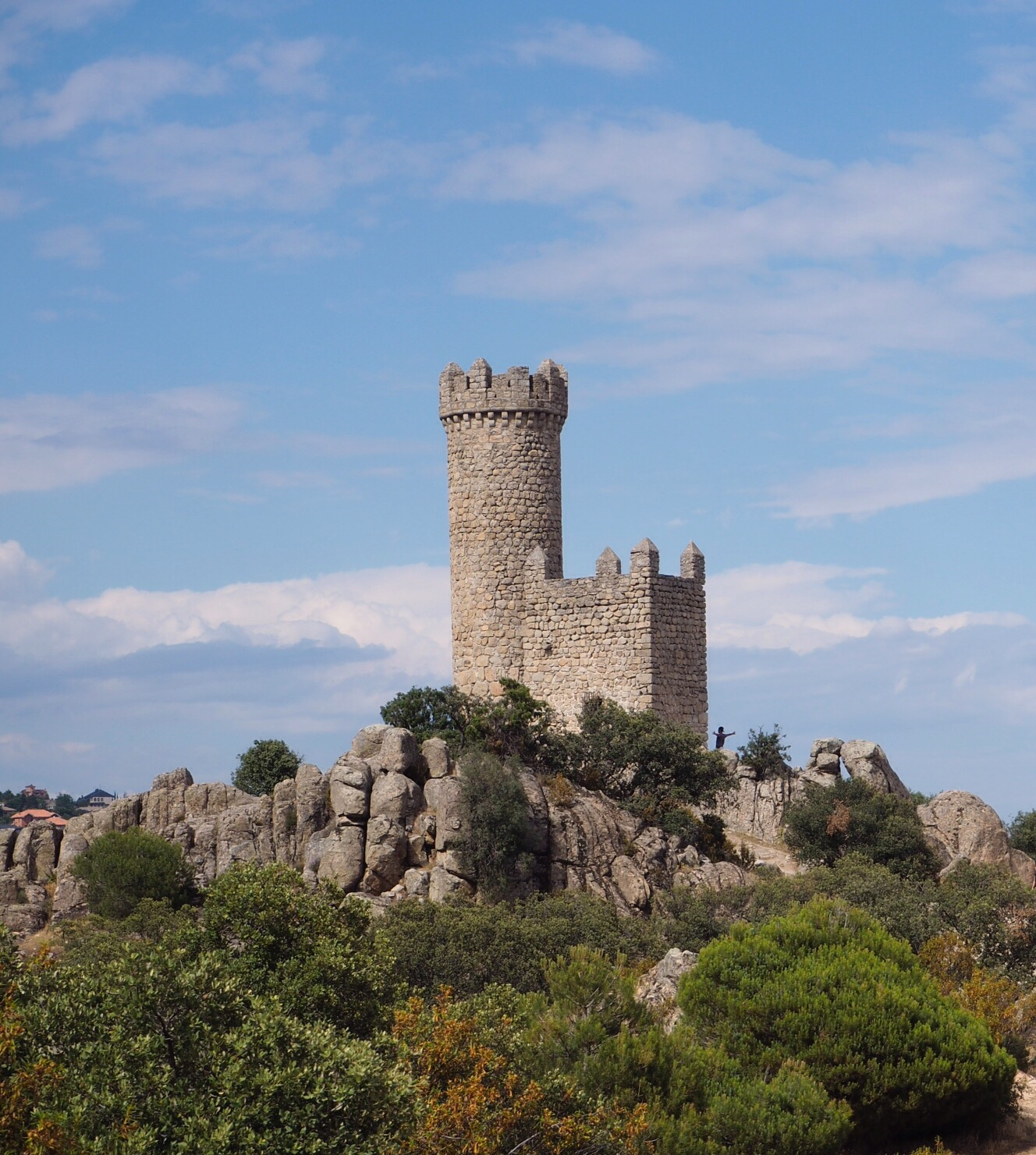

- Location within Spain
- 40.573877°N 3.932473°W
- Location: Torrelodones, Spain

Spanish Cultural Heritage
- Official name: Atalaya de Torrelodones
- Type: Non-movable
- Criteria: Monument
- Designated: 1983
- Reference no.: RI-51-0004938

The Watchtower of Torrelodones (Spanish: Atalaya de Torrelodones) is an Islamic-era construction located in the Spanish municipality of Torrelodones, Community of Madrid, Spain. It was erected at some point during the Umayyad period of Al-Andalus, between the ninth and eleventh centuries. The tower, which has the status of Asset of Cultural Interest, is one of the best preserved Islamic watchtowers in the Madrid region. The current construction shows several alterations, the result of restoration work undertaken in 1928, after the partial collapse of its walls. It was declared Bien de Interés Cultural in 1983.

== Etymology ==
The watchtower takes its name from the Honeyberry, a tree that was widespread in its surroundings. By extension, the hamlet nearby ended up being called Torrelodones. The tower became the symbol of the settlement, which incorporated it into its coat of arms.
