= Guadarrama =

Guadarrama: Guadarrama (Spanish)
- Municipality
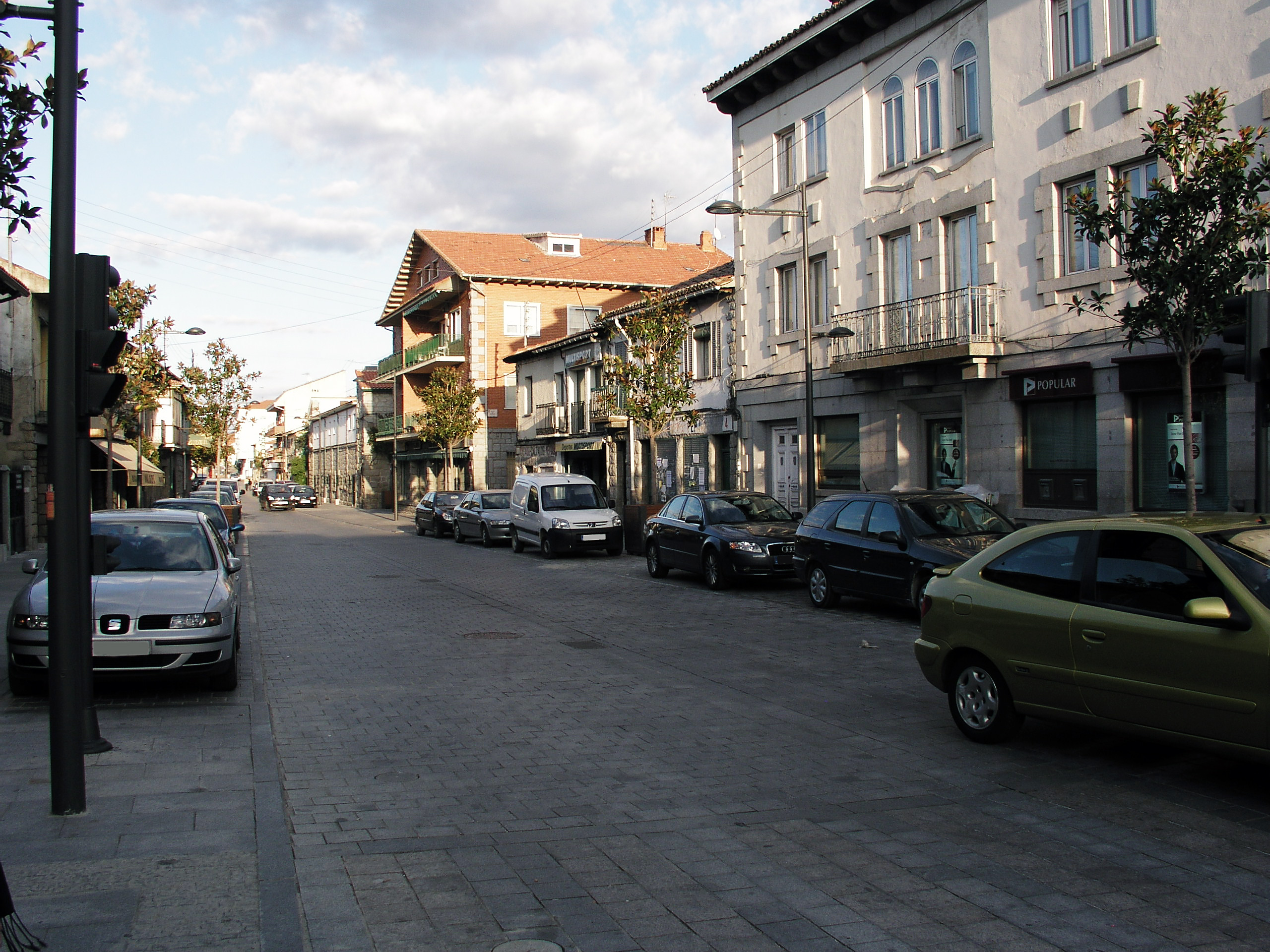
- Street view of Guadarrama

- Flag Coat of arms

- Location within Spain Location within Community of Madrid
- Coordinates: 40°40′22″N 4°05′20″W
- Country: Spain
- Autonomous Community: Community of Madrid
- Comarca: Cuenca del Guadarrama
- Municipality: Guadarrama

Government
  - Mayor: Diosdado Soto Pérez (People's Party)

Area
  - Total: 56.98 km^{2} (22.00 sq mi)
- Elevation: 981 m (3,219 ft)

Population (2023)
  - Total: 17,063
  - Density: 299.5/km^{2} (775.6/sq mi)
- Demonym(s): guadarrameño, -ña
- Website: Guadarrama's Town Council

Guadarrama is a town and municipality in the Cuenca del Guadarrama comarca, in the Community of Madrid, Spain.

Its population is 17,063 according to the Continuous Register of 2023; the population swells to approximately 60,000 in summer. In the 2023 Spanish general election, for the Congress of Spain the residents voted 41.29% for the People's Party, 24.54% for the Spanish Socialist Workers' Party, and 19.45% voted for Vox.

Its name comes from Arabic Wadi-l-ramla river (the sandy river).

Guadarrama achieved the status of "villa" under Fernando V of Castile (II of Aragon) on November 22, 1504. Fernando VI ordered the building of a road to A Coruña through the Guadarrama Pass, through which passed the Grande Armée with Napoleon searching for John Moore's Army in 1808.

This town was absolutely destroyed during the Spanish Civil War, as it was for almost three years a battlefront. All one can see in this town today is new, built in the mid-20th century.

It was the location for some scenes in the 1964 film The Fall of the Roman Empire.

It is close to Sierra de Guadarrama, a mountain range that is visited by Madrid residents seeking cooler temperatures, especially in summer.

== See also ==
- Los Negrales
