= Hoyo de Manzanares =

- municipality
- Flag Coat of arms
- Interactive map of Hoyo de Manzanares
- Coordinates: 40°38′N 3°53′W
- Country: Spain
- Autonomous community: Madrid

Government
  - Body: Ayuntamiento de Hoyo de Manzanares
  - Mayor: Julián Carrasco (PSOE)

Area
  - Total: 45.18 km^{2} (17.44 sq mi)
- Elevation: 1,001 m (3,284 ft)

Population (2025-01-01)
  - Total: 9,310
  - Rank: 1st
  - Density: 206/km^{2} (534/sq mi)
- Demonym: Hoyense
- Time zone: UTC+1 (CET)
  - Summer (DST): UTC+2 (CEST)
- Postal code: 28240
- Website: http://www.hoyodemanzanares.es/

Hoyo de Manzanares is a municipality of the Community of Madrid, Spain, and is located on the northwestern side of the Community of Madrid and to the south of the Sierra de Guadarrama.

It has a stable population of roughly 7,457 residents (INE 2008), a statistic that has been increasing consistently from the economic crisis of 2008/9 onwards. The population also greatly increases during the summer due to an influx of various families who own summer houses in the area.

This district of Madrid is found inside the Cuenca Alta del Manzanares Regional Park created by the Community of Madrid in 1985. This regional park is the oldest and most protected regional park in the Community of Madrid. As a result, Hoyo de Manzanares is surrounded by mountains and fields that give the town a beautiful location.

The only way to arrive in Hoyo de Manzanares from the city of Madrid is via the M-618 highway, which bisects the regional park, passing the nearby towns of Torrelodones, Colmenar Viejo, and finally Hoyo de Manzanares.

== History ==
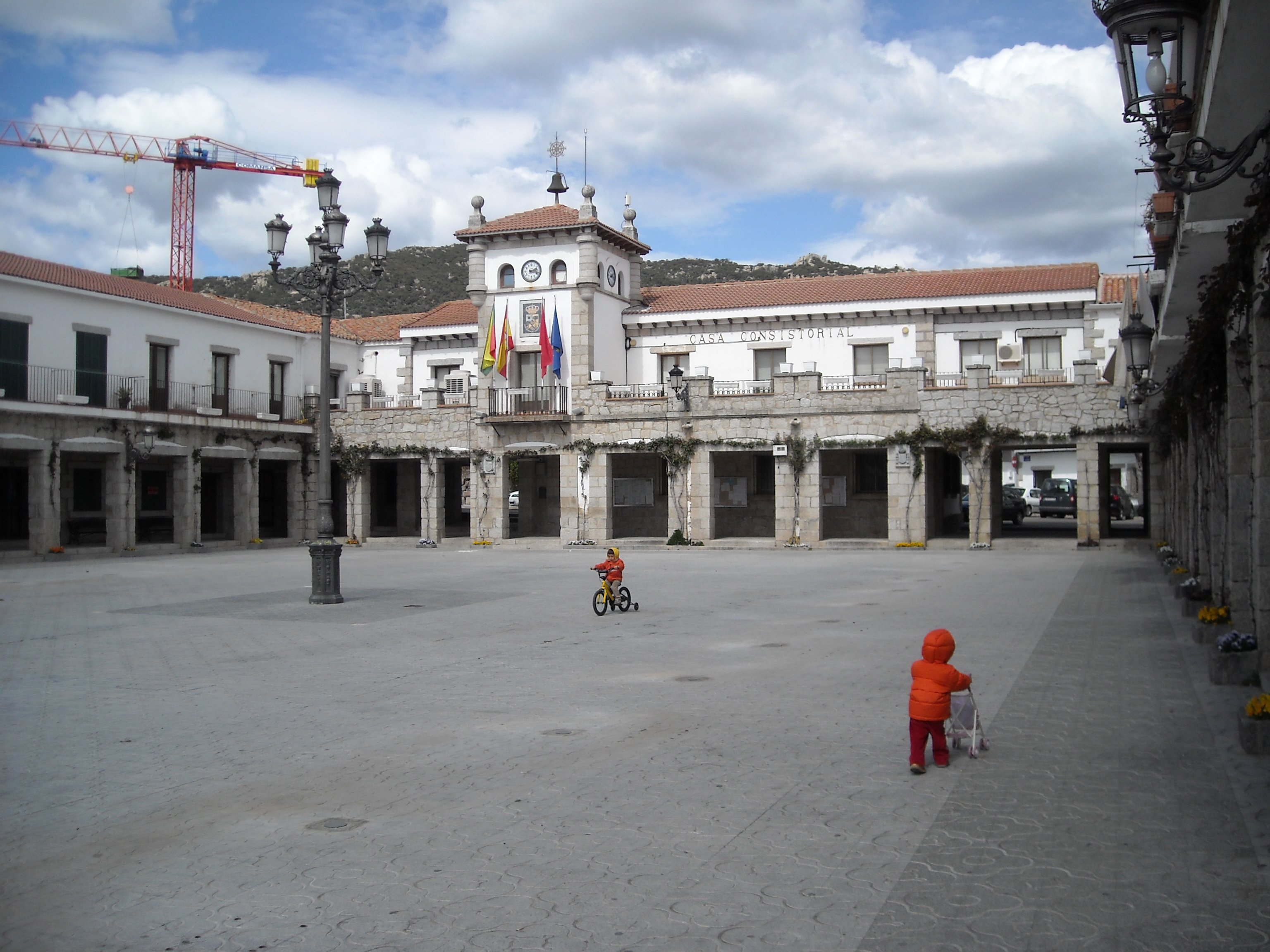
The Main Square and Town Hall of Hoyo de Manzanares, Madrid, Spain

Much evidence has been found of ancient life in this small town, but it was not until the Middle Ages that life has actually been documented in this particular district of Madrid.

After the Reconquista, Hoyo de Manzanares was quickly repopulated by Moriscos, Philistines, Segovians and of course Madrilenos. This mixed population remained stable until 1609-1614 when the Spanish government forced Moriscos to leave the Kingdom of Spain after the marriage of Isabella of Castile and Ferdinand of Aragon. The town then lost most of its population, which nonetheless remained stable for the following years.

Scenes from the 1964 movie “A Fistful of Dollars” were filmed here.

== Education ==
There are all the forms of education in Hoyo de Manzanares. The first is a private daycare named Babyplay and the second is a public daycare named Los Tajetes. There is one public preschool, one public elementary school and one public secondary school. There is also a private university named the Universidad Antonio de Nebrija.

== Military academy ==
The Academy of Engineers of Madrid, founded in 1803, is located in Hoyo de Manzanares. The academy contains one of the largest libraries of northern Madrid, including various donated volumes about the Spanish Civil War.

== Other sources ==
- King, Nikola. "Campaign Military English: Find out about the Campaign Authors." Campaign Military. Macmillan, n.d. Web. 7 Feb. 2014.
- Clavero Roda, Alberto (2000). Hoyo de Manzanares en la Historia. ISBN 84-606-2948-1.
- Las comunidades judía, musulmana y anglicana disponen de cementerios propios en Madrid, El País, 1 de noviembre de 1986.
- «"La muerte tenía un precio" (en este artículo se allude al filme "Por un puñado de dólares", rodado en la Sierra de Hoyo)». Revista Fantastique (2007). Consultado el 2007.
- La línea 611A no circula sábados, domingos ni festivos según, cubriendo la 611 parte de su recorrido esos días
- La Sierra de Hoyo de Manzanares. El campo militar de adiestramiento de El Palancar y sus condiciones ambientales. VV.AA. Ministerio de Defensa. 2003 176 páginas ISBN 84-9781-055-4
