= Moralzarzal =

- Municipality
- Coat of arms

- Location in Spain
- Coordinates: 40°40′30″N 3°58′10″W
- Country: Spain
- Autonomous community: Madrid
- Province: Madrid

Government
  - Alcalde: José María Moreno Martín (2007) (PP)

Area
  - Total: 42.6 km^{2} (16.4 sq mi)
- Elevation: 979 m (3,212 ft)

Population (2025-01-01)
  - Total: 14,772
  - Density: 347/km^{2} (898/sq mi)
- Demonym: cebollero/a
- Time zone: UTC+1 (CET)
  - Summer (DST): UTC+2 (CEST)
- Postal code: 28411
- Website: Official website

Moralzarzal is a town in Spain. It is located in the Sierra de Guadarrama, in the Community of Madrid. It had a population of 11,318 in 2008.

== Public Transport ==
Moralzarzal has a big bus network. The bus lines going through Moralzarzal are the following:

- 670: Collado Villalba (Hospital)
- 671: Madrid (Moncloa)
- 672: Madrid (Moncloa) - Cerceda (by Mataelpino)
- 672A: Madrid (Moncloa) - Cerceda
- 720: Colmenar Viejo - Collado Villalba
- 876: Collado Villalba - Cerceda - Madrid (Plaza de Castilla)
- Night bus line 603: Moralzarzal - Villalba - Madrid (Moncloa)
