= CIPCE =

Concurso Internacional de Piano Compositores de España
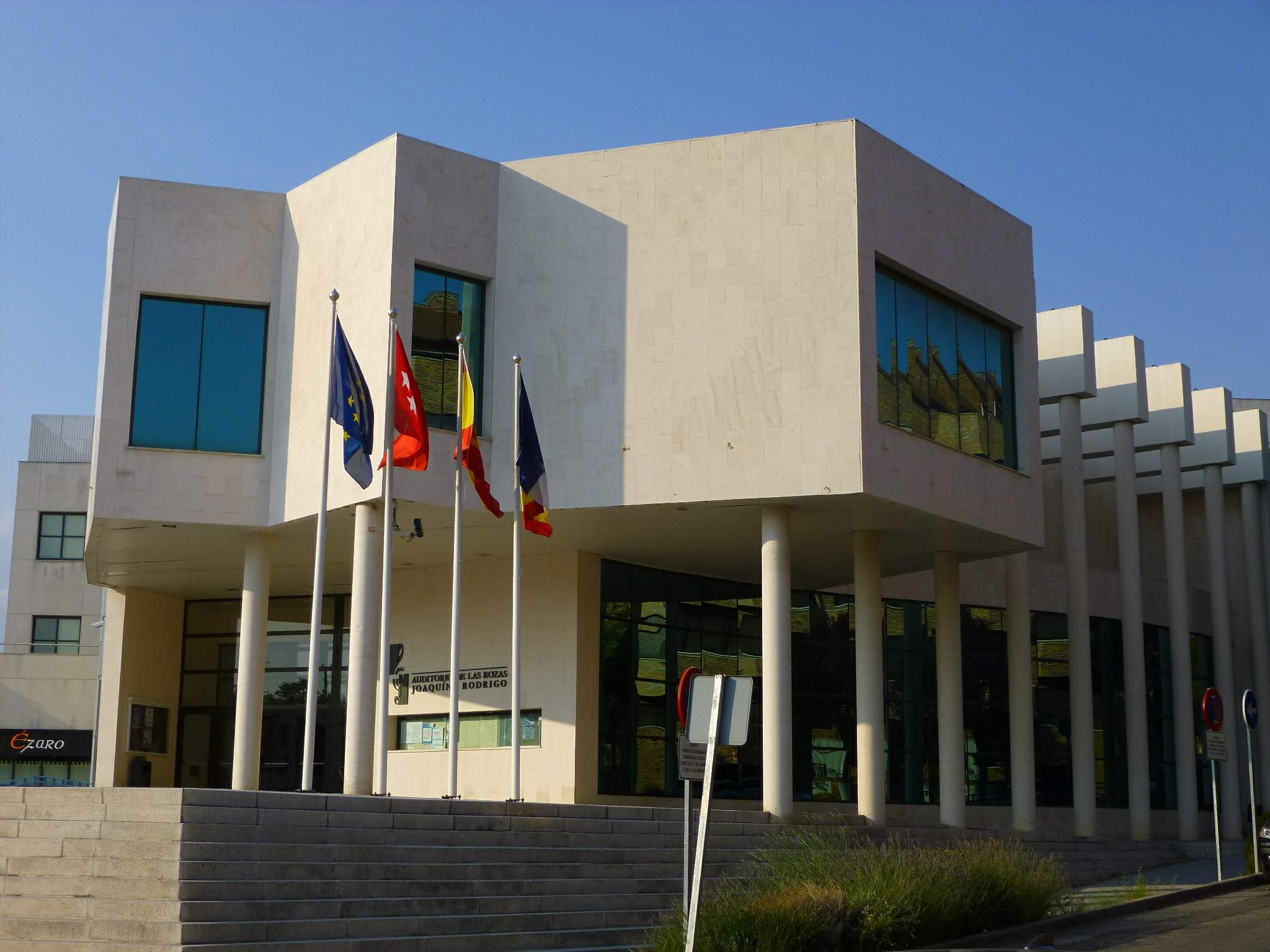
- Joaquín Rodrigo Auditorium
- Venue: Joaquín Rodrigo Auditorium, Las Rozas de Madrid
- First award: 2000; 26 years ago
- Final award: 2023
- Website: cipce.org/en/home/

C.I.P.C.E. is the international piano competition celebrating Spanish composers (in Spanish: Concurso Internacional de Piano Compositores de España), which is held each year around November in the auditorium “Joaquín Rodrigo” of Las Rozas de Madrid with an international jury of renowned musicians. Each year a different Spanish composer is honored, allowing the public the opportunity of enjoying a range of piano works.

CIPCE is a member of the World Federation of International Music Competitions since the year 2022. Competitors who have achieved an appropriate standard set by the federation may pass directly to the second stage of the competition.

== Composers honoured ==
- 2000 Antón García Abril
- 2001 Xavier Montsalvatge
- 2002 Tomás Marco
- 2003 Carlos Cruz de Castro
- 2004 Joaquín Rodrigo
- 2005 Zulema de La Cruz
- 2006 Gabriel Fernández Álvez
- 2007 Claudio Prieto
- 2008 Cristóbal Halffter
- 2009 Joaquín Turina
- 2010 José Zárate
- 2011 Salvador Brotons
- 2012 Isaac Albéniz
- 2013 Antón García Abril
- 2014 Miguel Ángel Gómez Martínez
- 2015 Juan Medina
- 2016 Alejandro Román
- 2017 Juan Manuel Ruiz
- 2018 José Luis Turina
- 2019 Juan Durán
- 2021 Pascual Gimeno
- 2022 Enrique Granados
- 2023 Manuel de Falla
- 2024 Tomás Marco

== Prize winners ==
Edition and composer	Year	1st prize	2nd prize	3rd prize
25th - Padre Antonio Soler	2025	(South Korea) Geonhee Lee	(South Korea) Geonwoo Yi	(Spain) Alejandro de Castro García
24th – Tomás Marco	2024	(Belarus) Uladzislau Khandohi	not awarded	(China) Zhilin Chen (ex aequo) (Spain) Marta Tejero Fernández (ex aequo)
23rd – Manuel de Falla	2023	(Russia) Kadizha Israpil	(Czech Republic) Robert Bílý	(Spain) Laura Ballestrino Mateos
22nd – Enrique Granados	2022	(Spain) Eugenia Sánchez Durán	(Russia) Artem Kuznetsov	(Russia) Dmitry Sin
21st – Pascual Gimeno	2021	(United States) (Russia) Angel Stanislav Wang	(Czech Republic) Pjotr Naryshkin	(Spain) Eugenia Sánchez Durán
20th – Juan Durán Alonso	2019	(Switzerland) (Germany) Dominic Chamot	(Ukraine) Roman Lopatunskyi	(South Korea) Jaeeyoon Lee
19th – José Luis Turina	2018	(Australia) Harrison Herman	(China) Zixi Chen	(United States) Rachel Breen
18th – Juan Manuel Ruiz	2017	(Russia) Evgeny Konnov	(Australia) Harrison Herman	(Russia) Samson Tsoy
17th – Alejandro Román	2016	(Spain) Pedro López Salas	(Italy) Pier Carmine Garzillo	(Russia) Georgy Voylochnikov
16th – Juan Medina	2015	(Ukraine) Kirylo Korsunenko	(China) Moye Chen	(Australia) Harrison Herman
15th – Miguel Ángel Gómez Martínez	2014	(South Korea) Su Yeon Kim	(Georgia (country)) Ana Kipiani	(Azerbaijan) Toghrul Huseynli
14th – Antón García Abril	2013	(Ukraine) Kateryna Titova	(Russia) Nikolai Saratovskii	(Spain) Antonio Bernaldo de Quirós Yazama
13th – Isaac Albéniz	2012	(Belgium) Philippe Raskin	(South Korea) Yedam Kim	(Japan) Natsuki Nishimoto
12th – Salvador Brotons	2011	(Spain) José Ramón García Pérez	(Japan) Yoshifumi Morita	(Israel) Maria Yulin
11th – José Zárate	2010	(Ukraine) (Austria) Pavlo Kachnov	(Romania) Arcadie Triboi	(Russia) Pavel Raykerus
10th – Joaquín Turina	2009	(Russia) Alexey Chernov	(Russia) Olga Kozlova	(Russia) Ilona Timchenko
9th – Cristóbal Halffter	2008	(Russia) Alexander Yakovlev	(France) Evelina Borbei	(Japan) Kazuya Saito
8th – Claudio Prieto	2007	(Russia) Daniil Tsvetkov	(Georgia (country)) Vakhtang Kodanashvili	(Ukraine) (Germany) Maria Baranova
7th – Gabriel Fernández Álvez	2006	(Russia) Sergei Tarasov	(Israel) Michael Namirovsky	(Russia) Alexey Kurbatov
6th – Zulema de la Cruz	2005	(Spain) Juan Francisco Lago	(Spain) Enrique Bernaldo de Quirós	(Brazil) Paulo Brasil
5th – Joaquín Rodrigo	2004	(Russia) Evgueni Starodoubtsev	(Germany) Julian Riem	(Czech Republic) Václav Pacl
4th – Carlos Cruz de Castro	2003	(South Korea) Yung Wook Yoo		
3rd – Tomás Marco	2002	(Italy) Federico Gianello		
2nd – Xavier Montsalvatge	2001	(Italy) Calogero Di Liberto		
1st – Antón García Abril	2000	(Spain) Antonio Jesús Cruz		
