= Evgeny Konnov =

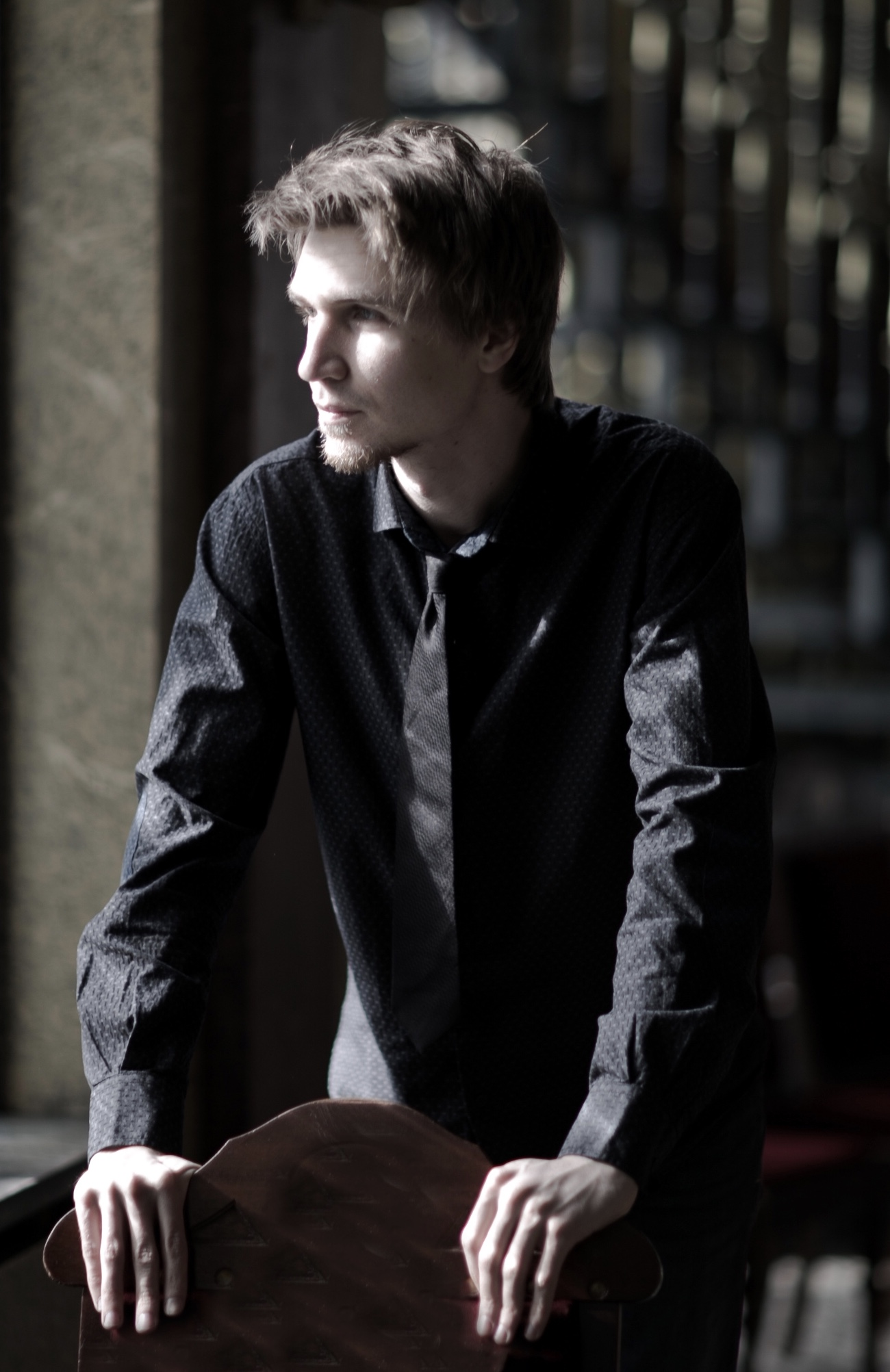

Background information
- Born: November 19, 1992 (age 33); Chirchiq, Uzbekistan
- Genres: Classical
- Occupation: Musician
- Instrument: Piano

Evgeny Konnov (born 19 November 1992 in Chirchiq, Uzbekistan) is a Russian pianist. He is the winner of first prizes in more than 30 international competitions, including first prize and public prize at the 64th Maria Canals International Music Competition in Barcelona 2018, first prize at the 30th New Orleans International Piano Competition USA, first prize and public prize at the 31st International Ettore Pozzoli Piano Competition in Seregno 2019, first prize at the 14th Unisa International Piano Competition in South Africa 2020, first prize at the Concurso Internacional de Piano Compositores de España CIPCE in Las Rozas de Madrid - all members of the World Federation of International Music Competitions. Following his success as a laureate and Audience Award recipient at the George Enescu International Competition, he made his highly acclaimed debut at the George Enescu Festival in 2025.

== Music education ==
Evgeny Konnov began to study piano at the age of four with Natalia Krivosheina, and in 1999 he entered in the Gnesin Music School in Moscow, Russia under Tatiana Sarkisians supervision. From 2008 to 2012 he studied at the Academic Music College in Moscow, Russia with Natalia Syslova. From 2012 to 2013 he studied at the Robert Schumann Hochschule in Düsseldorf, Germany under Professor Georg Friedrich Schenck supervision. From 2013 to 2021 he studied with Evgenia Rubinova at the Leopold Mozart Centre of the University of Augsburg and from 2017 to 2021 with Professor Albert Mamriev at the Music Academy "Neue Sterne" in Hannover, Germany. From 2019 to 2022 he studied with Professor Jan Gottlieb Jiracek von Arnim at the University of Music and Performing Arts Vienna. From 2022 to 2024 he studied historical keyboard instruments with Professor Christoph Hammer at the Leopold Mozart Centre of the University of Augsburg.

== Career ==
After winning the 60th Augsburg City Art Award Evgeny was Artist in Residence at the Staatstheater Augsburg during the 2020/2021 season. His debut album was released by Naxos in 2022 with piano sonatas by the Catalan composer Antonio Soler and was highly acclaimed by the international press. In 2023, Evgeny recorded Liszt´s Études d’exécution transcendante by Solfa Recordings, which also received outstanding reviews.

Konnov has given concerts in numerous concert halls in Spain (National Auditorium of Music, Palau de la Música Catalana, Euskalduna Conference Centre and Concert Hall, Auditorio Manuel de Falla, Museu Nacional d'Art de Catalunya, L'Auditori), Germany (Gasteig), Romania (Romanian Athenaeum), South Africa (Linder Auditorium in Johannesburg, Playhaus in Durban), Portugal (Casa da Música), France (Salle Cortot in Paris), Russia (Great Hall of Moscow Conservatory), Italy (Teatro Dal Verme, Casa di Riposo per Musicisti), Austria (Konzerthaus, Vienna), Brussels (Flagey Building), Japan (Act City Hamamatsu), USA, Netherlands, Poland, Malta, Uzbekistan and Morocco.

He has performed as soloist with Orquesta Sinfónica de Madrid, Orquesta Sinfónica de Tenerife, Bilbao Orkestra Sinfonikoa, City of Granada Orchestra, Louisiana Philharmonic Orchestra, Jove Orquestra Nacional de Catalunya, George Enescu Philharmonic Orchestra, Johannesburg Philharmonic Orchestra, KwaZulu-Natal Philharmonic Orchestra, Augsburger Philharmoniker, Royal Camerata Orchestra, Pitesti Philharmonic, Fondazione Arena di Verona Orchestra, Orquestra Internacional Virtuosos de Madrid, Orchestra Filarmonica Mihail Jora di Bacau, Orchestra Sinfonica Citta di Grosseto, Orchestra Antonio Vivaldi, Orchestra Sinfonica di Sanremo, Ryazan Symphony Orchestra, Philharmonic Orchestra Wernigerode, Vienna City Orchestra, Orquestra Filarmonica Portuguesa.

Many of his recordings and interviews were broadcast by radio and television broadcasters: BBC Radio, Radio Orpheus, WGNO, RTBF, augsburg.tv, TGR, Russia-K, TVR Cultural, Radio România Muzical, Romanian National Radio and others.

He also takes part as a jury member at such competitions as Compositores de España International Piano Competition in Las Rozas de Madrid , Clavis Bavaria and A. Scriabin International Piano Competition in Grosseto. Since 2024 he is a piano teacher at the Leopold Mozart Centre of the University of Augsburg.

== Awards ==
(Selection)

Year	Competition	Prize
2016	(Morocco) Rabat International Piano Competition Her Royal Highness Princess Lalla Meryem	1st prize
2017	Valletta Malta International Piano Festival and Competition	1st prize
2017	(Spain) Las Rozas de Madrid 18th Compositores de España International Piano Competition	1st prize
2018	(Spain) Barcelona 64th Maria Canals International Music Competition	1st prize
2018	(Italy) Cantu 28th International Piano Competition Città di Cantù	1st prize
2019	(Italy) : Grosseto 21st International Piano Competition Alexander Scriabin	1st prize
2019	(Italy) : Seregno 31st International Ettore Pozzoli Piano Competition	1st prize
2020	(Austria) : Vienna 2nd Vienna International Music Competition	1st prize
2020	(South Africa) : Pretoria 14th Unisa International Piano Competition	1st prize
2022	(Germany) Wernigerode 7th International Music Competition Neue Sterne	1st prize
2023	(Italy) Sanremo 4th International Russian Piano Music Piano Competition	1st prize
2024	(Italy) Verona 12th Verona International Piano Competition	1st prize
2025	(Italy) Chieti Accordi Musicali Piano Competition	1st prize
2026	(United States) New Orleans 30th New Orleans International Piano Competition USA	1st prize
