= History of Las Rozas =

According to some historians Las Rozas de Madrid could have been a Roman mansion or staging-post called Miacum, from which the name Madrid may have derived. This is somewhat speculative, although there is evidence of occupation locally in about the 3rd century of the Common Era when the Roman Empire was active in Spain.

Las Rozas is located on the Roman Military Route between Segovia and Titulcia and eventually to Emerita Augusta, and is adjacent to the Rio Guadarrama, which provided plentiful fresh water all year round. The modern name means 'the clearings' which may have related to military activity, as the agricultural value if the area is low, and the traditional economic activity seems to have been sheep rearing.

The first document that refers to Las Rozas itself dates from 1376, although it would appear that the town existed earlier than that. The town of "Las Rozas" appears in Volume V of the "Relaciones Historico-Geografico-Estadisticas" ("Historical, Geographical, and Statistical List") of the towns of Spain that was written during the reign of Felipe II and that is now kept in the library at the El Escorial Monastery.

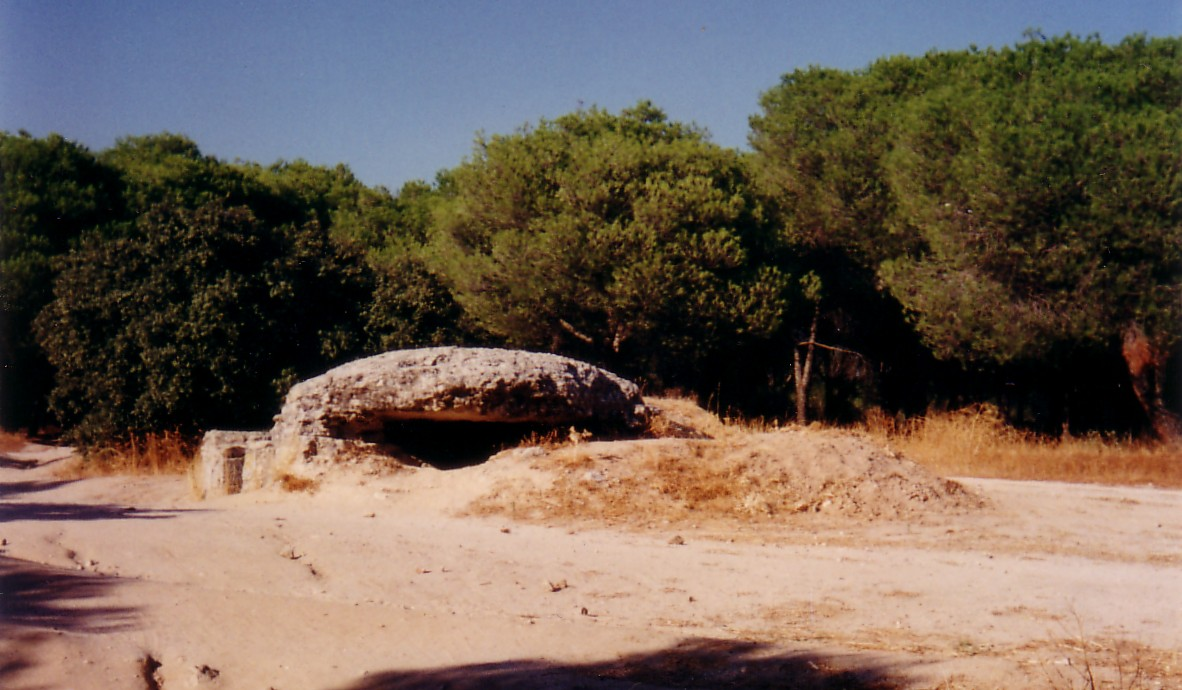
Bunker of the Spanish civil War

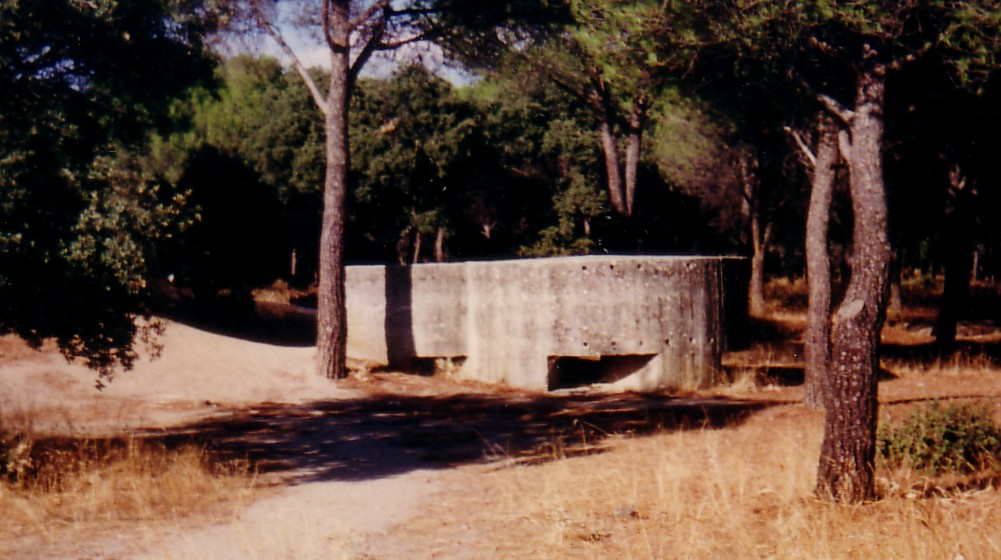
Bunker in the Dehesa of Navalcarbón

== Middle Ages ==
The Pasture of Holy María of the Retamar appears mentioned in a letter dated to November 18, 1303 in a lawsuit between Madrid and Segovia also relating to settlements at Galapagar, Torrelodones and Colmenarejo. The legend says that the Virgin of the Retamar appeared there, but the contemporary carved image is not that today appears in a scallop niche in the Church of San Miguel and which is used for the processions that carry the Virgin to the new hermitage church that was built in the 1990s, which is a little nearer the town, next to Dehesa de Navalcarbón (the original, as 'pasture' suggests was near the river.

== Industrial Revolution ==
During the reign of Carlos III an ambitious project was conceived to create a navigable canal sourced by the river Guadarrama which would link Madrid to the Atlantic Ocean. Finally in 1875 a French Engineer, Charles Lemur started work. Only 27 km was actually built (the dam of El Gasco, the regulating reservoir) when a great storm destroyed the project. A short section has been restored in the Dehesa de Navalcarbon nature park.

In a map of the year 1755, the name (Las Matas) appears, that was populated by laborers that built the highway to Segovia (now part of the Autovia A-6). Subsequently it has been a center of research and development for the railways, now Renfe and that was the main source of local employment.

== Civil War ==
During the Spanish Civil War the area was held Mainly by republicans, and saw a number of large battles, and remnants of bunkers from that era can still be seen today in the Navalcarbón meadows.

In the winter of 1936, pro-Franco troops advanced on western Madrid from the bases of Brunete, Villaviciosa de Odón and Campamento. In fog and very low temperatures, Republican and Nationalist troops, along with air support, fought one of the worst battles of the civil war in Madrid. The inhabitants of Las Rozas took refuge in other places around the Sierra de Guadarrama mountains, such as the caves of Hoyo de Manzanares.

The Church of San Miguel and almost all the houses in Las Rozas were completely destroyed in the battle. At the end of the war, the government created the Department of Devastated Areas in order to assist with the reconstruction of towns destroyed by the war, among which was Las Rozas, where about six rows of six or seven small houses were cheaply built near the church. One or two of these remain as of 2010, and efforts are in hand to preserve them for posterity.

== Post Democracy ==
Since 'Democracy' (c.1975) and the advent of cheap travel the settlement has expanded from a pastoral village of some 6000 souls to a dormitory town of Madrid with a population of almost 100,000. As of 2010 there are still two flocks of sheep which graze on the riverbank of the Rio Guardarrama nature-park. Wild pigs, displaced from their natural habitat by building, are sometimes found in the streets of El Cantizal and El Molino de la Hoz in the north of the township.

The Compositores de España International Piano Competition has been held here since about 2000.

Recent concerns about the ecology, air pollution in Madrid and 'peak oil' have prompted schemes to use railway stations more effectively and reduce the reliance of children on 'mum's taxi service' by promoting pedilecs and electric vehicles.
