= Pozzoni =

Pozzoni is an Italian surname. Notable people with the surname include:

- Dominic Pozzoni (1861–1924), Italian-born Bishop
- Paola Pozzoni (born 1965), Italian cross-country skier

== See also ==
- Pozzoli
