= Kristina Sandulova =

Dutch pianist of Bulgarian descent (born 1978)

Kristina Stefanova Sandulova (Bulgarian: Кристина Стефанова Сандулова, born May 11, 1978 in Sofia, Bulgaria) is a Dutch pianist of Bulgarian descent. She emigrated to the Netherlands in 2001. She lived in Vienna, Austria between 2009 and 2015, when she moved to Hamburg. She has an international concert career.

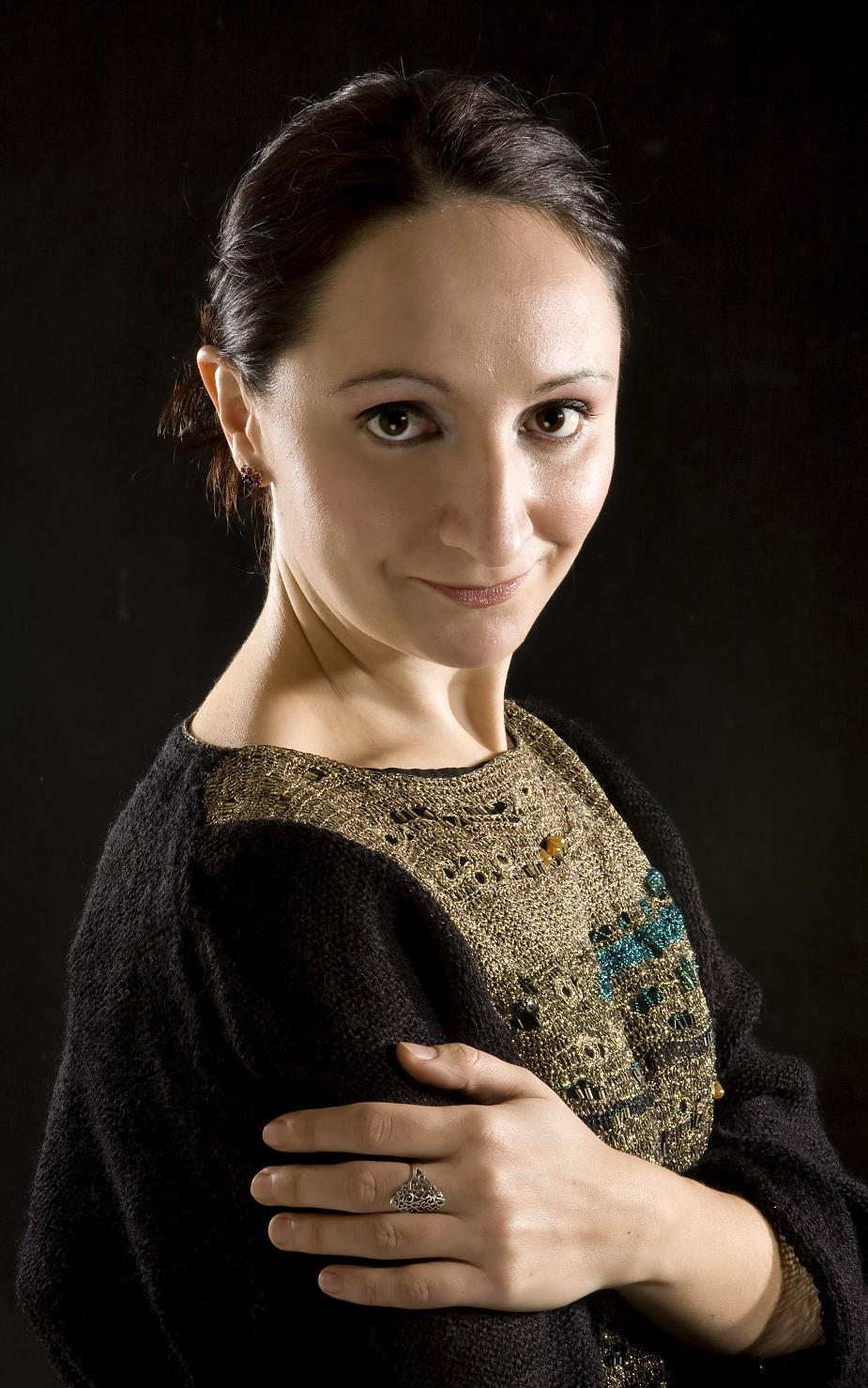
Kristina Sandulova

Sandulova is the daughter of the renowned Bulgarian composer Julia Tsenova.

== Biography ==
Kristina Sandulova began her piano studies with her mother, the composer Julia Tsenova, having her first public performance at the age of six, at the National Palace of Culture (НДК). She later studied at the National Academy of Music “Pancho Vladigerov” under the supervision of prof. Stella Dimitrova-Maistrova. In 2001 she received a grant from the “Stichting Labberté-Hoedemaker Fonds” in order to continue her studies in the Netherlands. There Sandulova studied with Paul Komen, Geoffrey Madge and Klára Würtz at the Prince Claus Conservatoire, the Royal Conservatory of The Hague and the Conservatory of Utrecht, respectively.

Currently Sandulova resides in Vienna, Austria, and has an international concert career, having performed in the Netherlands, Austria, Germany, Irelend, Bulgaria, Norway, Iceland, Japan and the United Kingdom. She is also the founder of the “Julia Tsenova Music & Arts Tribute”, a concert series dedicated to the memory of her mother, Julia Tsenova, which began as a joint initiative with artist-composer Joseph Johannes Visser.

Sandulova participated in numerous international festivals for contemporary music, including “ppIANISSIMO” in Sofia, Bulgaria and the “Buchkunstbiennale” in Horn, Austria. She has also delivered international piano master classes and lecture-recitals about Julia Tsenova, among others at the Koyo Conservatory in Kobe, Japan, the Reykjavík College of Music in Iceland and the Staatliche Hochschule für Musik und Darstellende Kunst Mannheim, Germany.

== Competitions Record ==
Sandulova has prizes at the following national and international competitions:

- “Liszt-Bartok competition”, Sofia, Bulgaria: Honorable mention (1995).
- “Music and Earth competition”, Sofia, Bulgaria: Piano Duo Performance, awarded by Julia Ganeva and Konstantin Ganev (1996).
- “Music and Earth competition”, Sofia, Bulgaria: Award for Artistic Merit (1997).

== Premiere performances ==
Sandulova has performed Bulgarian, Dutch and world premiere works of the following composers:

- Julia Tsenova (Bulgaria)
- Atanas Kosev (Bulgaria)
- Andre Hamel (Canada)
- Rumen Baliozov (Bulgaria)
- Dimitar Christov (Bulgaria)
- Marzena Komsta (Poland)
- Tsveta Dimitrova (Bulgaria)
- Petar Petrov (Bulgaria)
- Vykintas Baltakas (Lithuania)
- James Mobberley (USA)
- Lazar Nivolov (Bulgaria)
- Dimitar Kirov (Bulgaria)
- Oscar Carmona (Chile)
