= Graphical language =

Graphical language may refer to:

- Graphical modeling language, graphical types of artificial language to express information or knowledge
- Visual language, a system of communication using visual elements
- Visual programming language, a computer programming language to create programs by manipulating program elements graphically
