= Compositores de España International Piano Competition =

The Compositores de España International Piano Competition is held annually at Las Rozas de Madrid's Joaquín Rodrigo Auditorium since 2000. Each edition revolves around the works of a usually living Spanish composer.

== Palmares ==
Prize Winners
Year
| 2000 | Honoree | Winner |
|---|---|---|---|---|
| | (Aragon) Antón García Abril | (Spain) Antonio Jesús Cruz |
| 2001 | Honoree | Winner |
| | (Catalonia) Xavier Montsalvatge | (Italy) Calogero Di Liberto |
| 2002 | Honoree | Winner |
| | (Aragon) Tomás Marco | (Italy) Federico Gianello |
| 2003 | Honoree | Winner |
| | (Community of Madrid) Carlos Cruz de Castro | (South Korea) Yung Wook Yoo |
| 2004 | Honoree | 1st Prize | 2nd Prize | 3rd Prize |
| | (Valencian Community) Joaquín Rodrigo | (Russia) Yevgeny Starodoubtsev | (Germany) Julian Riem | (Czech Republic) Vaclav Pacl |
| | | | | Mention of honor |
| | | | | (Russia) Karina Azizova |
| 2005 | Honoree | 1st Prize | 2nd Prize | 3rd Prize |
| | (Community of Madrid) Zulema de la Cruz | (Spain) Juan Francisco Lago | (Spain) Enrique Bernaldo de Quirós | (Brazil) Paulo Brasil |
| | | | | Special Prize |
| | | | | (Japan) Kumiko Yoshida-Li |
| | | | | Mention of Honor |
| | | | | (Cuba) Alonso Orlando |
| 2006 | Honoree | 1st Prize | 2nd Prize | 3rd Prize |
| | (Community of Madrid) Gabriel Fernández Álvez | (Russia) Sergei Tarasov | (Israel) Michael Namirovsky | (Russia) Alexey Kurbatov |
| | | | | Mention of Honor |
| | | | | (Spain) Enrique Bernaldo de Quirós |
| 2007 | Honoree | 1st Prize | 2nd Prize | 3rd Prize |
| | (Castile and León) Claudio Prieto | (Kazakhstan) Daniil Tsvetkov | (Georgia (country)) Vakhtang Kodanashvili | (Ukraine) Maria Baranova |
| | | | | Mention of Honor |
| | | | | (Spain) Enrique Bernaldo de Quirós |
| 2008 | Honoree | 1st Prize | 2nd Prize | 3rd Prize |
| | (Community of Madrid) Cristóbal Halffter | (Russia) Alexander Yakovlev | (France) Evelina Borbei | (Japan) Kazuya Saito |
| | | | | Mention of Honor |
| | | | | (Italy) Scipione Sangiovanni |
| 2009 | Honoree | 1st Prize | 2nd Prize | 3rd Prize |
| | (Andalusia) Joaquín Turina | (Russia) Alexei Chernov | (Russia) Olga Kozlova | (Russia) Ilona Timchenko |
| | | | | Mention of Honor |
| | | | | (Russia) Pavel Raykerus |
| 2010 | Honoree | 1st Prize | 2nd Prize | 3rd Prize |
| | (Community of Madrid) José Zárate | (Ukraine) Pavlo Kachnov | (Romania) Arcadie Triboi | (Russia) Pavel Raykerus |
| | | | | Mention of Honor |
| | | | | (Russia) Olga Kurchaeva |
| 2011 | Honoree | 1st Prize | 2nd Prize | 3rd Prize |
| | (Catalonia) Salvador Brotons | (Spain) José Ramón García Pérez | (Japan) Yoshifumi Morita | (Israel) Maria Yulin |
| 2012 | Honoree | 1st Prize | 2nd Prize | 3rd Prize |
| | (Catalonia) Isaac Albéniz | (Belgium) Philippe Raskin | (South Korea) Kim Yedam | (Japan) Natsuki Kishimoto |
| 2013 | Honoree | 1st Prize | 2nd Prize | 3rd Prize |
| | (Aragon) Antón García Abril | (Ukraine) Kateryna Titova | (Russia) Nikolai Saratovsky | (Spain) Antonio Bernaldo de Quirós Yazama |
| 2014 | Honoree | 1st Prize | 2nd Prize | 3rd Prize |
| | (Granada) Miguel Ángel Gómez Martínez | (South Korea) Su Yeon Kim | (Georgia (country)) Ana Kipiani | (Azerbaijan) Toghrul Huseynli |
| 2015 | Honoree | 1st Prize | 2nd Prize | 3rd Prize |
| | (Aragon) Juan Medina | (Ukraine) Kirylo Korsunenko | (China) Moye Chen | (Australia) Harrison Herman |
| 2016 | Honoree | 1st Prize | 2nd Prize | 3rd Prize |
| | (Spain) Alejandro Román | (Spain) Pedro Lópes Salas | (Italy) Pier Carmine Garzillo | (Russia) Georgy Voylochnikov |
| 2017 | Honoree | 1st Prize | 2nd Prize | 3rd Prize |
| | (Spain) Juan Manuel Ruíz | (Russia) Evgeny Konnov | (Australia) Harrison Herman | (Kazakhstan) Samson Tsoy |
| 2018 | Honoree | 1st Prize | 2nd Prize | 3rd Prize |
| | (Spain) José Luis Turina | (Australia) Harrison Herman | (China) Zixi Chen | (United States) Rachel Breen |

-
