= Alejandro Román =

Spanish composer and pianist

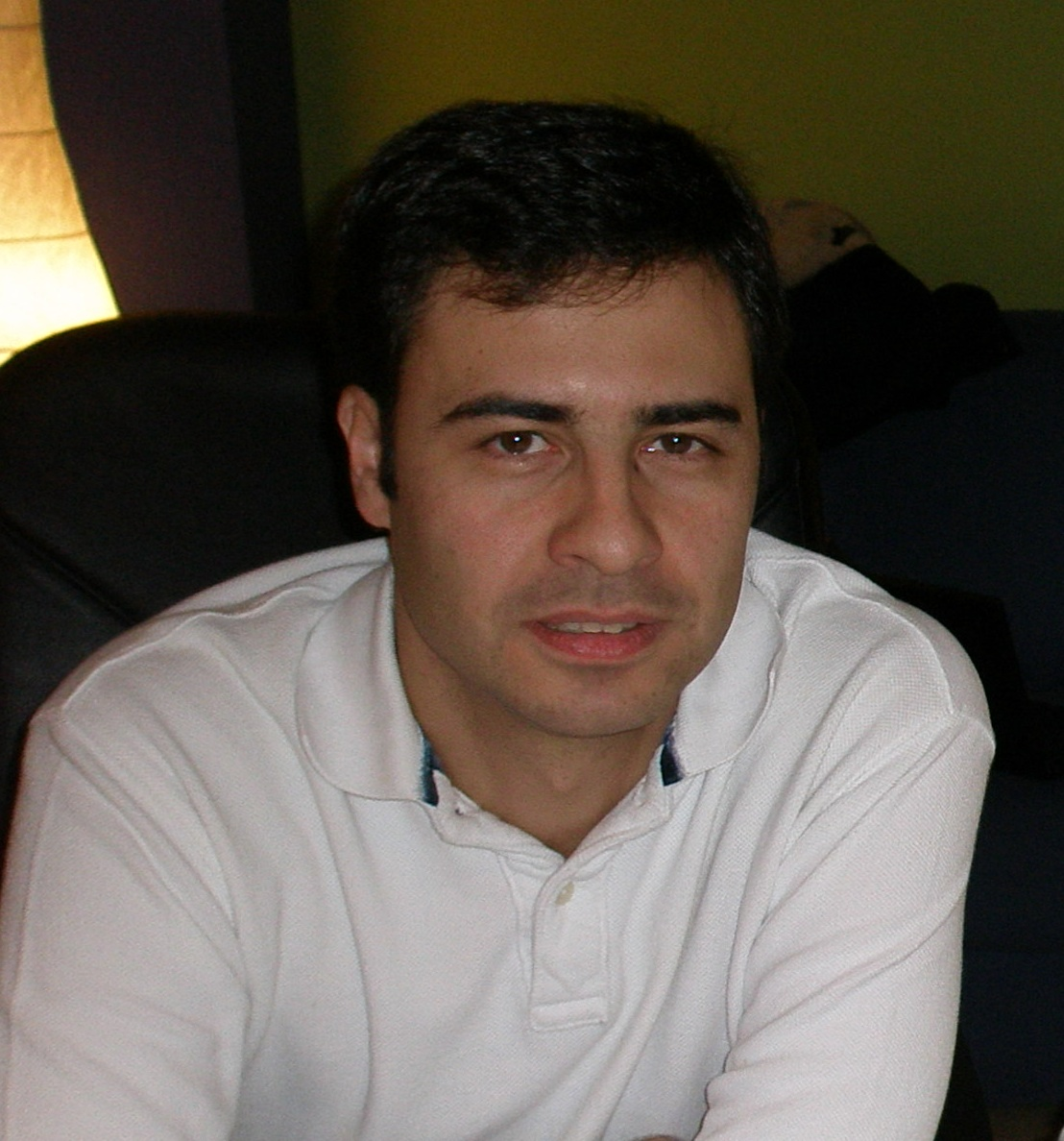

Background information
- Born: Alejandro López Román; 1971 (age 54–55); Madrid, Spain
- Genres: Film score, Jazz
- Occupations: Composer, musician

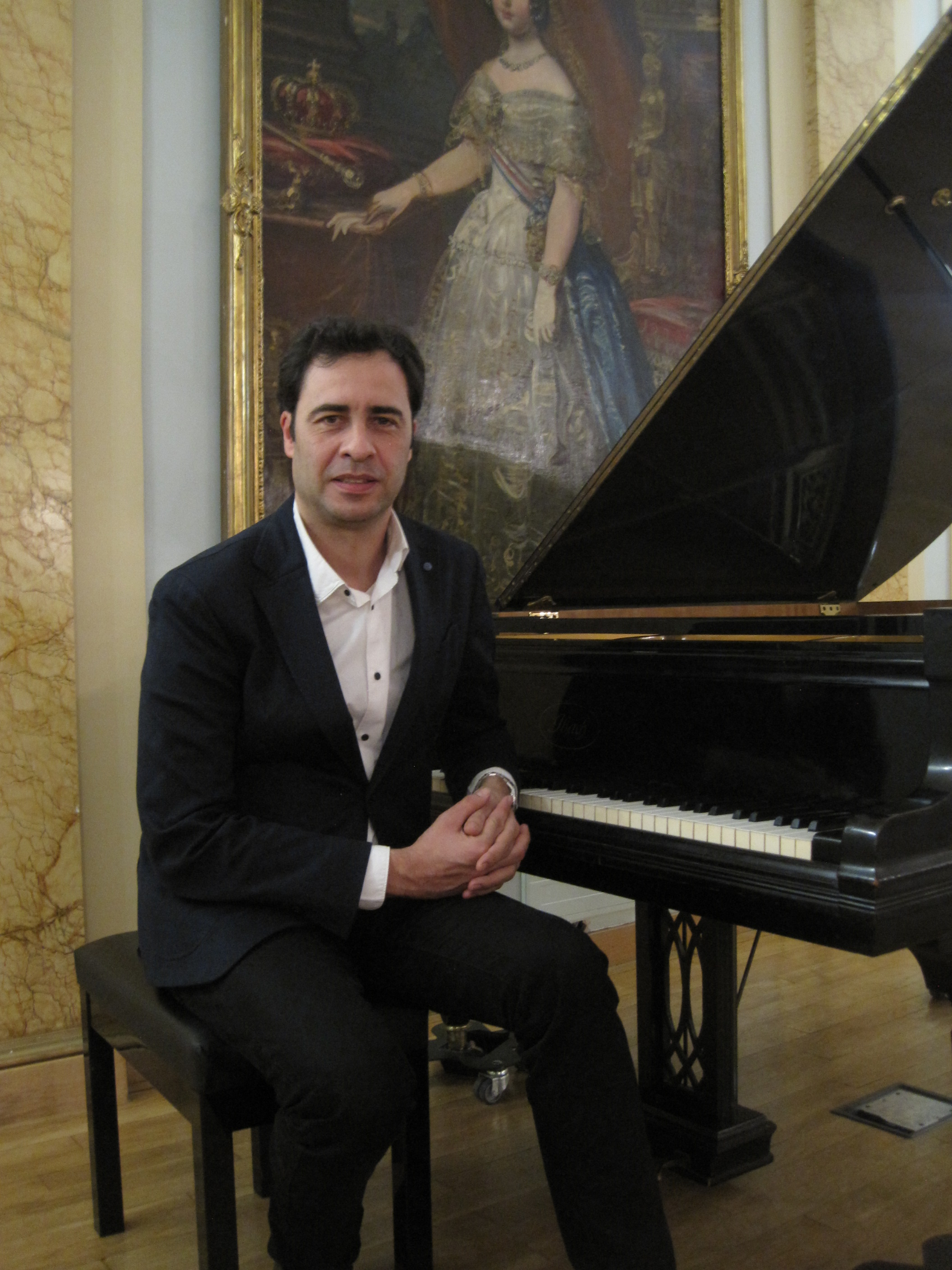
Alejandro Román

Alejandro López Román (born 1971) is a Spanish composer and pianist. Musician of eclectic style, his works cover both current symphonic composition like jazz or film music.

== Biography ==
Born in Madrid, he studied composition with Antón García Abril, Valentín Ruiz and Zulema de la Cruz at the Royal Conservatory of Music in Madrid. From 1991 to 1995 he was awarded scholarships by the AIE (Society of Artists and Performers) for studies of Jazz with Tony Heimer, Jorge Villaescusa and Ricard Miralles (piano), Claudio Gabis, Eva Gancedo and Miguel Blanco (harmony, composition and arrangements, music theater), Bob Sands and Victor Merlo (improvisation and ensemble). He belonged to several Jazz and Rock groups with whom he recorded a dozen albums.

He has composed over seventy works for piano, voice, guitar, orchestra, chamber, electroacoustic, and teaching music, modern (jazz, pop) and film music, theatre and dance. He has scored fifteen short films and three feature films.

In 2014 he obtained the Doctorate in Philosophy from the Department of Aesthetics, UNED, after completion of his thesis "Musivisual analysis, audition guide and study of film music", where he analyses the connections between the language of image and musical language.

In 2003 he became a Professor at the department for Audiovisual Composition of the Royal Conservatory of Music in Madrid, where he launched the Classroom "CINEMA" (Composition and Research in the Audiovisual Media).

== Awards ==
2004 Award for Best Original Soundtrack by Niño Vudú by Toni Bestard in "IX Festival de Cine Ciudad de Zaragoza"

2005 Award from the I Forum of Young Composers of the Fundación Sax-Ensemble by Argos, for saxophone quintet, two percussionists and piano

2005 4th Prize "Juan Crisóstomo Arriaga" by Ménades for chamber orchestra, the "Young Composers XVI Premio SGAE"

2007 2nd Prize "Angel Iglesias" by Dos Estudios Extraños, for guitar, in "II Guitar Composition Competition Ciudad de Badajoz"

2015 "Cultura Viva Award" in the "Music" category of the XXIV Edition of the Spanish National Viva Cultura Awards for its extensive and multifaceted work as a creator, performer and pedagogue

2018 Gold Medal (Contemporary Classical and Album), Music Global Awards for the album “Chamber Music”

2017 Silver Medal. Music Global Awards for “Epojé, Op. 50”, para violoncello y piano

== Catalog of works ==
1990 Danza Espectral for violin, flute, clarinet, trombone and piano (out of print)

1992 Oniroplastia Eco, electroacoustic (out of print)

Picnic, electroacoustic (out of print)

1997 Tres preludios nocturnos (Miniaturas, Orillas del Manzanares y Zarabanda) para piano

Tres Gymnopedias Satiéricas for piano
Orestes, for prepared piano (out of print)

1998 Dicen que no me quieres, popular song for singing and piano

A pie van mis suspiros for singing and piano (out of print)
Aquí te traigo María, carol for mixed choir
Tres piezas infantiles, for three cellos and piano and cello

1999 Sonatina para piano

Sonatina, version for flute orchestra (out of print)
Suite “Bacantes”, for flute and harpsichord (or piano)

2000 Sonata para clarinete, violoncello and harp

Homenaje a Bartok for violin, oboe, cello and piano
Entre Arrecifes for piano

2001 Cuarteto de Cuerda

Variaciones para Orquesta sobre un tema de Rameau
Tres Sonetos de Amor for singing and piano
La persistencia de la memoria, electroacoustic
Misa Nupcial de los Pianistas, for singing, violin, cello and organ (out of print)

2002 Estudio para Orquesta

El Criado de don Juan, chamber opera in one act, two tables and four scenes
Tríptico for guitar
Black Cage, for prepared piano and electroacoustic
Vid-erunt Om-nes!!!, electroacoustic

2003 Bacantes, suite for orchestra (out of print)

Clavicosmos, educational pieces for harpsichord
Suite Antigua, for small orchestra
Bacantes, version of the suite for instrumental ensemble (out of print)

2004 Nocturno de Luz, for piano

Monólogo de Sancho Panza, for double bass (with or without reciter)

2005 Piezas Extrañas, for guitar

Argos, for saxophone quintet, two percussionists and piano
El Intrépido Soldadito de Plomo, musical tale for flute, piano, tuba, bass and percussion
Ménades, for instrumental ensemble

2006 Don Quixote en New York, for big-band

Ludus Ludovico, for flute, harp and string quartet
Dos princesas for violin and harp
Treno por Gea for violin, clarinet, cello and piano

2007 Tirsos, for flute and harp

Seguiriya, for bassoon quartet
Bacantes, version for flute and harp

2008 Kithara, for harp

Catálogo de elfos y hadas, for harp
Levedad del amor, for flute, cello and harp

2009 Balcania, for five flutes, contrabass and percussion (and optional video)

Iberia, doce perlas de la aeronáutica española, for flute, violin, violoncello, bandurria and guitar
Eterna Juventud, for two flutes and organ

2010 Acuarelas de Irlanda, for full orchestra

Violituras para Lydia, for violin
Montenegro Airs, for guitar and strings orchestra

2011 Flaurituras para Emma, for flute

Trois Tableaux Français, trio sonata for violin, violoncello and piano
Zootropías, for violin, violoncello and piano

2012 Júbilo, dulce sueño, for flute and harp

2013 Gaiena, diez paisajes jienenses, for piano

Ave María, for mixed choir
Eterna Juventud, for clarinet, harp and organ
Dans la Brousse, for harp
Dance de la Chèvre dans la Brousse, for flute and harp
Pulso Vital, for bassoon

2014 Danzafonía, electronic

Epojé, for violoncello and piano
El Perfecto Desconocido (Suite), orchestra
Diégesis, for violin, violoncello and piano
Be Bop, Be!, for alto saxophone and piano four hands

2015 Nocturno, for mezzo-soprano, viola and piano

Pulso Vital, for violin
Marsias desafiante, for flute, guitar, harpsichord and cello
Changes, for violín
Lamento por las víctimas del 11-M, for violin
Ewig, toccata for piano
Abriliana, for piano
Catálogo de Elfos y Hadas, for piano
OidaRadio2, for piano

2016 Picasso al Cubo, for flute, bandurria, guitar, violin and violoncello with video and electronics

Matar a Cervantes, zarzuela in three acts
Tríptico del Águila, for canto y piano
Canciones Sacras, for canto y piano
Bocetos Flamencos, for piano
Piezas Tétricas, for piano
Tiento de Batalla, for piano

2017 Bocetos Flamencos, for piano four hands

Clarineturas para Jaime, for clarinet
Suite China, for orchestra and children's choir
Collar de Haikus, for piano
Riba Jazz, for alto saxophone and harp

2018 Montenegro Airs, for clarinets ensemble

Praeludium, for clarinet, alto saxophone, violin, violoncello and piano
Seis Segundos Electrizantes, for alto saxophone, violin, violoncello and piano
Areté, for string quintet and piano

2019 Sonata para clarinete, violoncello y piano

Epojé, para violín y piano
'Peán, para flauta, clarinete, saxofón, percusión y piano

== Film Music ==
- Estándar (2020). Feature Film

Director: Fernando González Gómez

- Vasi´s Odissey (2020). Feature Film

Director: Vasileios Papatheocharis

- Danzantes (2020). Documentary Feature Film

Director: Juan Vicente Chuliá

- A Common Enemy (2013). Documentary Feature Film

Director: Jaime Otero

- El Perfecto Desconocido (2011). Feature Film

Director: Toni Bestard

- Quédate Conmigo (2010). Short 35 mm

Director: Zoé Berriatúa

- Duelo (2010). Short 35 mm

Director: Víctor Pedreira

- Dito, el niño despertador (2008). Short 35 mm

Director: Miguel Yusty

- Vámonos de aquí (2008). Short 35 mm

Director: Nydia García Vacas

- Intrusos (en Manasés) (2007). Feature Film

Director: Juan Carlos Claver

- Luces (2007). Animation Short 35 mm

Director: Miguel Yusty

- Equipajes (2006). Short 35 mm

Director: Toni Bestard

- La pelota vasca en Madrid (2006). Short

Director: Jorge Barrau

- Electroshock (2005). TV-Movie

Director: Juan Carlos Claver

- El Perro Ambicioso (2005). Animation Short 35 mm

Director: Miguel Yusty

- El Cruce (2004). TV-Movie

Director: Juan Carlos Claver

- Niño Vudú (2004). Short 35 mm

Director: Toni Bestard

- El Túnel (2004). Video-art

Director: Daniel Román

- El Viaje (2002). Short 35 mm

Director: Toni Bestard

- Gatos (2001). Short 35 mm

Director: Toni Bestard y Adán Martín

- Anagnórisis (2001). Short

Director: Daniel Román

- Sólo por un tango (2000). Short 35 mm

Director: Toni Bestard y Adán Martín

- Luz de Inocencia (2000). Short 35 mm

Director: Isidro Carbajal

- Die Grünne Dattel (1999). Short 16 mm

Director: Toni Bestard y Adán Martín

- Macho Wells (1998). Short

Director: Carlos Manrique

- Versos y Tabúes (1993). Short

Director: Carlos Manrique

== Discography ==
- 2017 A Common Enemy, Soundtrack of the movie / CD Rosetta Records
- 2017 Chamber Music, CD Naxos
- 2017 Spirit of Nature, Soundtrack / CD Mousiké
- 2015 Integral de la Obra para Arpa dedicada a Mª Rosa Calvo-Manzano, CD Arlu Discos
- 2013 La Perfecta Desconocida, Soundtrack / CD Karonte
- 2012 El Perfecto Desconocido, Soundtrack of the movie / CD Karonte
- 2011 Dos princesas and Bacantes in "Dúos para flauta y arpa españoles contemporáneos", CD Arlu Discos
- 2010 Intrusos en Manasés, Soundtrack of the movie / CD Mousiké
- 2009 Electroshock, Soundtrack of the movie / CD Mousiké
- 2008 Ludus Ludovico and Sonata para flauta, violoncello y arpa in "El arpa en la música de cámara española contemporánea", CD Arlu Discos
- 2008 Music for Shortfilms, compilation CD / CD Mousiké
- 2007 Ménades, para orquesta de cámara in "XVI-XVII PREMIO SGAE Jóvenes Compositores", CD Fundación Autor

== Books published ==
- 2017 Análisis Musivisual, guía de audición y estudio de la música cinematográfica. Editorial Visión Libros, Madrid
- 2008 El Lenguaje Musivisual, semiótica y estética de la música cinematográfica, Editorial Visión Libros, Madrid
- 2008 Indeterminación y minimalismo, pop y vanguardias, Lulu
- 2008 Manuel de Falla y la filosofía española, Lulu

== Articles ==
- 2009 Estética de la música cinematográfica, aspectos differenciadores, in "Reflexiones en torno a la música y la imagen desde la musicología española", edition by Matilde Olarte, Salamanca
- 2009 Enseñanza de la música de cine en España, in the magazine "Música y Educación", number 78, year XXII
- 2007 Cine, Música, Arquitectura. Ejercicio Interdisciplinar de percepción del espacio y memoria auditiva, in "Experiencias de innovación docente en la Universidad de Alcalá", Universidad de Alcalá, Alcalá de Henares (Madrid)

== See also ==
- Musivisual Language
- Analysis Musivisual
