= Musivisual language =

In art, musivisual language is a semiotic system that is the synchronous union of music and image. The term was coined by Spanish composer Alejandro Román, and for over a century, has appeared in film and other media (television, video or multimedia).

== Definition ==
According to Román:

Musivisual Language is a special language of music placed in film and from film, understood not only from structural point of view, rhythm and sound-material, but also from the relationships and meaning semiotics in relation to the close interaction with the image and plot.

— Román, 2008: 84

When film music and text connect, they produce meanings distinct from the separate elements. In this communication process, musical codes (melody, rhythm, harmony, sound, texture, form), in synchrony with the film (image, speech, noise...) interact.

Román defines two levels for this language: semiotic, i.e. the contribution of meaning of music over the image, and the specific aesthetic of film music, which means it has its own stylistic elements not belonging to other musical forms. These elements are determined by the cinematic form.

== See also ==
- Solresol
- Language
- Semiotics
- Aesthetics
- Film score
- Alejandro Román
- Visual language

== Bibliography ==
- Arijon, Daniel, Gramática del Lenguaje Audiovisual, La Primitiva Casa Baroja, San Sebastián, 1976
- Chion, Michel, La audiovisión. Introducción a un análisis conjunto de la imagen y el sonido, Paidós Comunicación, Barcelona, 1993
- Gértrudix Barrio, Manuel. Música y narración en los medios audiovisuales, Ediciones del Laberinto, S.L., Madrid, 2003
- Olarte Martínez, Matilde (editora), La música en los Medios Audiovisuales, Plaza Universitaria Ediciones, Salamanca, 2005
- Román, Alejandro, El Lenguaje Musivisual, semiótica y estética de la música cinematográfica, Editorial Visión Libros, Madrid, 2008
- Román, Alejandro, Estética de la música cinematográfica, aspectos diferenciadores, en Matilde Olarte Martínez (editora), Reflexiones en torno a la música y la imagen desde la musicología española, Plaza Universitaria Ediciones, Salamanca, 2009
