= Symphony No. 4 (Prieto) =

The 4th Symphony "Martín y Soler" of Claudio Prieto was composed in 2006 as a commission by the Orquesta de Valencia, which premiered the work on February 23, 2007 with conductor Antoni Ros-Marbà.

The symphony is made up of a single 50' long movement and was composed as a tribute to Valencian composer Vicente Martín y Soler, evoking his time's aesthetic while raising Prieto's personal view of the projection of his figure, both in artistic and biographic terms.
