= International Ettore Pozzoli Piano Competition =

The International Ettore Pozzoli Piano Competition is a piano competition. It has been held in Seregno, Italy since 1959 every two years.

== History ==
The contest was founded by Gina Gambini, widow of the Italian pianist, Ettore Pozzoli, wishing to honour the memory of her husband by giving musicians from all over the world an opportunity to show their artistic skills. Up to now, more than 1.500 pianists coming from all over the world have participated in the 25 editions of the competition that has taken place in the city in northern Italy. In 1959, the first pianist to win the International Ettore Pozzoli Piano Competition was Maurizio Pollini. The last edition (XXVI°) took place in September 2009, celebrating the 50th year of the Competition foundation and was won by young American pianist Christopher Falzone.

== Prize winners ==
1959	1st prize	2nd prize (ex-a.)
	(Italy) Maurizio Pollini	(Italy) Gino Brandi
		(Italy) Wally Rizzardo
1961	1st prize (ex-a.)	2nd prize
	(Italy) Pier Narciso Masi	France Redon
	(Italy) Fabio Peressoni	
1963	1st prize	2nd Prize
	(Italy) Laura De Fusco	(Italy) Alberto Colombo
1965	1st prize	2nd prize (ex-a.)
	(France) François-Joël Thiollier	(Japan) Yoshiya Iwamoto
		(Italy) Riccardo Risaliti
1967	1st prize	2nd prize (ex-a.)
	not awarded	(West Germany) Speidel Sontraud
		(Poland) Ewa Wolak
1969	1st prize	2nd prize
	(Italy) Franco Angeleri	(Italy) Antonio Bacchelli
	(Italy) Anna Maria Cigola	
1971	1st prize	2nd prize (ex-a.)
	(France) Pierre Réach	(Italy) Vincenzo Balzani
		(Japan) Tajka Hiroshi
1973	1st prize	2nd prize (ex-a.)
	(Italy) Raimondo Campisi	(Italy) Noemi Gobbi
		(West Germany) Michael Krist
1975	1st prize	2nd prize (ex-a.)
	(Argentina) Daniel Rivera	(Soviet Union) Boris Bloch
		(Italy) Roberto Cappello
1977	1st prize	2nd prize
	(Italy) Pietro Rigacci	(France) Elisabeth Rigollet
1979	1st prize	2nd prize
	(West Germany) Rolf Plagge	(Italy) Giovanni Umberto Battel
1981	1st prize	2nd prize (ex-a.)
	(Turkey) Hüseyin Sermet	(United Kingdom) Barry Douglas
		(Japan) Megumi Umene
1983	1st prize	2nd prize
	(Republic of Ireland) Hugh Tinney	(Soviet Union) (United States) Boris Slutsky
1985	1st prize	2nd prize
	(Hungary) Klára Würtz	(Bulgaria) Mariana Gurkova
1987	1st prize	2nd prize
	(Japan) Seizo Azuma	not awarded
1989	1st prize	2nd prize
	(United Kingdom) William Stephenson	(United Kingdom) Andrew Wilde
1991	1st prize	2nd prize
	not awarded	(Bulgaria) Anna Emilova Stoytcheva
1993	1st prize	2nd prize
	(Azerbaijan) Maria Stembolskaya	(Russia) Sergei Yerokhin
1995	1st prize	2nd prize
	not awarded	(Russia) Dmitri Krivonos
1997	1st prize	2nd prize
	not awarded	(Italy) Paolo Wolfango Cremonte
1999	1st prize	2nd prize
	(Italy) Filippo Gamba	(Italy) Lorenzo Di Bella
2001	1st prize	2nd prize
	not awarded	(Ukraine) Denys Proshayev
2003	1st prize	2nd prize
	not awarded	(Japan) Fumio Kawamura
2005	1st prize	2nd prize
	(United Kingdom) Martin Cousin	(South Korea) Yoonjung Han
2007	1st prize	2nd prize
	(Russia) Alexandre Pirojenko	(Ukraine) (Israel) Victor Stanislavsky
2009	1st prize	2nd prize
	(United States) Christopher Falzone	(Italy) Domenico Monaco
2011	1st prize	2nd prize
	(Russia) Alexey Chernov	(Russia) Alexander Yakovlev
2015	1st prize(ex-a.)	2nd prize
	(Canada) Anastasia Rizikov	not awarded
	(Japan) Yoshito Numasawa	
2017	1st prize	2nd prize
	not awarded	(Italy) Axel Trolese
		(Russia) Elizaveta Kliuchereva
2019	1st prize	2nd prize (ex-a.)
	(Russia) Evgeny Konnov	(Russia) Andrei Leshkin
		(Italy) Elia Cecino
2021	1st prize	2nd prize (ex-a.)
	not awarded	(Japan) Yuto Takezawa
		(Italy) Diego Petrella
2023	1st prize	2nd prize (ex-a.)
	not awarded	(Russia) Vladimir Skomorokhov
		(Japan) Riito Shimata
2025	1st prize	2nd prize
	(China) Rui Ming	(Italy) Michelle Candotti

== See also ==
- List of classical music competitions
- World Federation of International Music Competitions
