= Carlo Villa (footballer) =

Italian footballer (1912–?)

Personal information
- Date of birth: 28 May 1912
- Place of birth: Seregno, Italy
- Position: Midfielder

Senior career*
Years	Team	Apps	(Gls)
1931–1936	Seregno		
1936–1937	Ambrosiana-Inter	23	(1)
1937–1941	Genova 1893	51	(0)
1941–1943	Novara	49	(2)
1944–1945	Milano	14	(0)
1945–1946	Novara	19	(0)
- * Club domestic league appearances and goals

Carlo Villa (28 May 1912 – ?) was an Italian professional footballer who played as a midfielder. He played in Serie A and in the Coppa Italia, spending four seasons with Genoa.
