= Julia Tsenova =

Bulgarian composer (1948–2010)

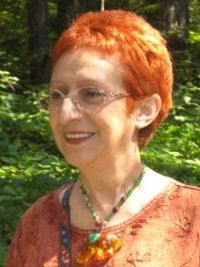
- Prof. Julia Tsenova in 2008

Background information
- Born: July 30, 1948; Sofia, Bulgaria
- Died: 11 April 2010 (aged 61)
- Occupations: Composer, Pianist

Julia Tsenova (also spelled Julia Tzenova, Julia Cenova, or Julia Zenova, Bulgarian: Юлия Ценова) (July 30, 1948 – April 11, 2010) was a Bulgarian composer, pianist and musical pedagogue.

== Life and career ==
Julia Tsenova graduated in both Composition and Piano from the State Academy of Music in Sofia as a student of Prof. Pancho Vladigerov. Tsenova took part in the International Composers' class in Sofia and Amsterdam, directed by Prof. Ton de Leeuw - the Netherlands (1981, 1982). She attended many workshops in Europe. Her music was performed in different contemporary festivals, as well as at the International Composers' Rostrum in Paris (1995). Since 1997 she was Professor of Piano and Dean at the Pop and Jazz Music Faculty in the State Academy of Music. She was a member of the Union of the Bulgarian Composers as well as of the International Society for Contemporary Music, and a President of the Bulgarian section. Julia Tsenova died on 11 April 2010.

Her daughter Kristina Sandulova is also a concert pianist.

=== Music ===
Julia Tsenova has had versatile musical interests. She wrote various pieces of symphonic, chamber, choral and scenic music. Her works have been described as expressive and rich.

Tsenova has always had a strong interest in the ancient eastern philosophies - this interest finds its own secret ways to penetrate in the creative ideas of the composer. Traces of this trend can be found in her latest works as well.

Her compositions have been performed in different musical forums in Bulgaria, Austria, Switzerland, England, Ireland, Germany, France, Italy, Spain, Netherlands, Norway, Poland, Czech Republic, Slovakia, Hungary, Romania, Greece, Russia, India, Australia, United States, Canada and other countries.

=== Personal life ===
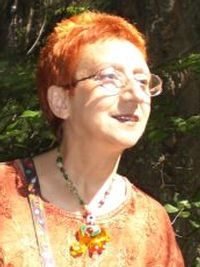
Prof. Julia Tsenova

In 2002 Bulgarian National Television produced a documentary entitled Prayers onto the Wall devoted to Julia Tsenova and her works.

She died of cancer on April 11, 2010, in Sofia, and is buried in Central Sofia Cemetery.

== Selected works ==
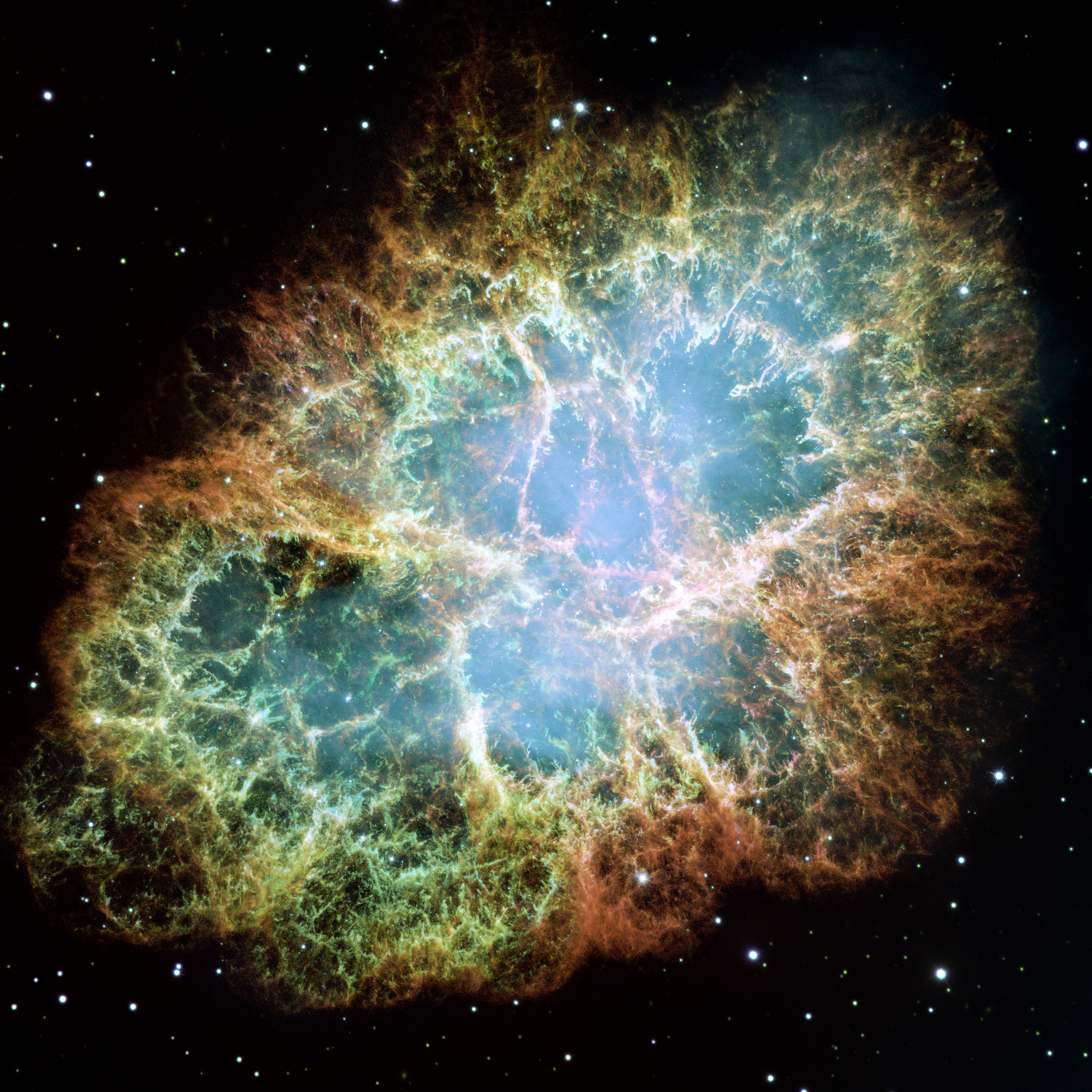
"The endless circle" is dedicated to the Crab Nebula

=== Symphonic ===
- 1974 Sinfonia con piano concertante
- 1979 Movement for orchestra
- 1984 Fest music - for orchestra
- 1994 Fresco - for chamber choir and orchestra
- 2000 Suggestion - for orchestra
- 2001 Shopp Dance

=== Chamber ===
- 1973 Three Indian songs - solo contralto
- 1975 Seven songs - for soprano and string quintet
- 1976 Three Frescoes with Epilogue for viola and piano
- 1981 Step and Rag-Time for viola and piano
- 1985 Music for the mice - Fl, Cl, Fg
- 1986 Music in the entr'acte - Pn, Vla, Cb, tape effects
- 1987 Cantus Firmus a due - Cl, Pn, Marimba
- 1990 Diving in the poles - for seven voices (4+3)
- 1993 The water sends me to sleep - Pn, Cl, Vibraphone and sound effects
- 1995 The endless circle - Pn, String quintet, Fl, Cr
- 1996 Temptation - Chamber opera - musical
- 1996 Triptych for Keyboard - Pn
- 1996 ...Invoking the gods - Altoflute in G + Mexican sistrum, Piano + Mexican drum, Cbass + log drum
- 1997 Musica solitudinis - Pn
- 1997 A swan song - for female - voice folk choir
- 1997 An album of jazz pieces for piano
- 1998 Shop dance - a piece for piano four handed
- 1998 = 3.14 - for voice and chamber orchestra
- 1998 Isida's unveiling - alt saxofone + easy piano, trumpet and audio amplifier and loudspeaker system
- 1999 Four prayers - Pn
- 2000 Green silence - Fl, Vla, harp and piano
- 2001 The seventh door - Fl, Cl, Vno, Vc, Pn
- 2001 A Song Cycle - for Soprano and Piano /on Ingeborg Bachmann's poetry/
- 2002 Quantum Satis - for female folk choir, 2 Pn, Gong and cassa
- 2002 Temple of the Dancers - 3 Fl /1 solo + 2/
- 2003 Metamorphoses - for piano four handed
- 2003 String Quartet
- 2003 Curriculum Vitae - on I. Bachmann for soprano and piano
- 2004 The Left Dragon - for oboe solo
