= François-Joël Thiollier =

French-American classical pianist

François-Joël Thiollier (born 1943) is an internationally recognized French-American classical pianist.

Thiollier was born in Paris in 1943, with both French and American citizenship. He gave his first concert in New York City at the age of 5, then commenced studies at the Paris Conservatoire with Robert Casadesus, and at the Juilliard School in New York under Sascha Gorodnitzki, graduating at the young age of eighteen.

He has won major prizes at international music competitions, including 1st Prize at the 1965 Ettore Pozzoli Competition, 2nd Prize at the 1964 Busoni Competition (the winner was Michael Ponti), and 6th Prizes at the 1966 Tchaikovsky Competition in Moscow and the 1968 Queen Elisabeth Competition in Belgium.

He has concertised very widely in over 40 countries, and has made a large number of well-received recordings, including the complete piano works of Rachmaninoff (two traversals), Debussy, Ravel and Gershwin. He has also recorded Busoni's massive Piano Concerto with chorus.

François-Joël Thiollier was appointed an Officier of the Ordre des Arts et des Lettres in 2003.

He was a jury member for the Paloma O'Shea Santander International Piano Competition (1987), and the Concours de Genève International Music Competition (2012). He is also Chairman of the Jury for the inaugural "Città di Acquaviva delle Fonti" - "Giovanni Colafemmina" Prize Piano Competition. He has participated in numerous other music competition juries.

He resides in Italy with his family.
