= Daniel Rivera =

Argentine pianist settled in Italy (born 1952)

Héctor Alejandro Daniel Rivera (born May 17, 1952 in Rosario, Santa Fe) is an Argentine pianist settled in Italy. He was awarded prizes at the 1973 Vincenzo Scaramuzza Competition in Buenos Aires (1st), 1974 Rina Sala Gallo, Monza (1st), 1974 Alessandro Casagrande, Terni (3rd), 1976 Concorso Busoni (2nd), 1975 International Ettore Pozzoli Piano Competition (1st), 1977 Cata Monti Competition, Trieste (1st), Dino Ciani Competition (2nd), 1981 Beethoven Competition in Vienna (3rd), 1984 Paloma O'Shea Competition (5th), and a special prize at the Liszt-Bartók Competition in Budapest.

Selected performance venues: Teatro Colón, Musikverein, National Philharmonic Society of Ukraine, Queen Elizabeth Hall.
