= Pozzoli =

Pozzoli is an Italian surname. Notable people with the surname include:

- Ettore Pozzoli (1873–1957), Italian classical pianist and composer
- Silver Pozzoli (born 1953), Italian singer, songwriter, and musician
