= Claudio Prieto =

Spanish composer (1934–2015)

Claudio Prieto (24 November 1934 – 5 April 2015) was a Spanish composer. He was born in Muñeca de la Peña, Palencia, and began his musical career as a boy in the mid-20th century playing various musical instruments for the municipal band of Guardo. He moved to San Lorenzo de El Escorial when he was 16 years, where he began his education with the musicologist Samuel Rubio.

In 1960 he obtained a cultural exchange scholarship from the Spanish Ministry of Foreign Affairs admitting him to the advanced course taught in the Accademia Nazionale di Santa Cecilia in Rome. Over the next three years, he studied under Goffredo Petrassi, Bruno Maderna and Boris Porena. After completing the training he received a Higher Diploma from the academy and returned to Spain. In 1967, he participated in the Darmstadt International Summer Courses for New Music (Germany) with among others, György Ligeti, Karlheinz Stockhausen and Earle Brown.

His professional career began in Madrid with the premiere at the Ateneo Auditorium of his work Improvisation for chamber ensemble. In 1969 his piece "Solo a Solo", for flute and guitar, won him "Best Spanish Work for Young Musicians Award” and thereby national and international exposure and recognition. His 4th Symphony was commissioned by the Valencia Orchestra in 2006 and composed as a tribute to Valencian composer Vicente Martín y Soler.

Prieto died on 5 April 2015 in Madrid, aged 80.

== Legacy ==
His biography, Música, belleza y comunicación, was written by Víctor Pliego de Andrés and published by Editorial Complutense in 1994.

In Guardo, a secondary school bears his name (Instituto de Educación Secundaria (IES) Claudio Prieto).
