= Klára Würtz =

Hungarian classical pianist (born 1965)

- Born: 1965 (age 60–61); Budapest, Hungary
- Education: Franz Liszt Academy of Music
- Occupation: Pianist

Klára Würtz (born 1965) is a Hungarian classical pianist.

== Biography ==
Würtz was born in Budapest, Hungary, in 1965. She studied at the Franz Liszt Academy of Music. She won the International Ettore Pozzoli Piano Competition in 1985 and the Dublin International Piano Competition in 1988. In 1991, she signed with Columbia Artists Management and embarked on a tour across North America. She has performed at venues such as Carnegie Hall, the Kennedy Center, and the Ravinia Festival. Würtz has also released a number of studio recordings, including recordings of works by Mozart, Schubert, Schumann, Chopin, Liszt, Debussy, and Rachmaninoff.

== Personal life ==
As of 2025, Würtz lives in Amsterdam with her husband and daughter.

== Discography ==
- Schumann – Piano Works Vol. 1 (Brilliant Classics, 2002)
- Romantic Piano Music (Brilliant Classics, 2005)
- Schubert – Piano Sonata in B flat D960; Piano Sonata in A D664 (Piano Classics, 2014)
- Bach – Goldberg Variations (Piano Classics, 2022)
- Celebration (Brilliant Classics, 2025)
