= Ettore Pozzoli =

Ettore Pozzoli (July 23, 1873 – November 9, 1957) was an Italian classical pianist and composer.

== Biography ==
Born in the Italian city of Seregno, Ettore Pozzoli began his career soon after he received his music diploma from the Milan Conservatory in 1895. While writing music for piano and orchestra, he started teaching at the Milan Conservatory.

His works on theory and solfeggio, even nowadays considered the basis of the studies of any pianist, are known for the progressive difficulty, for harmony and counterpoint.

His composition, Danza fantastica, was chosen in 1956 as the compulsory piece for competitors at the sixth World Accordion Contest in Gdańsk.

Pozzoli died on 9 November 1957 in Seregno (Italy), where, since 1959, an international piano contest in his honour takes place organized by the city.

== Repertoire and technique ==
- 16 Studi di agilità per le piccole mani
- I primi esercizi di stile polifonico
- La tecnica giornaliera del pianista, Casa Ricordi, Milano, 1927
- Studi di Media Difficoltà per Pianoforte
- Studi a moto rapido per Pianoforte
- Sorrisi infantili
- Metodo d'armonia, Casa Ricordi, Milano, 1946–1975, ISMN M-041-82225-9
- Solfeggi parlati e cantati, Casa Ricordi, Milano
- Sunto di Teoria musicale - I, II, III Corso, Casa Ricordi, Milano.

== International Ettore Pozzoli Piano Competition ==
The International Ettore Pozzoli Piano Competition, for tradition and amount of prize, is one of the oldest and most prestigious piano competitions in the world, taking place in Seregno, Italy, since 1959 and held every 2 years.
