= Visual language =

System of communication using visual elements

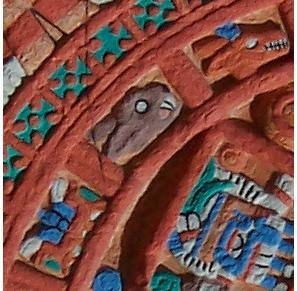
Water, rabbit, deer pictographs on a replica of an Aztec Stone of the Sun.

A visual language is a system of communication using visual elements. Speech as a means of communication cannot strictly be separated from the whole of human communicative activity which includes the visual and the term 'language' in relation to vision is an extension of its use to describe the perception, comprehension and production of visible signs.

== Overview ==
An image which dramatizes and communicates an idea presupposes the use of a visual language. Just as people can 'verbalize' their thinking, they can 'visualize' it. A diagram, a map, and a painting are all examples of uses of visual language. Its structural units include line, shape, colour, form, motion, texture, pattern, direction, orientation, scale, angle, space and proportion.

The elements in an image represent concepts in a spatial context, rather than the linear form used for words. Speech and visual communication are parallel and often interdependent means by which humans exchange information.

== Visual language ==
Visual units in the form of lines and marks are constructed into meaningful shapes and structures or signs. Different areas of the cortex respond to different elements such as colour and form. Semir Zeki has shown the responses in the brain to the paintings of Michelangelo, Rembrandt, Vermeer, Magritte, Malevich and Picasso.

=== Imaging in the mind ===
What we have in our minds in a waking state and what we imagine in dreams is very much of the same nature. Dream images might be with or without spoken words, other sounds or colours. In the waking state there is usually, in the foreground, the buzz of immediate perception, feeling, mood and as well as fleeting memory images. In a mental state between dreaming and being fully awake is a state known as 'day dreaming' or a meditative state, during which "the things we see in the sky when the clouds are drifting, the centaurs and stags, antelopes and wolves" are projected from the imagination. Rudolf Arnheim has attempted to answer the question: what does a mental image look like? In Greek philosophy, the School of Leucippus and Democritus believed that a replica of an object enters the eye and remains in the soul as a memory as a complete image. Berkeley explained that parts, for example, a leg rather than the complete body, can be brought visually to the mind. Arnheim considers the psychologist, Edward B. Titchener's account to be the breakthrough in understanding something of how the vague incomplete quality of the image is 'impressionistic' and carries meaning as well as form.

=== Meaning and expression ===
Abstract art has shown that the qualities of line and shape, proportion and colour convey meaning directly without the use of words or pictorial representation. Wassily Kandinsky showed how drawn lines and marks can be expressive without any association with a representational image. From the most ancient cultures and throughout history visual language has been used to encode meaning: "The Bronze Age Badger Stone on Ilkly Moor is covered in circles, lines, hollow cups, winged figures, a spread hand, an ancient swastika, an embryo, a shooting star? … It's a story-telling rock, a message from a world before (written) words." Richard Gregory suggests that, "Perhaps the ability to respond to absent imaginary situations," as our early ancestors did with paintings on rock, "represents an essential step towards the development of abstract thought."

=== Perception ===
The sense of sight operates selectively. Perception is not a passive recording of all that is in front of the eyes, but is a continuous judgement of scale and colour relationships, and includes making categories of forms to classify images and shapes in the world. Children of six to twelve months are to be able through experience and learning to discriminate between circles, squares and triangles. The child from this age onwards learns to classify objects, abstracting essential qualities and comparing them to other similar objects. Before objects can be perceived and identified the child must be able to classify the different shapes and sizes that a single object may appear to have when it is seen in varying surroundings and from different aspects.

=== Innate structures in the brain ===
The perception of a shape requires the grasping of the essential structural features, to produce a "whole" or gestalt. The theory of the gestalt was proposed by Christian von Ehrenfels in 1890. He pointed out that a melody is still recognisable when played in different keys and argued that the whole is not simply the sum of its parts but a total structure. Max Wertheimer researched von Ehrenfels' idea, and in his "Theory of Form" (1923) – nicknamed "the dot essay" because it was illustrated with abstract patterns of dots and lines – he concluded that the perceiving eye tends to bring together elements that look alike (similarity groupings) and will complete an incomplete form (object hypothesis). An array of random dots tends to form configurations (constellations). All these innate abilities demonstrate how the eye and the mind are seeking pattern and simple whole shapes. When we look at more complex visual images such as paintings we can see that art has been a continuous attempt to "notate" visual information.

=== Visual thinking ===
Thought processes are diffused and interconnected and are cognitive at a sensory level. The mind thinks at its deepest level in sense material, and the two hemispheres of the brain deal with different kinds of thought. The brain is divided into two hemispheres and a thick bundle of nerve fibres enable these two halves to communicate with each other. In most people the ability to organize and produce speech is predominantly located in the left side. Appreciating spatial perceptions depends more on the right hemisphere, although there is a left hemisphere contribution. In an attempt to understand how designers solve problems, L. Bruce Archer proposed "that the way designers (and everybody else, for that matter) form images in their mind's eye, manipulating and evaluating ideas before, during and after externalising them, constitutes a cognitive system comparable with but different from, the verbal language system. Indeed we believe that human beings have an innate capacity for cognitive modelling, and its expression through sketching, drawing, construction, acting out and so on, that is fundamental to human thought."

=== Art in education ===
The visual language begins to develop in babies as the eye and brain become able to focus, and be able to recognize patterns. Children's drawings show a process of increasing perceptual awareness and range of elements to express personal experience and ideas. The development of the visual aspect of language communication in education has been referred to as graphicacy, as a parallel discipline to literacy and numeracy. The ability to think and communicate in visual terms is part of, and of equal importance in the learning process, with that of literacy and numeracy. The visual artist, as Michael Twyman has pointed out, has developed the ability to handle the visual language to communicate ideas. This includes both the understanding and conception and the production of concepts in a visual form.

== See also ==
- Asemic writing
- Emoji
- Musivisual language
- Nocturne (painting)
- Nonverbal communication
- Pictogram
- Visual modeling
- Writing system
