= Seregno =

Seregno Seregn (Lombard)
- Comune
- Città di Seregno
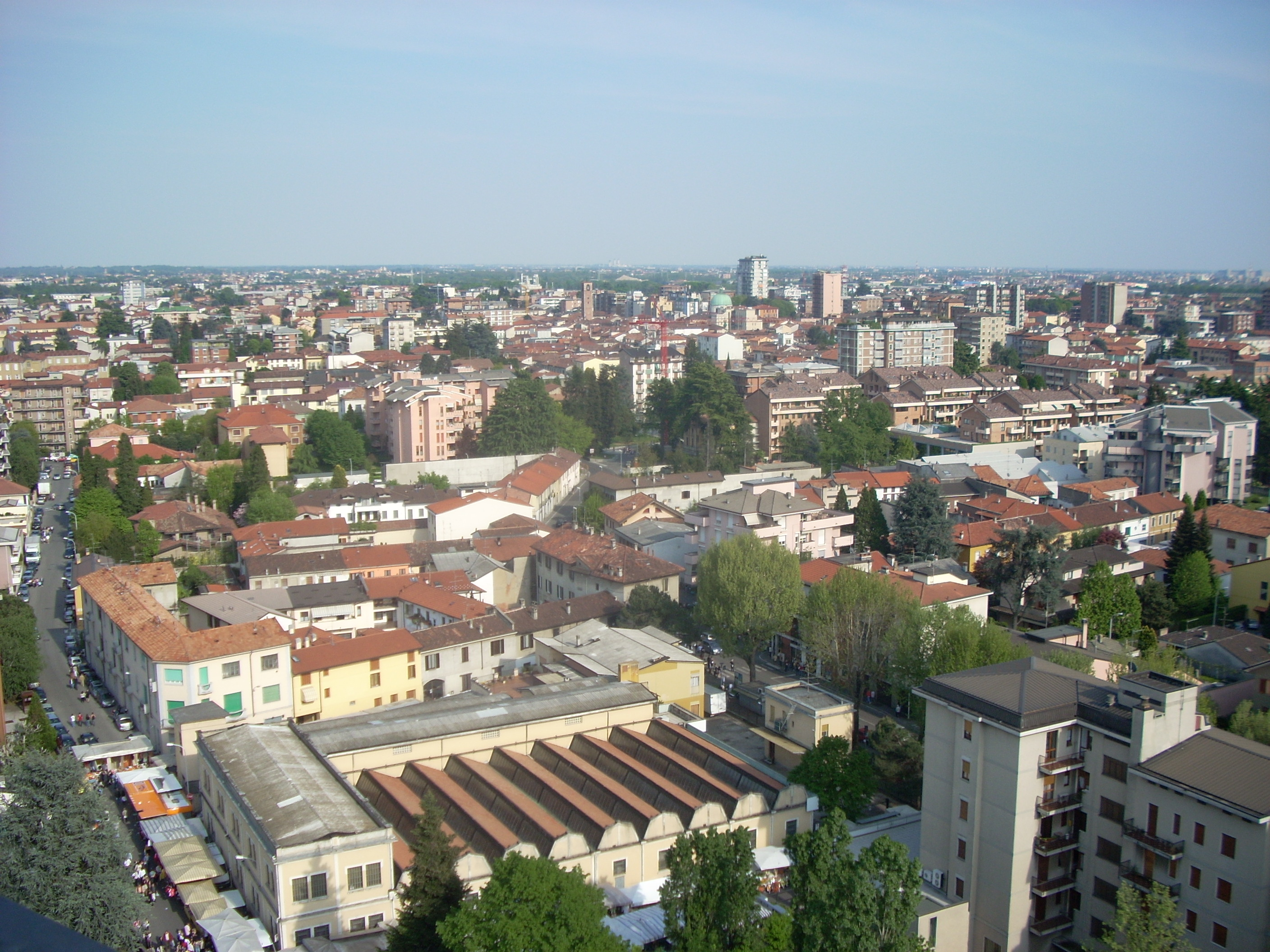

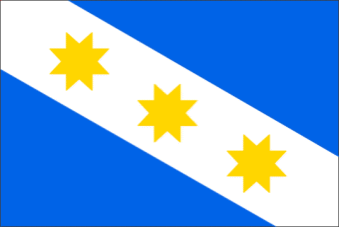
- Flag Coat of arms

- Location within Italy Location within Lombardy
- Coordinates: 45°39′N 9°12′E
- Country: Italy
- Region: Lombardy
- Province: Monza and Brianza (MB)
- Frazioni: Ceredo, San Carlo, Sant'Ambrogio, Santa Valeria, Lazzaretto, San Salvatore, Dosso, Meredo

Government
  - Mayor: Alberto Rossi

Area
  - Total: 13.01 km^{2} (5.02 sq mi)
- Elevation: 222 m (728 ft)

Population (30 November 2017)
  - Total: 45,189
  - Density: 3,473/km^{2} (8,996/sq mi)
- Demonym: Seregnesi
- Time zone: UTC+1 (CET)
  - Summer (DST): UTC+2 (CEST)
- Postal code: 20831
- Dialing code: 0362
- Patron saint: Saint Valeria
- Saint day: 28 April
- Website: Official website

Seregno (Italian pronunciation: [seˈreɲɲo]; Brianzoeu: Seregn [seˈrɛɲ]) is a town and comune of the new Province of Monza and Brianza in the Italian region of Lombardy. Seregno received the honorary title of city by a presidential decree on 26 January 1979.

It is served by Seregno railway station.

== Geography ==
The city is located in the upper part of the Lombard plain, 10 kilometres (6 mi) from Monza, only 20 kilometres (12 mi) from Milan, capital of the Region. The current infrastructure system, with two longitudinal bisecting roads and a thick mesh of provincial and municipal roads and railways also make Seregno very close to all the major attractions of the area such as the lake districts, the Alps, the cities of Como, Lecco, Bergamo and Varese.

== Main sights ==
- Saint Joseph's Basilica
- Landriani Caponaghi Palace, the current town hall
- Odescalchi Villa
- Barbarossa Tower

== Economy ==
Seregno is positioned in the middle of one of the most economically productive areas in Italy with a high concentration of small and medium-sized enterprises. The total number of companies listed in Seregno is over 3,600, equal to about 6 percent of companies throughout the Province of Monza and Brianza territory. Seregno has a long-established tradition in industrial and craft production with excellence in the furniture sector, engineering industry, clothing and computer industries.

A peculiarity of Seregno is the presence of a high number of bank branches in relation to the resident population and businesses located within the city boundaries.

== People ==
- Luca Caldirola, football player
- Igor Cassina, (1977), Olympic winner gymnast
- Piero Lissoni, architect and designer
- Roberto Mandressi, football player
- Marco Mapelli, racing driver
- Ettore Pozzoli, musician and pianist
- Carlo Villa, football player

== Culture ==
The International Ettore Pozzoli Piano Competition, for tradition and amount of prize, is one of the oldest and most prestigious piano competitions in the world taking place in Seregno, Italy since 1959 and held every two years.

== Sport ==
The Seregno football team is US 1913 Seregno Calcio, which plays in the Eccellenza

== Twin towns ==
Seregno is twinned with:

- Sant'Agata di Esaro, Italy

== Sources ==
- G. Ferrarini, A. Stadiotti, M. Stadiotti (a cura di). Seregno: Un paese, la sua storia, la sua anima. Telesio editrice, Carnate, 1999.
- E. Mariani. Storia di Seregno – Circolo Culturale Seregn de la memoria. Seregno, 1963.
- G. Picasso e M. Tagliabue (a cura di). Seregno. Una comunità di Brianza nella storia (secoli XI – XX) Comune di Seregno, Seregno, 1994.
