= Gabriel Fernández Álvez =

Spanish composer

Gabriel Fernández Álvez (Madrid, 9 July 1943 – Madrid, 2 February 2008) was a Spanish composer. He represented Spain at the I.S.M.E.'s XII Congress and the I.S.C.M.'s XII Congress.

== Selected works ==
- String Quartet No. 1 (1973)
- Hommage to Manuel de Falla (1976)
- Dioramas (1976)
- Concerto for 6 percussionists (1976)
- Hommage to Hindemith
- Lasciate ogni speranza, for soprano, treble, chorus, magnetic tape and orchestra
- Symphony No. 2 (1979)
- Oda for viola and piano (1984)
- Trío Mompou (1984)
- Lyric Phantasy for violin (1985)
- Cántico Matritense (1988)
- Fantasía (desde la lejana cercanía...) for guitar (1990)
- Elegiac Concerto for violin, cello, piano, chorus, 2 trumpets (among the audience), strings and percussion (1990)
- Sonata poética for guitar (1991)
- Gibraltar, opera (1992)
- Liturgia de cristal, 12 Preludes for guitar (1993)
- Concierto Seglar for saxophone and orchestra (1994)
- Violin Concerto (1996)
- La extraña flor de la melancolía, piano sonata (1996)
- Cuadernos para trío
- Concerto for 2 flutes and orchestra
- An-At, trio
- Getsemaní, oratorio (2000)
- Twelve Preludes for piano
- El Profeta, for barytone, chorus and orchestra (2006)
- Fantasía en blanco y negro for piano (2006)
- El poder de la imaginación, for trio (2006)
- Capriccio por trio and ensemble (2007)
