= Ilona Timchenko =

Russian pianist

Ilona Timchenko (born 1976) is a Russian pianist and composer based in O Pino, Spain.

Record of piano prizes
Year	Competition	Prize	Ex-aequo with...	1st prize winner	References
1995	(France) Épinal IPC	Medal		(Israel) Aviram Reichert	Épinal IPC
2000	(Spain) Cidade de Ferrol IPC	1st Prize			University of S. de Compostela
2001	(United Kingdom) Premio Jaén IPC	3rd Prize		(Spain) Javier Perianes	Premio Jaén IPC
2001	(Austria) Beethoven IPC, Vienna	Finalist		(Germany) Oliver Kern	University of S. de Compostela
2002	(Netherlands) Liszt IPC, Utrecht	2nd Prize		(France) Jean Dubé	Franz Liszt IPC
2003	(Romania) Enescu IMC, Bucharest	1st Prize			Alink-Argerich Foundation
2006	(Greece) Maria Callas IPC, Athens	3rd Prize		not awarded	idem
2007	(United Kingdom) Abstract Securities Landor	1st Prize	(United Kingdom) James Barralet		Landor Records
