= Zulema de la Cruz =

Spanish pianist and composer

- Born: Zulema de la Cruz Castillejo; March 9, 1958 (age 68); Madrid, Spain
- Occupations: Composer, musician

Zulema de la Cruz Castillejo (born 9 March 1958) is a Spanish pianist and composer.

== Life ==
Zulema de la Cruz was born in Madrid and studied at the Madrid Conservatory for piano and composition and Stanford University in California for composition and computer music, with professors including Carmelo Bernaola and Ramón Barce. She continued her studies at the Center for Computer Research in Music and Acoustics at Stanford University with John Chowning.

After completing her studies, she took a position as professor in Electroacoustic Composition at the Madrid Conservatory in 1988. She has also taught at the Cuenca Conservatory, the Carlos III University of Madrid, and others. She was instrumental in establishing and has served as director of the Research Laboratory for Computer and Electroacoustic Composition (LICEO) at the Madrid Conservatory.

De la Cruz has performed with Sax Ensemble since 1993, and also with Fundación Sax. She has also served as director of music festivals and on boards and advisory committees, including Consejo Nacional de La Música of the Spanish Ministry of Education and Culture. Her works have been performed internationally.

== Honors and awards ==
- Ruiz Morales competition
- Arpa de Oro competition
- Golden Harp competition VII
- Luis Coleman competition
- George Maile (USA) competition
- Ciatat D'Alcoy prize
- Premio Nacional de Música award, 1997
- Fourth Edition Music Award
- Best Classical Music Author from SGAE and Performers Association (IEA)

== Works ==
De la Cruz composes chamber, symphonic and electroacoustic music, both alone and in combination with classical instruments. Selected works include:

- Kinesis-2 for string quartet
- Concierto no. 1, Atlantico for piano and orchestra
- Danzas Galegas (Galician Dances) for viola solo (2003)
- La Luz del Aire for chamber ensemble
- Latir Isle for piano
- pulsars for piano and tape
- Soledad for string orchestra
- Evocación
- Latir Isleño for piano
- Nucleofonias
- Lorca Quintet for string quartet and solo guitar

Her works have been recorded and issued on media, including:

- Zulema de la Cruz Audio CD (March 29, 2005) Col Legno
- Solo Rumores Audio CD
- Weber & Rossini: Works for clarinet & piano Audio CD, Columno
