= Olga Kozlova =

Russian pianist (born 1986)

Olga Kozlova (Russian: Ольга Козлова; born 1986 in Penza, Russia) is a Russian pianist. She graduated from the Moscow Special Gnesin's School of Music in 2004 and is currently studying at the Moscow Conservatory.

She made it to the 2005 Frédéric Chopin International Piano Competition semi-finals, and has subsequently been awarded 2nd prizes at the 2008 Premio Jaén and Ricard Viñes competitions. Her discographical debut was a recording of Franz Liszt's Sonata coupled with Leo Weiner's orchestral arrangement of the work. On 9 April 2011 Olga Kozlova was awarded the Second Prize and the Press Prize of the 9th International Franz Liszt Piano Competition in Utrecht, The Netherlands.
