= Las Rozas de Madrid =

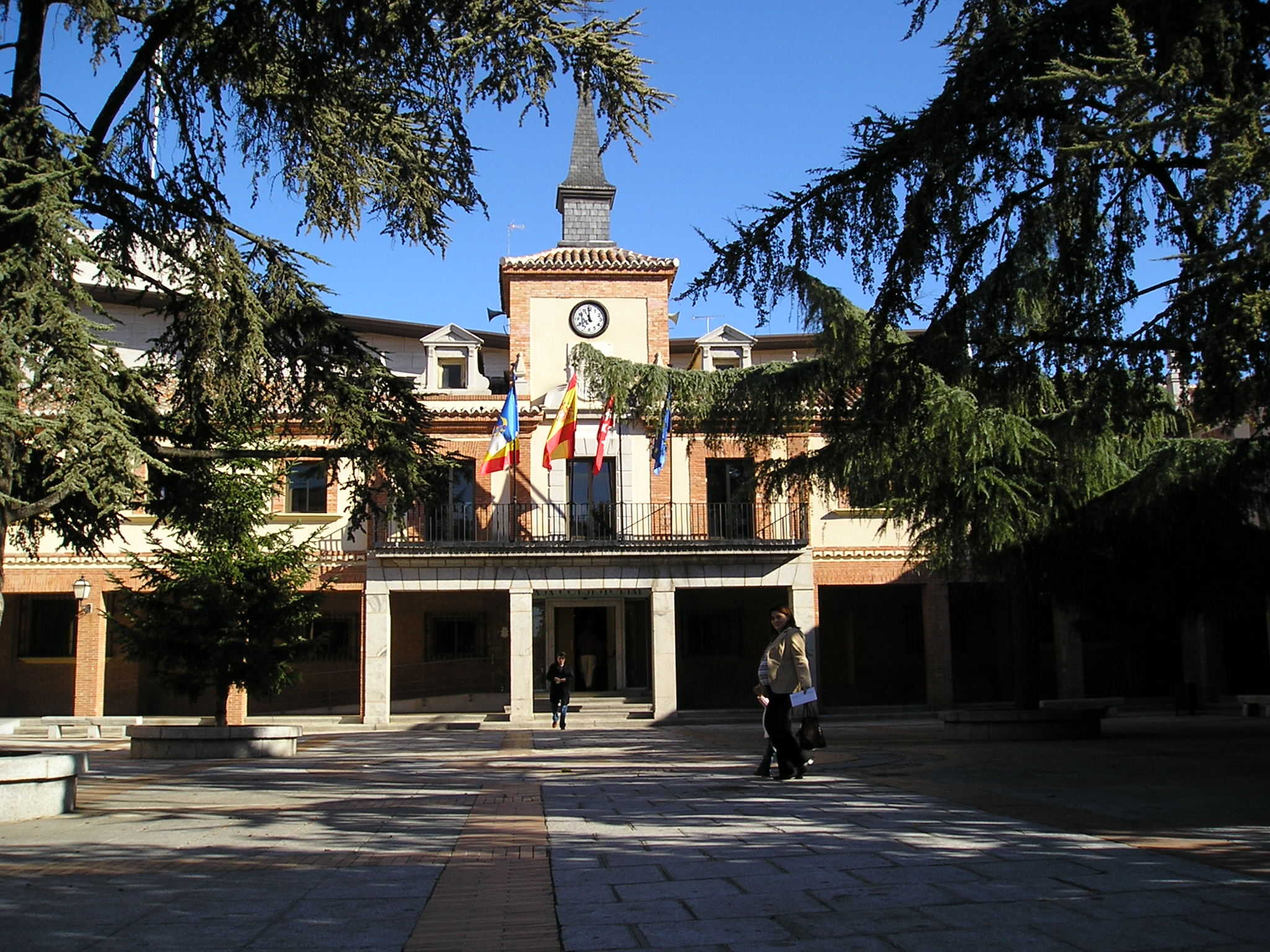
- Ayuntamiento (Town Hall) of Las Rozas

- Flag Coat of arms
- Interactive map of Las Rozas de Madrid
- Coordinates: 40°29′30″N 3°52′24″W
- Country: Spain
- Region: Community of Madrid

Government
  - Type: Ayuntamiento
  - Body: Ayuntamiento de Las Rozas de Madrid
  - Mayor: José de la Uz (PP)

Area
  - Total: 59.14 km^{2} (22.83 sq mi)
- Elevation: 718 m (2,356 ft)

Population (2025-01-01)
  - Total: 99,037
  - Rank: 1st
  - Density: 1,675/km^{2} (4,337/sq mi)
- Demonym(s): roceño (m), roceña (f)
- Time zone: UTC+1 (CET)
  - Summer (DST): UTC+2 (CEST)
- Postal codes in Spain: 28230 - 28231 - 28232 - 28290
- Area code: 34 (Spain) + 91 (Madrid)
- Patron Saint: San Miguel Arcángel
- Website: lasrozas.es
- Twinned with Granada and, Masaya, Nindirí, Villebon-sur-Yvette

Las Rozas de Madrid (Spanish: [las ˈɾoθas ðe maˈðɾið], or simply, Las Rozas [las ˈɾoθas]) is a municipality in the autonomous community of Madrid, Spain, with an area of 59 km² (22¾ sq. mi.).

The municipality is served by three Renfe railway stations– Las Rozas, Pinar de Las Rozas and Las Matas. Additional stops at Peñascales and El Tejar were closed. The municipality shares borders with Torrelodones to the north, Villanueva del Pardillo and Galapagar to the west, the park of Monte del Pardo in the east and Majadahonda (south).

Las Rozas has one of the highest average per capita incomes in the Madrid region, and it has become a right-wing stronghold.

During the final decades of the 20th century the town has experienced a vigorous building program, mostly as a dormitory town for Madrid, with a correspondingly strong population growth, which more than doubled between 1991 and 2005 (from 35,137 to 76,246 inhabitants).

== History ==
Rozas means clearings in Spanish. Various theories exist, for example: The clearing by Romans for military exercises, the collection of firewood or the creation of farmland. According to some historians Las Rozas could be the old Miacum, the name associated with the city of Madrid, dating from about the third century.

Las Rozas is situated near the river Guadarrama (which flows all year round) and along the ancient road between Segovia and Titulcia (two of the most ancient settlements in the area). The part of this ancient road near Las Rozas is now approximately the A6/M505 route.

During the Spanish civil war it became the site of major battles, a reminder of this time are the concrete forms of bunkers that remain in the Dehesa of Navalcarbón and along the valley of the river Guadarrama.

In the winter of 1936 the pro-Franco troops advanced for the west of Madrid from their bases at Brunete, Villaviciosa de Odón and Campamento. In the middle of a dense fog with freezing temperature, Franco's rebels, supported by the air force, engaged the republican forces in one of the bloodiest battles of the civil War. The inhabitants of Las Rozas took refuge in other places of the nearby Sierra (mountains) such as the caves in Hoyo de Manzanares. These roceños (inhabitants of Las Rozas) who fled were nicknamed cucos (the sly ones).

When the war was over, the Church of San Miguel and of the 270 houses of the (pre-war) settlement, 92 were severely damaged and only 13 were intact. The Ministerio de la Gobernación created the Dirección General de Regiones Devastadas for the reconstruction of towns destroyed by the war and Las Rozas was included among them.

== Transportation ==
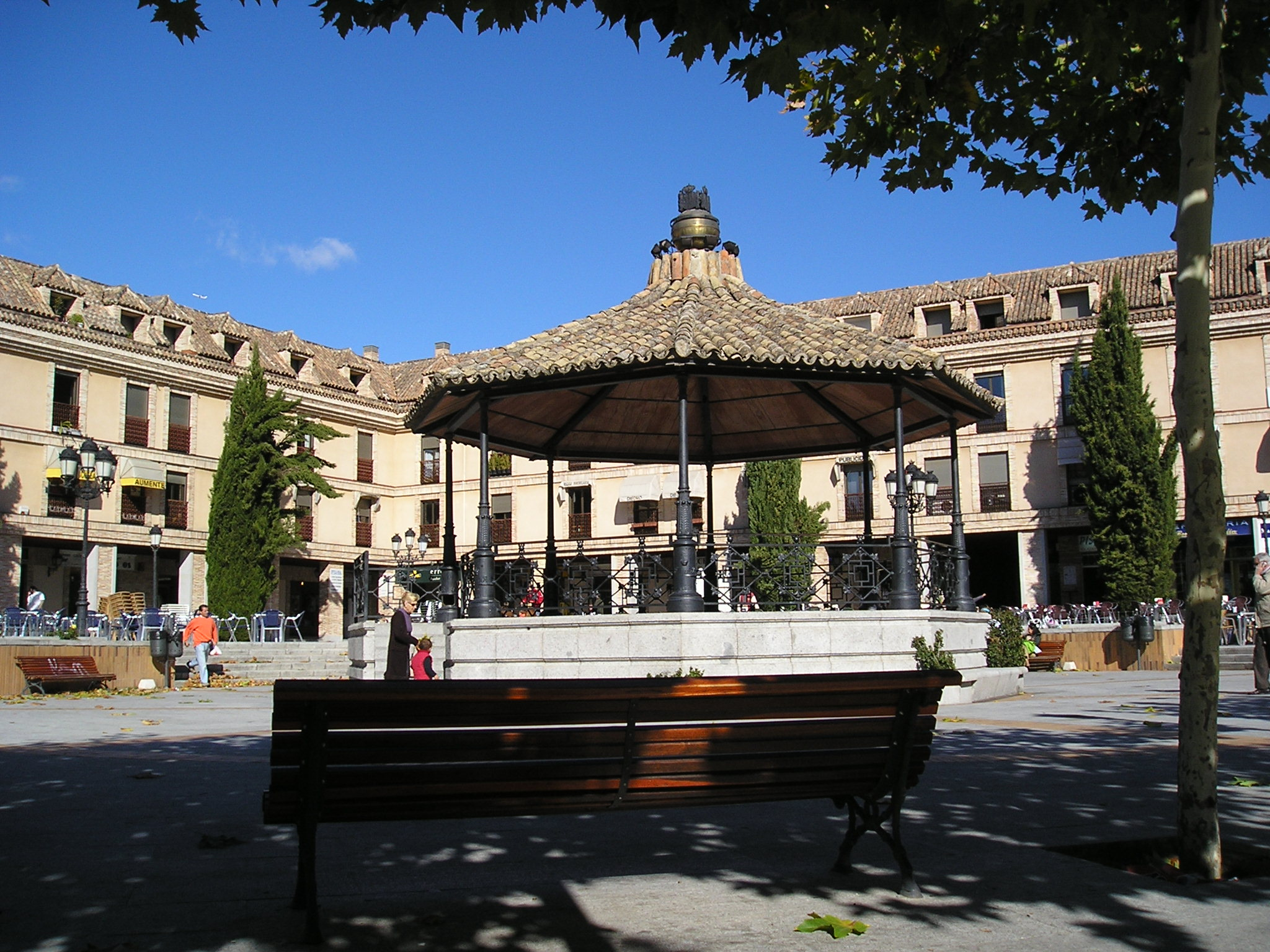
Plaza of Spain

Las Rozas can be reached from the Autopista del Noroeste (North-west Freeway) (Freeway that goes from Las Rozas to Adanero (Ávila)), from N-VI National Road from Madrid to A Coruña M-50 (third ring road around Madrid) and M-505 (County Road to El Escorial). This freeway is one of the first in Spain, put on service in early 1967. Then, 22 km (14 miles) from Las Rozas, to Northwest, in Collado Villalba, this freeway, become to Tollway.

There are 7 bus lines that connect the town with Moncloa (Madrid) 621, 624 (Burgo of Las Rozas), 622 (Las Matas), 623 (Villa Franca del Castillo), 625, 626, 628, 629 (new zones like the Business Park, La Dehesa and El Cantizal). There is also another bus line (561) that connects Las Rozas with Aluche (Madrid), passing through Majadahonda and Pozuelo de Alarcón.

Las Rozas has three main train stations: Las Rozas, near the Old Town in the south of the municipality, Las Matas in the North, and Pinar de Las Rozas. The Line 8 runs from Atocha in the south of Madrid and Chamartín in the north of Madrid via Pinar de Las Rozas and Las Matas to end-stations El Escorial and Cercedilla. Line 10 runs also runs from Atocha, but via a long circular route to Principe Pio in the west of Madrid via Las Rozas, Pinar and Las Matas to Villalba. A circular line (7) runs around Madrid serving Las Rozas. Additional stops at Los Peñascales (near Las Matas) and El Tejar were suppressed entirely.

There is a project proposal to encourage ecologically sustainable transport, especially of electrical scooters, entitled Las Rozas: la Capital Verde del Noroeste de Madrid which suggests either El Pinar or Las Matas should have a park and Ride facility providing access to major retailers in the municipality as well as commuter links to Madrid city. The nearby autovía A-6 is regularly congested at an accident blackspot about "Km 16" (near Majadahonda) some 5 km (3 miles) south of Las Rozas (which is at "Km 22" from Madrid).

== Culture ==
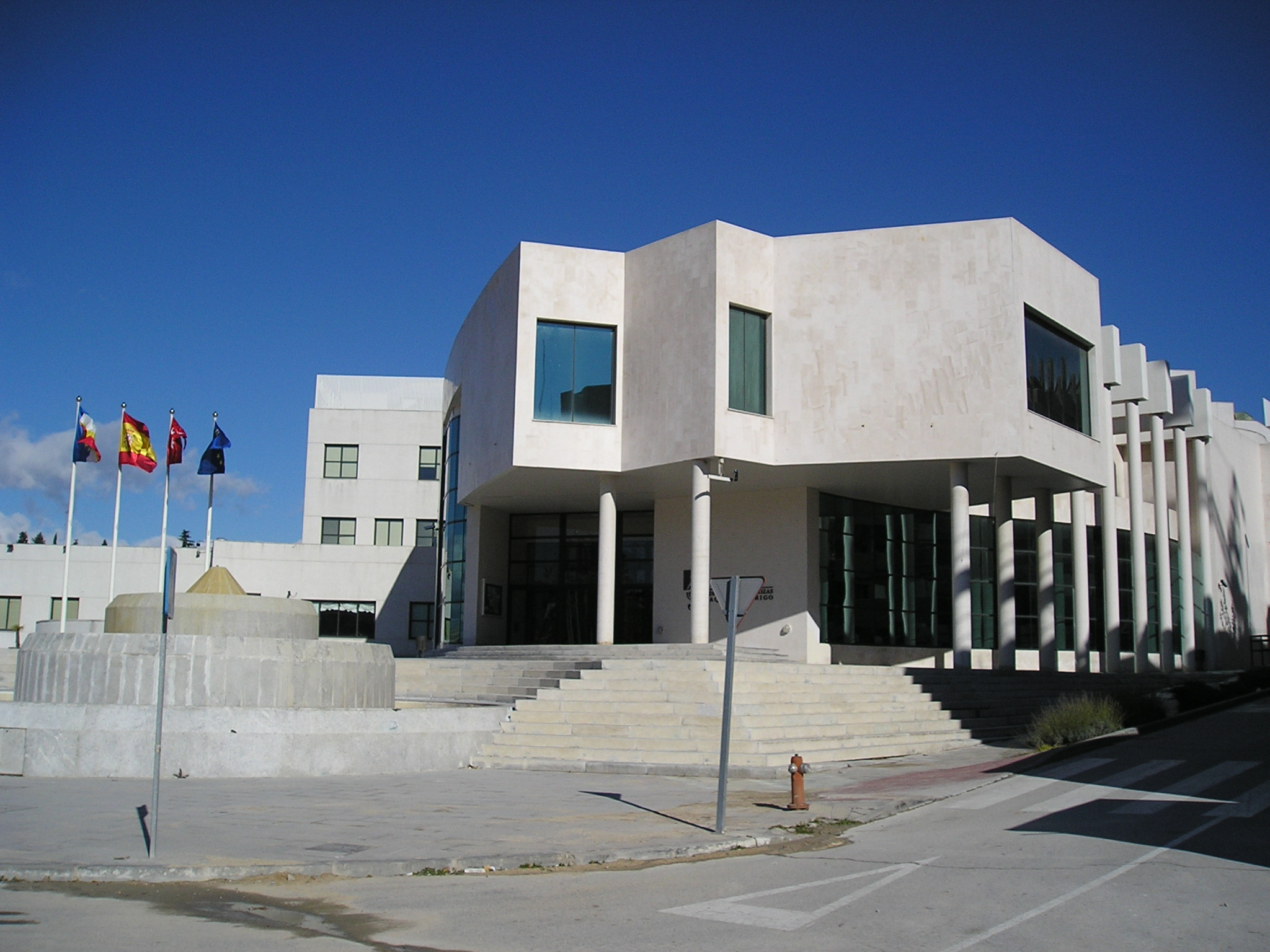
Joaquín Rodrigo Auditorium

There are many cultural activities mainly based around the Joaquín Rodrigo Auditorium, which includes a school of music and dance, four cultural centres, three libraries and five exhibition facilities.

Listed on the official web-site of the municipality there is: an annual Carnival, Concerts of Sacred Music, Coral Music and Folk Winter Festival as well as The Compositores de España International Piano Competition which has been held here since about 2000.

There are also various themed street-markets, fairs celebrating horsemanship in April, various seafood and tapas exhibitions in the summer and Festibike international cycling event in the autumn.

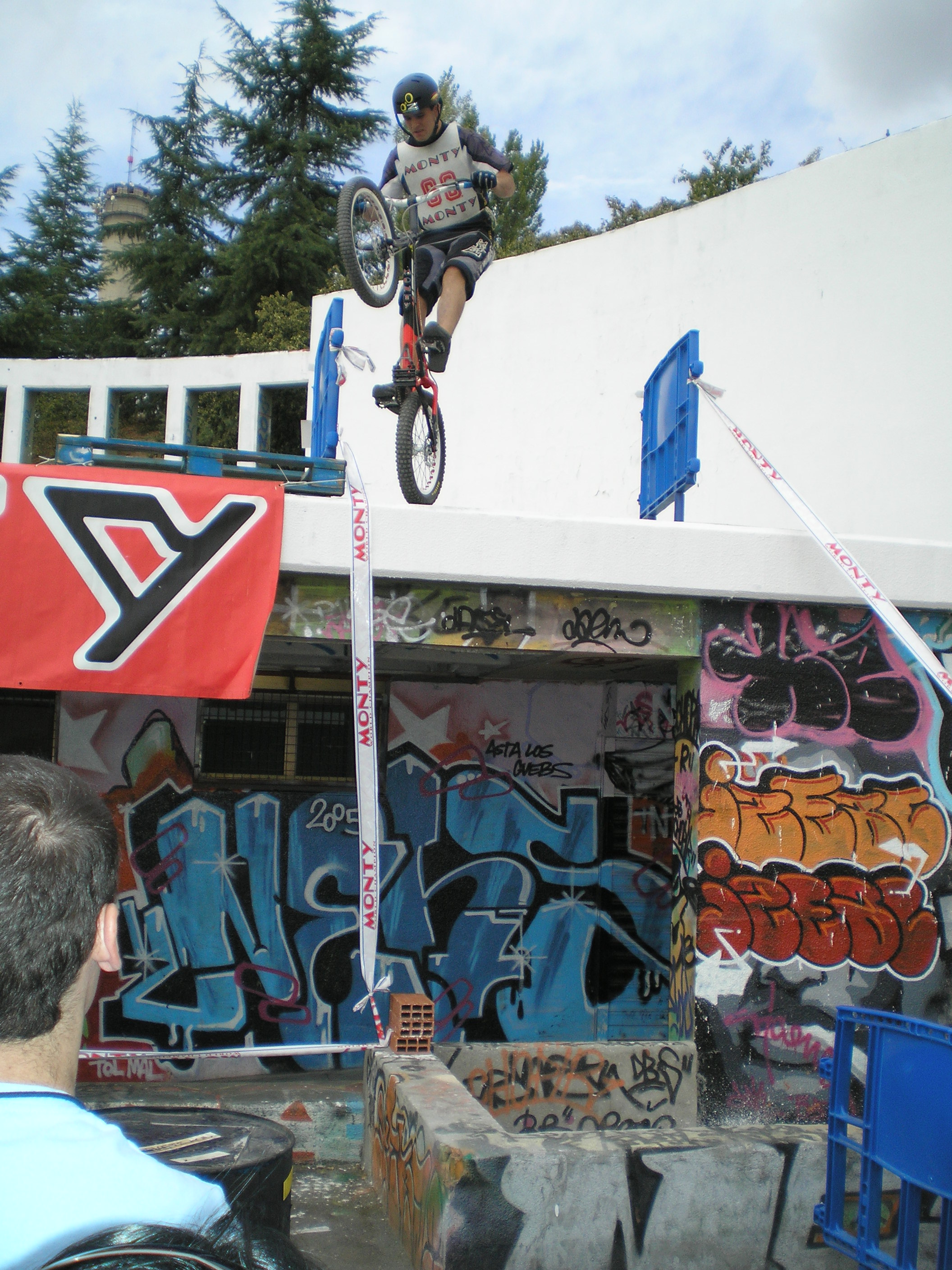
Festibike, which is now held in Las Rozas, offers exhibitions of Mountain bike trials skills as well as several road-races, static exhibitions and related activities for all ages.

== Sports ==
Sporting events have always been very important in Las Rozas and it is the only municipality that won two national sports prizes, in part due to the excellent training facilities available.

Las Rozas has a football team (Las Rozas CF) which competes in the Spanish Tercera División (level four of the Spanish football league system). Additionally the town has a futsal team that was recently relegated to the silver division.

Las Rozas has also a Basketball team which competes in Spanish third level called "LIGA LEB Plata". CB Las Rozas is growing year before year and now have more than 31 teams in their rows. During the 1990s, this team also performed well and narrowly missed out on promotion to the Premier division, today known as Liga ACB.

For the last 15 years Las Rozas has also had a significant Rugby team called A.D Ingenieros Industriales who have competed in the National First Division (the third level in Spanish Rugby). The club uses an artificial pitch in the Cantizal zone. Also playing at the el Cantizal field are the Las Rozas Black Demons, an American Football team competing in the LNFA.

Another noticeable facility in the municipality is the Ciudad del fútbol de la Real Federación Española de Fútbol (Royal Spanish Football Federation's Football City), build on lands donated by the Town Council. On two occasions the TSJM has failed to secure the return of these municipal plots.

Other popular sports are the Toad in the hole, Hammer throw, Calva, a sort of Horseshoes and chito, a pastime in which a discus is aimed at a target upon which a coin is balanced.

== Municipal politics ==
The Town Hall of Las Rozas is represented by 25 councillors, elected by universal suffrage every four years. The municipal council is chaired by the mayor and operates in plenary sessions and through commissions.

The current distribution of the councillors, after the municipal elections held in May 2023, is as follows:

Political parties in the Town Hall of Las Rozas 2023
Political parties	Councillors
PP	18
Vox	3
PSOE	3
Más Madrid	1

=== Mayors of Las Rozas before Spanish transition ===
- Juan Mingo Barrio (1576)
- Francisco Labrandero (known as el mozo probably meaning "the younger"), (1576)
- Joseph López Irrarraga (1751)
- Blas Gregorio (1751)
- Matías Rubio (1787)
- Francisco Benito (1787)
- Benito Velasco (1866)
- Baltasar Lázaro (1931)
- Blas Riaza (1935)
- Agustín Plaza (1939)
- Joaquín Lázaro Benito (1942)
- José González Cabeza (1943–1966)
- Santiago de la Cruz de la Fuente (1966–1970)
- Jesús Benito Sánchez (1971–1979)

=== Mayors of Las Rozas since Spanish transition ===
Since 2015, the mayor of Las Rozas is José de la Uz Pardos of the PP and currently rules in absolute majority with 18 councillors.

Mayor	Office started	Office ended	Party affiliation
Benito Garrido Turrillo	April 1979	October 1979	PSOE
Luis Schake de Miguel	October 1979	May 1980	PSOE
Doroteo Lázaro Mingo	May 1980	October 1981	PSOE
Luis Schake de Miguel	October 1981	1983	PSOE
Jesús Zúñiga Pérez-Lemaur	1983	1995	PSOE
Bonifacio de Santiago Prieto	1995	2011	PP
José Ignacio Fernández Rubio	2011	2015	PP
José de la Uz Pardos	2015	-	PP

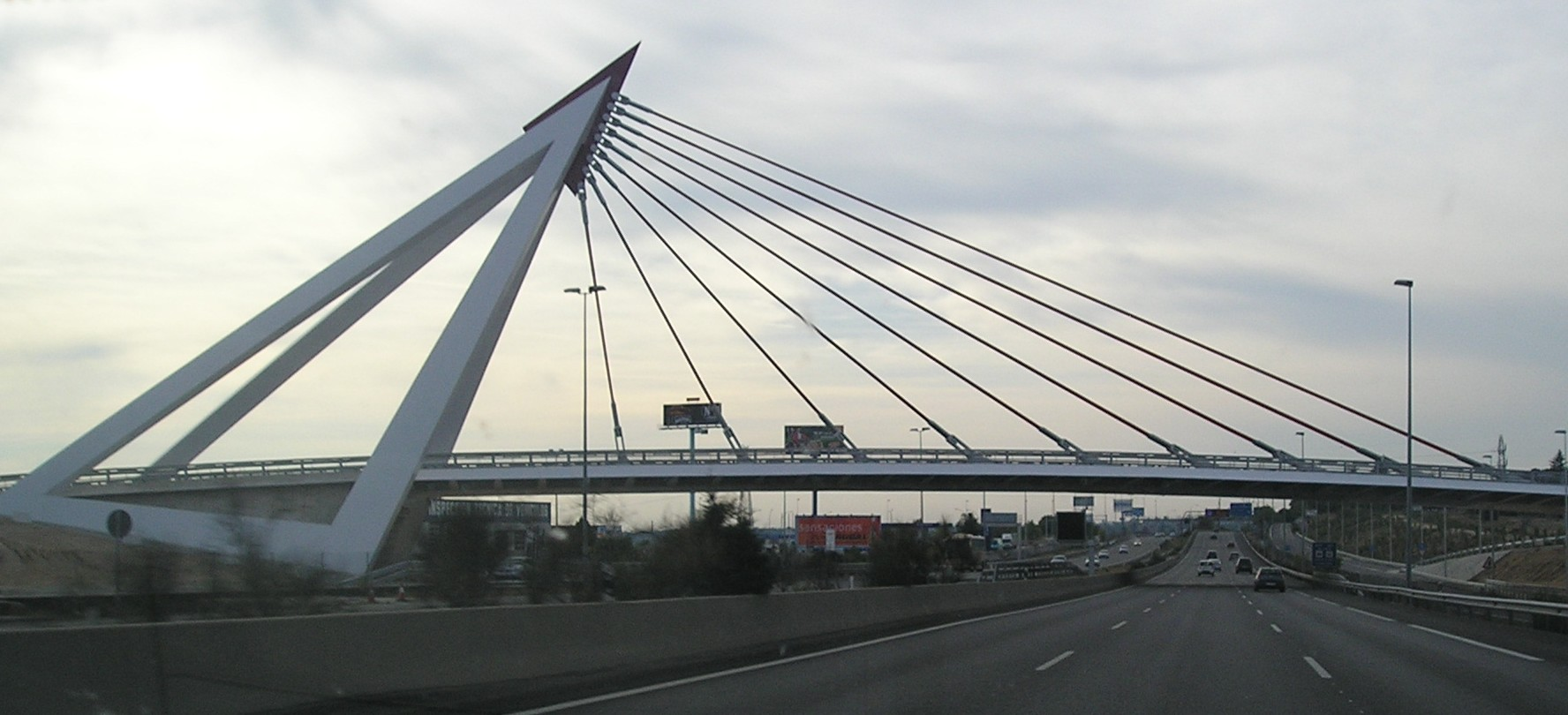
Bridge over A-6 autovia to A Coruña

== Demographics ==
( Fuente: Instituto de estadítica de la Comunidad de Madrid The first column is the value of the data in the municipality, the second is of the Metropolitan Western zone, the third is that of the community and the last one the year.

Population
	municipality	WESTERN zone	Community of Madrid	Year
Population	68,061	382,139	5,804,829	2004
Men	32,914	186,756	2,806,631	2004
Women	35,147	195,383	2,998,198	2004
Relative growth population	1.87	3.27	1.50	2004
Degree of youth	19.29	19.24	14.43	2004
Degree of aging	7.82	8.44	14.56	2004
Proportion of dependence	0.37	0.38	0.41	2004
Proportion of replacement	1.34	1.32	1.32	2004
Reason of progressiveness	114.52	110.36	116.21	2004
Rate of femininity	1.06	1.04	1.07	2003
Birthrate	16.98	15.06	11.23	2002
General rate of fertility	54.97	50.62	40.64	2002
Rate of marriage	5.78	5.38	5.35	2002
Rate of mortality	5.41	4.47	6.98	2002
Births mothers under 30 years old (%)	20.22	24.02	34.71	2002
Deaths under 50 years old (%)	6.57	10.31	8.34	2002
Growth vegetativo per 1.000 inhabitants	11.57	10.59	4.25	2002
Foreigners per 1,000 inhabitants	103.64	120.93	121.17	2004
Women on total registered foreigners (%)	58.99	54.21	50.06	2004
Births from foreign mothers (%)	9.38	12.66	17.37	2002
Rate of immigration	23.36	23.47	16.,23	2003
Foreigners per nationality (%)
American	5.99	6.80	6.87	2004
African	0.87	1.80	1.59	2004
Asian	0.57	0.44	0.63	2004
Unemployment registered per 100 inhabitants	2.59	2.62	3.61	2003
Evolution of unemployment registered (%)	-0.02	0.05	-0.12	2004
Affiliated to S.S per 1,000 inhabitants	439.76	346.96	445.73	2003
Rate of female activity	51.55	48.89	42.59	2001
Employed (%)
Agrarian sector	0.67	1.05	0.80	2001
Industrial sector	10.20	10.36	13.51	2001
Construction sector	5.16	7.55	9.61	2001
Services sector	83.96	81.04	76.08	2001

== Popular festivals ==
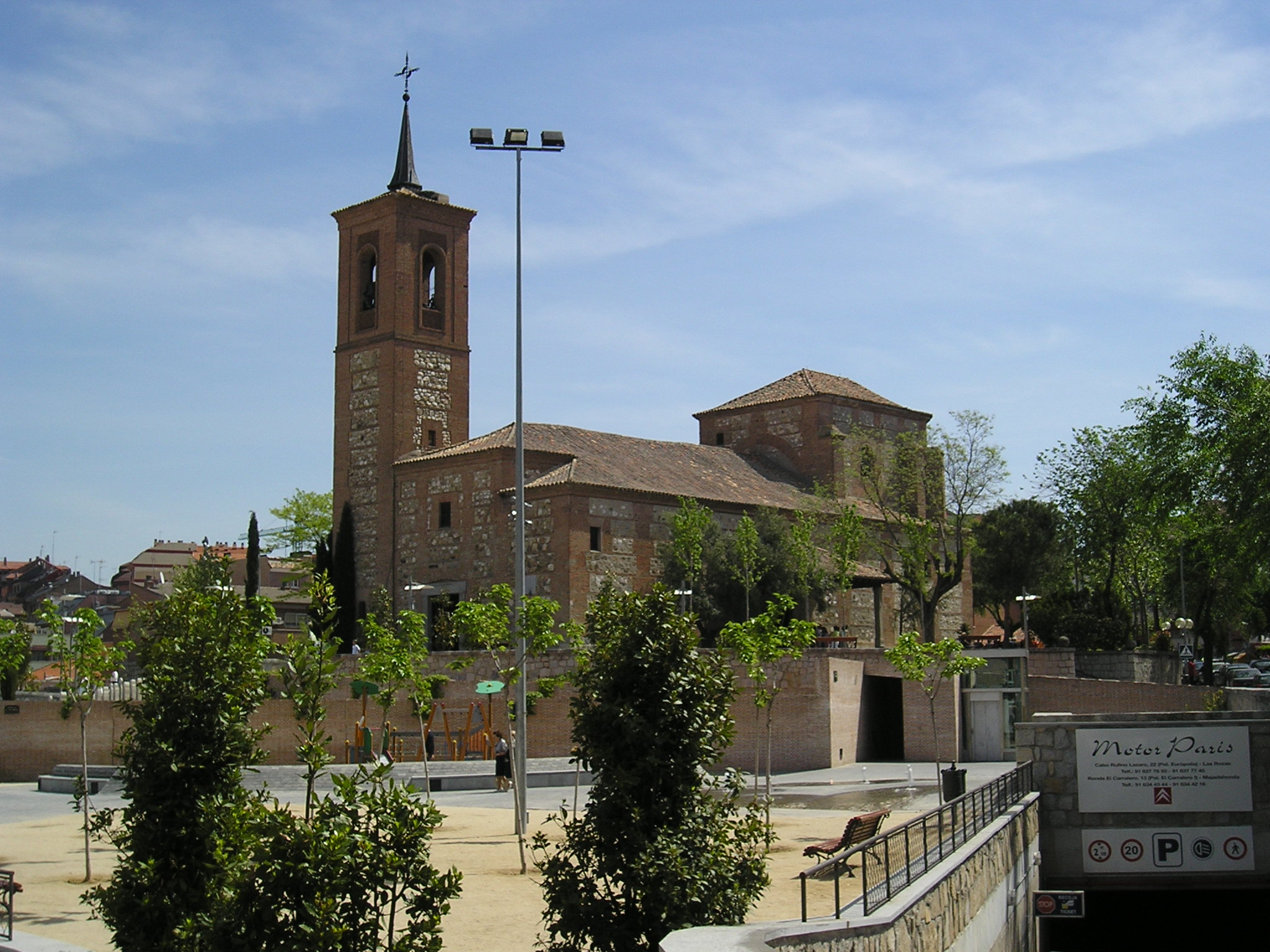
Church of San Miguel Arcangel

- 29 September: San Miguel Arcangel Day (St Michael Archangel). To celebrate the patron saint of the city, bullfights, concerts, gigantic paellas and popular contests are organized.
- First Sunday of May: Virgin of the Retamosa. The Virgin of the Retamosa is transferred in a procession from the Church of San Miguel Arcangel to the chapel situated in the Dehesa de Navalcarbón, once there a romería with dancing and contests is held.
- 1 May: San José Obrero (St Joseph the Worker), Labor Day,(Las Matas). Bullfights and concerts are organized.
- 6 January: At midnight on Epiphany, night of the Three Wise Men, draftees light the bonfire they've been preparing during the day, lately this tradition is being lost for two main motives, on one hand the objective was to get together all the young men drafted for active duty (military service), nowadays as the draft has been abolished it does not make sense and on the other hand the site of the bonfire is suffering constant moves due to real estate developments, from being held at the Plaza Mayor, then at the Plaza of Spain, subsequently next to the Auditorium and finally but not last at its present location at the Montecillo.
