= La Maliciosa =

Mountain in Spain

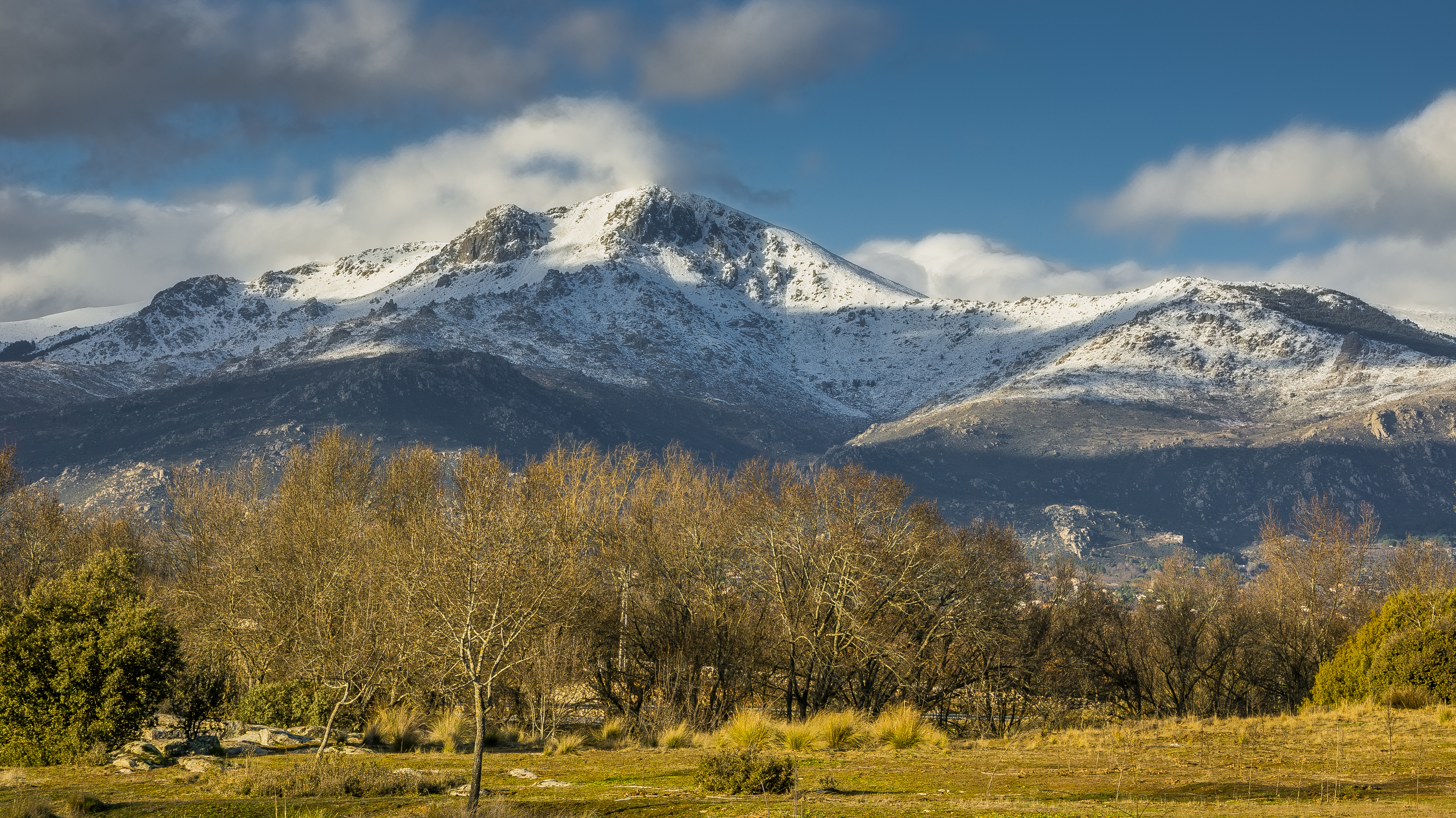
- Winter view of the mountain from the south

Highest point
- Elevation: 2,227 m (7,306 ft)
- Prominence: 153m
- Coordinates: 40°46′3.1″N 3°58′4.9″W

Geography
- Location within Spain
- Country: Spain
- Division: Community of Madrid
- Municipalities: Navacerrada, Becerril de la Sierra, El Boalo, Manzanares el Real
- Mountain chain: Sierra de Guadarrama
- Parent range: Sistema Central

Geology
- Mountain type(s): Mountain massif of gneiss and granite

Climbing
- Easiest route: On the northern slope, from the Navacerrada Pass

La Maliciosa is one of the most important and highest mountains of the Sierra de Guadarrama, a mountainous formation belonging to the Sistema Central. It has an altitude of 2227m above sea level and is located in the northwest of the Community of Madrid, in Spain, rising between La Pedriza, which lies to the east, and La Barranca valley, which is on its western slope.

It has a prominence of 153m, its profile is unmistakable and it stands out notably in the Meseta Central (Inner Plateau). This makes it one of the most striking and significant mountains of the Sierra de Guadarrama. Its southern face is the steepest and there are several ravines, alpine meadows and rocky areas. The slopes of La Maliciosa are dominated by low mountain scrub, although there are areas covered with Scotch pine trees. A large part of this mountain is within the Cuenca Alta del Manzanares Regional Park and within the Guadarrama National Park.

== Etymology ==
Originally, this peak was known as the "Montaña Maliciosa" (Malicious Mountain). This is due to the difficulty of its ascent, except for its northern slope. It has a fairly steep orography and there is a cumulative elevation gain of over 1100m. Later, the name was shortened and it is currently known as "La Maliciosa" or "Pico de la Maliciosa". This mountain is also known as "La Monja" because of its resemblance to a monk's headdress when covered with snow. The name of this mountain dates back to the 14th century, and like the Maladeta in the Pyrenees, La Maliciosa in the Sierra de Guadarrama is the cursed one, whose rock, always desolate and naked, receives the attacks of wind, ice, water and sun.

== Geographical location ==
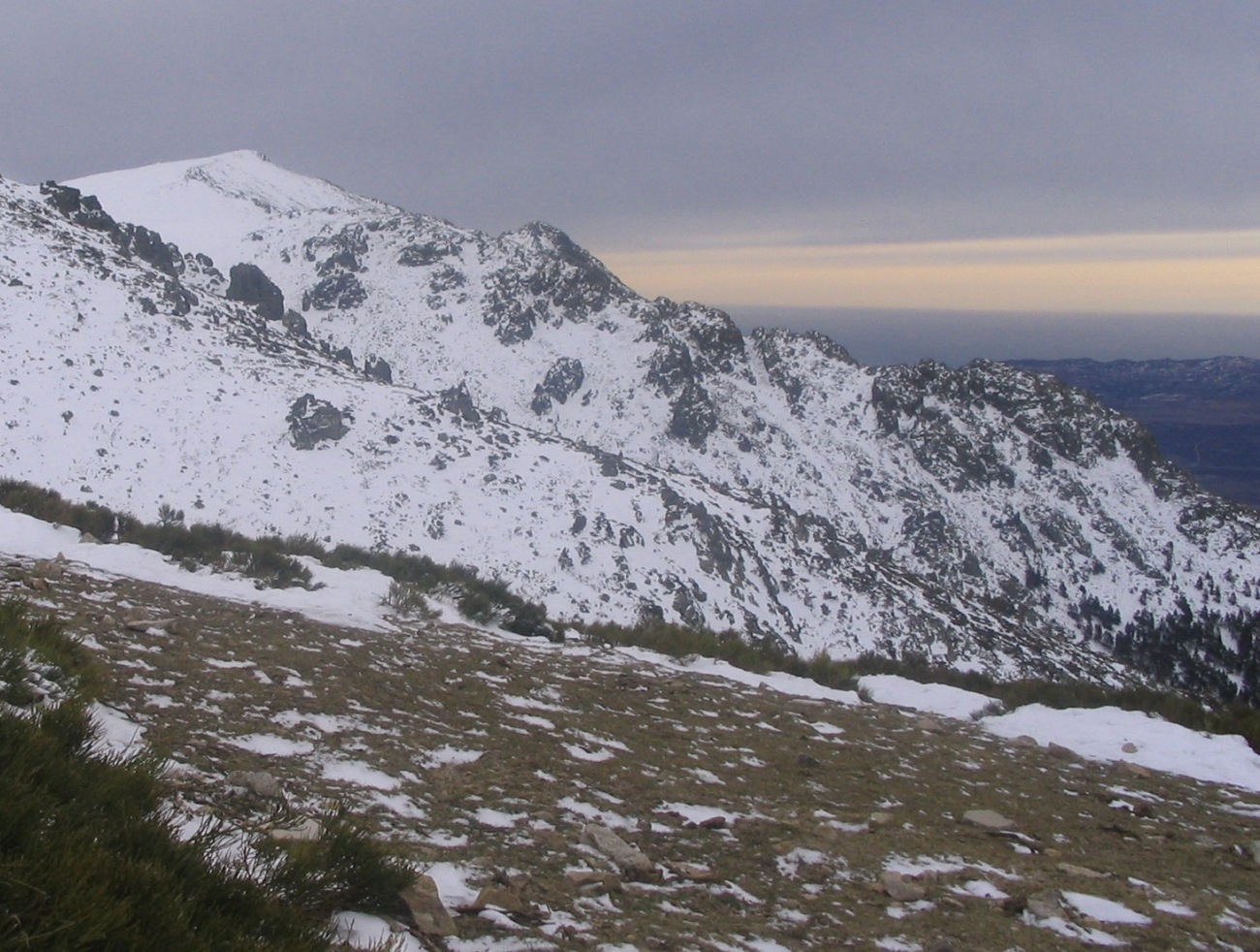
Northwest face of La Maliciosa as seen from near the summit of the Bola del Mundo.

At the summit converge the municipalities of Navacerrada, Becerril de la Sierra, El Boalo and Manzanares el Real, all of them located in the northwest of the Community of Madrid, in the center of Spain.

La Maliciosa is located at the southern end of a range of about 2 km long oriented from north to south and begins at the top of the Bola del Mundo (2265m). In this range there is a saddle of 2073m called Collado del Piornal. The Bola del Mundo belongs to the Cuerda Larga mountain range, oriented from west to east. La Maliciosa is the eastern slope of La Barranca valley, oriented from north to south, and is the western limit of the valley of the upper course of the Manzanares river, very close to La Pedriza. The southern face of this mountain descends very steeply to the 1000m altitude of the Meseta Central at the foot of the mountain. At the same time, from the summit and in a southeasterly direction, the Sierra de los Porrones, about 7 km long, rises. It loses altitude as it moves away from La Maliciosa and it highlights the peak of La Maliciosa Baja (1938m). This range ends next to the municipality of Manzanares el Real and at the southern end of La Pedriza.

At the top there is a geodesic vertex of the first order from where you can contemplate an excellent panoramic view of the Sierra de Guadarrama. In addition to the main summit, there is another one of 2125m, located to the southwest, called El Peñotillo or Falsa Maliciosa, because it deceives us visually when we make the ascent from the valley of La Barranca, making us believe that it is the main summit. Approximately 1.5 km to the east is another subsidiary summit of the main one called La Maliciosa Baja, of 1938m.

== Natural environment ==
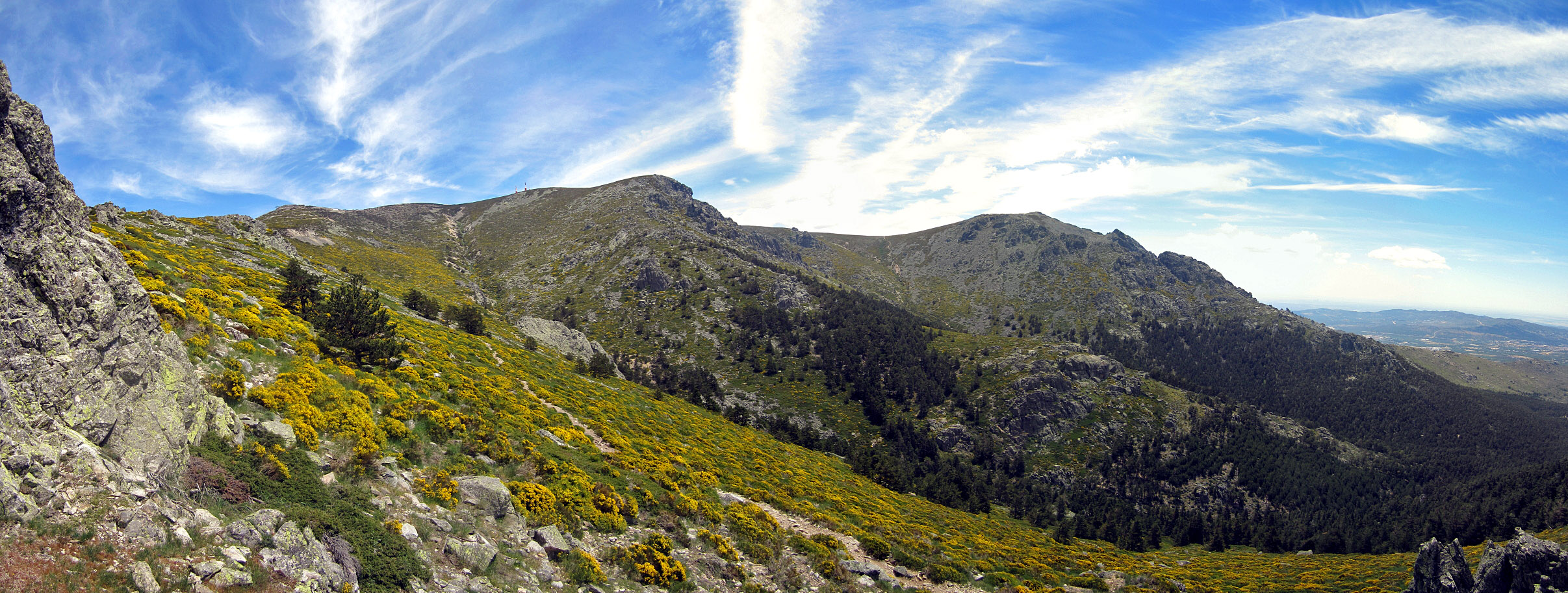
View of La Maliciosa and the valley of La Barranca, with cytisus in the foreground.

=== Flora and fauna ===
The slopes of this mountain are covered with different vegetation, depending on the altitude. From 1000m to 1300m can be found oakdales in fairly good condition, mixed with Scotch pine. From 1100m to 2000m, the predominant forest is that of Scotch pine. This tree species forms very dense forests on its western slope, that is, in La Barranca valley and on the northern slope of the Cuerda de los Porrones. The understory in this area is mainly composed of ferns. From 2000m onwards, the vegetation is composed of low high mountain scrub such as cytisus oromediterraneus and retama. This type of low vegetation, together with the juniper, extends along the southern slope, the steepest and rockiest, until it merges with the holm oak of the foothills.

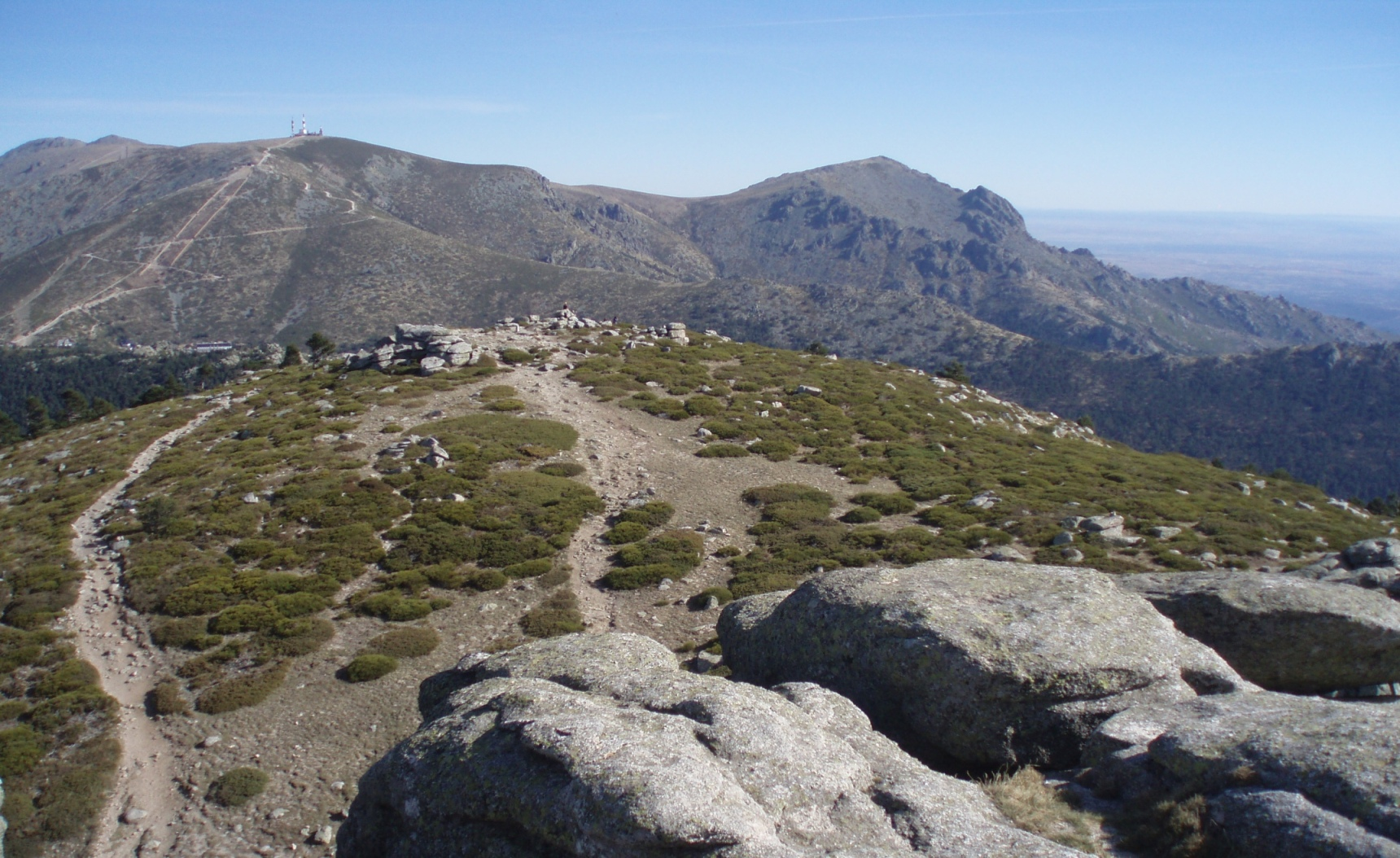
West slope of La Maliciosa (peak on the right) seen from Siete Picos. To the left are the Cabezas de Hierro and the Bola del Mundo. Between La Maliciosa and the Bola del Mundo we can see the Piornal pass, and next to the summit of La Maliciosa appears "el Peñotillo".

The main reason why trees do not grow above 2000m is the wind, which blows strongly and very often. The cold also influences the lack of proliferation of trees adapted to a more benevolent climate. On the steeper slopes, the high mountain scrub gives way to exposed stone, which in this case is granite.

- List of plant species: cytisus, jabino, cervuno, blueberry, heather, juniper, fern, Scots pine and high mountain wildflowers.

The fauna inhabiting the slopes of La Maliciosa is typical of the sierra de Guadarrama, with an abundance of small mammals, insects and birds of prey in the area. In recent years, La Maliciosa has been affected by the overpopulation of mountain goats (Iberian ibex) and it is very common to find entire herds of this bovine, especially in the summit area.

- List of animal species: mountain goat, fire salamander, dunnock, northern wheatear, bluethroat, common rock thrush, red-billed chough, Spanish imperial eagle, black vulture, European snow vole, common wall lizard, Iberian rock lizard, butterflies Parnassius apollo, Plebicula ni ecensis and Hyphoraia dejeani.

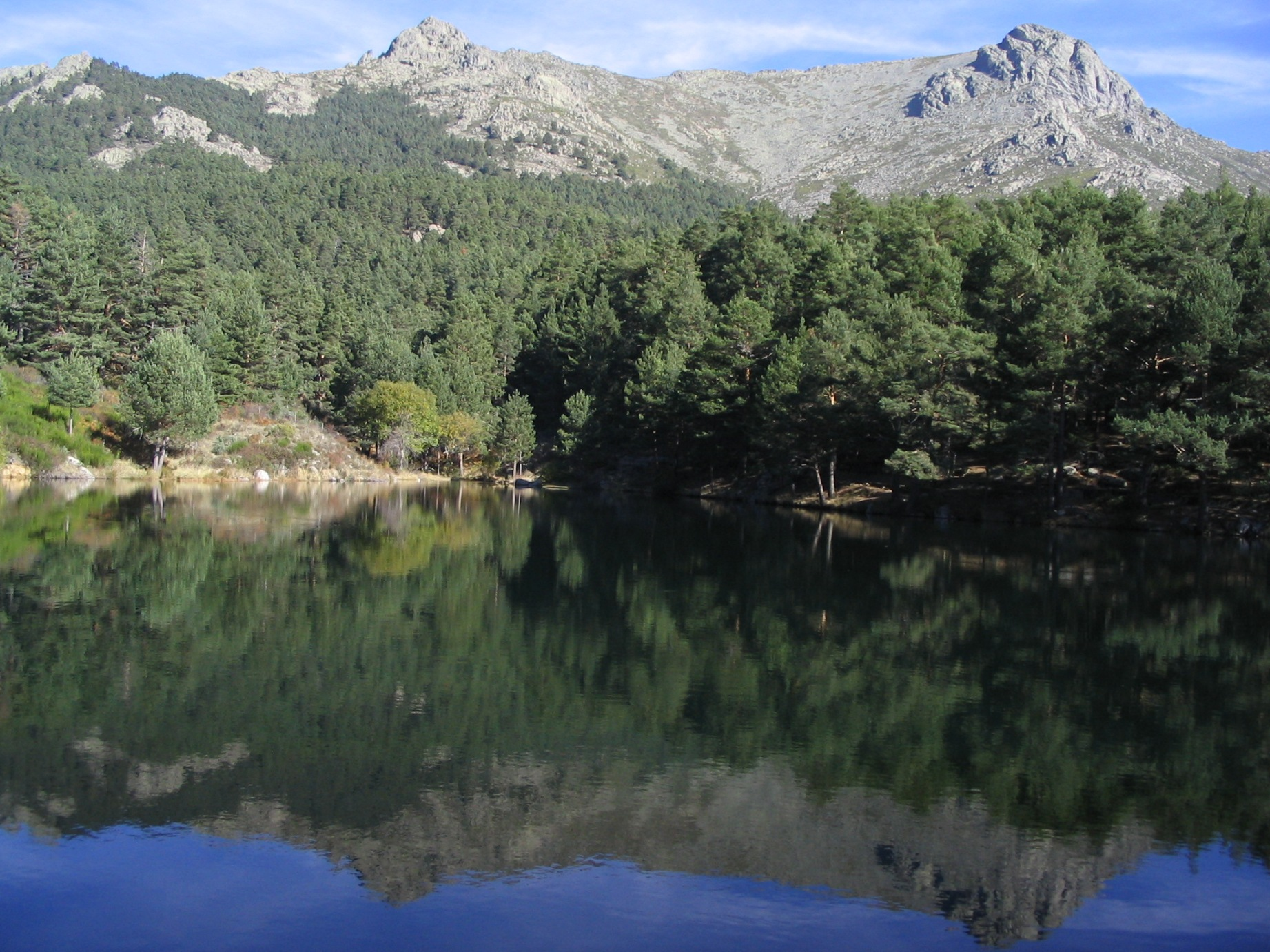
Small reservoir of the Samburiel river in La Barranca valley. To the right of the image appears "el Peñotillo".

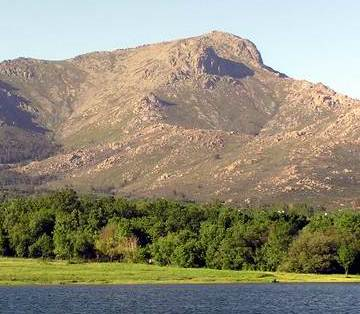
Southern slope of La Maliciosa as seen from the Navacerrada reservoir.

=== Hydrography ===
This mountain is entirely within the basin of the Manzanares river, which descends to the south until it flows into the Jarama and then into the Tagus. There are numerous water emanations in the surroundings of this peak, which give rise to streams that, in some cases, dry up in the summer season. The Samburiel river, also called Navacerrada river, rises on the western slope of La Maliciosa, in La Barranca valley. In its course there are two small dams that precede the Navacerrada reservoir, with a larger surface area than the previous ones. This river is a tributary of the Manzanares, which rises just 1 km north of the summit, in the emanations of the Ventisquero de la Condesa.

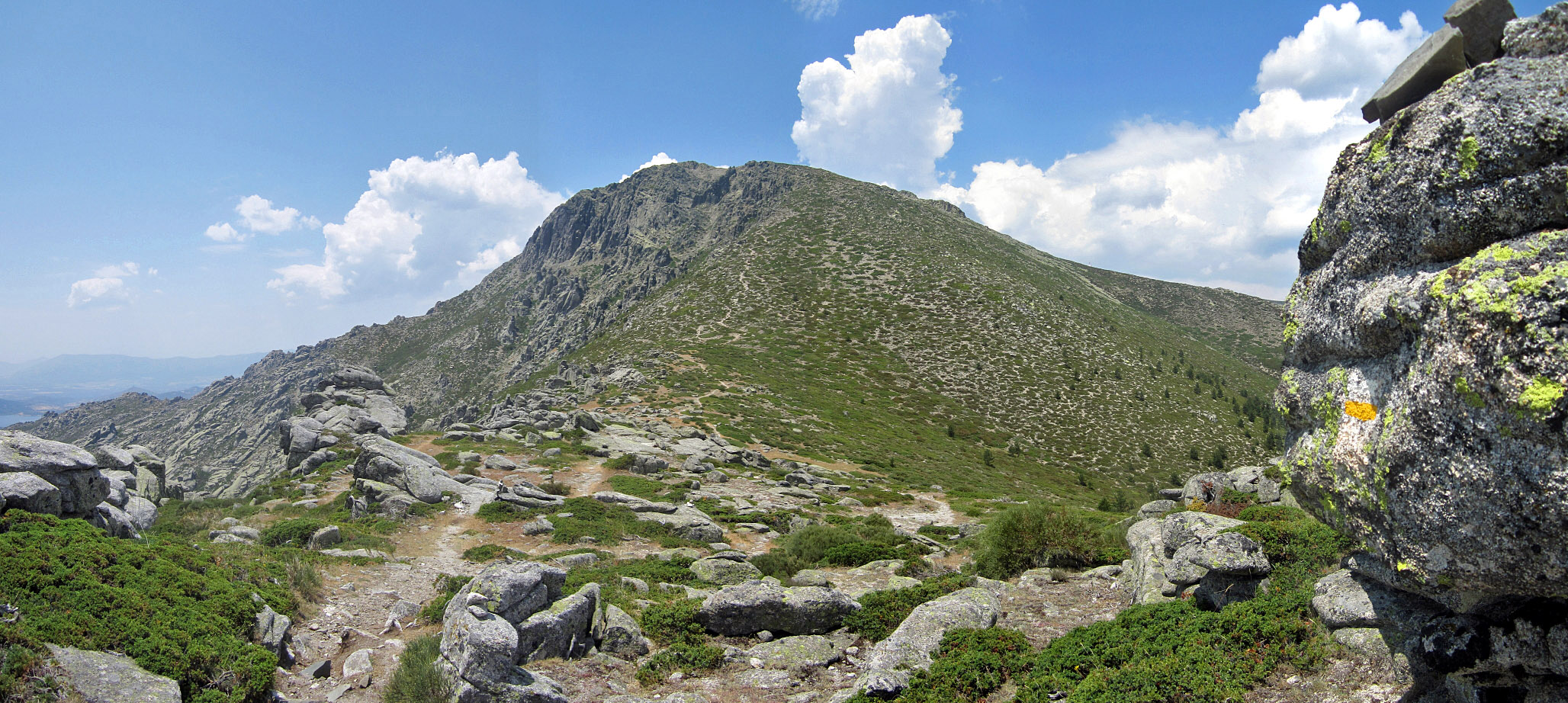
East face of the Maliciosa from Las Vacas pass.

=== Geology ===
The peak of La Maliciosa is part of the result of the collision between the plates corresponding to the Submeseta Sur and the Submeseta Norte, both belonging to the Meseta Central of the Iberian Peninsula. The elevation of this massif occurred in the Cenozoic Era (about 65 million years ago) although the materials on which it is based (the granitic plateau socle) are from earlier (from the Variscan orogeny). The most predominant type of rock in this mountain massif is granite, visible from the outside on the steeper slopes and on the cornice of the summits.

The glacial action of the Quaternary period (about 1.8 million years ago) finished modeling several of the current reliefs of the massif of La Maliciosa with small clefts located at more than 1800m, especially on the southern slope. It is one of the few mountains in the Sierra de Guadarrama, apart from Peñalara, where erosion of glacial origin has been detected, although this is much less than Peñalara's.

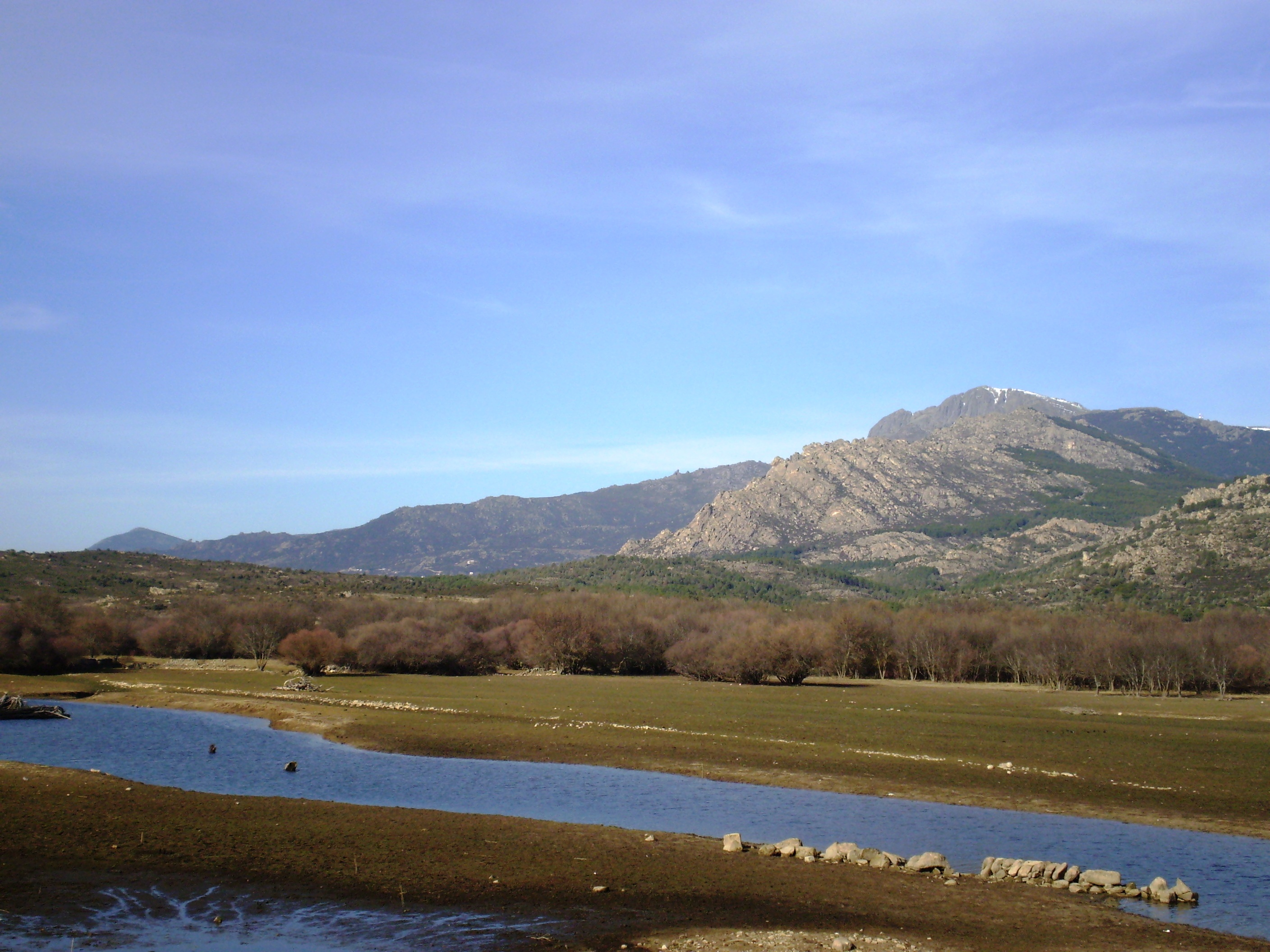
View of the southeastern slope of La Maliciosa with the Samburiel river in the foreground.

=== Climate ===
The climate of the peak of La Maliciosa is the characteristic mountain climate, although it has important influences of the continental Mediterranean climate, which is the one found in the Meseta Central. Temperatures vary with altitude, i.e., the higher the altitude, the lower they are, and rainfall also increases with altitude. The influences of the continental Mediterranean climate are reflected in the large temperature variation between day and night. This can be 12 °C in summer and 5 °C in winter. Precipitation is generally abundant (between 800 and 2500 mm/year) and is scarcer in summer. They are usually in the form of snow in winter and in the highest areas it can snow from October to May. It is necessary to differentiate two major climatic zones on the slopes of La Maliciosa.

Between 1100 and 1600m altitude, average temperatures range between 11 °C and 8 °C. In winter average minimum temperatures reach -3 °C and in summer maximum temperatures are 25 °C. The precipitations that fall in this zone oscillate between 800mm and 1000mm per year. These usually fall in the form of snow between the months of December and March.

Between 1600m and 2227m of altitude, the average temperatures range between 8 °C and 3 °C. In winter average minimum temperatures reach -9 °C and in summer maximum temperatures are 20 °C. The annual precipitations of this zone are very abundant, oscillating between 1200mm and 2500mm. They are usually snow between November and May, and this remains on the ground forming thicknesses that often exceed 2m, especially with the formation of ventisqueros, given the strong winds from the plateau that carry the snow to specific orographic points.

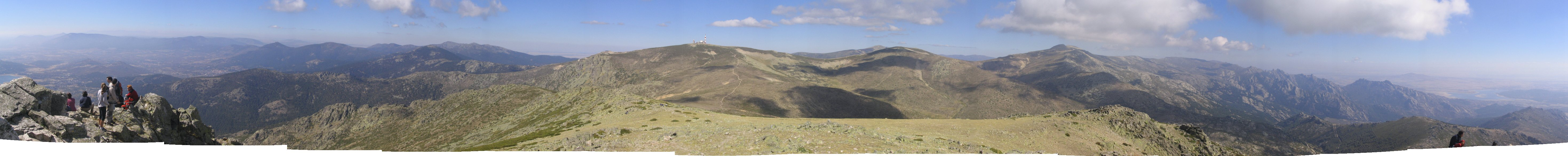
Panoramic view from the top of La Maliciosa. In the center of the image is the Bola del Mundo, on the left is Monte Abantos and on the far right is La Pedriza. Between the summit of the Bola del Mundo and La Pedriza the peaks of Cuerda Larga can be seen.

== Routes of ascent ==
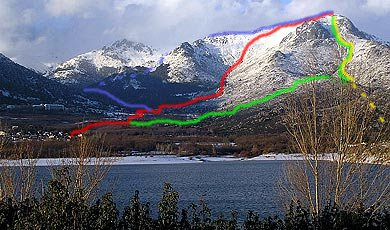
Routes of ascent to La Maliciosa. The photograph is taken from the Navacerrada reservoir.

The Maliciosa is one of the mountains of the Sierra de Guadarrama most frequented by hikers because it is one of the most representative and striking of there, and for having many and varied routes of ascent. Some of them have a notable difficulty, while the one that leaves from the Navacerrada Pass does not involve technical difficulties, except in winter, when ice and snow abound above 1500m. The most difficult routes are those that go up the west, south or southeast face, since they have a drop of more than 1100m and there are sections with significant slopes. The most advisable time to make the ascent is in spring, specifically in May, because in that month there is hardly any snow, it is not too hot, the streams are at their maximum flow and the meadows show their maximum greenery.

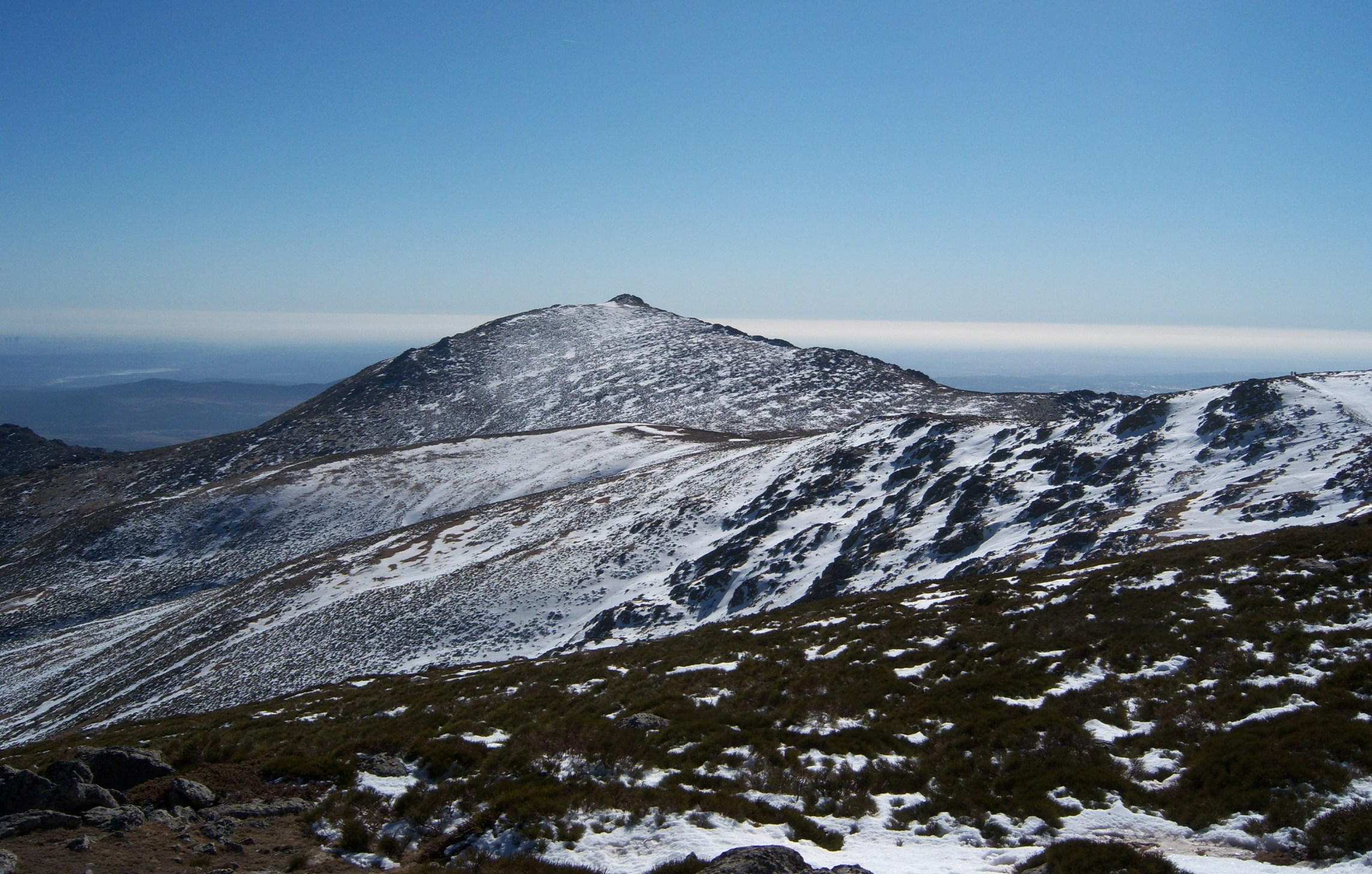
North face of La Maliciosa as seen from near the summit of Cerro de Valdemartín.

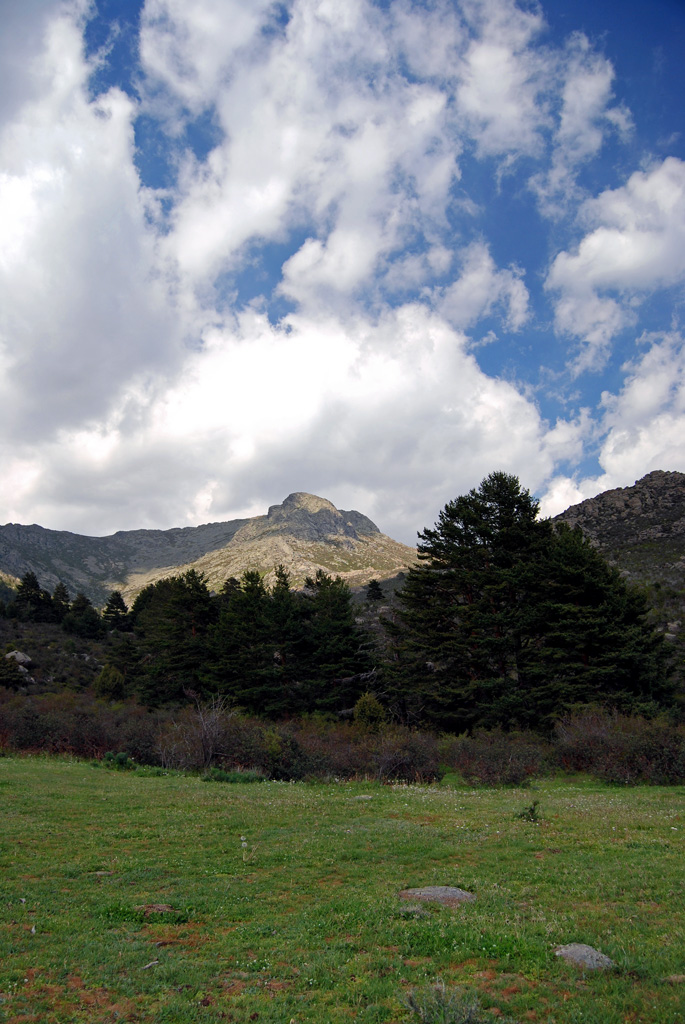
View of La Maliciosa from La Barranca valley.

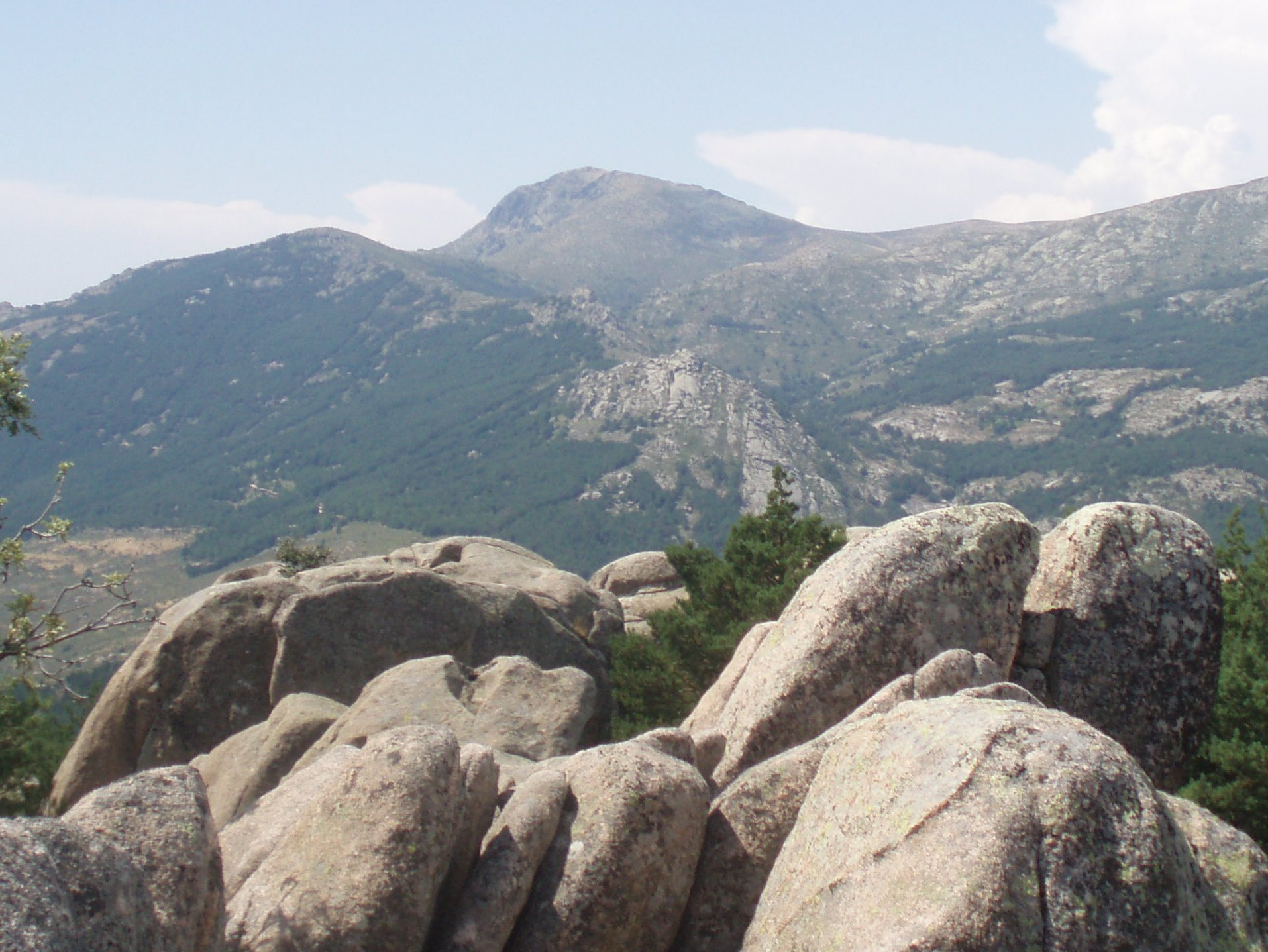
East face of La Maliciosa as seen from La Pedriza. The lower mountain seen to the left of the summit is La Maliciosa Baja.

== Cultural reviews ==
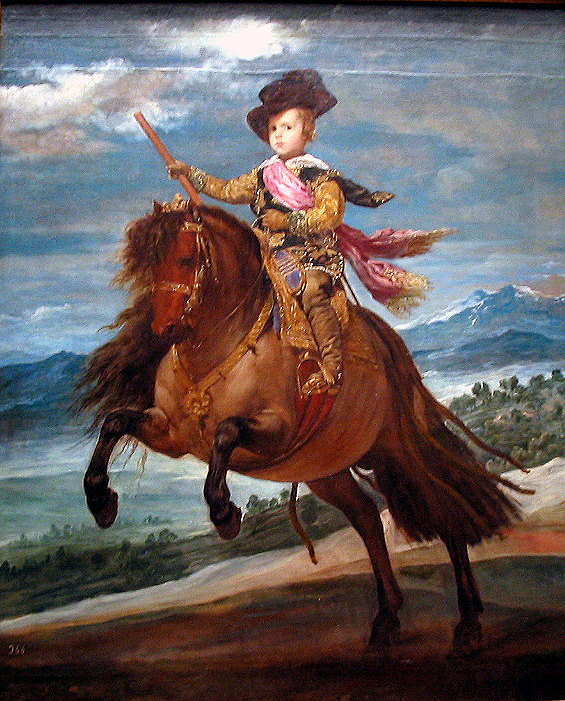
Equestrian Portrait of Prince Balthasar Charles by Diego Velásquez. In the background, La Maliciosa.

The profile of La Maliciosa that is drawn in the silhouette of the Sierra de Guadarrama as seen from its southern slope has attracted the attention of artists for a long time. It is for this reason that this mountain appears in some artistic works of great importance. In the painting Equestrian Portrait of Prince Balthasar Charles, painted by Diego Velázquez in 1635, La Maliciosa covered with snow appears in the background on the right.

An urban legend says that it can be seen in the final scene of the film A Fistful of Dollars by Clint Eastwood, but in reality the mountain that appears is El Picazo, belonging to the Sierra del Hoyo.

== Cartography ==
- "Guía de la Sierra de Guadarrama 1:50.000" map (in Spanish), edited by IGN.
- "Excursionista de Guadarrama 1:25.000" map (in Spanish), edited by Editorial Alpina. ISBN 84-8090-159-4
- "Excursionista de La Pedriza 1:25.000" map (in Spanish), edited by Editorial Alpina. ISBN 84-8090-160-8
- "Sierra de Guadarrama 1:50.000" map (in Spanish), edited by La Tienda Verde. ISBN 84-611-3107-X

== See also ==
- Sierra de Guadarrama

== Bibliography ==
- Fidalgo García, Pablo; Martín Espinosa, Agustín (2005). Atlas Estadístico de la Comunidad de Madrid 2005 (in Spanish). Madrid: Instituto de Estadística de la Comunidad de Madrid. ISBN 84-451-2786-1.
- Pliego Vega, Domingo (2005). Guadarrama. 50 xcursiones fáciles (in Spanish). Ediciones Desnivel. ISBN 84-96192-83-0.
- Rincón, Manuel (1987). Caminar por la Sierra de Guadarrama (in Spanish). Editorial Barrabes. ISBN 84-95744-38-4.
- Sánchez Martínez, Javier; Martínez de Pisón, Eduardo (2004). La Sierra de Guadarrama: imagen de una montaña (in Spanish). Ediciones La Librería. ISBN 84-95889-84-6.
- Vías, Julio (2004). La Sierra de Guadarrama. Biogradia de un paisaje (in Spanish). Ediciones La Librería. ISBN 84-95889-73-0.
- VV. AA. (2003). Peñalara. Revista ilustrada de alpinismo. Facsímil (in Spanish). Vol. II. Ediciones Desnivel. ISBN 84-451-2443-9.
- Zarzuela Aragón, Javier (2003). Excursiones para niños por la Sierra de Madrid. Ediciones La Librería. ISBN 84-95889-41-2.
