= La Barranca (valley) =

Valley in Community of Madrid, Spain

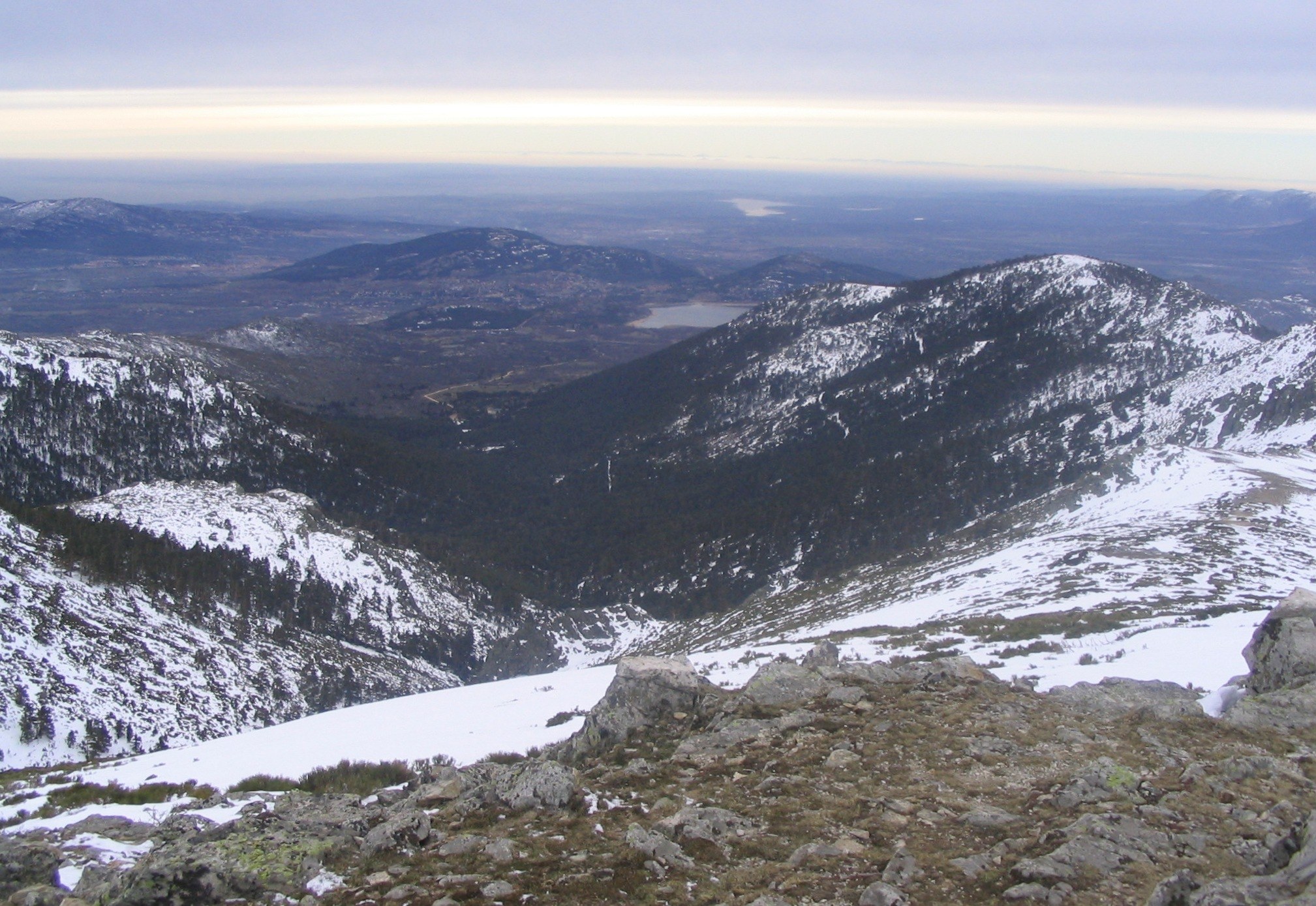
View of the Valle de la Barranca from the vicinity of Bola del Mundo. Photo taken in winter.

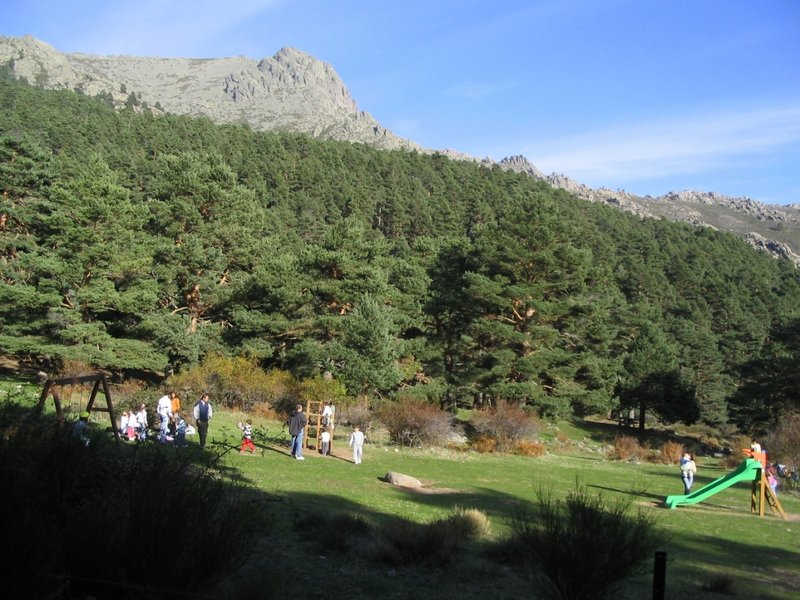
Recreational area of the Valle de la Barranca with La Maliciosa (2227 m) visible in the background. Photo taken in autumn.

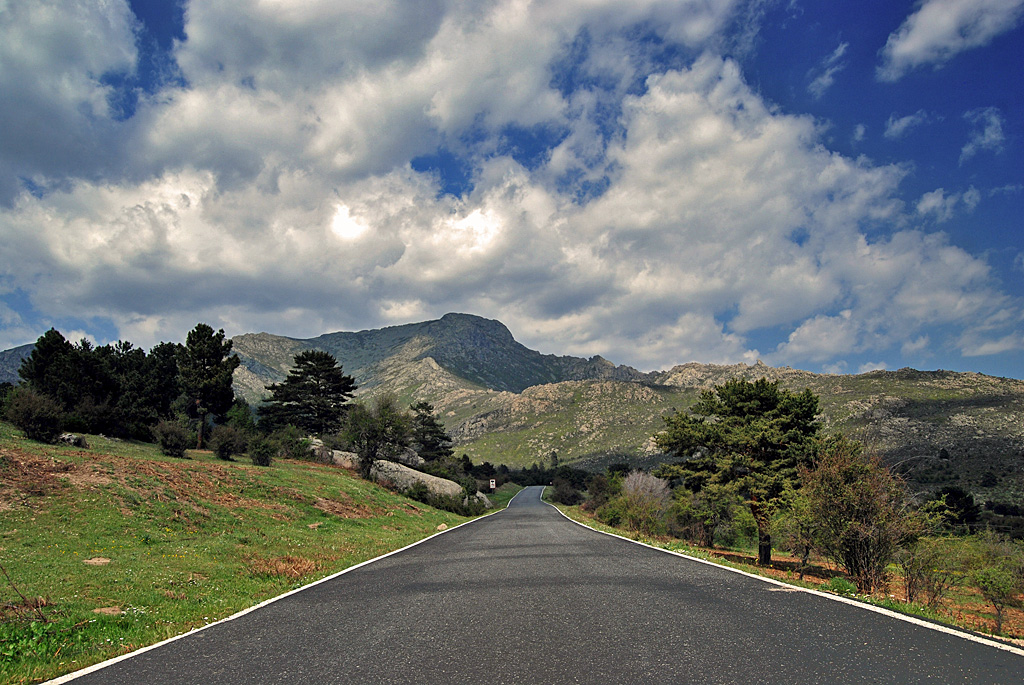
View of the Barranca road and the peak of La Maliciosa, spring 2010.

La Barranca valley is a mountain valley located at the foothills of Bola del Mundo (Alto de Guarramillas) (2265 m) and La Maliciosa (2227 m), within the Sierra de Guadarrama (a mountain range part of the Sistema Central). Administratively, it lies within the municipal boundaries of Navacerrada and Becerril de la Sierra, in the northwest of the Community of Madrid, Spain. The valley is home to a dense forest of Scots pine through which flows a mountain river, the Samburiel —a tributary of the Manzanares river—held back by two small dams, the Pueblo de Navacerrada Dam and the Air Force Dam, before emptying into the Navacerrada Dam.

== Access and Infrastructure ==
Access to the Valle de la Barranca is provided by the regional M-607 road, located shortly after the roundabout at the entrance to the town of Navacerrada. Near the end of the road are the ruins of a former tuberculosis hospital, which temporarily functioned as a residential facility for individuals with mental disabilities. The main structure is currently in an advanced state of disrepair, although one of its annex buildings has been recently renovated and repurposed as a hospitality school. However, it is planned to demolish it due to its state of neglect.

== Mountaineering ==
From a mountaineering perspective, the Valle de la Barranca serves as a base for several ascents. The most prominent is the climb to La Maliciosa, which features an elevation gain of nearly 1,000 meters, often termed the "Vertical Kilometer" by enthusiasts. An alternative route, less steep but longer, begins within the valley at the Fuente de la Campanilla and follows a path to the Collado del Piornal. From this point, climbers can proceed along the standard route originating from Bola del Mundo to reach the summit. The walls of Peñotillo (also known as the "false Maliciosa") and the north face of La Maliciosa offer numerous climbing routes with high-quality rock, intended for experienced climbers.

The Community of Madrid has established a marked trail in the Valle de la Barranca, covering approximately 11 kilometers. This trail commences at the car park in front of the La Barranca Hotel and progresses past the Pueblo de Navacerrada and Air Force reservoirs on the left. It turns left at Las Vueltas recreational area and continues along the Ortiz trail to a track leading up to the Mirador de las Canchas. The route then descends to the Fuente de la Campanilla, proceeds to the Fuente de Mingo, and loops back to the Vueltas recreational area. The return to the initial car park follows the same path used for the ascent.

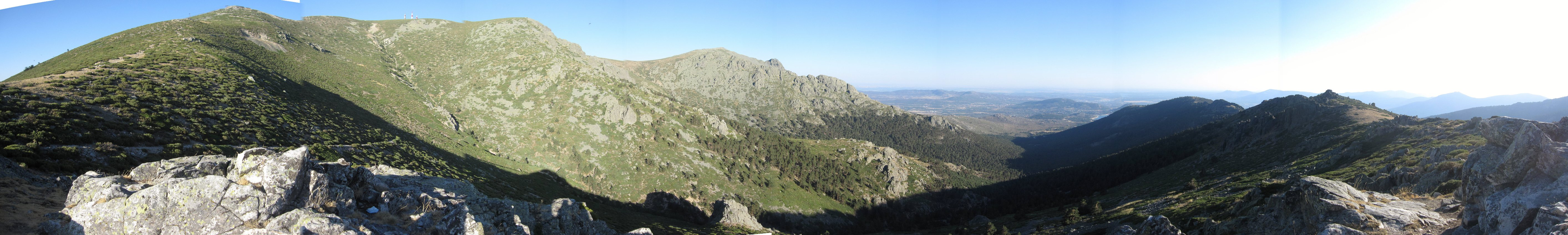
Panoramic view of the Valle de la Barranca from the vicinity of the Puerto de Navacerrada.

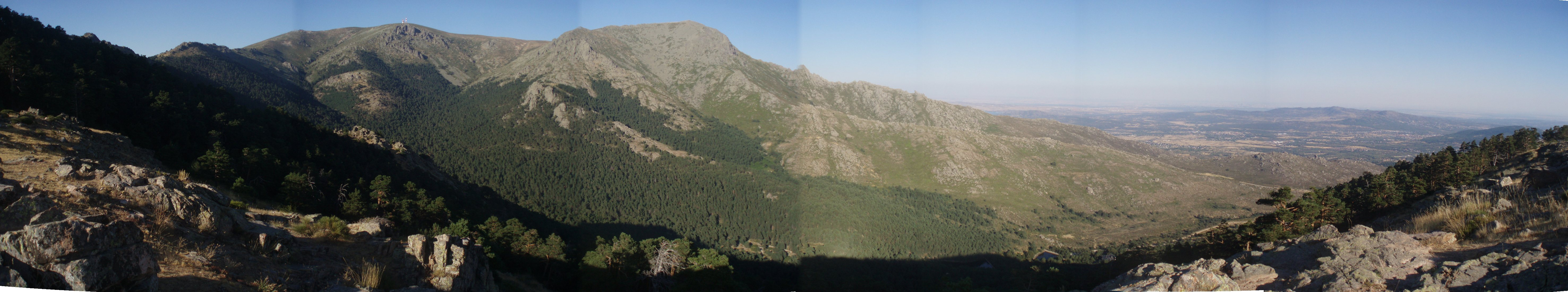
Panoramic view of the Valle de la Barranca from the Mirador de las Canchas. The image shows the valley’s two main mountains: Bola del Mundo on the left and La Maliciosa on the right.

== See also ==
- Sierra de Guadarrama
- Navacerrada
- La Maliciosa
- Bola del Mundo
