= Navacerrada =

- Municipality
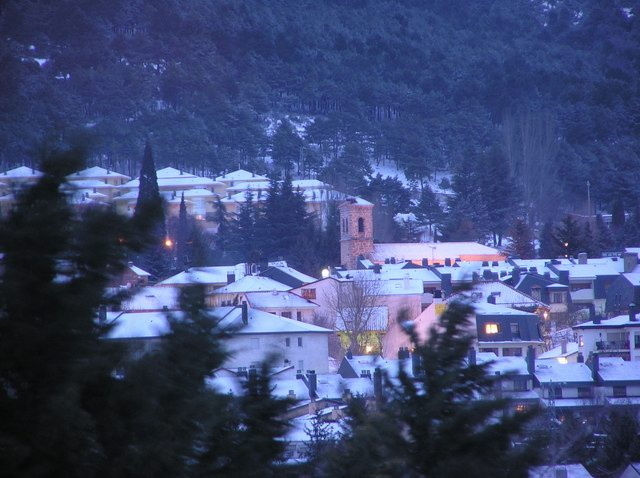
- Winter in Navacerrada

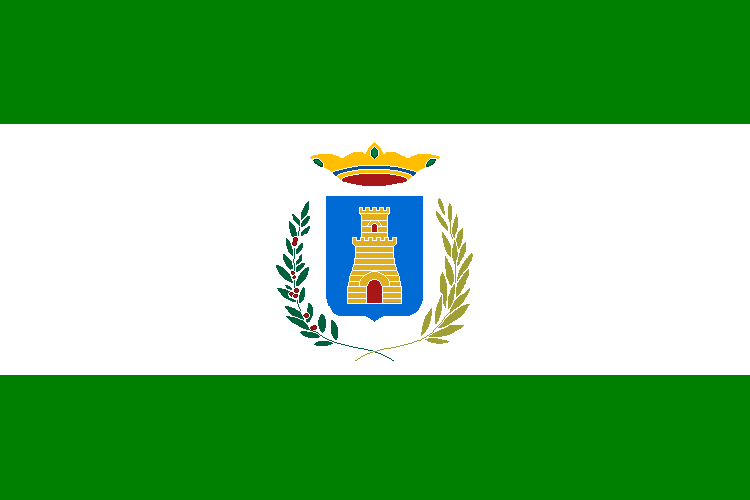
- Flag Coat of arms
- Nickname: Nava
- Location in Spain Navacerrada (Spain)
- Coordinates: 40°43′48″N 4°00′55″W
- Country: Spain
- Autonomous community: Community of Madrid

Population (2025-01-01)
  - Total: 3,311
- Time zone: UTC+1 (CET)
  - Summer (DST): UTC+2 (CEST)
- Climate: Csb

Navacerrada is a municipality of the Community of Madrid, Spain. It lies at an elevation of 1,203 metres (3,947 ft) on the Navacerrada Dam and the entry of the valley of La Barranca in the Sierra de Guadarrama.

Located 52 kilometres (32 mi) from Madrid, it has only 2,500 permanent residents, but winter visitors increase the population. The Navacerrada Pass has a ski resort that is very popular with winter sportspeople. It has a ski school and various restaurants, hotels and accommodation.

== Climate ==
Although relatively close to Madrid, Navacerrada has a Mediterranean climate with cool/warm summers due to elevation (Köppen: Csb) or dry-summer continental climate (Dsb) by 0 °C isoterm, winter is also usually on average a few degrees cooler than the Spanish capital. The city has a clearly dry summer, but the high rainfall can be between spring and fall, being lower only in late winter, rather than gradually decreasing in transitional seasons.

The next graphic shows the averages and record temperatures at the Navacerrada mountain pass, which is located at an elevation 600 meters above the village of Navacerrada.

Climate data for Navacerrada (1981-2010) (altitude: 1894 m, satellite view)
Month	Jan	Feb	Mar	Apr	May	Jun	Jul	Aug	Sep	Oct	Nov	Dec	Year
Record high °C (°F)	16.2 (61.2)	16.8 (62.2)	18.6 (65.5)	22.6 (72.7)	25.4 (77.7)	32.0 (89.6)	30.8 (87.4)	31.8 (89.2)	30.8 (87.4)	23.4 (74.1)	20.0 (68.0)	17.0 (62.6)	32.0 (89.6)
Mean daily maximum °C (°F)	2.3 (36.1)	3.0 (37.4)	5.8 (42.4)	7.0 (44.6)	11.5 (52.7)	18.0 (64.4)	22.4 (72.3)	22.2 (72.0)	17.2 (63.0)	10.6 (51.1)	5.6 (42.1)	3.3 (37.9)	10.7 (51.3)
Daily mean °C (°F)	−0.4 (31.3)	0.1 (32.2)	2.3 (36.1)	3.4 (38.1)	7.4 (45.3)	13.2 (55.8)	17.0 (62.6)	16.8 (62.2)	12.7 (54.9)	7.3 (45.1)	2.8 (37.0)	0.7 (33.3)	6.9 (44.4)
Mean daily minimum °C (°F)	−3.2 (26.2)	−2.9 (26.8)	−1.1 (30.0)	−0.3 (31.5)	3.2 (37.8)	8.3 (46.9)	11.5 (52.7)	11.5 (52.7)	8.2 (46.8)	3.9 (39.0)	0.1 (32.2)	−2.0 (28.4)	3.1 (37.6)
Record low °C (°F)	−18.2 (−0.8)	−18.6 (−1.5)	−14.7 (5.5)	−11 (12)	−8 (18)	−3.4 (25.9)	0.0 (32.0)	0.2 (32.4)	−3 (27)	−7.6 (18.3)	−11.8 (10.8)	−20.3 (−4.5)	−20.3 (−4.5)
Average precipitation mm (inches)	124 (4.9)	96 (3.8)	84 (3.3)	127 (5.0)	124 (4.9)	64 (2.5)	23 (0.9)	26 (1.0)	60 (2.4)	156 (6.1)	176 (6.9)	163 (6.4)	1,223 (48.1)
Average precipitation days	12	10	9	12	12	7	3	4	7	12	12	13	111
Average snowy days	12	12	9	11	5	1	0	0	0	3	8	11	71
Average relative humidity (%)	80	79	74	77	72	59	47	49	63	79	83	81	70
Mean monthly sunshine hours	109	114	162	166	215	289	348	321	211	146	103	92	2,268
Source 1: Agencia Estatal de Meteorología
Source 2: Agencia Estatal de Meteorología (record values)

== Public transport ==
=== Bus ===
- 690: Guadarrama - Collado Mediano - Navacerrada
- 691: Madrid (Moncloa) - Becerril de la Sierra - Navacerrada - Valdesquí
- 696: Collado Villalba (hospital) - Navacerrada

=== Train ===
Navacerrada has a train station by which line C-9 of Cercanías Madrid runs through. This line connects Navacerrada with Cotos and Cercedilla.
