= Bola del Mundo =

Mountain in Spain

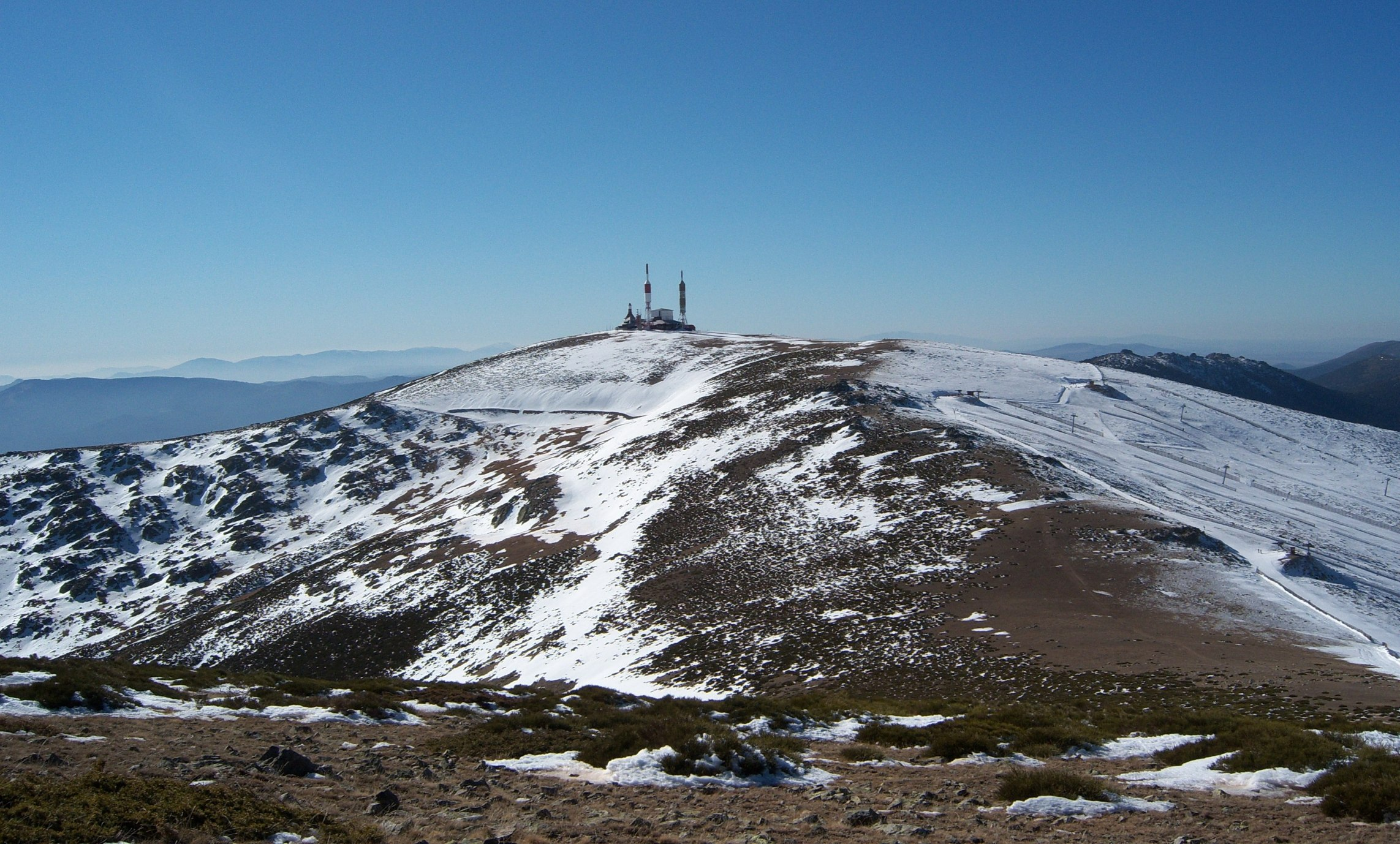
- Eastern slope of the Bola del Mundo.

Highest point
- Elevation: 2,265 m (7,431 ft)
- Prominence: 103 m (338 ft)
- Coordinates: 40°47′06″N 3°58′48″W

Geography
- Parent range: Sistema Central

Climbing
- Easiest route: On the western slope, from the Puerto de Navacerrada

Bola del Mundo or Alto de las Guarramillas is a mountain in the Sierra de Guadarrama, in the Sistema Central of the Iberian Peninsula. It is located in the Community of Madrid, near the border with the province of Segovia, in Spain. It has an altitude of 2257 meters with a prominence of 103 meters, and is the westernmost summit of the Cuerda Larga mountain range. Very close to the summit, on the east side, is the Ventisquero de la Condesa, an area with water emanations that constitutes the source of the Manzanares river, and where great thicknesses of snow accumulate in winter.

== Etymology ==
The origin of the name is recent, since it appeared with the installation of the television and radio signal repeater antennas in 1959. At the time of the installation of these repeater antennas there was only one television channel in Spain (TVE 1), whose emissions began with an image of the globe and on it, in the center of Spain, appeared some rocket-shaped antennas that emitted semicircular waves, motivating that this name was given to the place where the television signal came from, whose toponym is Alto de Guarramillas. This place is part of the Guarramas, a group of relief elements located in the surroundings of this mountain. "Guarramas" is a toponym that comes from the medieval word "Guadarramiellas", which in turn comes from "Guadarrama", the name of the mountain range where the mountain is located. The antennas are located in the municipality of Manzanares el Real.

== Location ==
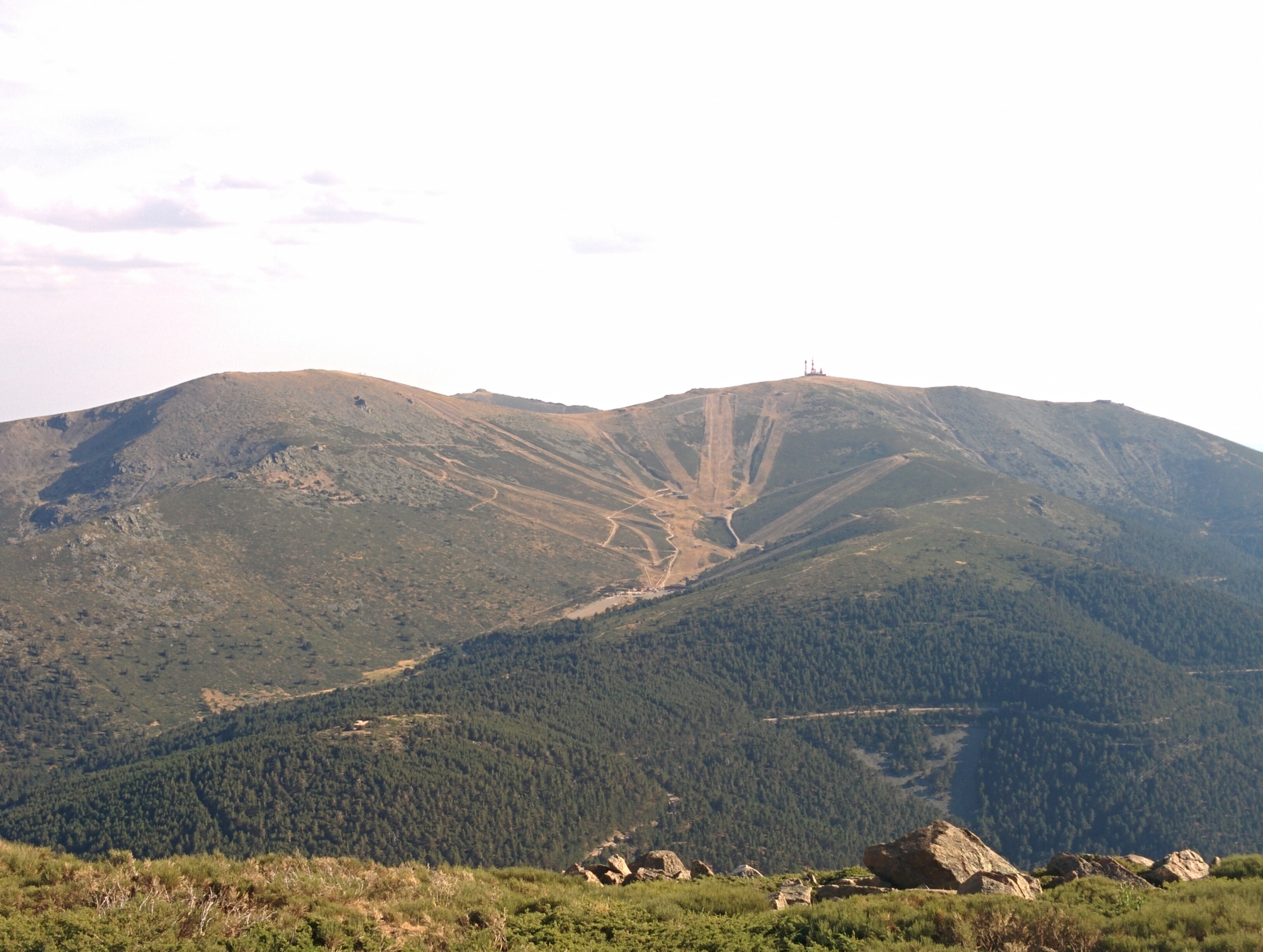
The Bola del Mundo (right) from the Peñalara massif.

The Bola del Mundo is the westernmost mountain of the Cuerda Larga mountain range and is located in the central area of the Sierra de Guadarrama, having on its southern slope the peak of La Maliciosa (2227 m) and the valley of La Barranca, to the west the Navacerrada pass (1858 m) and to the east the rest of Cuerda Larga. To the north of the summit there is a small mountainous branch, called Loma del Noruego, which separates the valleys of Valsaín, to the west, and Lozoya, to the east. In the vicinity of the summit, on the northeastern slope, is the ski resort of Valdesquí. Similarly, the Puerto de Navacerrada ski resort is located on its western slopes. Near its summit, at an altitude of 2000 meters and on its southeastern slope, is the Ventisquero de la Condesa, a place where there are several water springs that are the source of the Manzanares river.

Cayetano Enríquez de Salamanca in his book (now out of print) Por la Sierra de Guadarrama (page 107), a person who was careful with the toponymy of the mountains, described the situation of the four Guarramillas: ".... the Guarramillas, a group of four summits about which there is an evident toponymic confusion, since some of them are called Guarramas, although this name does not exist (already in the 14th century Alfonso XI called them "Guadarramiellas")...".

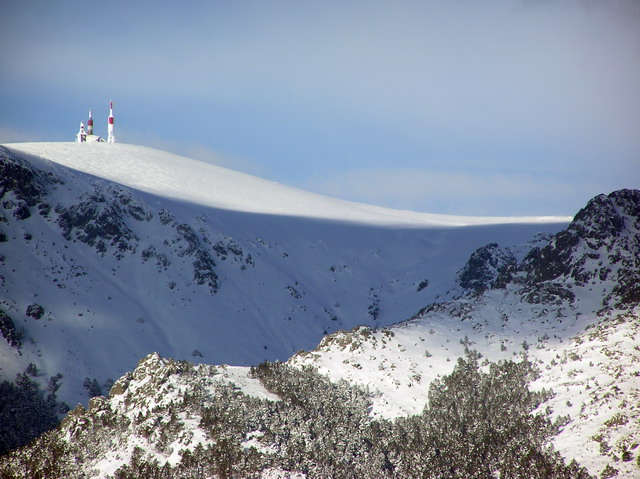
Snowy view of the mountain.

The same author placed them from W to E, coinciding the 1st Guarramilla with the elevation 2181 m, is the most rocky and is located in it a sculpture of the Virgen de las Nieves, and the station / upper bar of the chairlift of the Puerto de Navacerrada; its highest point is attached and behind the bar, accessed by a rock staircase with protection cable. The 2nd Guarramilla was located at elevation 2210 m and to the W of the 1st, to the left of the concrete track (as we go towards the TV antennas) and topped with a metal cross, although its highest point is a small rock promontory a few meters further to the E. The 3rd Guarramilla is the highest, it is located to the ESE of the 2nd and in its summit plain the TV antennas are located; it has a geodesic vertex of the IGN at 2262m according to Cayetano E. de S. (to the S of the TV installations). Finally the 4th Guarramilla is a small projection seen from the N, and a plain approaching from the 3rd, and to the NNE of this one; about 300 m from this last one, Cayetano said to be at 2246 m. On the summit plateau an old rain gauge has been "recycled" as an information panel of the surrounding summits. To the N and at the foot of this elevation we can see the cone where the Valdesquí alpine ski resort is located. With the progress and improvement of current measuring equipment, the elevations cited by Cayetano E. de Salamanca are those corresponding to 2179 m, 2227 m, 2258 m, and 2248 m of the 1st, 2nd, 3rd and 4th Guarramillas according to the IGN maps in their latest editions.

The route starts at the Navacerrada pass, climbs to the Alto de las Guarramillas, begins the descent at the source of the Manzanares River and, after a long descent, reaches Manzanares el Real bordering La Pedriza.

== Access ==
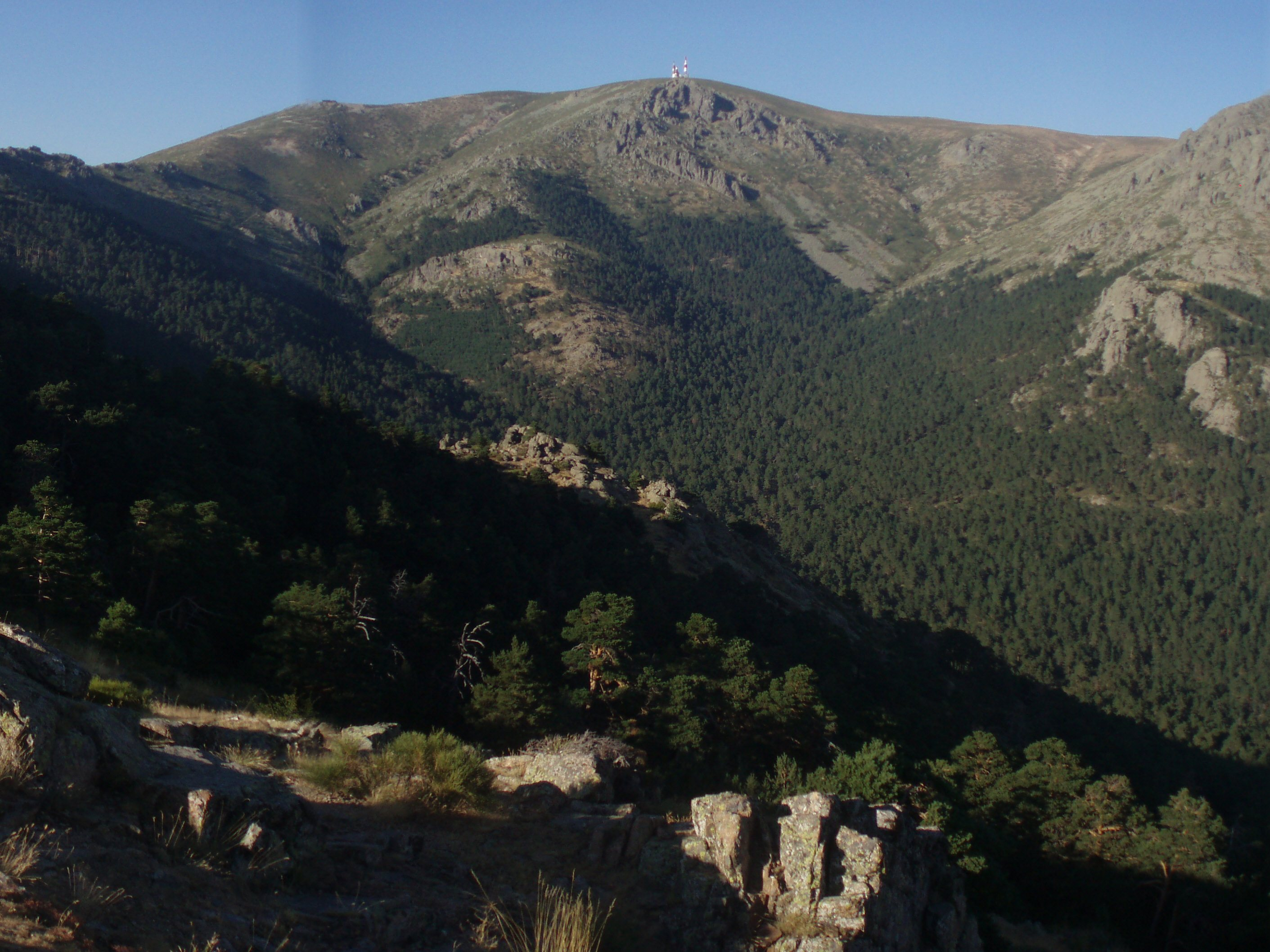
Southwest side of the Bola del Mundo as seen from the viewpoint of Las Canchas.

The quickest access to the summit is by a hard concrete forest track, which starts at Puerto de Navacerrada (1880 m) and ascends the western slope of this mountain, until reaching the summit after approximately 40 minutes of walking. Halfway and at 2170 meters of altitude is Dos Castillas, a place where there is a bar-restaurant and is the head of a chairlift that leaves the Puerto de Navacerrada. It is open in winter and on weekends during the non-ski season, including the summer season.

== Antennas ==
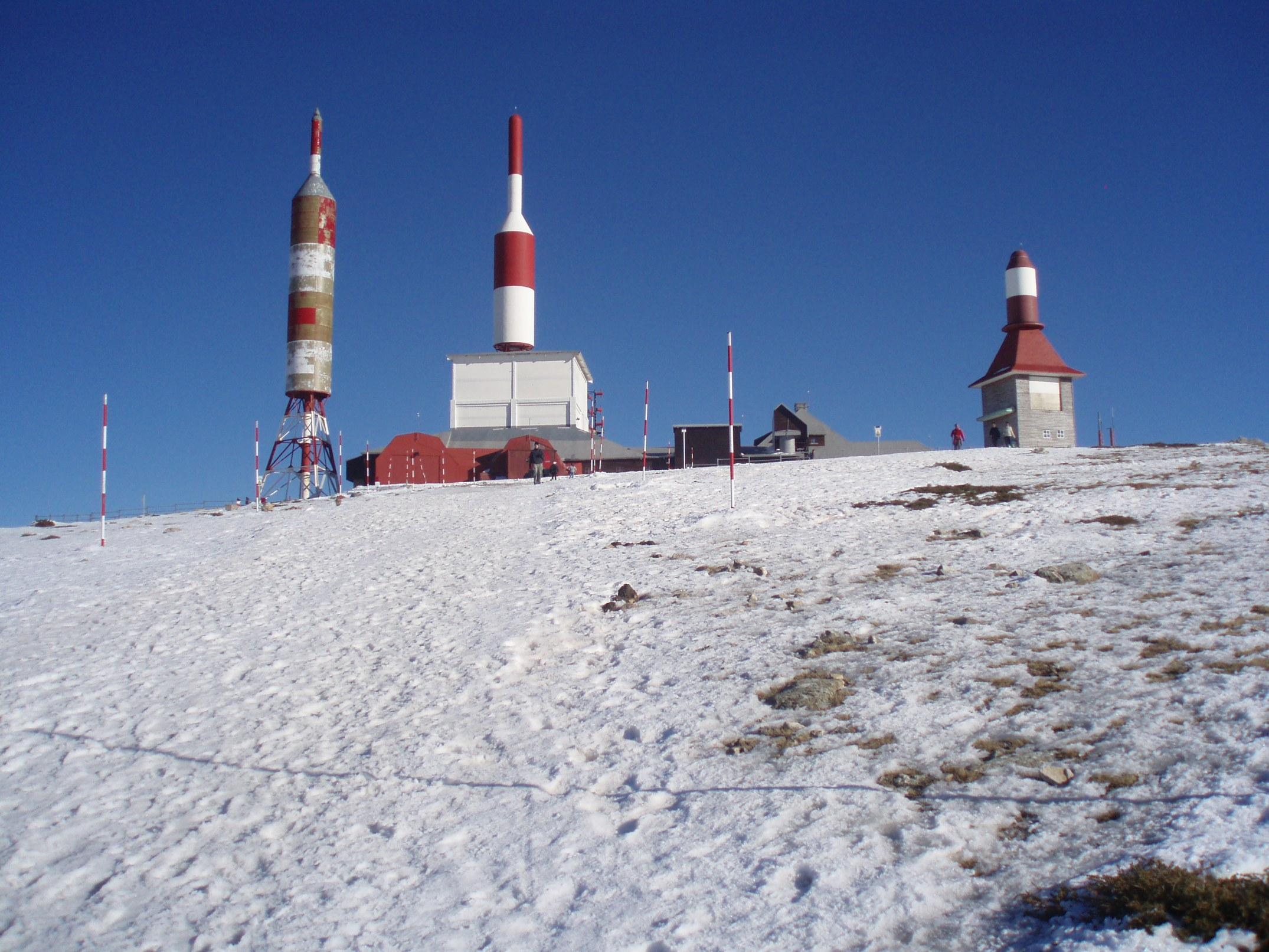
Antennas of the Bola del Mundo.

At its summit there are antennas, whose function was to broadcast the radio and television signal and send it to the two plateaus. In 2010, the Spanish Government decided to close the powerful television repeater of Navacerrada due to the analogical blackout, leaving it exclusively for the FM radio broadcasting of RNE 1 Madrid (104.9 MHz) RNE-CLAS (98.8 MHz), RNE Radio 3 (95.8 MHz) and Onda Madrid (106.0 MHz).

These three large antennas are covered by a heated radome in the shape of a rocket to protect them from the ice. They are visible from several kilometers around and constitute the greatest peculiarity of this mountain, which is easily accessible from the Navacerrada pass.

== Vuelta a España ==
The summit of Bola del Mundo has been the stage finish three times in the annual Grand Tour professional cycling road race Vuelta a España: in 2010, 2012 and 2025. The geographical proximity to the Spanish capital Madrid, traditionally the finish of the final stage of the Vuelta, as well as the demanding climb up to the top potentially being decisive for the overall result of the race, has meant that the organizers all three times have integrated the Bola del Mundo into the end of the parcour of the penultimate stage.

The length and average gradient of the climb varies depending on the starting point of the ascent and the route up to the top of Bola del Mundo. Regardless of which specific route is used, Bola del Mundo is considered one of the toughest climbs in the Vuelta a España's recurring repertoire.

The 20th and penultimate stage of the 2010 Vuelta finished at the summit of Bola del Mundo on September 18, introducing the climb into the Spanish Grand Tour. Spanish cyclist Ezequiel Mosquera of team Xacobeo–Galicia was first to pass the finish line, with Italian red jersey-holder Vincenzo Nibali of Liquigas one second behind. Ezequiel Mosquera was announced on September 30 to have given positive tests for hydroxyethyl starch during the race, a substance which is known as a masking agent for erythropoietin (EPO). All results from Mosquera after stage 15 were annulled, including his win at the Bola del Mundo, making Nibali the winner of the stage. However, this was later overturned by a Spanish court, making once again Mosquera the official winner of the stage.

In the 2012 edition of the Vuelta, on September 8, Russian cyclist Denis Menchov of team Katusha won the penultimate 20th stage finishing at the Bola del Mundo. Spanish cyclist Alberto Contador of team Saxo Bank–SunGard successfully defended the red jersey.

On September 13, 2025 Bola del Mundo was the final climb and stage finish of the 20th and penultimate stage of the 2025 edition of the Vuelta a España. Danish cyclist Jonas Vingegaard of team Visma–Lease a Bike won the stage and defended the red jersey.

== See also ==
- Ventisquero de la Condesa
- Cuerda Larga
- Puerto de Cotos
