= Praga Bridge =

Bridge in Spain

Praga Bridge Puente de Praga
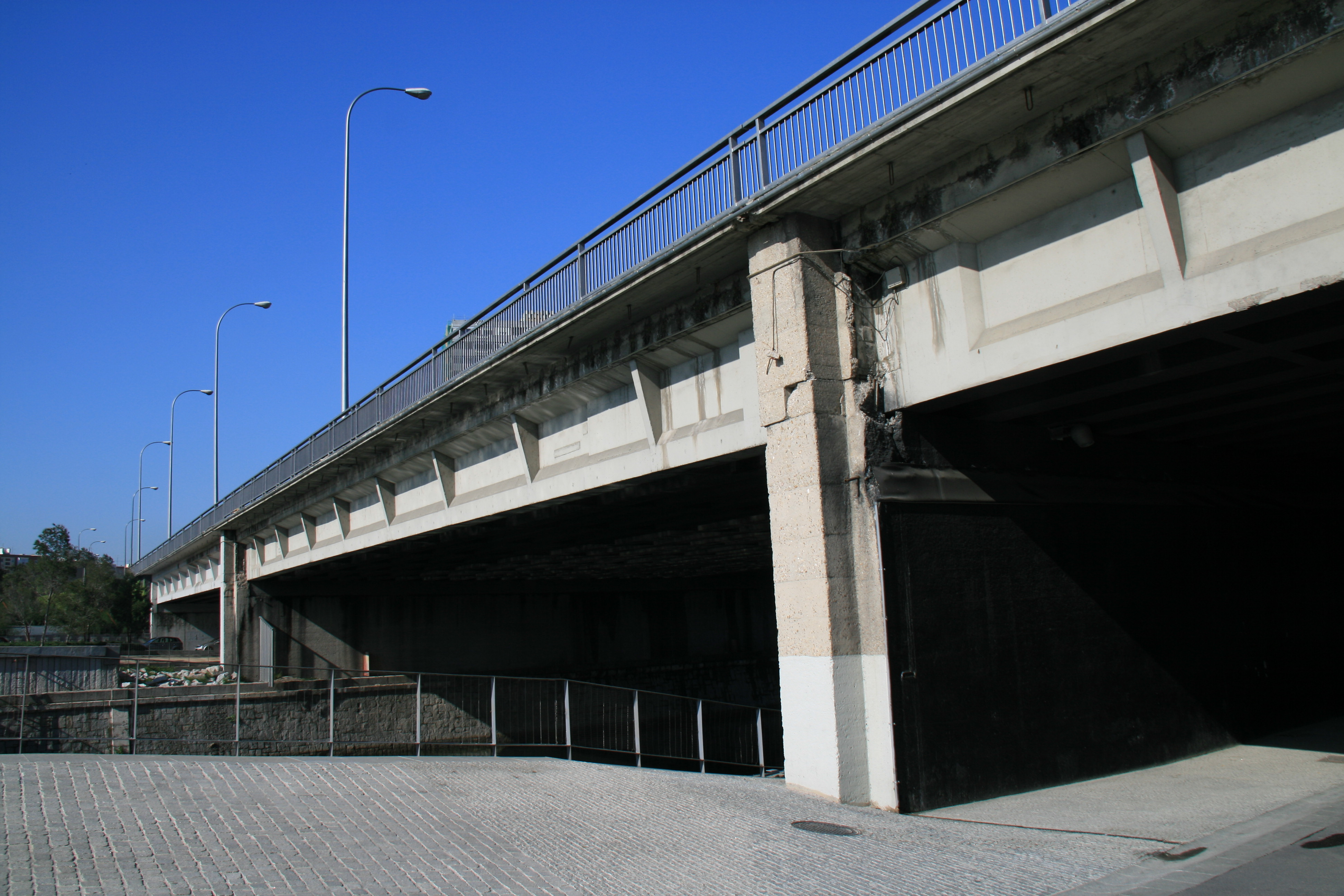
- Coordinates: 40°23′42″N 3°42′17″W
- Crosses: Manzanares
- Locale: Madrid, Spain

Characteristics
- Design: Beam bridge
- Longest span: 45 m

History
- Opened: 11 October 1968

The Praga Bridge (Spanish: Puente de Praga, after the city of Prague) is a bridge in Madrid, Spain. Crossing over the Manzanares, it is part of the Paseo de Santa María de la Cabeza, that eventually becomes the A-42 (the motorway to Toledo) south of the river.

== History and description ==
An original bridge built circa 1925 was chiefly used for the transport of cattle to the slaughterhouse (Matadero) of Legazpi, so it was informally known as puente del Matadero. In 1932, the Ayuntamiento de Madrid determined to name it after the city of Prague (Praga in Spanish).

However, building works for a new bridge started in the 1940s. Upon the time for the inauguration of the second bridge, it was determined it would be named puente de los Héroes del Alcázar de Toledo, yet pretty much everybody stuck to the Praga name of the old bridge. It was finally opened to traffic in the Summer of 1952. As there were problems in the foundation works and the quality of the materials was deficient, authorities determined the demolition of the bridge in 1964, to replace it by a new one. The bridge was progressively dismantled as the new one was being built, and the formal unveiling of the third version of the bridge took place on 11 October 1968.

The new (third) bridge consisted of four straight sections of prestressed concrete, with about 45 m of maximum span, and with a board supported by 8 longitudinal beams (with a height of 2.70 m) per section. Aside from the board the longitudinal beams are also braced by crossbeams.

In 2009 the bridge was officially renamed to Puente de Praga, as still nobody knew the bridge by the Héroes del Alcázar de Toledo name, and the Praga name already was featured even in city guides and street maps.
