= Becerril de la Sierra =

Coordinates: 40°43′N 3°59′W

- Municipality
- Flag Coat of arms

- Municipal location within the Community of Madrid.
- Country: Spain
- Autonomous community: Community of Madrid

Area
  - Total: 11.72 sq mi (30.35 km^{2})

Population (2025-01-01)
  - Total: 6,737
- Time zone: UTC+1 (CET)
  - Summer (DST): UTC+2 (CEST)

Becerril de la Sierra (Spanish pronunciation: [beθeˈril de la ˈsjera]) is a municipality of the autonomous community of Madrid in central Spain.

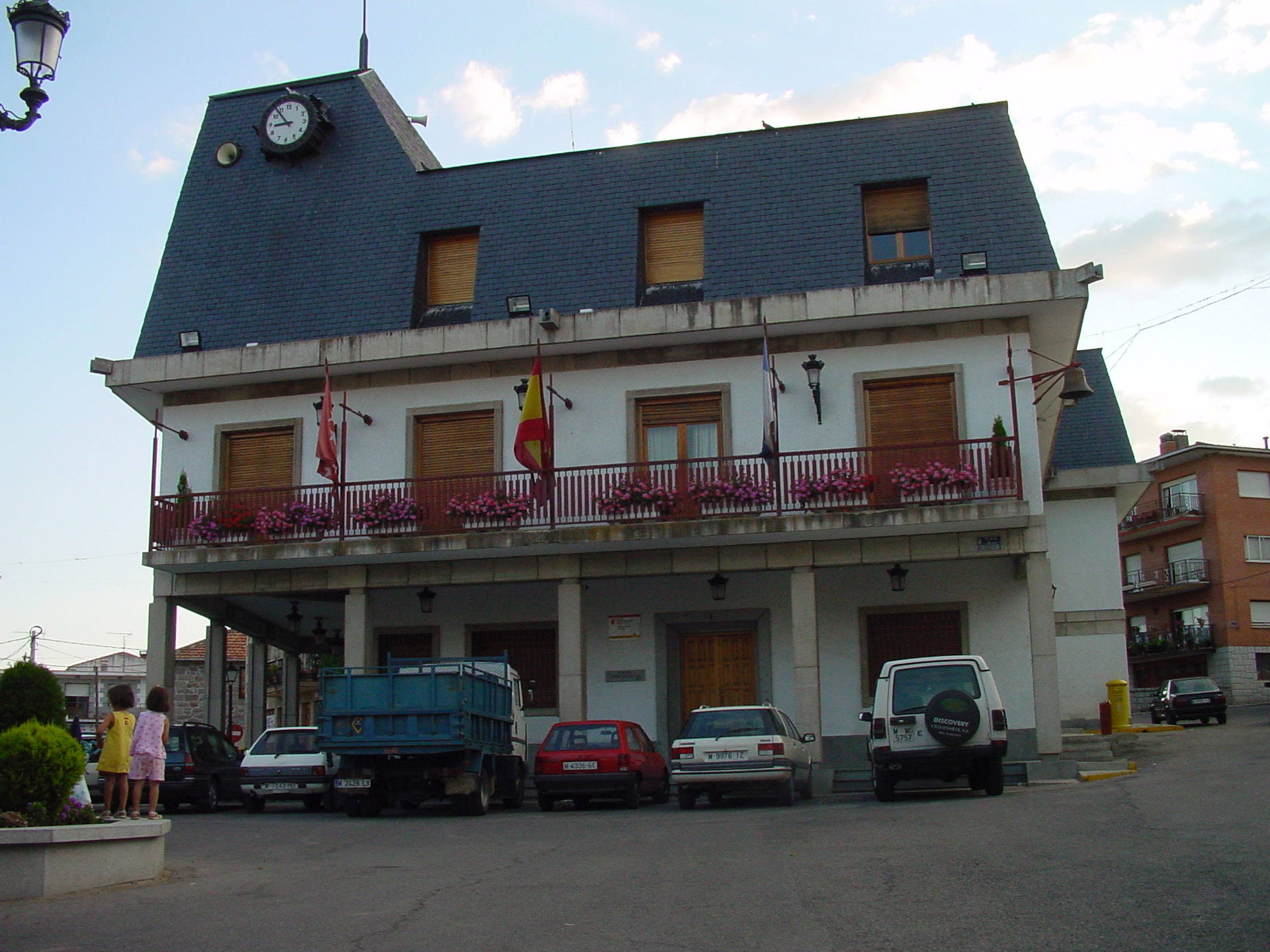
City Hall

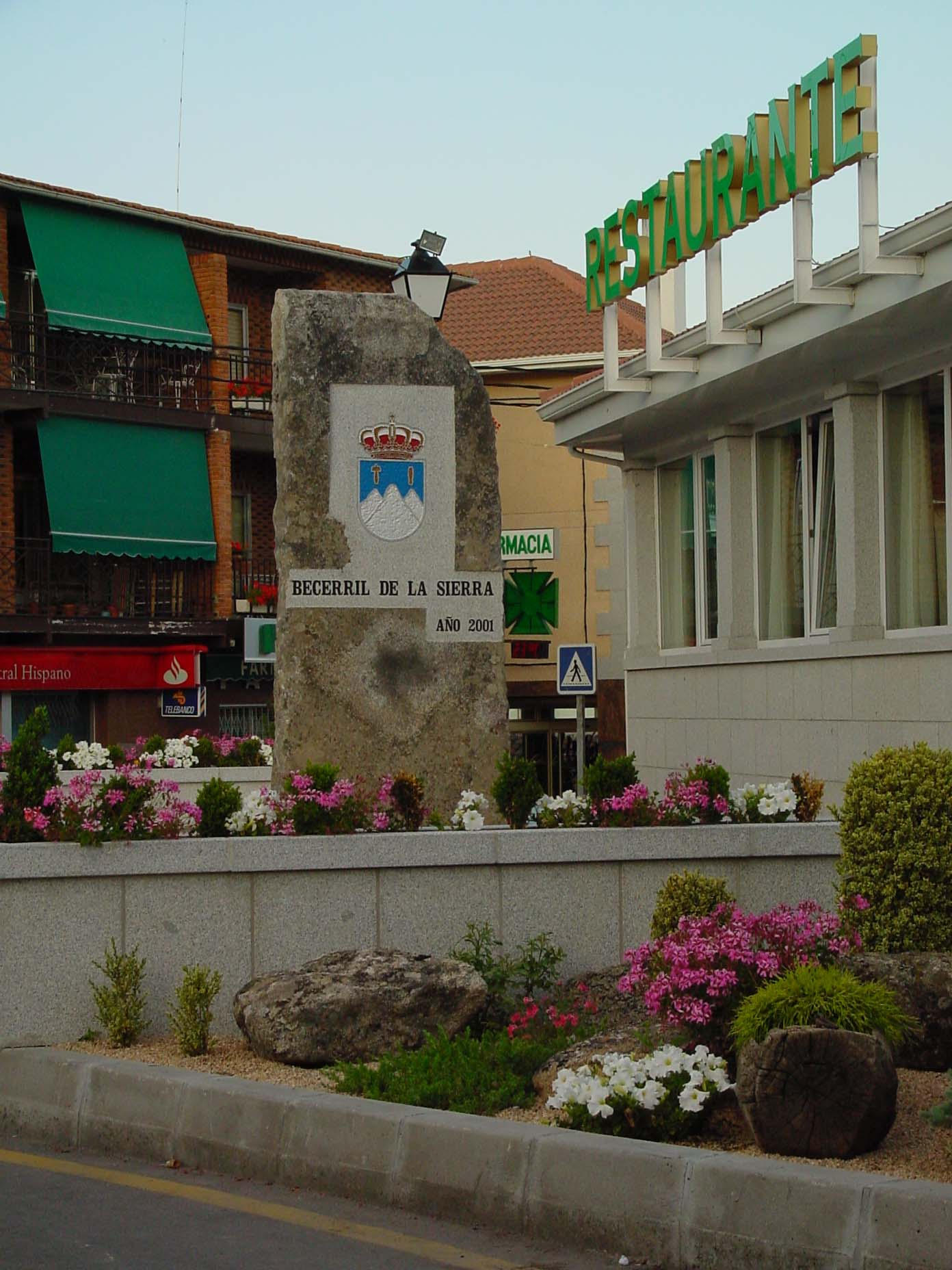
Shield of Becerril de la Sierra

== Bus ==
- 690: Guadarrama - Collado Mediano - Navacerrada
- 691: Madrid (Moncloa) - Becerril - Navacerrada - Vadesquí
- 696: Collado Villalba (hospital) - Navacerrada
- 724: El Boalo - Manzanares el Real - Colmenar Viejo - Madrid (Plaza de Castilla) (Only the services that come from El Boalo, and only on the way back to Madrid, not on the way to El Boalo)
