= Collado Mediano =

Coordinates: 40°41′38″N 4°1′23″W

- Municipality
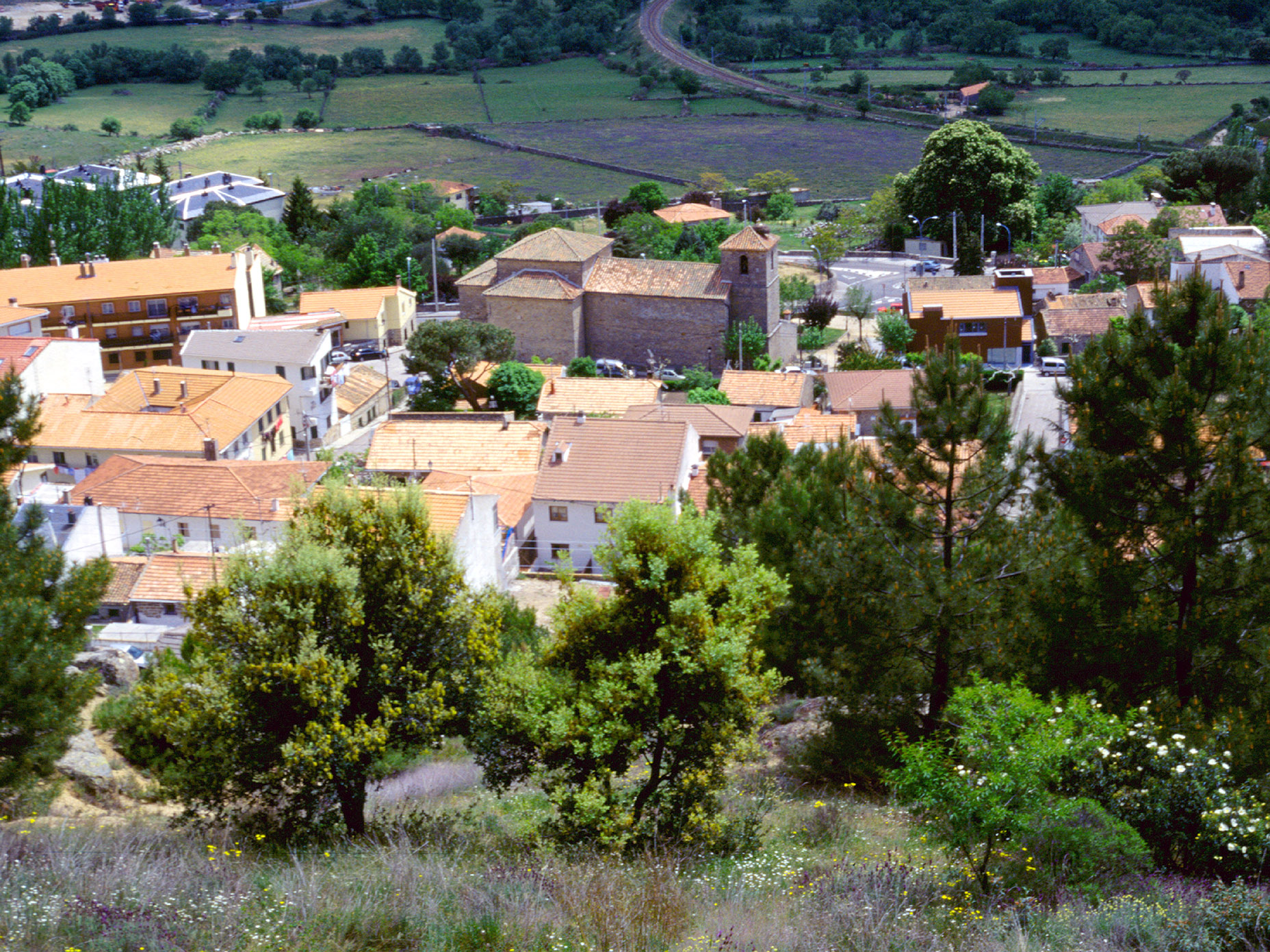

- Coat of arms

- Country: Spain
- Region: Community of Madrid

Area
  - Total: 22.57 km^{2} (8.71 sq mi)
- Elevation: 1,032 m (3,386 ft)

Population (2025-01-01)
  - Total: 7,722
  - Density: 342.1/km^{2} (886.1/sq mi)
- Time zone: UTC+1 (CET)
  - Summer (DST): UTC+2 (CEST)

Collado Mediano is a town and municipality in the north-west of the Community of Madrid, Spain. It had a population of 6,610 in 2011 and is located 48 km from Madrid. The municipality covers an area of 22.57 km^{2}. Located near the Sierra de Guadarrama, it lies at 1,032 metres above sea level.

== Geography ==
A town located in the Guadarrama mountains, 48 km north-west from Madrid, Spain's Capital city. The town is crossed by the following roads: M-601, M623 and M621. The town has developed in a straight line, across the valley and is surrounded by mountains and little forests in the low and middle parts of the mountains. The climate is cold in winter and hot in summer.

== History ==
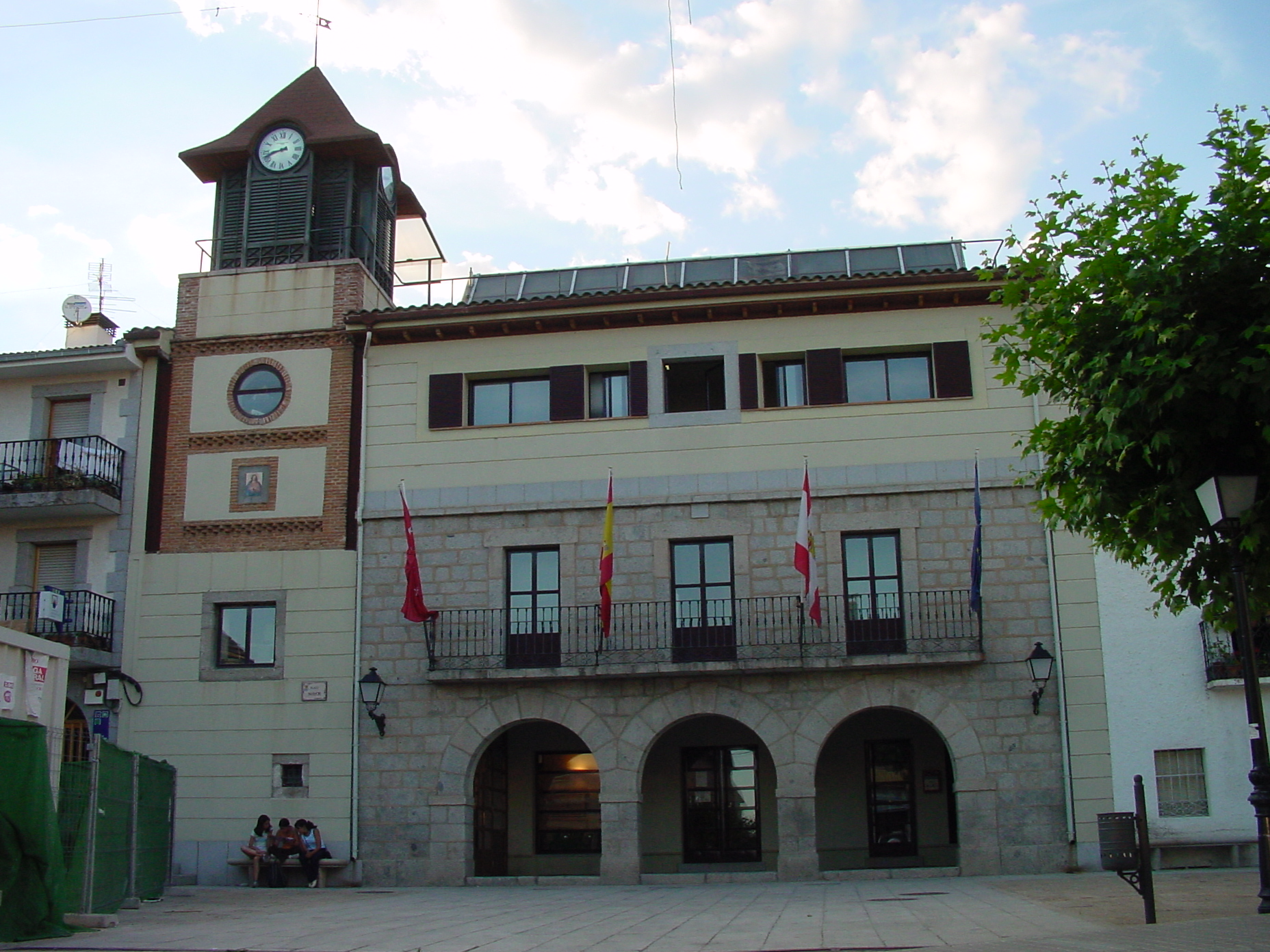
City Hall

The earliest inhabitation dates back to the time of the Roman Empire in the Iberian Peninsula. During the Middle Ages, the town was influenced by the city of Segovia. The town became a "villa" in the year 1630. Also, there are still remains of military trenches from the Spanish civil war of 1936.

The town "insignia" is the "Cobañera" (which appears in the town's coat of arms), a natural monument, made of rocks, forming a triangle. The "Cobañera" can be seen lit up at night.

== Economy ==
In the past, agriculture and farming were very important, however in modern times they have been superseded by the service sector.

== Adoptive Sons and Daughters ==
- Carlos Saura (2023; posthumous)

== Others ==
The former world chess champion Viswanathan Anand and his wife Aruna live in Collado Mediano.
