= Navacerrada Dam =

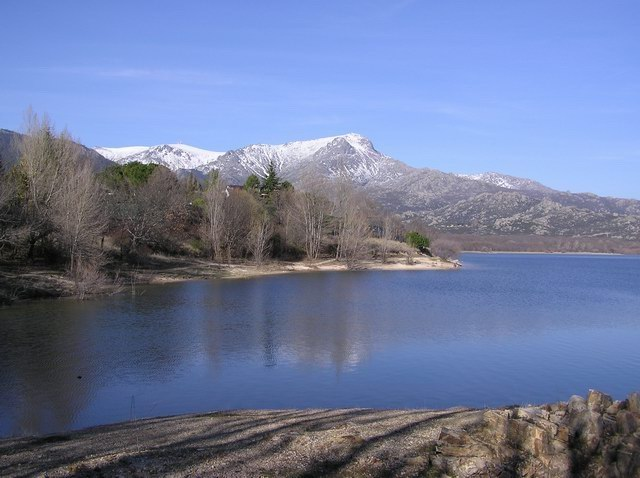

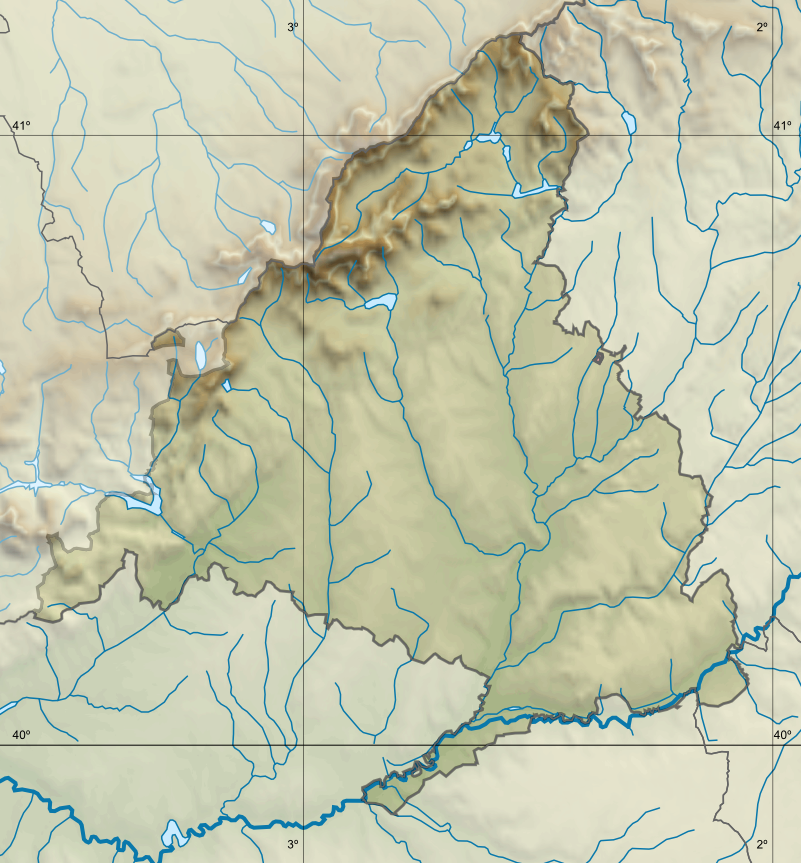
- Location within Community of Madrid
- Location: Navacerrada, Community of Madrid
- Coordinates: 40.7184°N 4.0072°W
- Type: reservoir
- Part of: Tagus Basin
- Basin countries: Spain
- Surface area: 93 ha (230 acres)
- Surface elevation: 1,200 m (3,900 ft)

Navacerrada Dam is a reservoir in Navacerrada in the Community of Madrid, Spain. At an elevation of 1200 m, its maximum surface area is 93 hectares (230 acres).
