= Navacerrada Pass =

Mountain pass in Spain

- Puerto de Navacerrada
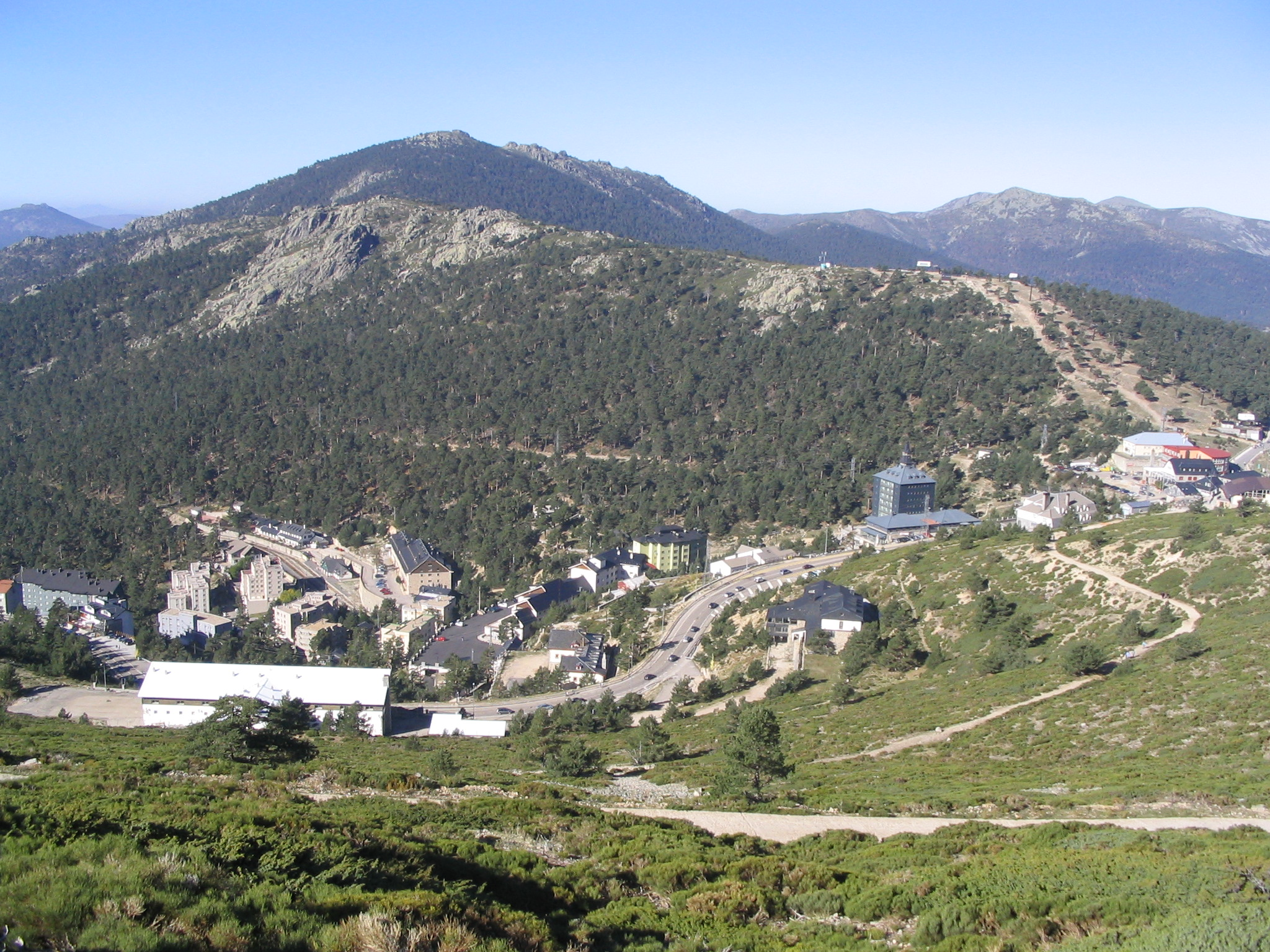

- Location within Spain
- Elevation: 1,858 metres (6,096 ft)

Third Approach
- Location: Province of Segovia, Community of Madrid
- Range: Sierra de Guadarrama
- Coordinates: 40°47′19″N 4°0′12″W

The Navacerrada Pass (Spanish: Puerto de Navacerrada [ˈpweɾto ðe naβaθeˈraða]) is a mountain pass in the Guadarrama Mountains, in the centre of the Iberian Peninsula.

In 1788, it replaced the Fuenfría Pass as mountain pass in the route crossing the Sierra de Guadarrama connecting the Spanish cities of Madrid and Segovia. The saddle point lies at 1,858 metres over sea level. It is located in the border between the province of Segovia and the Community of Madrid. The route consists of the M-601 road in the Madrilenian side and the CL-601 in the segovian side. As of 2019, several of the Alpine buildings erected in the surroundings are derelict.

== Climate ==
The climate type of Navacerrada Pass is humid continental climate (Köppen: Dsb), close to the mediterranean climate (Köppen: Csb), with cold and rainy winters and cool to warm dry summers. Snow is common during the winter.

Climate data for Puerto de Navacerrada, altitude 1893m, (1991–2020 normals, extremes 1946–present)
Month	Jan	Feb	Mar	Apr	May	Jun	Jul	Aug	Sep	Oct	Nov	Dec	Year
Record high °C (°F)	18.3 (64.9)	16.8 (62.2)	18.9 (66.0)	22.6 (72.7)	25.4 (77.7)	32.0 (89.6)	33.4 (92.1)	32.8 (91.0)	30.8 (87.4)	23.9 (75.0)	20.4 (68.7)	17.0 (62.6)	33.4 (92.1)
Mean daily maximum °C (°F)	2.8 (37.0)	3.2 (37.8)	5.9 (42.6)	8.0 (46.4)	12.7 (54.9)	18.7 (65.7)	23.0 (73.4)	22.8 (73.0)	17.4 (63.3)	11.2 (52.2)	5.5 (41.9)	3.8 (38.8)	11.3 (52.3)
Daily mean °C (°F)	−0.1 (31.8)	0.1 (32.2)	2.4 (36.3)	4.2 (39.6)	8.3 (46.9)	13.7 (56.7)	17.4 (63.3)	17.3 (63.1)	12.8 (55.0)	7.8 (46.0)	2.8 (37.0)	1.1 (34.0)	7.3 (45.2)
Mean daily minimum °C (°F)	−2.9 (26.8)	−2.9 (26.8)	−1.1 (30.0)	0.3 (32.5)	3.9 (39.0)	8.6 (47.5)	11.7 (53.1)	11.8 (53.2)	8.2 (46.8)	4.3 (39.7)	0.0 (32.0)	−1.7 (28.9)	3.3 (38.0)
Record low °C (°F)	−18.2 (−0.8)	−18.6 (−1.5)	−14.7 (5.5)	−11.0 (12.2)	−8.0 (17.6)	−3.4 (25.9)	0.0 (32.0)	0.2 (32.4)	−3.0 (26.6)	−7.6 (18.3)	−11.8 (10.8)	−20.3 (−4.5)	−20.3 (−4.5)
Average precipitation mm (inches)	143 (5.6)	118.6 (4.67)	118.2 (4.65)	127.5 (5.02)	119.8 (4.72)	51.2 (2.02)	18.1 (0.71)	30.7 (1.21)	61.1 (2.41)	169.6 (6.68)	173.9 (6.85)	149.9 (5.90)	1,281.6 (50.44)
Average precipitation days (≥ 1.0 mm)	11.9	10.5	10.7	12.1	11.6	6.1	2.8	3.3	6.7	11.7	13.3	12.1	112.8
Average snowy days	12.6	12.1	10.7	9.8	3.9	0.4	0	0	0.3	2.5	8.7	10.1	71.1
Average relative humidity (%)	80	79	75	76	70	57	45	47	62	78	84	80	69
Mean monthly sunshine hours	105	116	158	177	229	297	353	326	219	152	96	99	2,327
Percentage possible sunshine	35	39	43	44	51	66	77	77	58	44	33	34	50
Source: Agencia Estatal de Meteorología

== See also ==
- C-9 (Cercanías Madrid)
