= Spanish royal sites =

Palaces, monasteries and convents

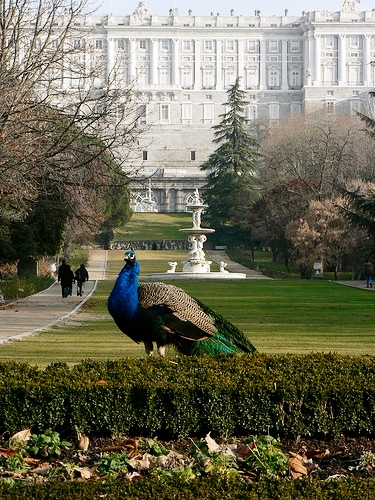
Royal Palace of Madrid, the official residence of the king

The Royal Sites (Spanish: Reales Sitios) are a set of palaces, monasteries, and convents built for and under the patronage of the Spanish monarchy. They are administered by Patrimonio Nacional (National Heritage), a Spanish state agency; most are open to the public, at least in part, except when they are needed for state or official events.

Here is a list of the Patrimonio Nacional royal sites, with the provinces where they are located.

== Royal palaces ==
- Royal Palace of Madrid (Madrid) (official residence of the King)
- Royal Seat of San Lorenzo de El Escorial (Royal Castle & Monastery of El Escorial (Madrid)
  - Cottage of the Prince
  - Cottage of the Infante
- Royal Palace of El Pardo (Madrid)
  - Palace of Zarzuela (Madrid) (de facto residence of the King and Royal Family, part of the larger El Pardo complex)
  - Cottage of the Prince
- Royal Palace of Aranjuez (Madrid)
  - Royal House of the Farmer

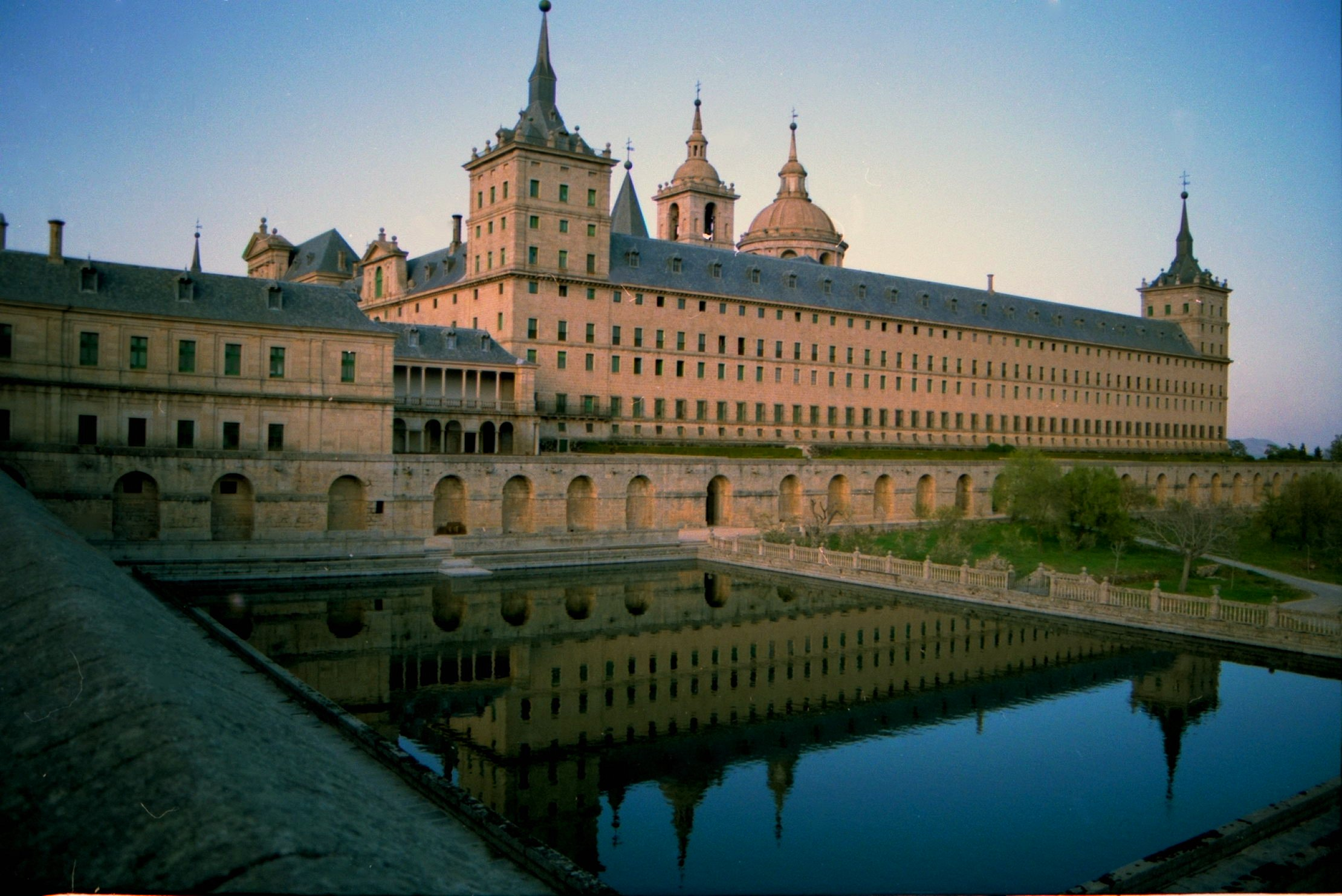
Palace of San Lorenzo de El Escorial

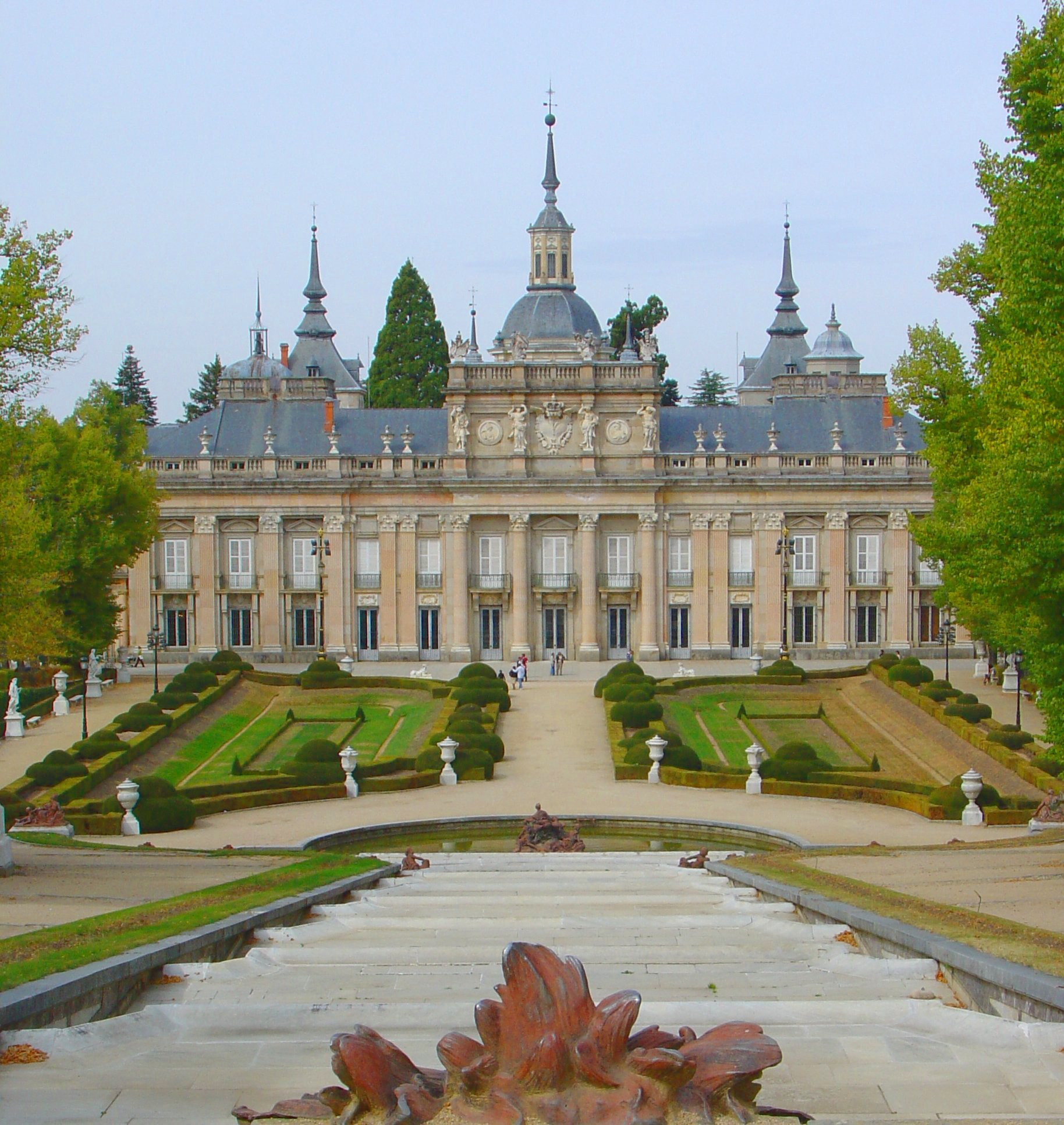
Royal Palace of La Granja de San Ildefonso

- Royal Palace of La Granja de San Ildefonso (Segovia)
- Royal Palace of Riofrío (Segovia)
- Royal Palace of La Almudaina (Palma de Mallorca, Balearic Islands)

== Royal convents and monasteries ==
- Convent of Las Descalzas Reales (Madrid)
- Royal Convent of La Encarnación (Madrid)
- Royal Convent of Santa Clara (Valladolid)
- Abbey of Santa Maria la Real de Huelgas (Burgos)
- Valley of the Fallen (San Lorenzo de El Escorial, Madrid)
- Royal Chapel of St. Anthony of La Florida (Madrid)
- Monastery of Yuste (Cuacos de Yuste, Cáceres)

== Sanctuaries under royal patronage ==
- Pantheon of Illustrious Men (Madrid)
- Convent of San Pascual (Madrid)
- Convent of Santa Isabel (Madrid)
- Colegio de Doncellas Nobles (Toledo)

== Other royal sites residences ==
These current or historical royal residences are well known but are not administered by Patrimonio Nacional:

- Royal Alcázar of Seville under the care of Patronato del Real Alcázar de Sevilla.
- Royal Alcázar of Segovia, administered by the Patronato del Alcázar de Segovia
- Palace of Albéniz (the King's official residence in Catalonia) in the city of Barcelona, under the care of Generalitat of Catalonia.
- Marivent Palace (the King's summer residence) in Palma de Mallorca, under the care of Government of the Balearic Islands.
- Valladolid Royal Palace (Valladolid, Castile)
- Royal Residence of La Mareta (Lanzarote, Canary Islands)
- San Jeronimo el Real, Church/Monastery, Madrid

== Former royal palaces ==
- Alcázar of Segovia
- Alhambra
- Aljafería
- Buen Retiro Palace
- Castle Alcázar of Segorbe
- Castle of Bellver
- Castle of Burgos
- Del Real Palace
- Generalife
- Palace of Charles V
- Palacio de la Ribera
- Palau Reial de Pedralbes
- Palau Reial Major
- Royal Alcazar of Madrid
- Royal Palace of Olite
- Palace of la Magdalena
- Miramar Palace
- Palace of Valsain
- Royal Palace of Valladolid
- Torre de la Parada
