= Riofrío =

Riofrío may refer to:

== Colombia ==
- Riofrío, Valle del Cauca, a municipality in the department of Valle del Cauca

== Spain ==
- Riofrío, Granada, a village in Loja, Andalusia
- Riofrío, Ávila, a municipality in Ávila, Castile and León
- Linares de Riofrío, a municipality in Salamanca, Castile and León
- Navas de Riofrío, a municipality in Segovia, Castile and León
- Riofrío de Riaza, a municipality in Segovia, Castile and León
- Riofrío de Aliste, a municipality in Zamora, Castile and León
- Riofrío del Llano, a municipality in Guadalajara, Castile-La Mancha
- Vallejera de Riofrío, a municipality in Salamanca, Castile and León
- Royal Palace of Riofrío, a royal palace in San Ildefonso, Segovia, Castile and León

== See also ==
- Rio Frio (disambiguation)
