= Palace of Albéniz =

Official residence of the Spanish royal family in Catalonia, Spain

Albéniz Palace
- Spanish: Palacete Albéniz; Catalan: Palauet Albéniz
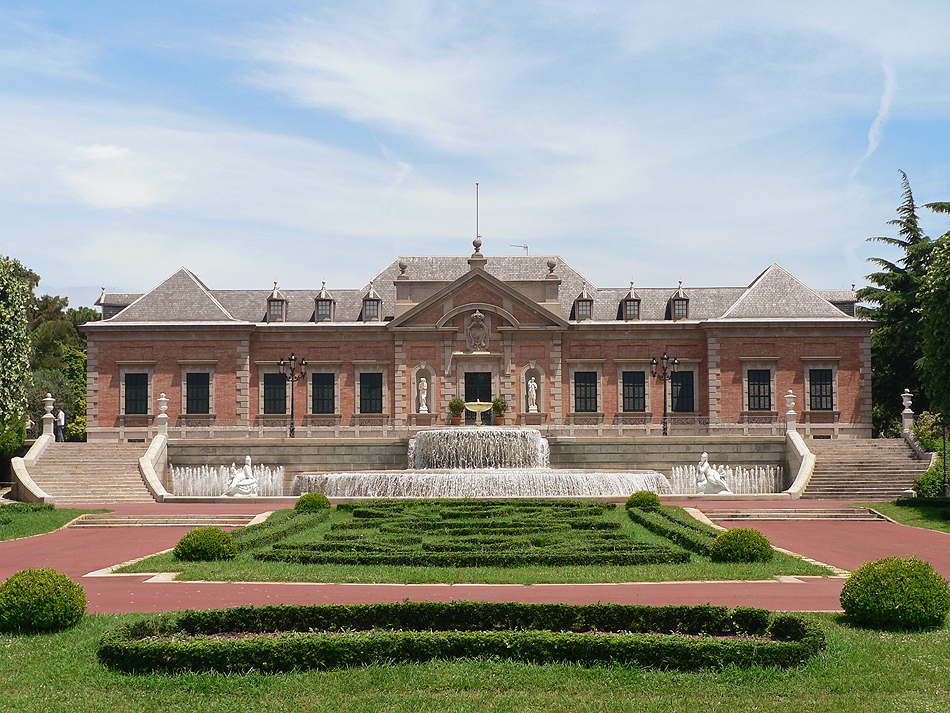
- Rear facade of the palace
- Interactive map of the Albéniz Palace area

General information
- Architectural style: Historicism, neo-Herrerian
- Location: Barcelona, Spain
- Coordinates: 41°22′02″N 02°09′20″E
- Construction started: 1928
- Completed: 1928
- Client: Spanish royal family
- Owner: City Council of Barcelona
- Management: Patrimonio Nacional

Design and construction
- Architect: Juan Moya Idígoras

The Palace of Albéniz (Spanish: Palacete Albéniz, Catalan: Palauet Albéniz), formerly known as the Royal Pavilion of Montjuic, is a palace located on the Montjuïc mountain, in Barcelona, Spain, that currently serves as the official residence of the Spanish royal family in the region.

Since its construction it has been adapted to its different functions: first, as a place of representation of the Crown during the 1929 Barcelona International Exposition and, after it, as accommodation for illustrious personalities. It has currently become the official residence of the Spanish royal family during their official stays in Catalonia.

== History ==
=== 1929 Exposition ===
The palace was built for the 1929 Barcelona International Exposition. Contrary to popular belief, the building did not serve as a royal residence, but housed the representation of the Royal Household. The royal family used it as a resting place, for light meals and tea, as well as to receive distinguished guests who visited the exposition. During the event, the sovereigns resided in the recently built Royal Palace of Pedralbes.

The design of the pavilion was carried out by the architect of the Royal House, Juan Moya Idígoras (1867–1953). For this reason, although the buildings in the exhibition were not characterized by their stylistic homogeneity, the building stood out because it did not follow the guidelines of the Mediterranean and Catalan architecture of most of the palaces and pavilions in the Exposition, but was closer to Bourbon tastes and the aesthetics of Royal Sites.

The official inauguration, in the presence of King Alfonso XIII, Queen Victoria Eugenie of Battenberg, the infantas and other authorities, took place on 5 October 1929.

=== After the exposition ===
In 1930, once the exposition was over, it was proposed to locate the Barcelona Music Museum in the palace. The project did not prosper but the Board of Museums proposed the construction and placement of a bust in honor of the musician, composer and pianist Isaac Albéniz. The City Council gave its approval and from that moment the Royal Pavilion of Montjuic has been known as the Palacete or Palauet Albéniz. This bust was sculpted by the Enric Casanovas and Mateu Fernández Soto.

After remaining closed and unoccupied during the Second Republic and the Civil War, in 1952, the palace served as accommodation for cardinal Angelo Dell'Acqua, Pontifical Legate, who came to Barcelona for the XXXV Eucharistic congress. In 1957, Mayor Josep Maria de Porcioles i Colomer decided to convert the building into accommodation for distinguished visitors, including Prince Constantine of Greece, Richard Nixon, William Tubman, Habib Bourguiba, Cardinal Eugène Tisserant and Christian Pineau.

From 1965 to 1970, the Barcelona City Council decided to remodel and expand the palace, and awarded the project to the local architects Joaquim Ros de Ramis, Antoni Lozoya and Ignasi Serra Goday. With the addition of the two new wings, the old quadrangular-shaped pavilion became the current shape of a capital "T".

Mayor Porcioles decided that the interior be decorated with paintings by the most representative artists of contemporary Catalan art, such as Ramon Martí Alsina, Ramon Casas, Joaquin Mir Trinxet or Santiago Rusiñol, among others, as well as with furniture from the personal collection of Luis Plandiura, a famous Barcelona collector. The renovation also included the creation of a dome with paintings by Salvador Dalí that evoke culture and the city and another with a stained glass window by Carlos Muñoz de Pablos.

The demolition of the nearby Palace of the Missions and Palace of Modern Art also allowed for the extension of the gardens, which received the name of Joan Maragall gardens in honor of the Spanish poet. The new building was inaugurated by Francisco Franco on 23 June 1970.

The first guests of the renovated palace were the princes Juan Carlos de Borbón and Sofía de Grecia in February 1971, who, after their accession to the throne in 1975, preferred to use the Albéniz Palace as their official residence in the city instead of the Royal Palace of Pedralbes. Their son, King Felipe VI, and his wife, Queen Letizia, also prefer Albéniz to Pedralbes.

== The palace ==
It was built with brick and stone framing the windows, doors and corners and its roofs are made of slate. Its exterior appearance has strong influences from Herrerian architecture, such as the Palacio de Santa Cruz or the Palacio de los Concejos. On the other hand, the original quadrangular plan of the pavilion is inspired by the Palace of Zarzuela or the Casita del Infante in El Escorial, both of them inspired by the Bolognese villa model of Serlio. Despite the changes and extensions that it has undergone due to its different uses, it can be said that the building retains its original characteristics.

For the 1929 exposition, the interior of the building was decorated with armors from the Royal Armoury and tapestries and confectioners from the Royal Tapestry Factory and the royal collections, some of them woven according to Goya's cartoons. Also, several rooms of the pavilion, both in decoration and furniture, were reproductions of others existing in the Royal Sites. During the 1960s, several paintings by contemporary local artists were added to its interiors, such as Martí Alsina, Casas, Josep de Togores or Vayreda, as well as furniture from the personal collection of Luis Plandiura.

=== Interior ===
The palace is accessed through a large wrought iron gate crowned by a royal coat of arms and flanked by two lions that come from the Royal Palace of Pedralbes. The rooms can be divided into two parts according to the period in which they were built.

==== Old rooms ====
It corresponds to the quadrangular pavilion built during the Universal Exposition by the architect of the Royal House, Juan Moya Idígoras.

- Entrance hall: its most remarkable element is the dome painted by Dalí in the 1960s, which represents an allegory of the sardana, with references to the first man to walk on the Moon, the Montserrat mountain or the Sagrada Família. Historical figures linked to Barcelona are represented on the pendentives: Ramon Llull, Joan Maragall, Christopher Columbus and Miguel de Cervantes.
- Hall of Goya or Tapestries: it is inspired by several rooms of the Royal Palace of El Pardo and receives its name from the tapestries woven according to the Goya cartoons destined, precisely, for the aforementioned palace.
- Yellow Hall or Ramón Casas Hall: this room, originally used as a dining room, is a copy of the Yellow Hall in the Casita del Príncipe in El Pardo. Particularly noteworthy is the elaborate ceiling, the Empire-style chairs and the paintings and drawings by Ramon Casas, among others.
- Hall of Mirrors: the small cabinet and its Carlos IV-style furniture reproduce the famous King's Dressing Room in the Royal Palace of Aranjuez.
- Official Office: all the furniture in this room (chairs and armchairs, desk and bookcases) stand out for their elaborate marquetry. They are from the Alfonsine period and come from the Plandiura Collection. The palace visitors' book is kept in this room.
- Corridor: previously it was the rear exit of the pavilion; currently it serves as a link between the old and the new part.
- Golden Room: it is especially sumptuous due to the combination of agate-colored marble and golden cornices, scrolls and garlands. Its most remarkable furnishings are the chandeliers supported by caryatids and the 17th-century cabinet with ivory inlays.
- Hall of the Busts: it receives its name from the four busts located in the corners that represent two Roman emperors and the goddesses Diana and Selene. The late-baroque ceiling with golden stuccoes is inspired by those made in the Royal Palace of La Granja de San Ildefonso during the reign of Philip V.
- Circus: it is located in the center of the mansion, it is covered with Italian marble and decorated with tapestries from the 18th century owned by the City Council. Above all, the dome of polychrome crystals stands out, designed in the 1960s by Juan de Contreras y López de Ayala, 9th Marquis of Lozoya and executed by Carlos Muñoz de Pablos, its design is based on one from the time of Ferdinand VII, although in this case the Greek dance was replaced by a sardana.
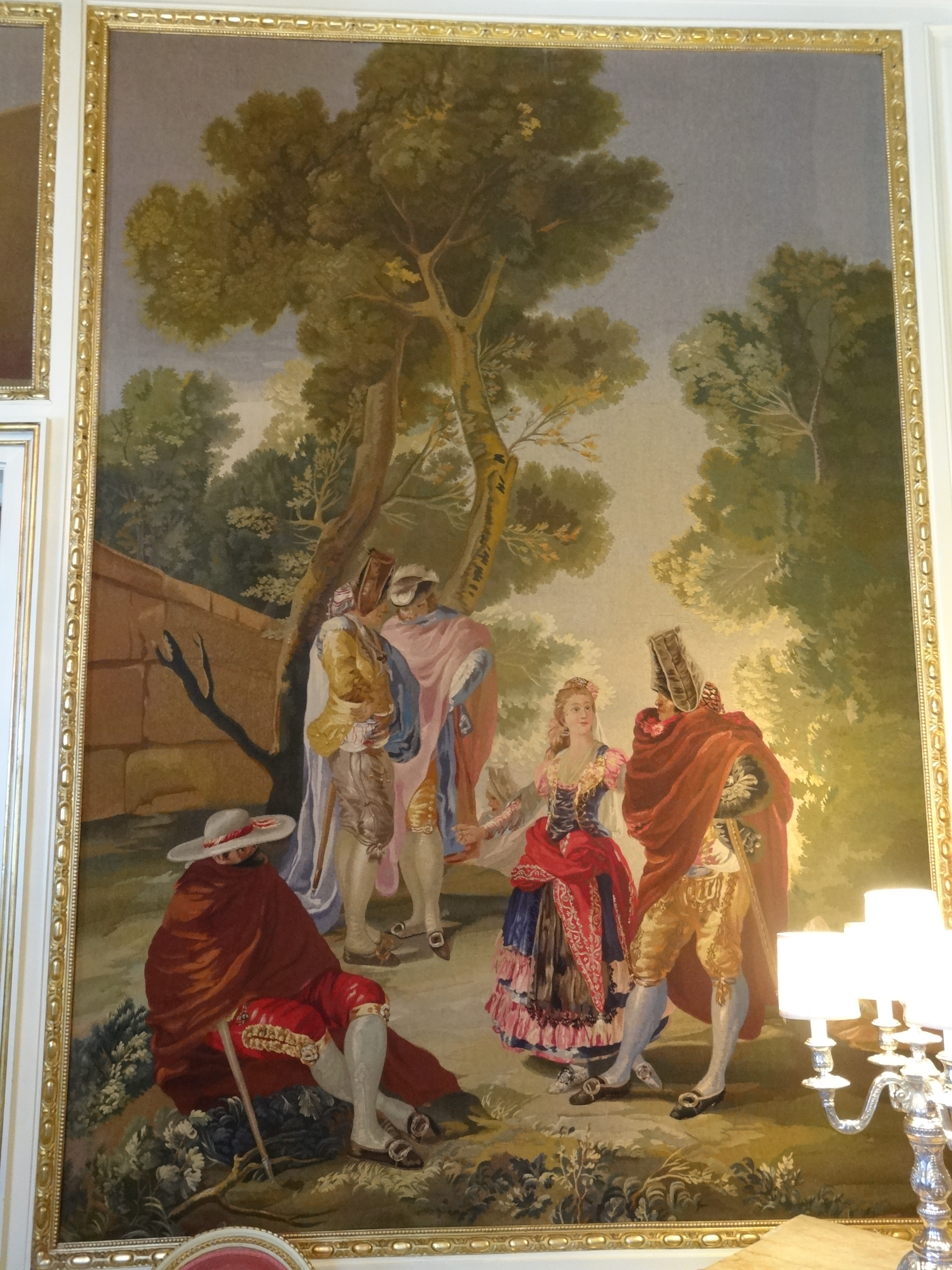
Goya Hall

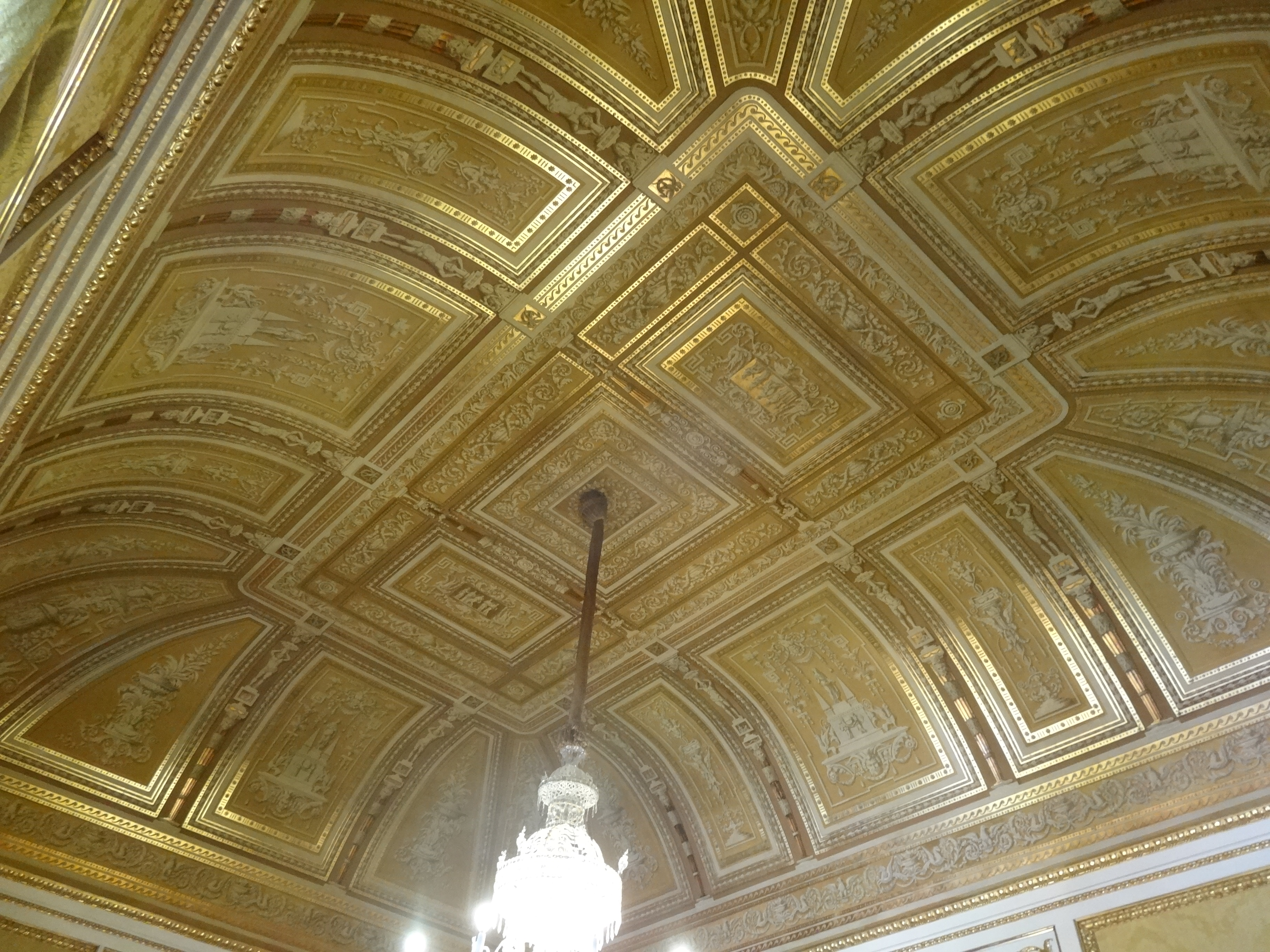
Yellow Hall

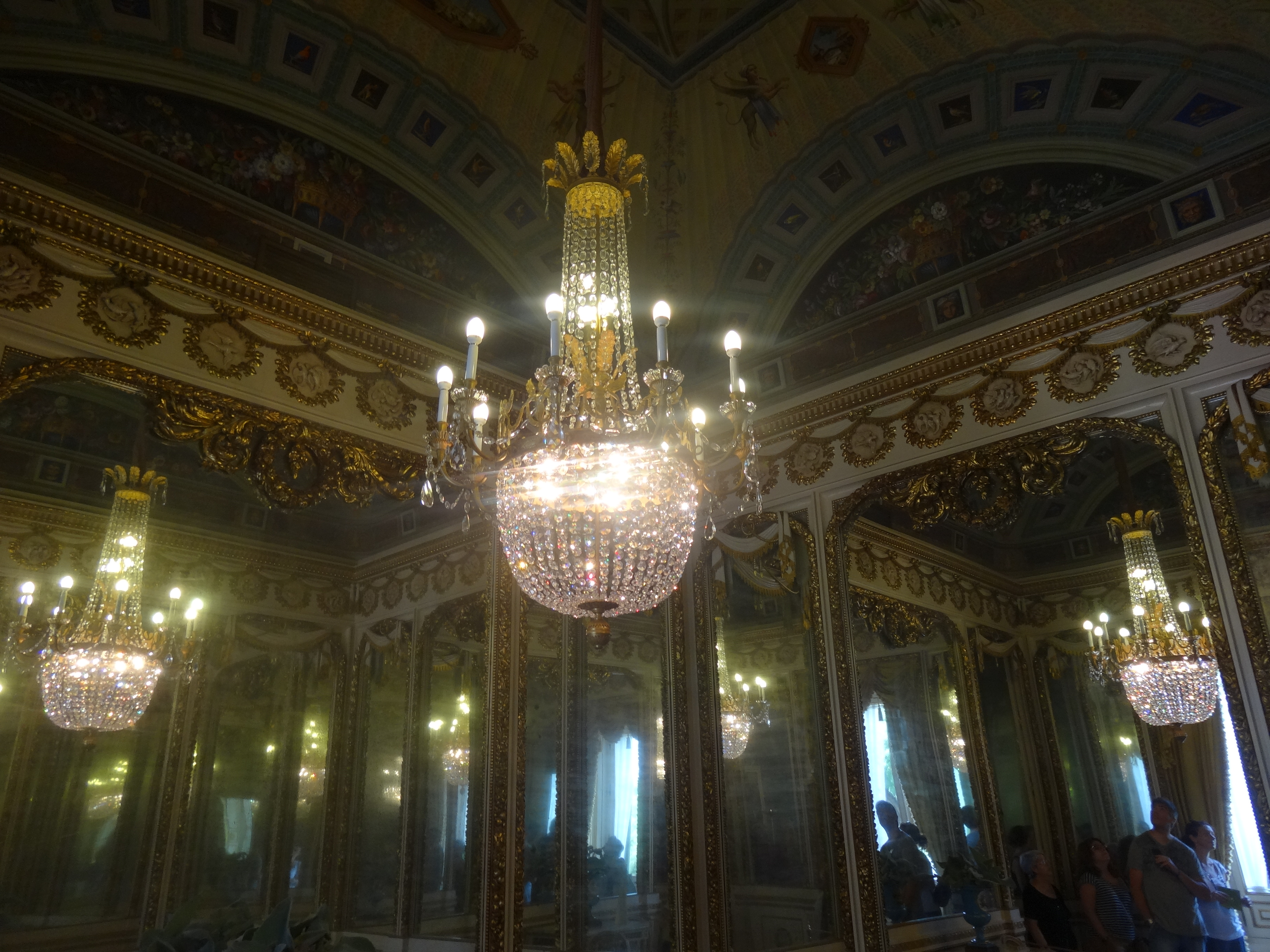
Hall of Mirrors

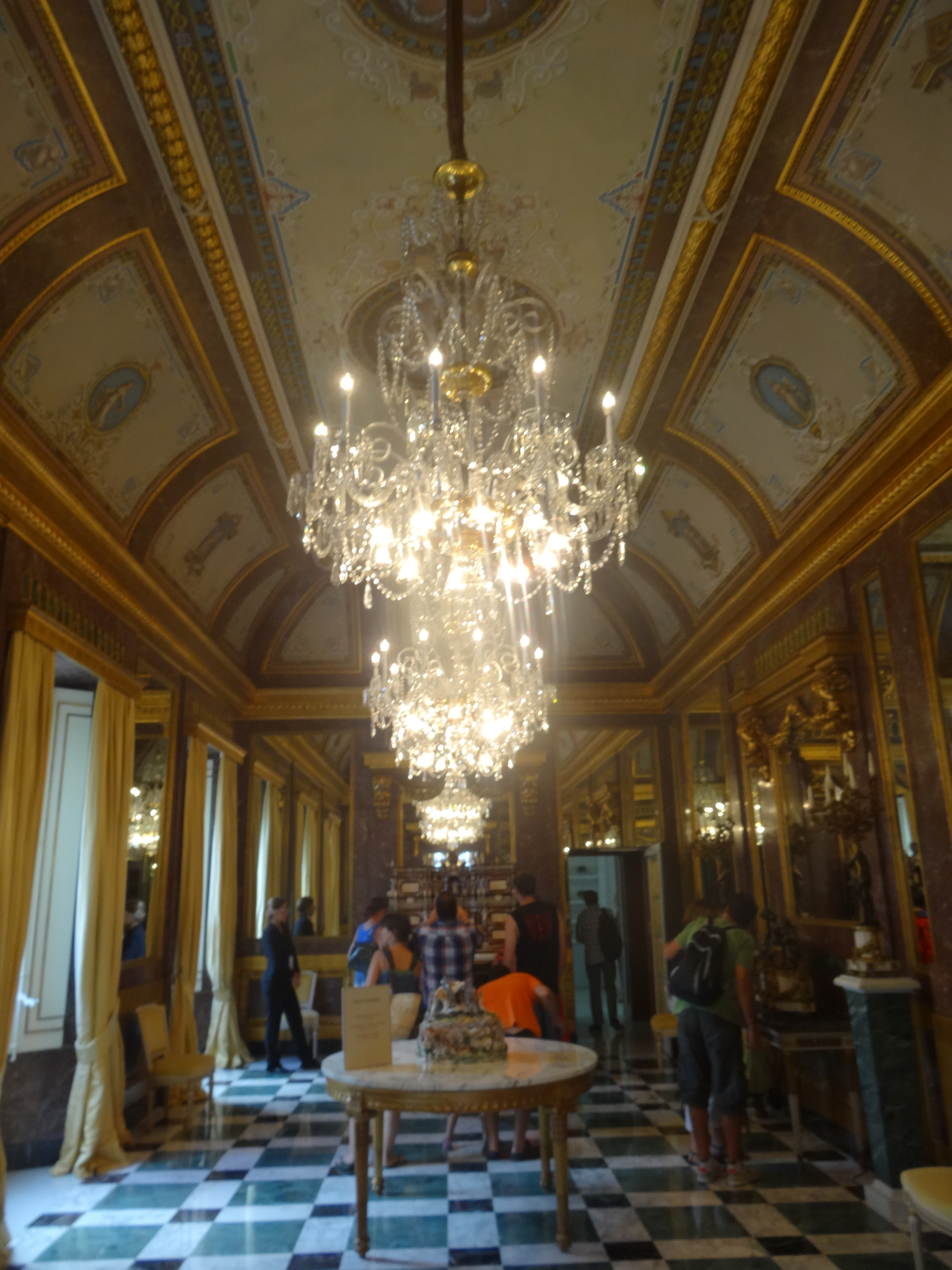
Golden Room

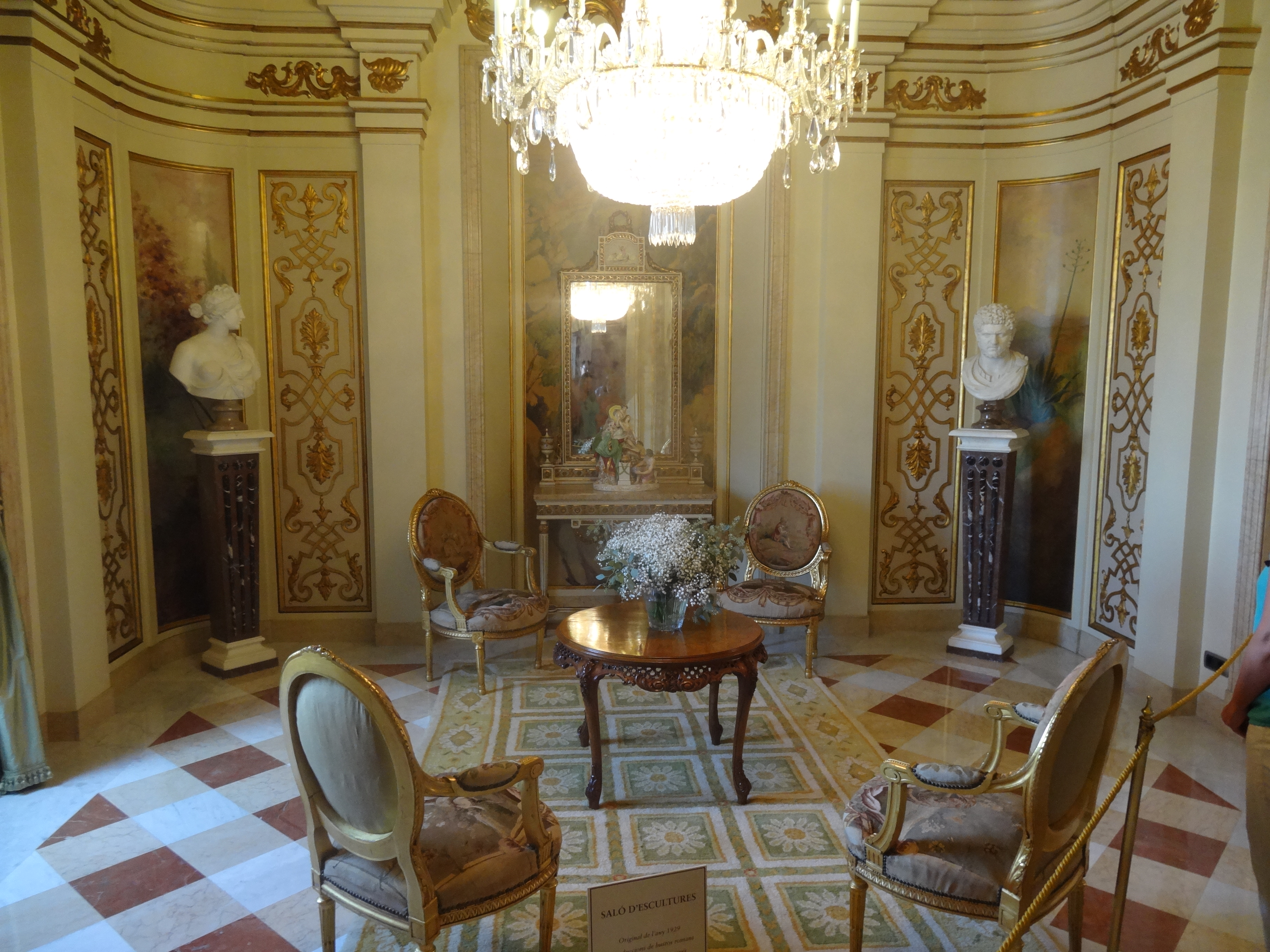
Hall of Busts

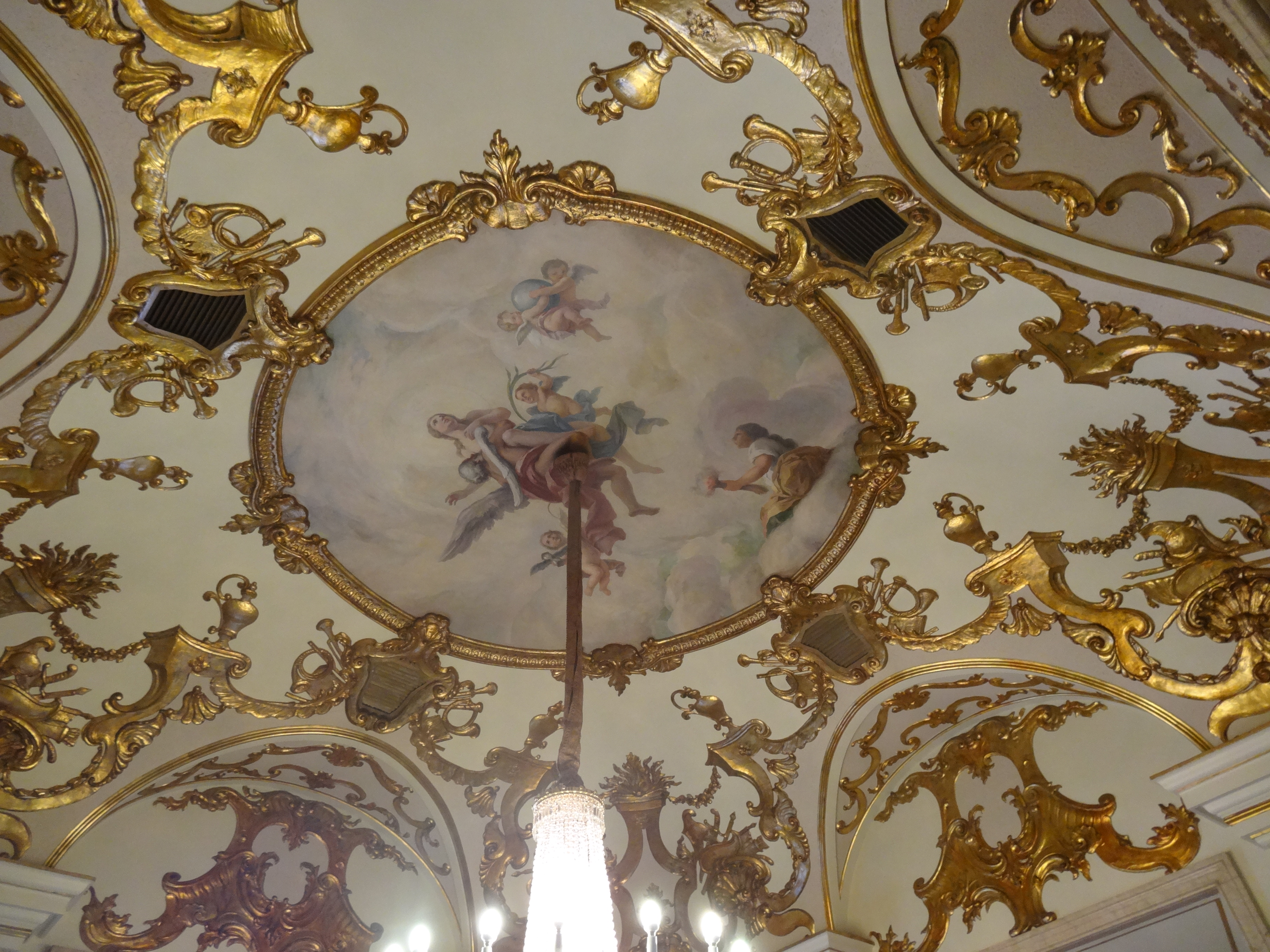
Ceiling of the Hall of Busts

==== New rooms ====
They are the two perpendicular wings built from 1965 to 1970 when the pavilion was enlarged, one of them contains the Gala Dining Room and the other one the "residential section".

- Gala Dining Room: it is the largest room in the palace despite its relatively low ceiling. It is decorated with Carlos IV style furniture.
- Rear Lobby: entirely covered in marble, it allows access to the garden and also serves as the nerve center of the residential or private section of the palace.
- Private Sitting Room: Located to the right of the lobby, it was formerly wood colored and is currently painted white. In the background, between the two doors that lead to the following rooms, hangs a portrait of Charles III.
- Lacquer Room: the small room gets its name from an oriental-style screen exhibited in the 1929 exposition; an elaborate Boulle-style chest of drawers is also remarkable.
- Private Dining Room: it is decorated with a neoclassical table from the old pavilion, as well as Louis XIV style consoles and paintings by Joaquim Vayreda and Ricard Canals.
- Library: its most outstanding piece of furniture is an oriental-style secretaire exhibited at the 1888 Barcelona Universal Exposition.
- Bedrooms: The residential section is completed by the private bedrooms located to the left of the lobby. These rooms are: the porcelain room, the hall, the main bedroom, the dressing room and the aide-de-camp bedroom.
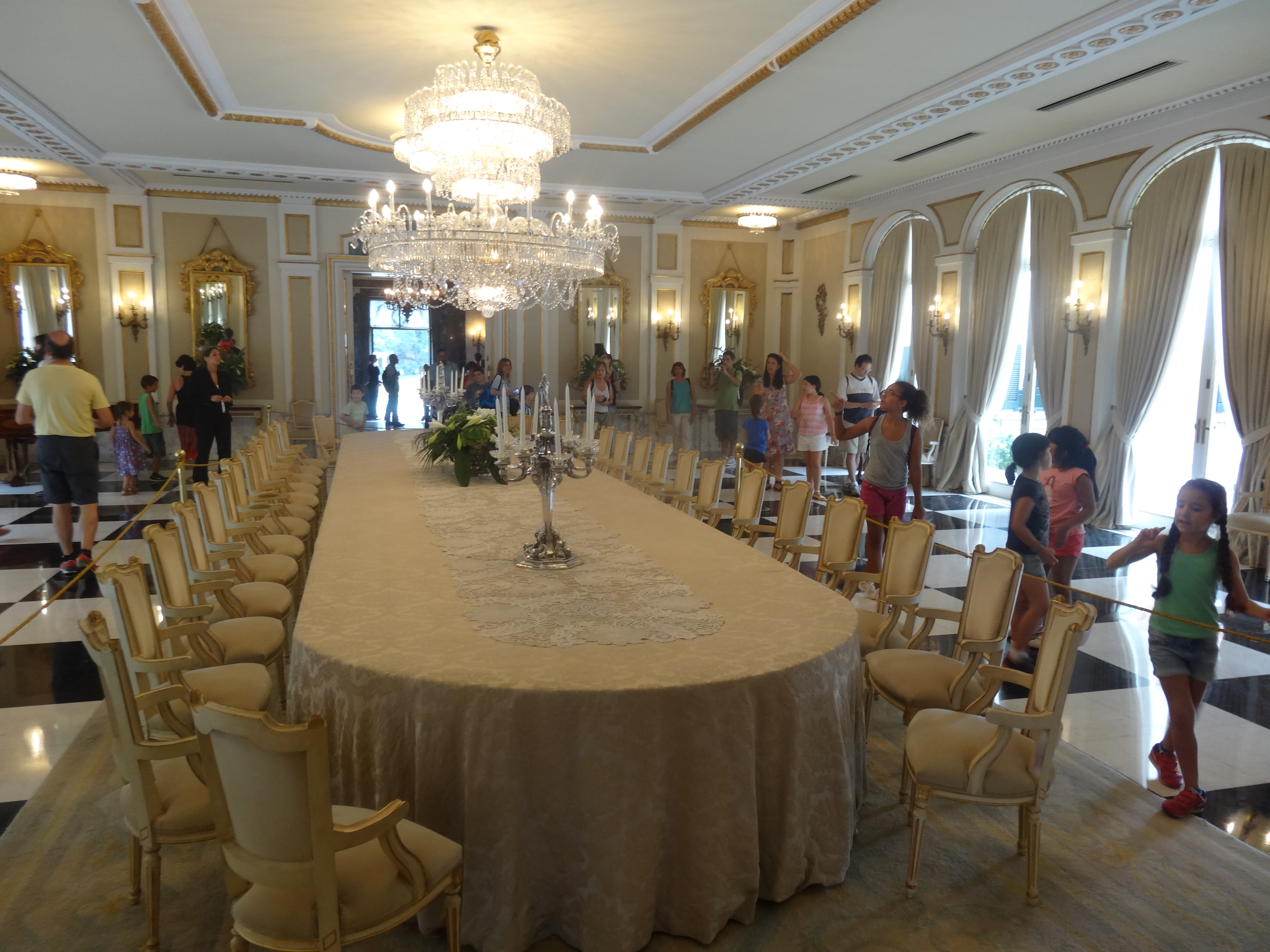
Gala Dining Room

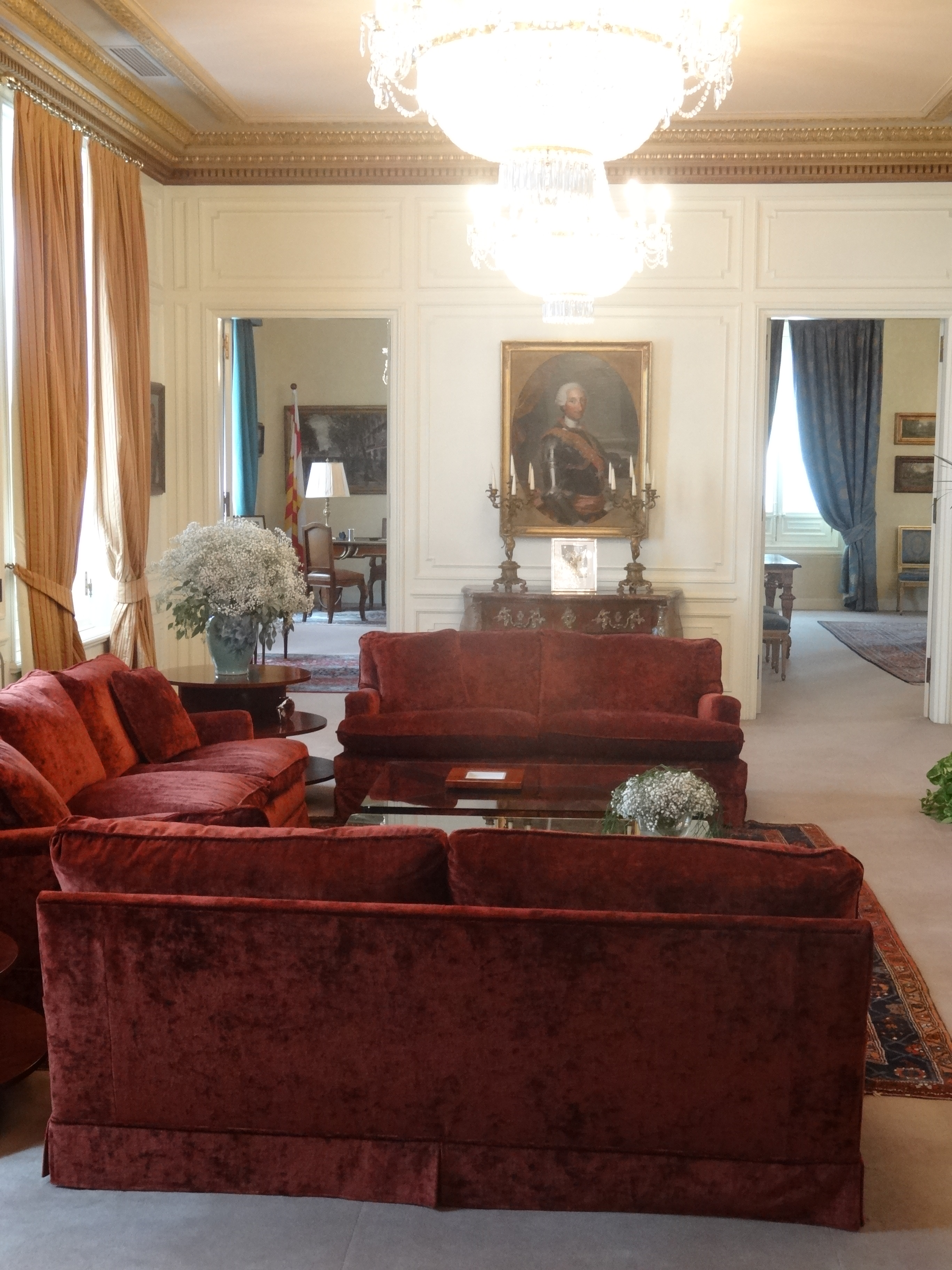
Private Sitting Room

== Joan Maragall gardens ==
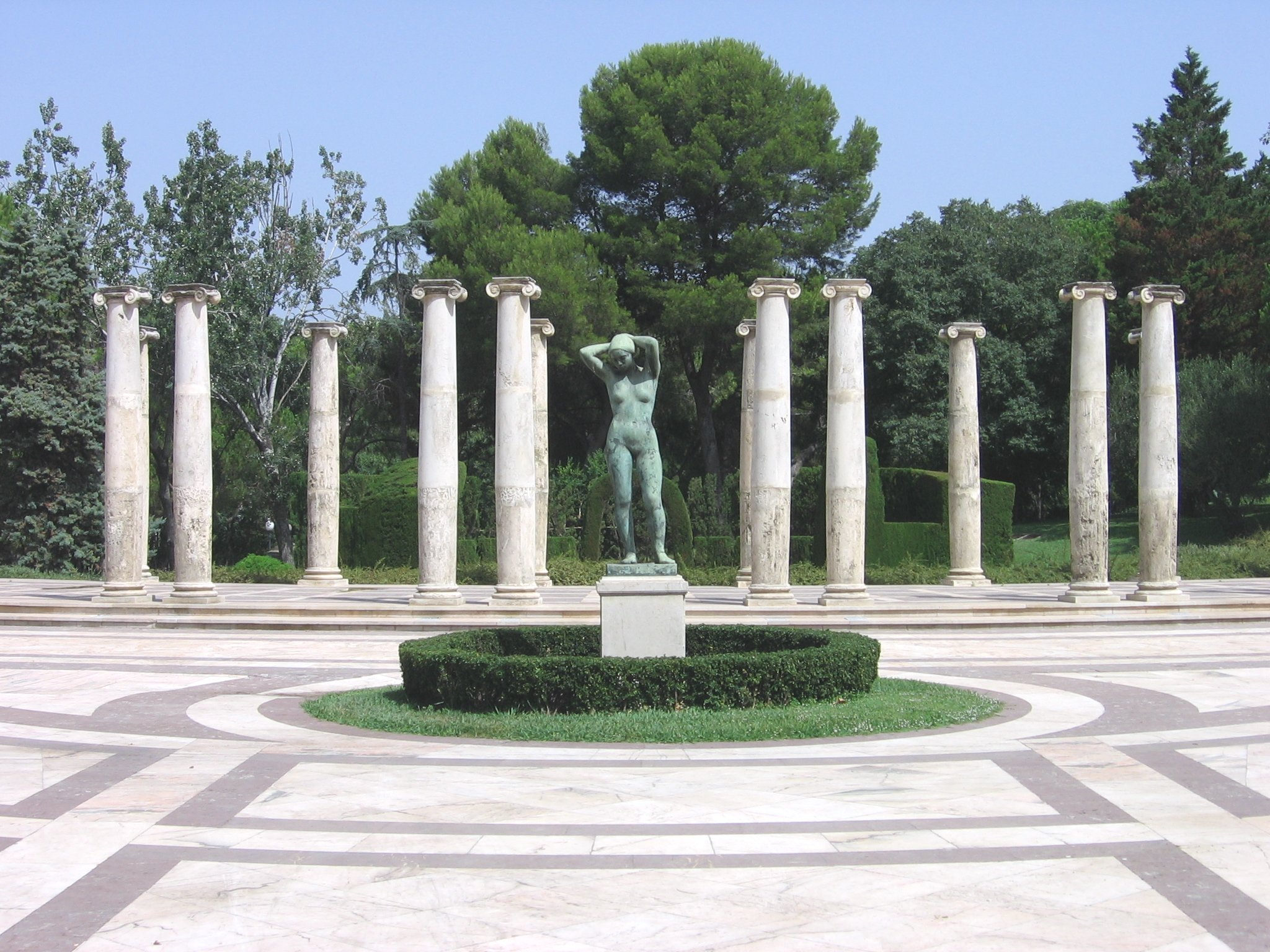
Serena, by Pilar Francesch.

The gardens of the palace are named after Spanish poet Joan Maragall, like other gardens in the Montjuïc area dedicated to poets, such as the gardens of Jacint Verdaguer, Miquel Costa i Llobera and Joan Brossa. The original gardens were designed by Jean-Claude Nicolas Forestier with the assistance of Spanish landscape architect Nicolás María Rubió Tudurí. They created a complex with a marked Mediterranean character, with a classicist taste, combining the gardens with the construction of pergolas and terraces.

Due to the desire to transform the palace into a true royal residence, since the Palau Reial de Pedralbes was not to the future King Juan Carlos I pleasure, in the 1970s the gardens were enlarged. The expansion project was carried out by Joaquim Maria Casamor, chief architect of the Department of Parks and Gardens of Barcelona, who designed a French-style project, with abundant sculptural decoration. The gardens are organized into three zones: one in front of the main facade of the palace, with two ponds at each end and a central area of flowerbeds, with a small temple with the sculpture Susanna in the Bath, by Théophile Barrau; another on the sides of the palace, which corresponds to the old gardens of 1929, where two fountains with tritons and two sculptures entitled Reclining Woman, by Enric Monjo, stand out; and the northern area, which overlooks the Palau Nacional (headquarters of the National Art Museum of Catalonia), where a peristyle courtyard with an Ionic colonnade stands out, with the sculpture Serena, by Pilar Francesch, and where the chapel of Santa Madrona is located.
