= Frio =

Frío or Frio may refer to:

== Places ==
- Frio River, Texas, United States
- Frio County, Texas, United States
- Frio Town, Texas, United States, known as Frio City

== Music ==
- Frio (musician), stage name of Edwin Rojas Restrepo, a Colombian singer-songwriter born in New York
- Frío (album), a 1994 Spanish-language album by Robi Draco Rosa
- "Frío (song)", a song by Ricky Martin from his 2011 album Música + Alma + Sexo
- "Frío", a song by Fey from her 2012 album Primera Fila

== Other uses ==
- Frio (Smart Card), a ticketing scheme operated by British Trentbarton buses

== See also ==
- Rio Frio (disambiguation)
