= Casa del Labrador =

Royal palace in Aranjuez, Spain

UNESCO World Heritage Site
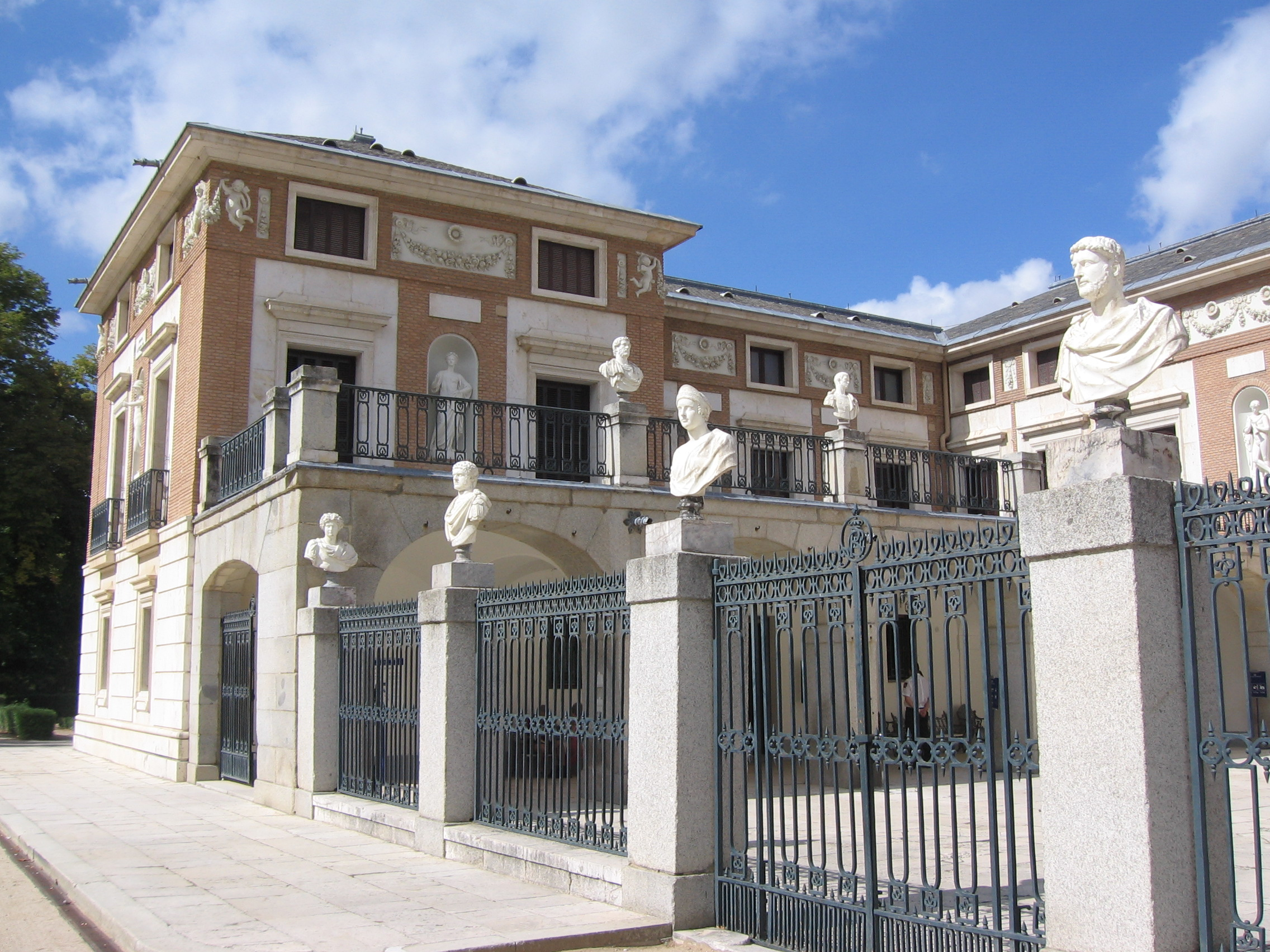
- Interactive map of Casa del Labrador
- Location: Community of Madrid, Spain
- Part of: Aranjuez Cultural Landscape
- Reference: 1044
- Inscription: 2001 (25th Session)
- Coordinates: 40°02′29″N 3°35′13″W

The Casa del Labrador is a neoclassical palace in Aranjuez, Spain. The name means "house of the farm labourer", and was borrowed from an earlier building on the site, although the new building was intended for royal use. It was designed to complement the Royal Palace, providing a place for the royal family to spend the day without some of the customary restrictions of court life.

== Architecture ==
The initial design was by the royal architect, Juan de Villanueva for King Charles IV.

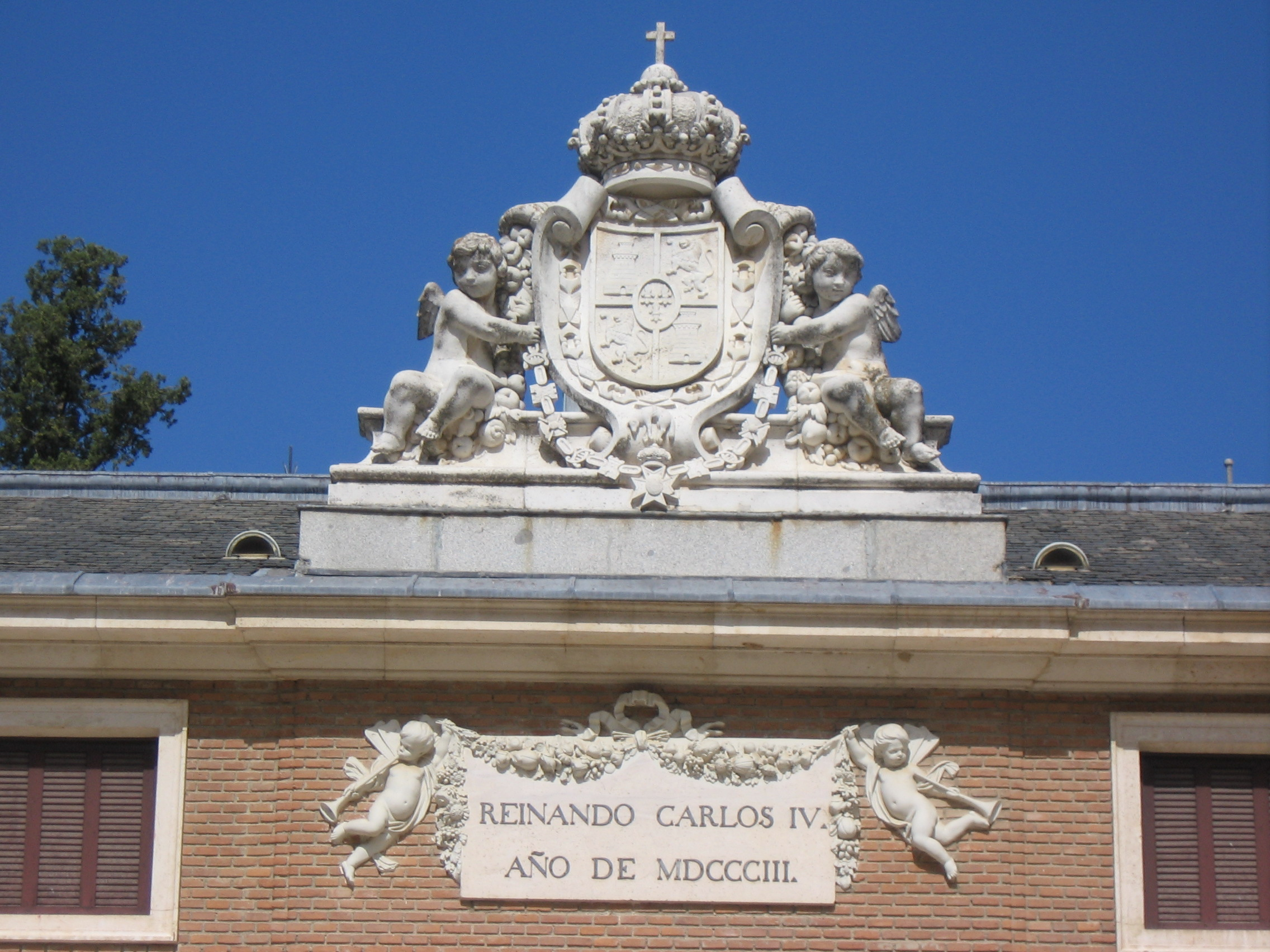
Detail of facade showing date in Roman numerals

A cartouche on the facade gives the date as 1803. The work was completed by Isidro González Velázquez.

== Decorations ==
The French designer Jean-Démosthène Dugourc, who entered Charles IV's service after the French Revolution broke out, made an important contribution to the interior decorations.

The marble floors incorporate some Roman mosaics found in Merida. There are murals by Zacarías González Velázquez.

== Access and conservation ==
The Casa del Labrador is set in a park called the Jardín del Príncipe bordering the River Tagus. Access to the gardens surrounding the Casa del Labrador is free, but there is a charge to visit the house itself which is in the care of the heritage agency Patrimonio Nacional. The Jardín del Príncipe is also the home of the Faluas Reales Museum, a modern building containing pleasure barges from the royal collection.

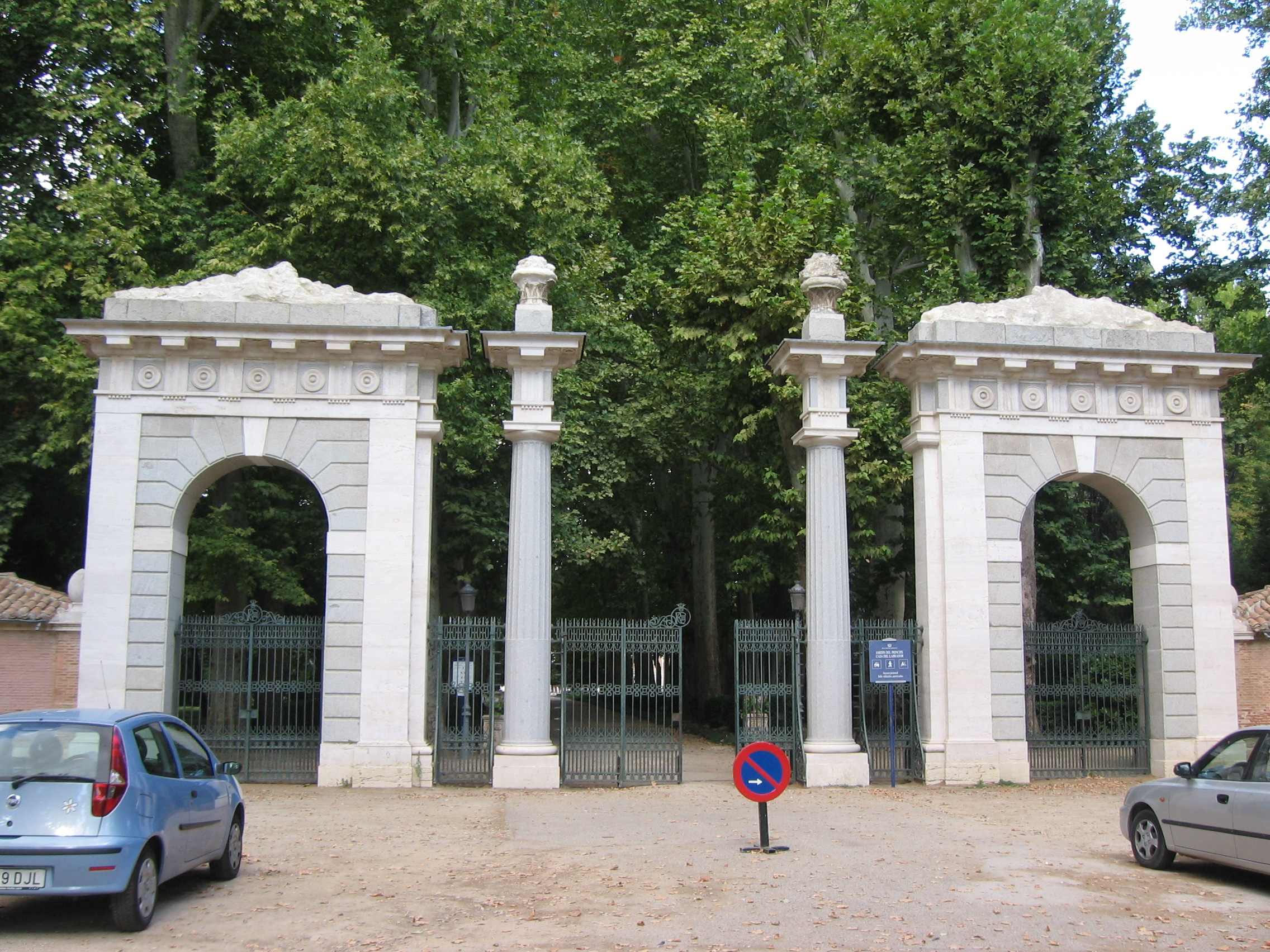
Entrance to park

In 1993 the building was listed on the Spanish heritage register as a Bien de Interés Cultural under the name "Casita del Labrador". Also the gardens in which it is set are protected as a Jardín Histórico. Since 2001 Aranjuez has been conserved as part of a World Heritage Site, the Aranjuez Cultural Landscape.

Between 2021 and 2024, the Casa del Labrador underwent a comprehensive renovation to address the "serious structural defects" it was suffering from, aggravated by Storm Filomena. The opportunity was also taken to fully restore both the interior and exterior, as well as the artistic pieces that decorate them, carrying out a complete renovation of the palace, valued at 10 million euros. King Felipe VI inaugurated the palace on 1 October 2025.

== Related properties ==
There are similar properties near other royal palaces in the Madrid area.

- Casita del Príncipe (El Escorial)

This building was also designed for Charles IV, but before he became king.
