= Oratory of the Caballero de Gracia =

Oratory of Caballero de Gracia
- Oratorio del Caballero de Gracia (Spanish)
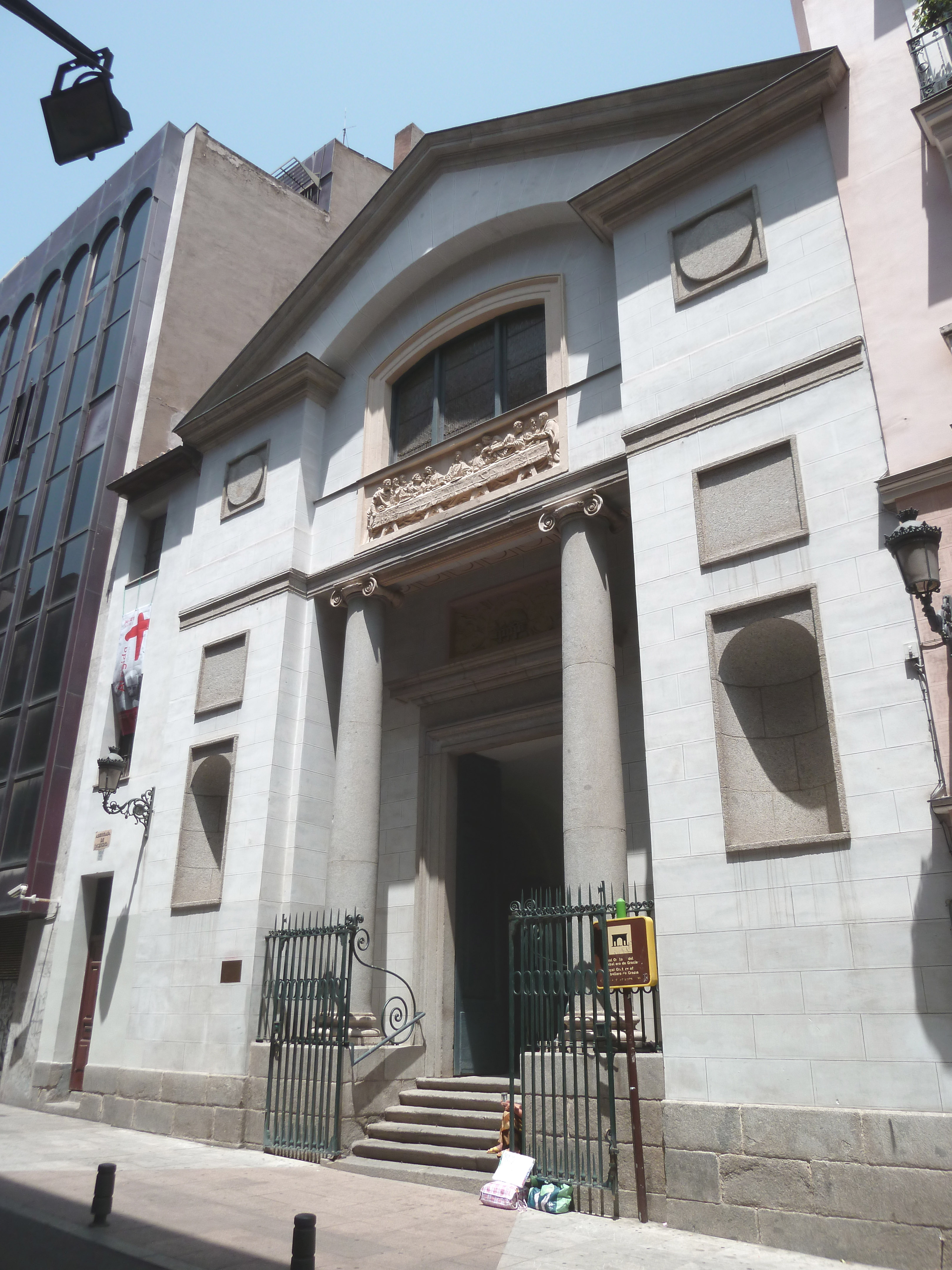

- Location within Spain
- 40.419568°N 3.700735°W
- Location: Madrid, Spain

Spanish Cultural Heritage
- Official name: Oratorio del Caballero de Gracia
- Type: Non-movable
- Criteria: Monument
- Designated: 1956
- Reference no.: RI-51-0001254

The Oratory of Caballero de Gracia (Spanish: Oratorio del Caballero de Gracia) is a neoclassical church (oratory) located in Madrid, Spain. It is named after Jacobo de Grattis who was known as the Caballero de Gracia.

Juan de Villanueva drew up plans for the reconstruction of an existing church.

The interior has a stained glass window by the firm Maumejean.

== Conservation ==
The northern side of the building was reconstructed in the 20th century when the Gran Via was laid out. The architect was Carlos de Luque López. The facade on the Gran Via was later altered by Javier Feduchi Benlliure.

The building has been given the heritage listing Bien de Interés Cultural and has been protected since 1956.

== See also ==
- Catholic Church in Spain
- List of oldest church buildings
