= Rio Frio =

Rio Frio or Río Frío or Frio River (English: Cold River) may refer to:

== Rivers ==
- Frío River (Costa Rica)
- Frío River (Puerto Rico)
- Frio River, Texas
- Río Frío (Bogotá), a tributary of the Bogotá River, Colombia
- Río Frío, a tributary of the Palena River, Chile

== Settlements ==
- Rio Frio (Bragança), a parish in the municipality of Bragança, Portugal
- Rio Frio, Alberta, Canada
- Rio Frio, Texas, an unincorporated community in Real County, Texas, USA
- Río Frío de Juárez, a village in Mexico

== Other uses ==
- Río Frío Airport, Río Frío, Chile
- Río Frío (Mexico City Metrobús), a BRT station in Mexico City

== See also ==
- Frio (disambiguation)
- Riofrío (disambiguation)
