= Riofrío del Llano =

Riofrío del Llano, Spain
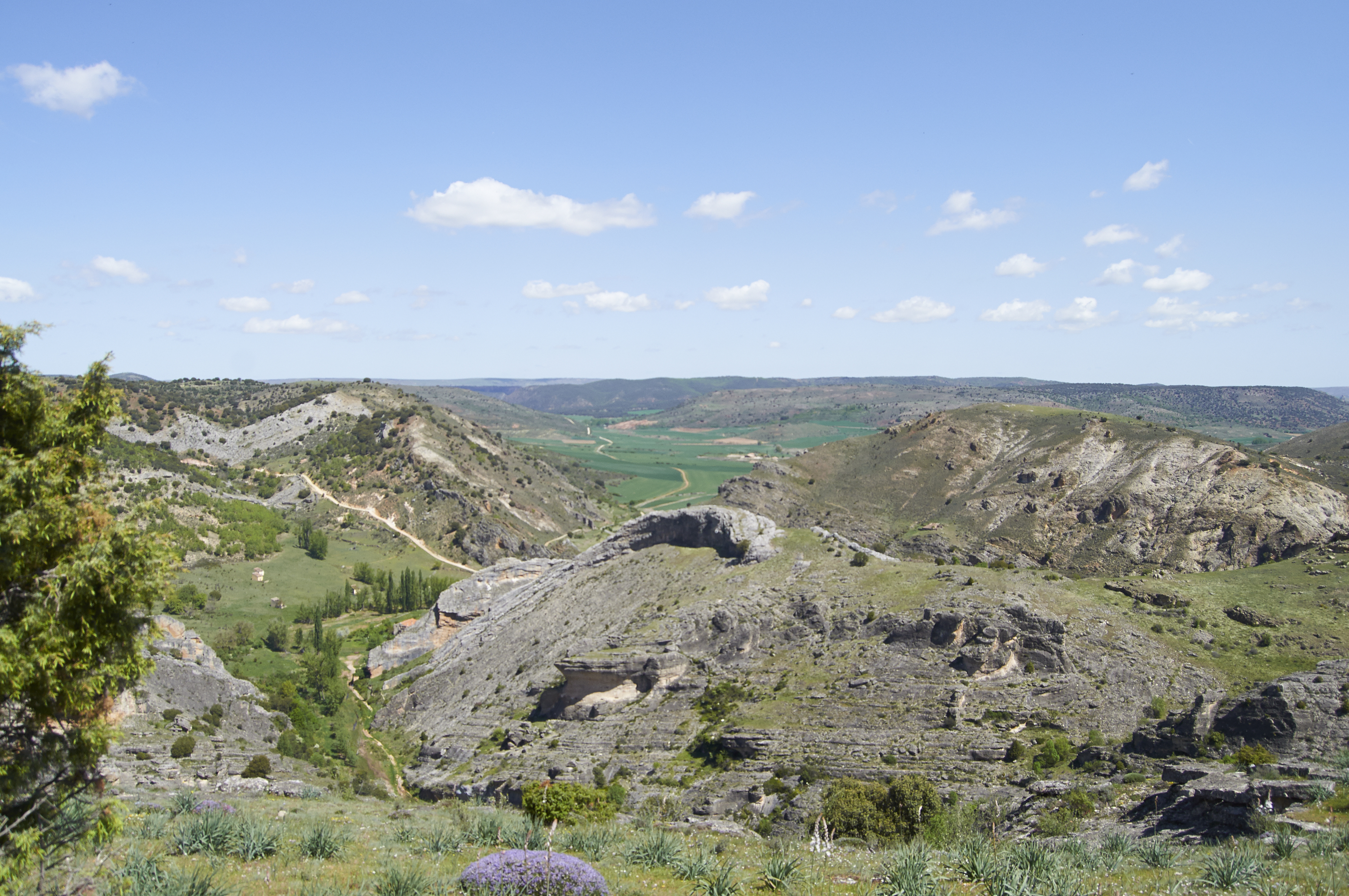

- Location within Province of Guadalajara Location within Castilla-La Mancha Location within Spain
- Coordinates: 41°08′16″N 2°49′29″W
- Country: Spain
- Autonomous community: Castile-La Mancha
- Province: Guadalajara
- Municipality: Riofrío del Llano

Area
  - Total: 43 km^{2} (17 sq mi)
- Elevation: 1,018 m (3,340 ft)

Population (2025-01-01)
  - Total: 49
  - Density: 1.1/km^{2} (3.0/sq mi)
- Time zone: UTC+1 (CET)
  - Summer (DST): UTC+2 (CEST)

Riofrío del Llano is a municipality located in the province of Guadalajara, Castile-La Mancha, Spain. According to the 2004 census (INE), the municipality has a population of 57 inhabitants.
