= Navas de Riofrío =

- Municipality
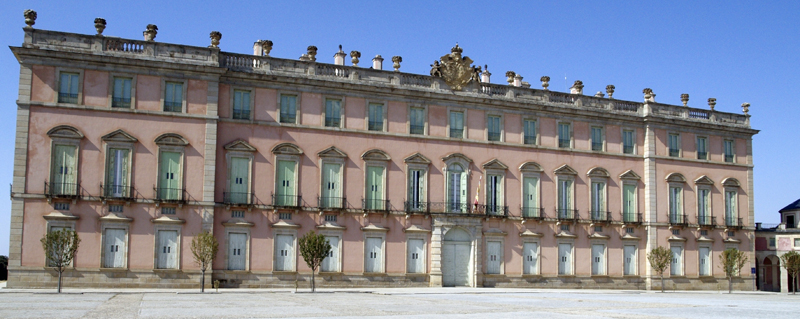
- Royal Palace of Riofrío

- Coat of arms

- Location in Spain. Navas de Riofrío (Spain)
- Coordinates: 40°51′51″N 4°08′16″W
- Country: Spain
- Autonomous community: Castile and León
- Province: Segovia
- Municipality: Navas de Riofrío

Area
  - Total: 14 km^{2} (5.4 sq mi)

Population (2025-01-01)
  - Total: 430
  - Density: 31/km^{2} (80/sq mi)
- Time zone: UTC+1 (CET)
  - Summer (DST): UTC+2 (CEST)
- Website: Official website

Navas de Riofrío is a municipality located in the province of Segovia, Castile and León, Spain. According to the 2004 census (INE), the municipality has a population of 343 inhabitants.

Historical population
Year	1991	1996	2001	2004
Pop.	218	262	280	343
±%	—	+20.2%	+6.9%	+22.5%

== See also ==
- Royal Palace of Riofrío
