= Frio (musician) =

FRIO
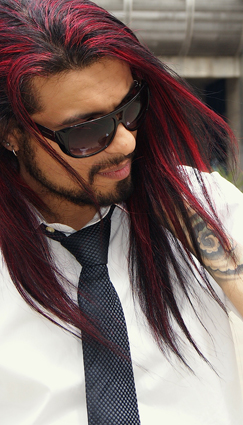

Background information
- Birth name: Edwin Rojas Restrepo
- Born: June 10, 1980 (age 44); New York City, United States
- Origin: Colombia
- Occupation: Singer-songwriter
- Instruments: Vocal; piano; guitar
- Years active: 1989–present
- Labels: Penthouse Clear

Edwin Rojas Restrepo (born 1980), better known by his stage name FRIO (Spanish for "cold"), is a Colombian singer-songwriter born in New York, United States. FRIO is known for merging musical genres from different world cultures such as Flamenco, R&B, ballad, vallenato and electronica, among others.

He became known in Colombia with his first single "No Me Da La Gana", a fusion of genres such as ballads, pop, electronica and rock. At age 9 he began professional study with Carlos Mario Vasquez, director of the Escuela Viva La Musica. In 1989, started studying piano, guitar and vocal technique. He then played in the rock band Medellin. His first solo album was No Me Da La Gana, pre-produced in the studios "Frio Music (Colombia), with full production in KDS Studios (Orlando, Florida). The 14 songs fused pop and rock with Anglo and Latino genres. No Me Da La Gana is an album, which speaks of rebellion, hate, death, disappointment, an autobiographical album.

== Discography ==
- No Me Da La Gana (2011)
