= Casita del Príncipe (El Escorial) =

Cultural property in El Escorial, Spain

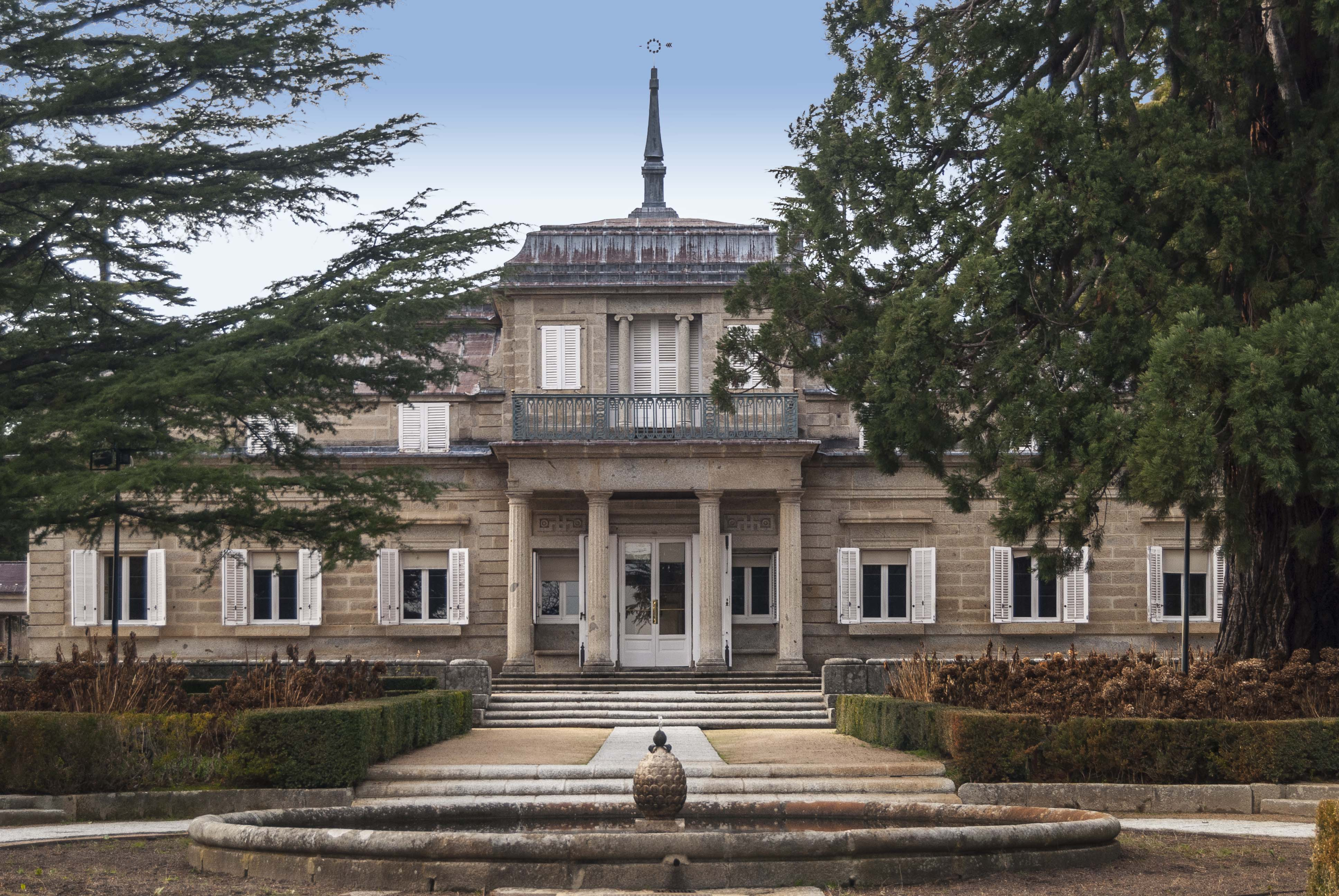
- The Casita is set in a garden with conifers much taller than the building

General information
- Architectural style: Neoclassical
- Location: San Lorenzo de El Escorial, Spain

Design and construction
- Architect(s): Juan de Villanueva

UNESCO World Heritage Site
- Official name: Casita del Príncipe
- Criteria: Cultural: (i)(ii)(vi)
- Designated: 1984 (8th session)
- Part of: Monastery and Site of the Escurial, Madrid
- Reference no.: 318
- Location: Community of Madrid, Spain

Spanish Cultural Heritage
- Official name: Casita del Príncipe
- Type: Non-movable
- Criteria: Monument
- Designated: 1992
- Reference no.: RI-51-0007308

The Casita del Príncipe (Spanish for 'Cottage of the Prince') is an eighteenth-century building located in San Lorenzo de El Escorial, Spain. It was designed by the neoclassical architect Juan de Villanueva for the private use of the heir to the Spanish throne Charles, Prince of Asturias, and his wife Maria Luisa. It was constructed in the 1770s and extended in the 1780s.

The word casita is the diminutive of the Spanish word for "house". The building was designed without bedrooms, as its owners slept in the palace which had been built two centuries earlier for Philip II. Such buildings gave their royal occupants the opportunity to escape some of the formalities of court life. The Petit Trianon at Versailles offers a French example of the phenomenon.

== Setting ==
The building is set in a formal garden. The garden is in turn set in a walled park.

The garden, which is on several levels, is delineated by box hedges in 18th century style. It also features some exotic conifers, such as Sequoiadendron giganteum, a species introduced to Europe in the 19th century, and Abies nordmanniana (see note^{1}).

== Interior ==
The interior is decorated in neoclassical style with some Pompeian influence.

There is a Sala de Porcelana on the upper floor. This room features jasperware plaques in neoclassical style. Reminiscent of the work of the English Wedgwood company, the plaques were made in Madrid in the 1790s by the Real Fábrica del Buen Retiro.

== Conservation and access ==
The building is protected as part of a World Heritage Site. Under Spanish law it was declared Bien de Interés Cultural in 1992.

Guided tours of the ground floor are offered by the Spanish heritage organisation Patrimonio Nacional, and tickets can be obtained at the property.

== See also ==
- Imperial Route of the Community of Madrid

=== Related buildings ===
- Casita del Príncipe (El Pardo): Villanueva designed another building called Casita del Príncipe, for the same royal client. This later building is also in the proximity of a royal palace, that of El Pardo.
- Casita del Infante: Villaneuva designed another house in El Escorial, the Casita del Infante, for the Prince's younger brother Gabriel. The two "casitas" form a pair, with the Casita del Infante having the alternative name of the Casita de Arriba (the upper casita) indicating its position relative to the Casita del Príncipe.

== Notes ==
1. The conifers are associated with the national forestry school which was moved to El Escorial in the late 19th century (Real Orden de Regencia. 25.10.1869).
