= Patrimonio Nacional =

Spanish state agency

National Heritage
- Patrimonio Nacional
- The Spanish Royal Crown, symbol of Patrimonio Nacional

Agency overview
- Formed: May 12, 1865; 161 years ago (as Crown Heritage); March 7, 1940; 86 years ago (as National Heritage)
- Preceding agencies: Crown Heritage (1865–1931); Republic Heritage (1931–1940)
- Type: Autonomous agency
- Jurisdiction: Spanish government
- Headquarters: Royal Palace of Madrid
- Employees: 1,205 (2025)
- Annual budget: €149 million, 2023
- Agency executives: Ana de la Cueva, Chairman; Ana María Robles González, Manager
- Parent department: Ministry of the Presidency, Justice and Relations with the Cortes
- Website: Web Site

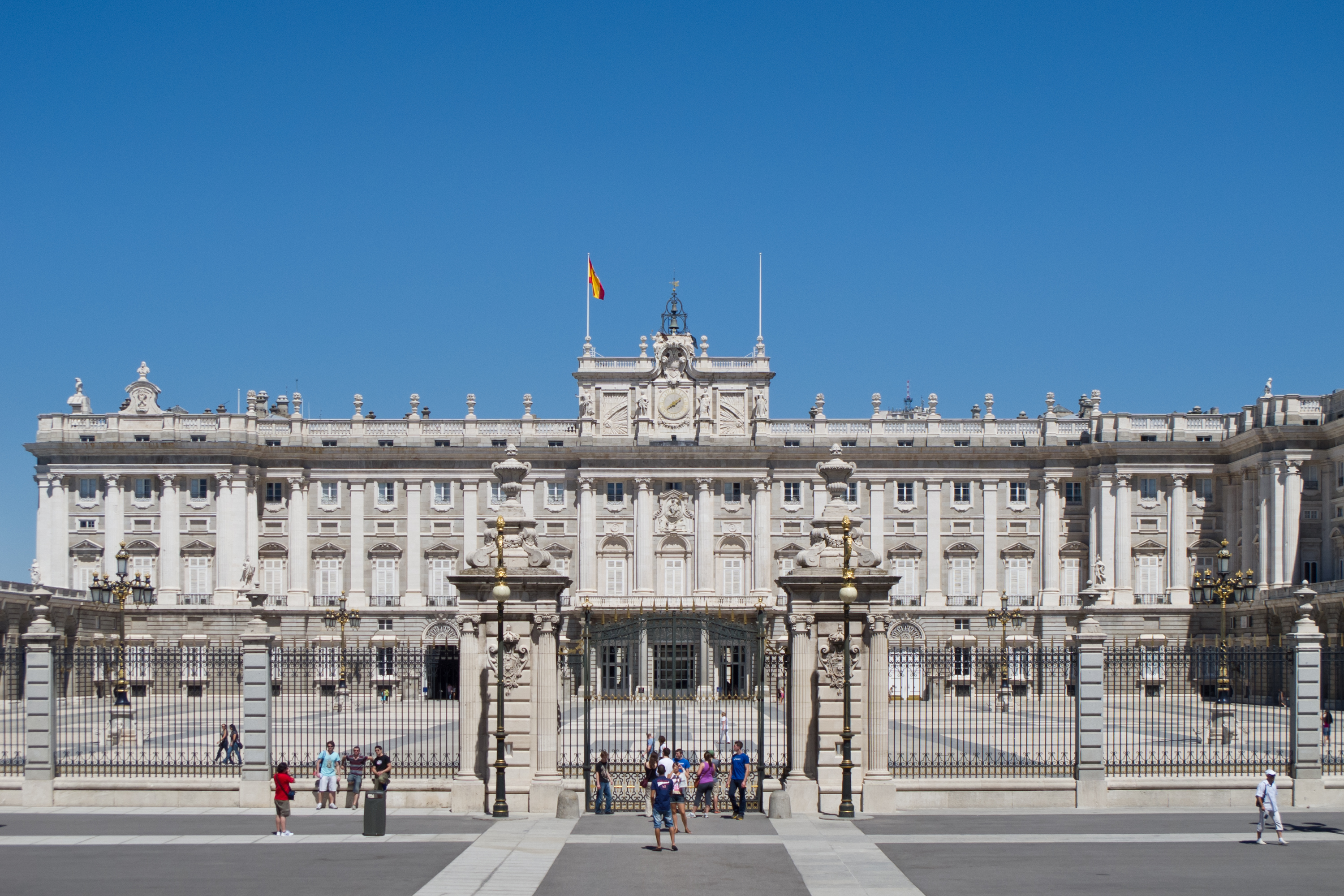
Palacio Real de Madrid.

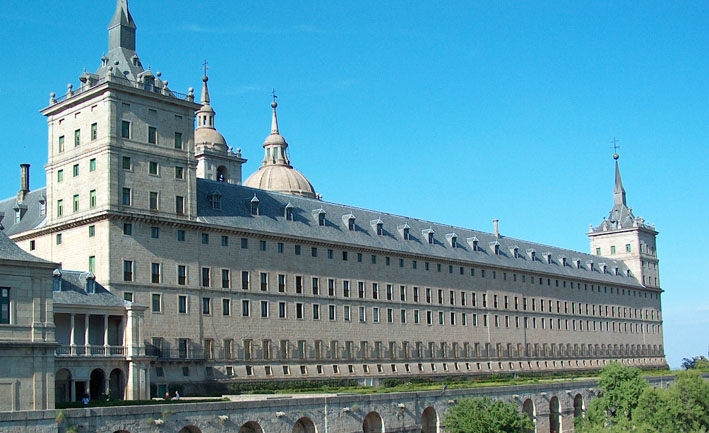
Monasterio de El Escorial.

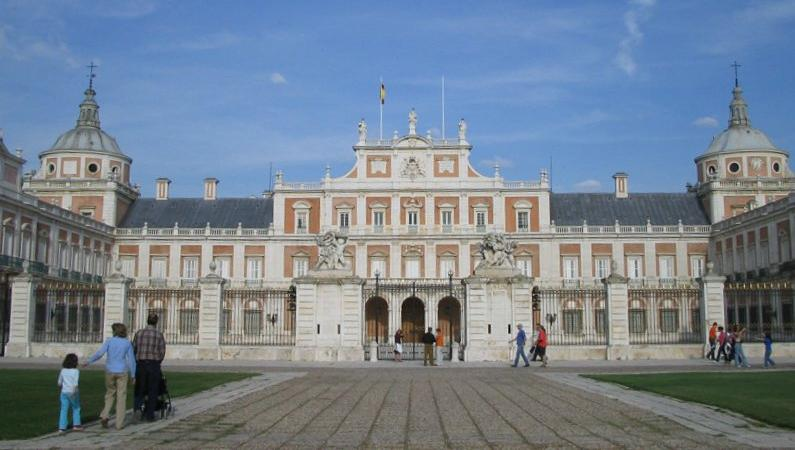
Palacio Real de Aranjuez.

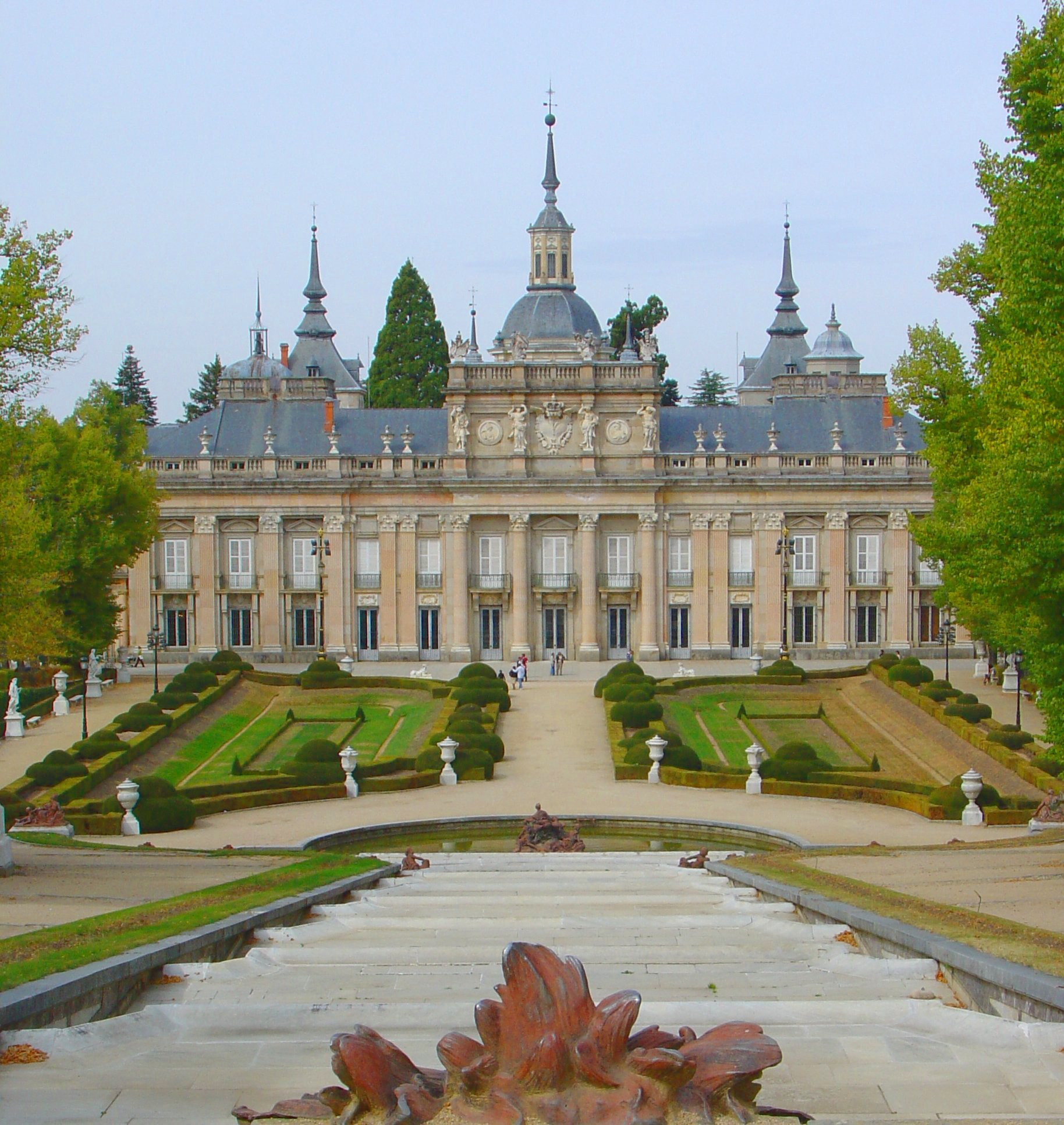
Palacio Real de La Granja de San Ildefonso.

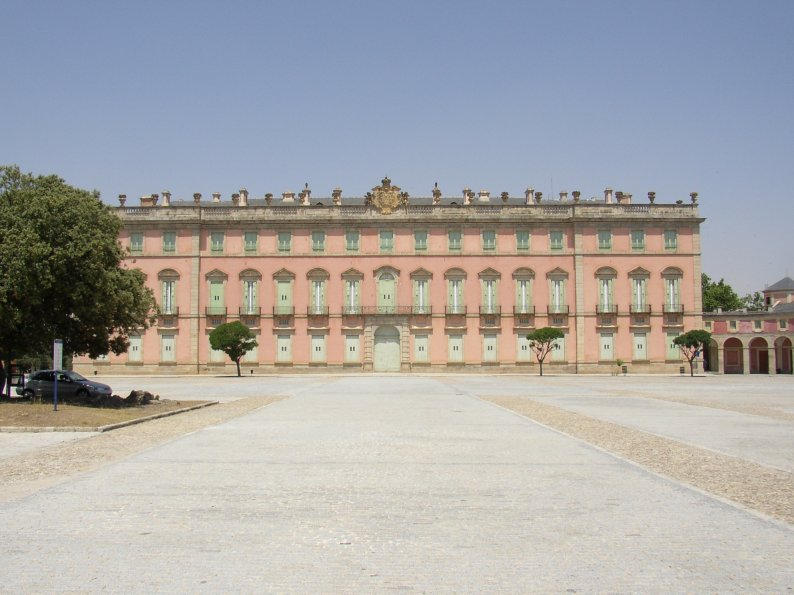
Palacio Real de Riofrío.

Patrimonio Nacional (English: National Heritage) is a Spanish autonomous agency, under the jurisdiction of the Ministry of the Presidency, Justice and Relations with the Cortes, that administers the sites owned by the Spanish State and used by the Monarch and the royal family as residences and for State ceremonies. The Patrimonio Nacional includes palaces, gardens, monasteries and convents, called the Royal sites. When not in official use, the Royal sites are open to the public. It also manages the official and holiday residences of the Prime Minister.

The agency was first created in 1865 during the reign of Isabella II under the name of Patrimonio de la Corona (English: Heritage of the Crown). During the reign of her grandson, Alfonso XIII, it was also known as Patrimonio Real (English: Royal Heritage). The second republic (1931–1939) kept the agency under the name of Patrimonio de la República (English: Heritage of the Republic), and it has been called by its current name since in 1940, when it was renamed Patrimonio National by the dictator Francisco Franco.

Patrimonio Nacional organizes temporary exhibitions and concerts in the Royal sites. It also publishes catalogues of the Royal Collections, books on the Royal sites, facsimiles of some of the books held in the library of El Escorial and the Royal Library, visitors guides to the different sites as well as the official photographs of the King of Spain. It also publishes a quarterly magazine, Reales Sitios, about the art collections and cultural history of the Royal sites.

The Royal Family has other palaces that are not controlled by Patrimonio Nacional.

== Royal Places ==
=== Royal Palaces ===
- Royal Palace of Madrid (Madrid).
- Casita del Príncipe or Casita de Abajo (El Escorial)
- Casita del Príncipe (El Pardo)
- Casita del Infante (San Lorenzo de El Escorial).
- Royal Palace of Zarzuela (Madrid)
- Royal Site of San Lorenzo de El Escorial (San Lorenzo de El Escorial).
- Royal Palace of Aranjuez and his royal gardens and buildings (Aranjuez).
- Casa del Labrador (Aranjuez).
- Royal Palace of El Pardo (Madrid).
- Royal Palace of La Granja de San Ildefonso and all the royal buildings attached. (Real Sitio de San Ildefonso).
- Royal Palace of Riofrío (Real Sitio de San Ildefonso).
- Royal Palace of La Almudaina (Palma).
- Residencia Real de La Mareta (Teguise).

=== Royal convents and monasteries ===
- Royal Convent of Las Descalzas Reales (Madrid).
- Monastery of Yuste (Cuacos de Yuste).
- Royal Monastery of the Incarnation (Madrid).
- Royal Monastery of Santa Isabel (Madrid).
- Royal Convent of Santa Clara (Tordesillas).
- Abbey of Santa Maria la Real de Huelgas (Burgos).
- Royal Convent of San Pascual (Aranjuez).
- Colegio de Doncellas Nobles (Toledo).
- Benedictine Abbey of Santa Cruz del Valle de los Caídos (San Lorenzo de El Escorial).
- Pantheon of Illustrious Men (Madrid)

== Residences of the Prime Minister ==
- Palace of Moncloa (Madrid)
- Palace of Las Marismillas (Almonte)
- Coto Nacional de los Quintos de Mora (Los Yébenes)

== Royal Collections Gallery ==
In addition to the exhibitions that Patrimonio Nacional carries out in the different Royal Sites, the agency administers a museum opened in 2023, the Royal Collections Gallery, destined to exhibit the heritage accumulated by the Spanish Monarchy for centuries.

== The Board ==
The National Heritage is managed by the Board of Directors of the agency which, according to Act 23/1982, is composed by a Chairperson and a Manager appointed by the Monarch, with the advice of the Prime Minister; and thirteen members of renowned reputation, including two city councilors of towns where properties of Patrimonio Nacional are located (currently the cities of Madrid and Palma) and two members from museums and cultural institutions of recognized prestige and international projection.

=== Structure ===
The agency is structured through a central and a decentralized one:

The central structure is integrated by:

- The Administration and Resources Directorate.
- The Royal Collections Directorate.
- The Real Estate and Natural Environment Directorate.
- The Official and Cultural Events Directorate.

The territorial or decentralized structure is integrated by the Board' delegations in palaces, monasteries and other properties and organizations.

== See also ==
- Crown Estate
