= Juan de Villanueva =

Spanish architect

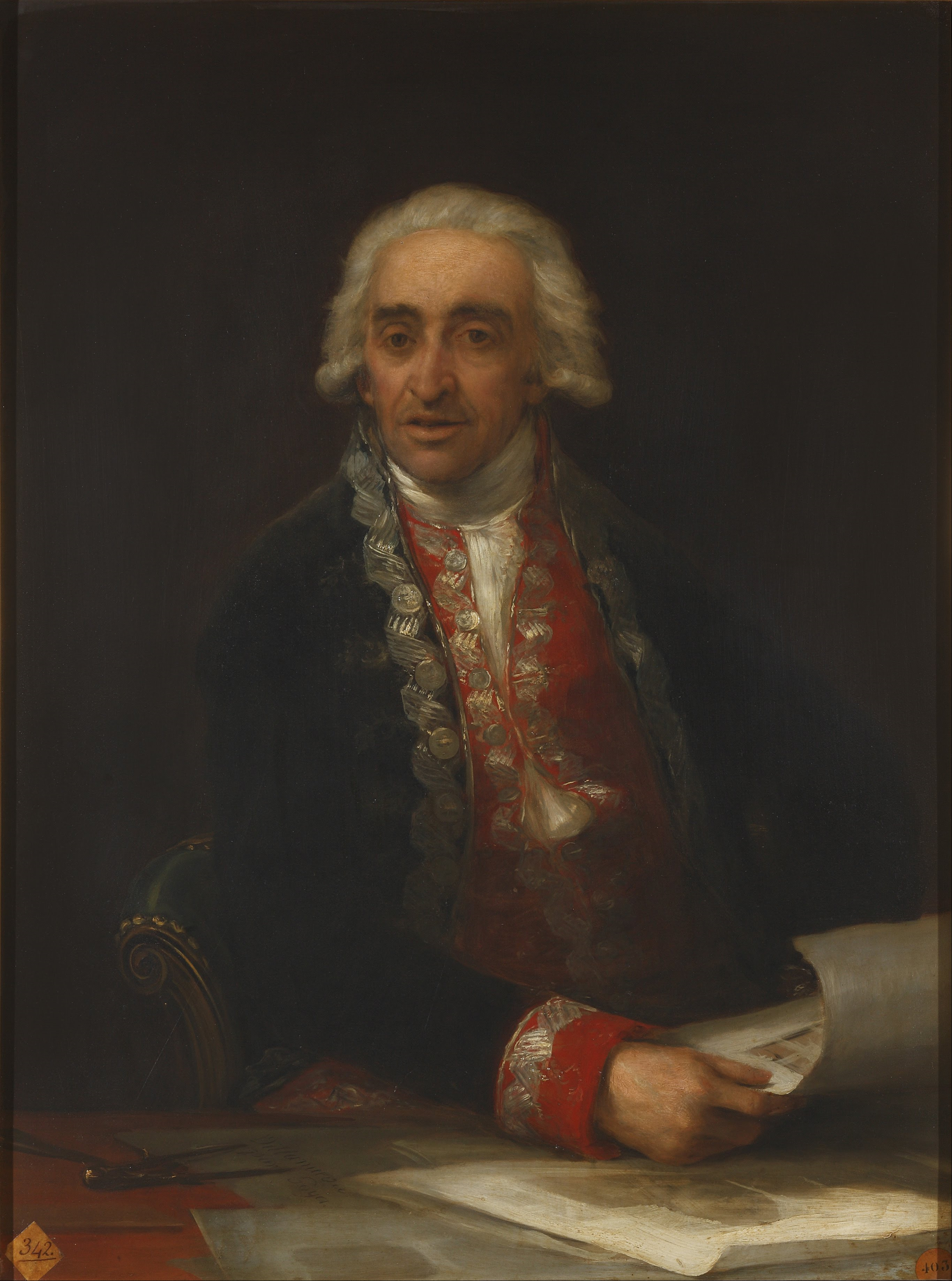
Portrait of Juan de Villanueva, by Francisco Goya. c. 1805 (Real Academia de Bellas Artes de San Fernando)

Juan de Villanueva (September 15, 1739 in Madrid – August 22, 1811) was a Spanish architect. Alongside Ventura Rodríguez, Villanueva is the best known architect of Spanish Neoclassicism.

== Biography ==
His father was the sculptor Juan de Villanueva and his brother, Diego de Villanueva was not only his protector, but also his teacher.

He entered the Royal Academy of Fine Arts of San Fernando as a pupil when he was eleven years old. In 1758, he travelled to Rome to become a grant holder of the Academy to complete his studies. In 1765, he returned to Spain.

A year later, he travelled through Córdoba and Granada, where he, together with José de Hermosilla, went to draw the "Arab antiquities." The drawings from these travels were published in 1804. He settled in Madrid, where he was appointed Academic of the Academy of San Fernando.

In 1777, Charles III appointed him Architect of the Prince and the Infants. From then to the end of his life he would work almost exclusively for the Royal House. In 1781, he was appointed Architect of the Royal Monastery of El Escorial, and Charles IV appointed him Major Architect. He was going to construct several pavilions for the royal disposal: in 1771, he built the Casa de Infantes at the Royal Palace of Aranjuez; in 1772, the Casita del Príncipe, at El Pardo; in 1773, the Casita del Infante (with a Palladian scheme and a notable plasticity in the treatment for the main portal) and the Casita del Príncipe, both in El Escorial, where he also constructed the Casas de Oficios, a group of houses, according to the sober Herrerian style of the Monastery.

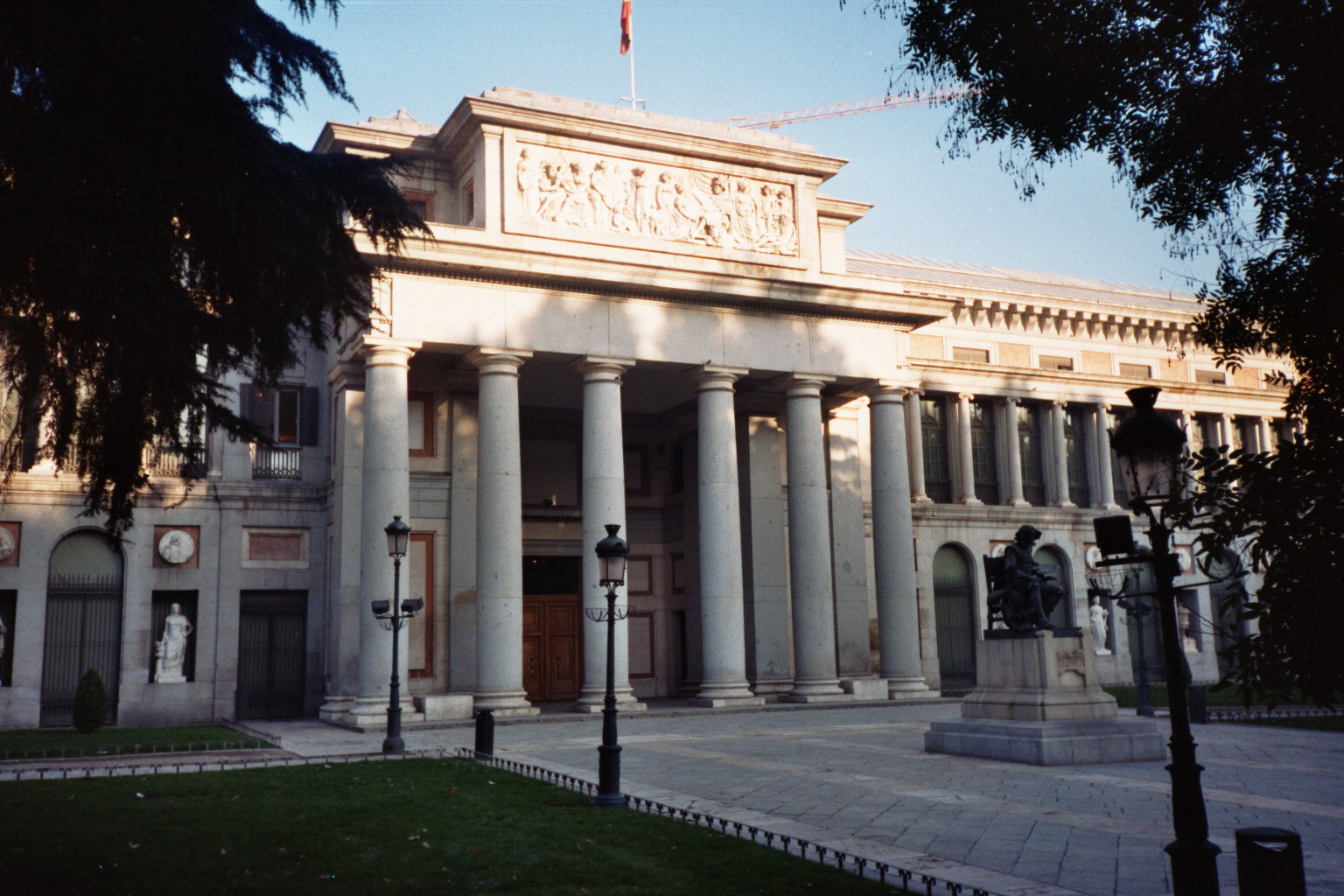
Prado Museum, Velázquez entrance.

Nevertheless, his undisputed masterpiece is the Prado Museum, projected in 1785 and 1787. It was constructed as a Museum of Natural History, a School of Natural History, and an auditorium for conferences and lectures. It was transformed into the Museum of Art in 1814, and today it is also known as Edificio Villanueva.

He was a prolific architect and he displayed the majority of his work in Madrid: buildings like the Academy of History, the Oratory of the Caballero de Gracia, the Royal Observatory of Madrid are remarkable. With his interventions in the Plaza Mayor, both after the fire of 1790 and in the Major House among others, he collaborated in the renovation of the image of the city. He was buried in St Sebastian's Church, Madrid.

With his personal style and with his strong local influences, he was the architect who best brought the theorical basis of European Neoclassicism to Spain.

== Main works ==
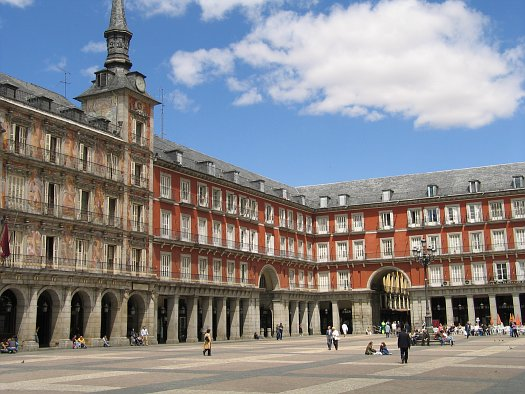
Plaza Mayor, Madrid, reformed by Villanueva.

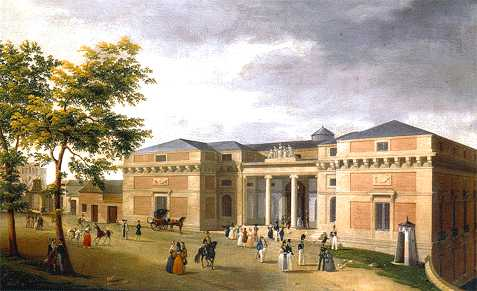
Prado Museum. Goya façade according to Villanueva's project.

- Casita de los Infantes, Aranjuez (1771)
- Casita del Infante, El Escorial (1773)
- Casita del Principe, El Escorial (1773)
- Royal Botanical Garden, Madrid (1774-1781)
- Casita del Príncipe, El Pardo (1784)
- Casa de los Oficios, El Escorial (1785)
- Prado Museum, Madrid (1785)
- Academy of History, Madrid (1788)
- Oratory of Caballero de Gracia, Madrid (1789)
- Major House of Madrid: Columned façade to the Calle Mayor, Madrid (1789)
- Royal Observatory of Madrid (1790)
- Reconstruction of the Plaza Mayor, Madrid (1791)
- Teatro Español (Madrid)(1804)
- General Cemetery of the North, Madrid (1804)
