= Casita del Príncipe (El Pardo) =

Coordinates: 40°31′24″N 3°46′43″W

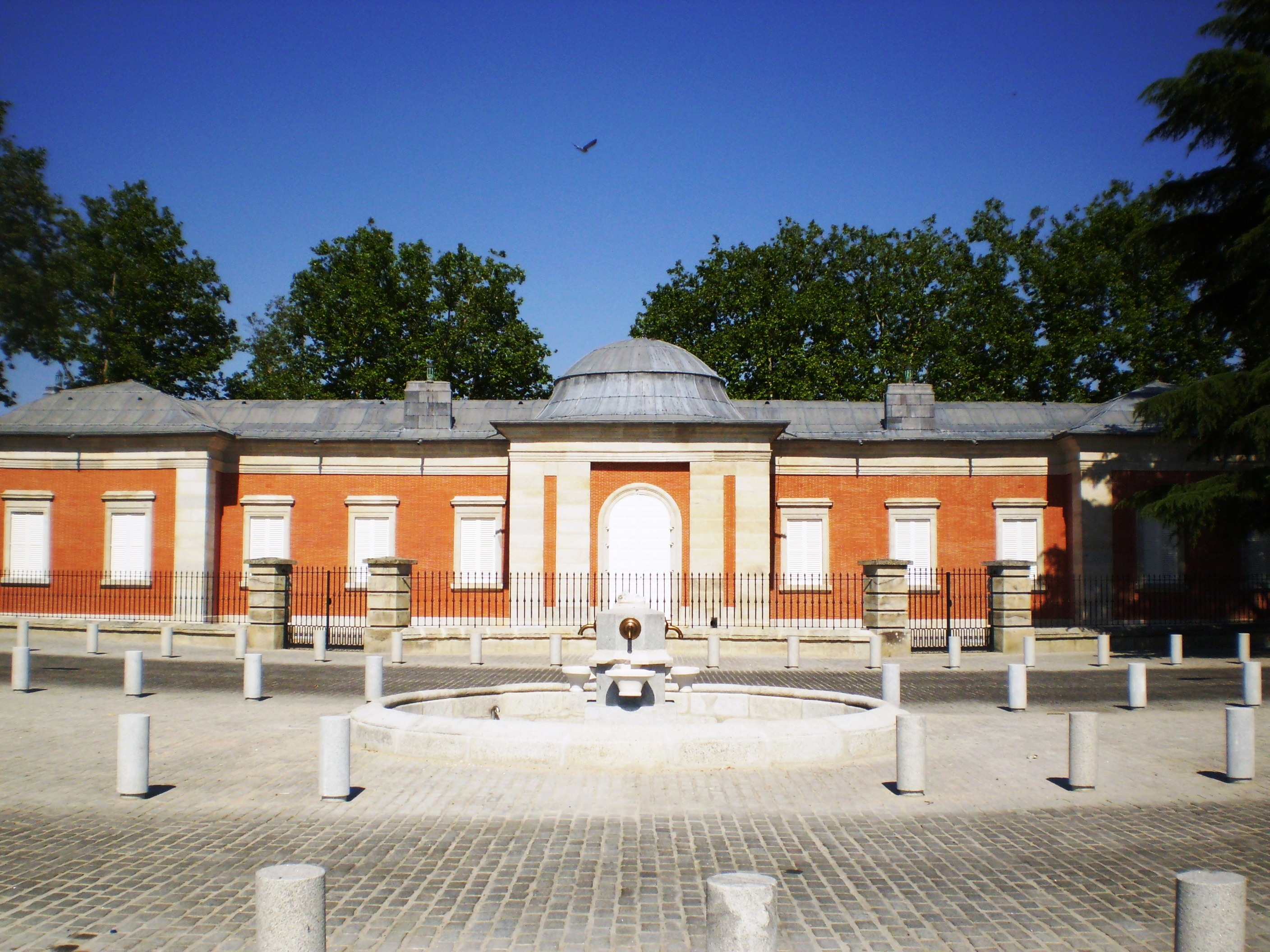

General information
- Architectural style: Neoclassical
- Location: Spain

Design and construction
- Architect(s): Juan de Villanueva

The Casita del Príncipe (Spanish for 'Cottage of the Prince') is an eighteenth-century house near the Royal Palace of El Pardo which is set in a hunting estate north of Madrid.

== History ==
The neoclassical architect Juan de Villanueva designed the building for Charles, Prince of Asturias, the heir to the Spanish throne. Construction began in 1784.

Villanueva had previously designed another building known as the Casita del Príncipe for the same client at El Escorial. The word casita is the diminutive of the Spanish word for "house". Such buildings gave their royal occupants the opportunity to escape some of the formalities of court life. The Petit Trianon at Versailles offers a French example of the phenomenon.

The building is administered by the Patrimonio Nacional. Following restoration work in the early twenty-first century, the building is open to the public by prior arrangement. The artwork inside includes a fresco by Francisco Bayeu y Subías.
