= Palace of Zarzuela =

Private residence of the Spanish royal family in Madrid, Spain

Zarzuela Palace
- Palacio de la Zarzuela
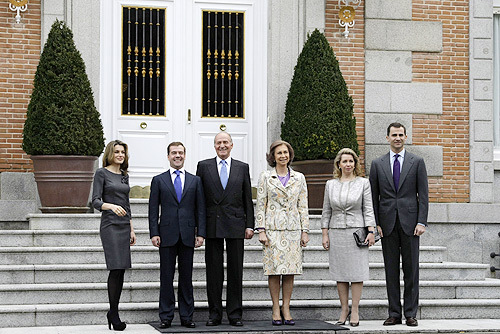
- Members of the Spanish royal family with guests at the palace in 2009
- Interactive map of the Zarzuela Palace area

General information
- Architectural style: Baroque
- Location: Madrid, Spain
- Coordinates: 40°29′00″N 3°48′06″W
- Current tenants: King Felipe VI and his family.
- Construction started: 1627
- Completed: 1635
- Owner: Patrimonio Nacional

Design and construction
- Architects: Juan Gómez de Mora; Alonso Carbonel
- Other designers: Diego Méndez

The Zarzuela Palace (Spanish: Palacio de la Zarzuela [paˈlaθjo ðe la θaɾˈθwela]) is the primary residence of the monarch of Spain, although the official residence of the Spanish royal family is the Royal Palace of Madrid. The Zarzuela Palace is on the outskirts of Madrid, near the Royal Palace of El Pardo, which accommodates visiting heads of state. The palace is owned by the Spanish government and administered by a state agency named Patrimonio Nacional (National Heritage).

The Zarzuela Palace was the home of King Juan Carlos I from May 1962 until his departure to live abroad in August 2020, following allegations of financial impropriety. His wife, Queen Sofía, who did not accompany Juan Carlos abroad, continues to reside with her son and his family at Zarzuela. Although King Felipe VI has his office in the palace, he and his family live in the Pabellón del Príncipe on the grounds just east of the Zarzuela Palace.

== History ==
During the 17th century, King Philip IV of Spain ordered a country palace or hunting lodge to be built in La Zarzuela near Madrid. The name "Zarzuela" is thought to be derived from the word zarzas meaning brambles, as the palace was situated amongst the brambles of the king's hunting grounds. It was a rectangular, slate-roofed building with two lateral arcades. King Charles IV had the building altered to adapt it to 18th-century fashion and adorned it with tapestries and porcelain, as well as furniture and his much-loved clocks.

== Royal residence ==
Prince Juan Carlos and his wife Sofía moved into the palace in May 1962. After the death of dictator Francisco Franco in November 1975, the new king decided not to occupy the Royal Palace of El Pardo, leaving it for foreign state guests, designating the Palacio de la Moncloa as the residence of the President of the Spanish Government, while they remained at Zarzuela. The Royal Palace of Madrid, the former principal residence of the Spanish monarchs, is the official residence of the monarch, although it is now used only for state occasions.

The palace ceased to be Juan Carlos's residence after he moved abroad in August 2020 in response to allegations of financial impropriety, mainly undeclared funds allegedly held in tax havens.

During the summer of 2002, King Felipe VI, then Prince of Asturias, moved into a new residence, a 3,150-square-metre (33,900 sq ft) pavilion built within the grounds of the Zarzuela Palace.

== Opera ==
The palace theatre was the place of origin of the Spanish genre of musical drama, zarzuela.
