= Royal Palace of Riofrío =

Coordinates: 40°52′25″N 4°09′03″W

- Palacio Real de Riofrío (Spanish)
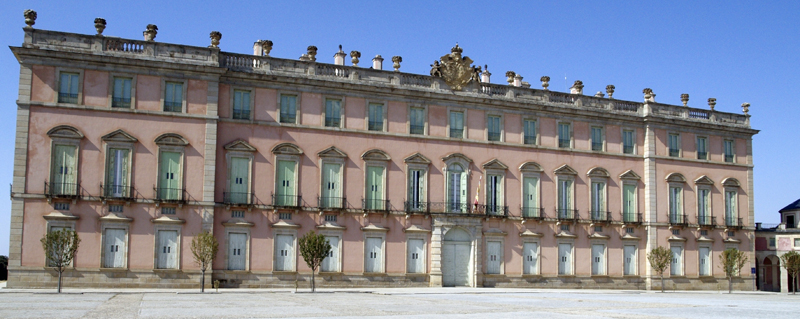
- Interactive map of Royal Palace of Riofrío
- Location: Navas de Riofrío, Spain

History
- Built: 1752-1759
- Built for: Elisabeth Farnese

Site notes
- Architect: Virgilio Rabaglio
- Architectural style: Italian baroque
- Governing body: Patrimonio Nacional

Spanish Cultural Heritage
- Official name: Palacio Real de Riofrío
- Type: Non-movable
- Criteria: Monument
- Designated: 1931
- Reference no.: RI-51-0001065

The Royal Palace of Riofrío (Spanish: Palacio Real de Riofrío, pronounced [paˈlaθjo reˈal de ri.oˈfɾi.o]) is one of the residences of the Spanish royal family. It is under the management of Patrimonio Nacional, a government agency dedicated to the care and maintenance of properties owned by the Spanish state which the royal family uses. The building is set in a wooded deer-park in the municipality of San Ildefonso, in the province of Segovia, central Spain.

The palace is Italian style with a square floor plan and three stories high, designed by the Italian architect Virgilio Rabaglio in the image and likeness of the Royal Palace of Madrid. It is surrounded by an extensive forest of 625 hectares, where fallow deer and deer, among others, live. Used by the monarchs exclusively for hunting, it has only been inhabited as a habitual residence, on a temporary basis, by King Alfonso XII and, previously, by his father, Francisco de Asís, the King Consort.

== History ==
Queen Elisabeth Farnese was widowed in 1746, her husband King Philip V being succeeded by Ferdinand VI, her step-son. As such, to ensure that Elisabeth would remain away from the court, King Ferdinand VI agreed to construct a palace at Riofrío for her own disposal. During the reign of her step-son, the queen resided at the Royal Palace of La Granja de San Ildefonso.

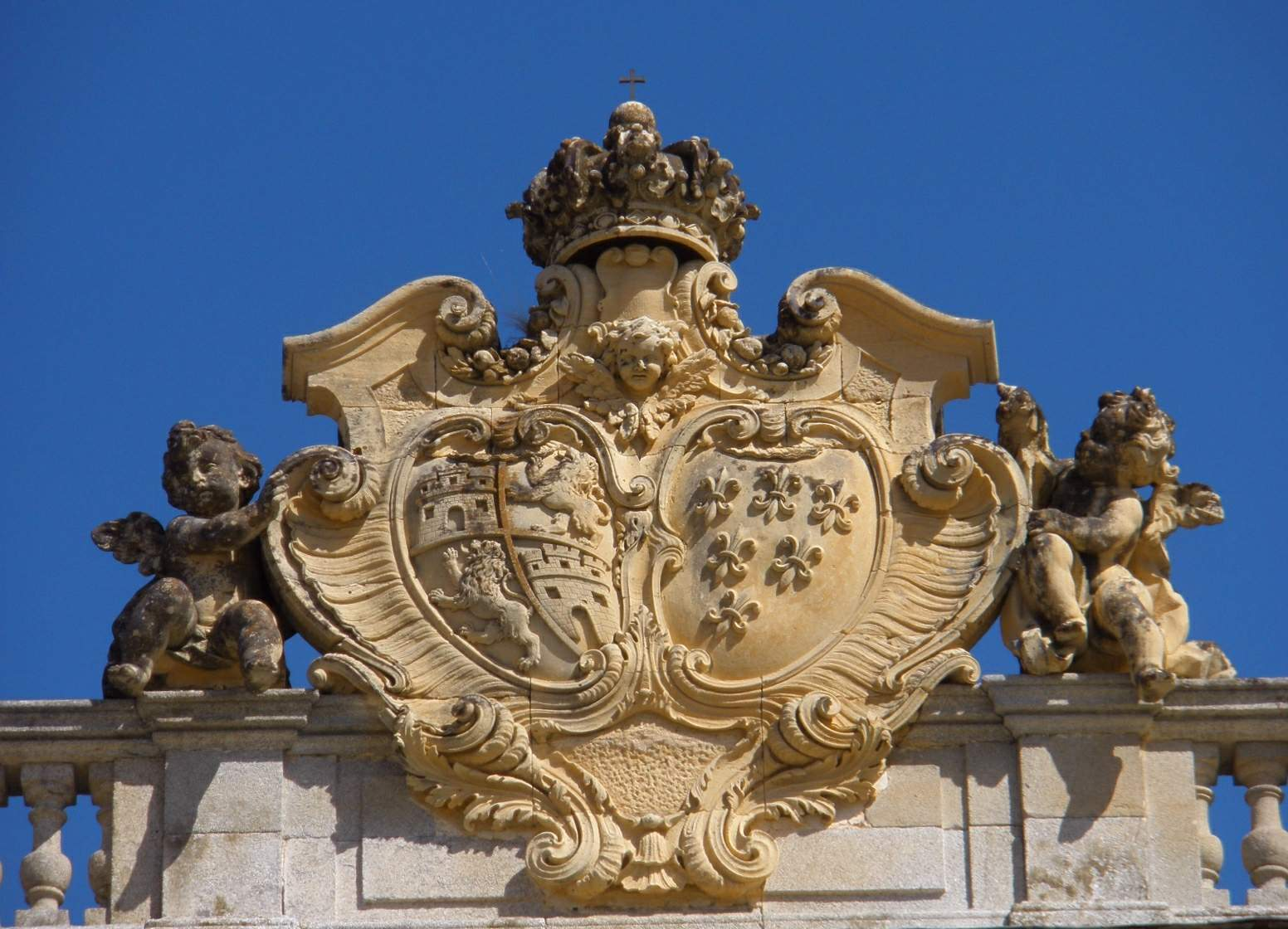
Shield of Queen Elisabeth Farnese in the main façade.

Built in an enclave of the town of San Ildefonso in Segovia, it is some 11 miles from the town that gives its name to the municipality. It is close to the towns of Navas de Riofrío and La Losa. The palace was designed in the Italian style, echoing Elisabeth's birth in the Duchy of Parma, northern Italy. It was designed with a central square and was given three stories high, designed by architect Virgilio Rabaglio, himself Swiss from Gandria near Lugano. The palace is often likened to its counterpart, the Royal Palace of Madrid, official residence of the Spanish royal family.

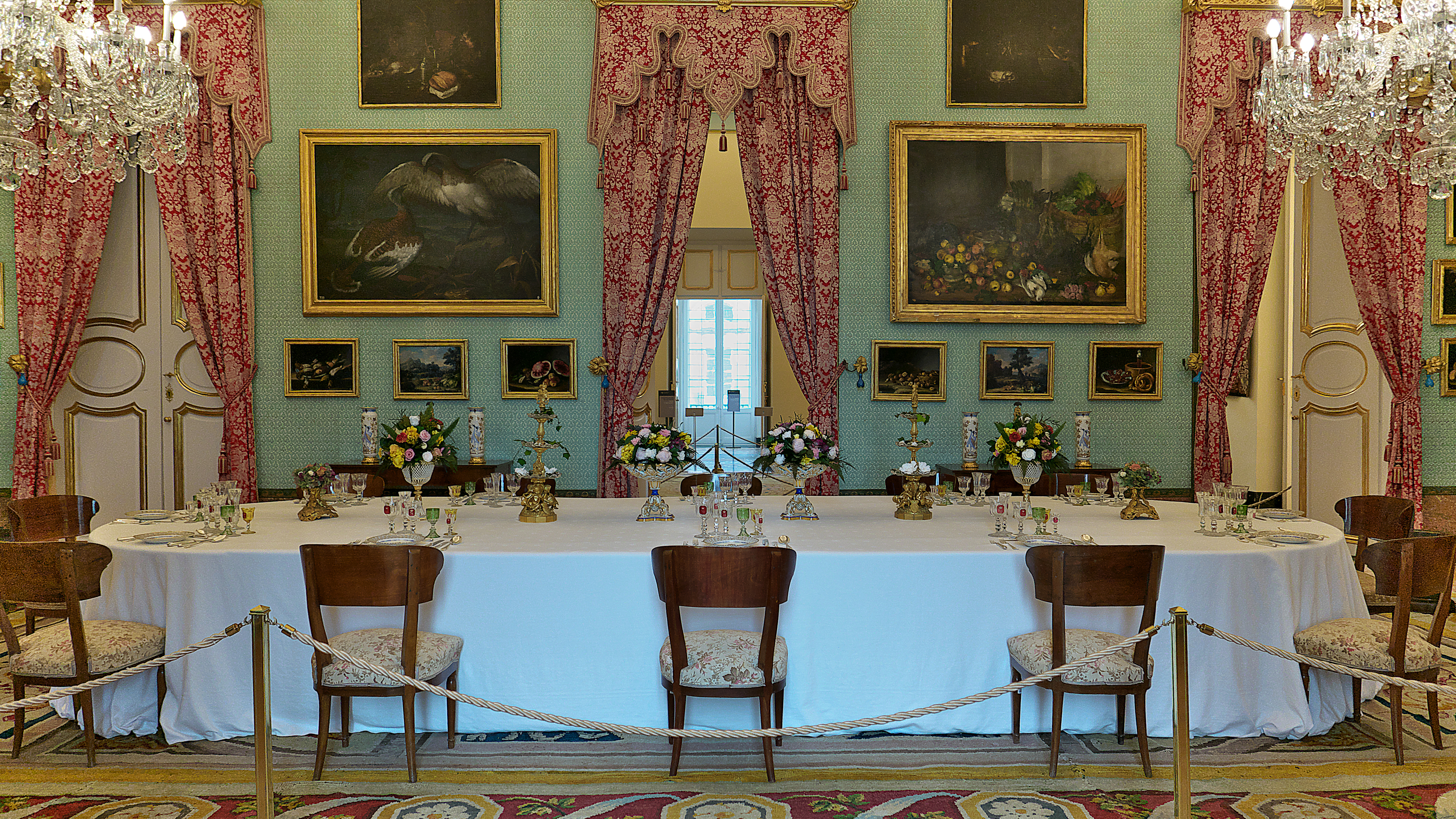
Dining room.

The dowager queen had wanted her son, then King Charles VII of Naples to succeed the Spanish throne. However, before the works were completed, King Ferdinand VI died childless in August 1759 and was thus succeeded by King Charles VII, who was recognised as King Charles III of Spain. Elisabeth was created regent till her son's arrival in Spain and subsequently resided at the Royal Palace of Aranjuez, dying there in 1766 having never lived at Riofrío. Elisabeth had succeeded in placing four of her children on thrones and intended to give the property to her youngest son, Infante Luis, Count of Chinchón, however he did not use it.

Having been abandoned, it was completed as a hunting lodge and was only used when royalty hunted in the nearby forests. Maria Josepha Amalia of Saxony resided there to avoid the court's disapproval of her childless marriage to King Ferdinand VII. The palace was also used by Francis, king consort of Queen Isabella II to avoid his wife and used later still by King Alfonso XII, who resided there while mourning his beloved wife Queen Maria de las Mercedes. Points of interest within the palace include the patio addition, grand staircase, chapel along with its collection of paintings, tapestries and furniture. It is surrounded by a vast forest of 625 hectares, home to deer among other animals. Today Riofrío is the home of a museum dedicated to the history of hunting.

== See also ==
- List of Baroque residences
