= Royal Palace of El Pardo =

Coordinates: 40°31′16″N 3°46′30″W

- Palacio Real de El Pardo
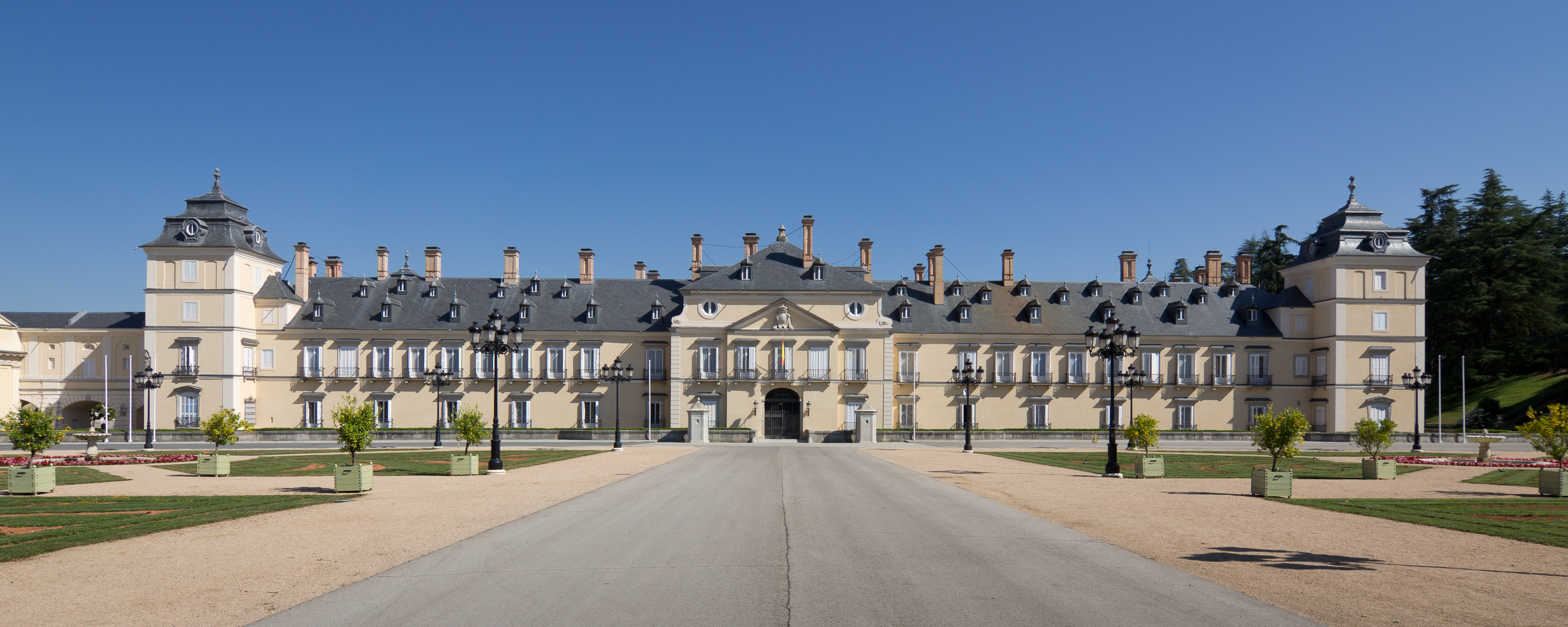
- Main façade
- Interactive map of the Royal Palace of El Pardo area

General information
- Architectural style: Spanish Renaissance, Neoclassical
- Location: Madrid, Spain

Design and construction
- Architects: Luis de Vega; Francesco Sabatini

Spanish Cultural Heritage
- Official name: Palacio Real de El Pardo
- Type: Non-movable
- Criteria: Monument
- Designated: 1931
- Reference no.: RI-51-0001062

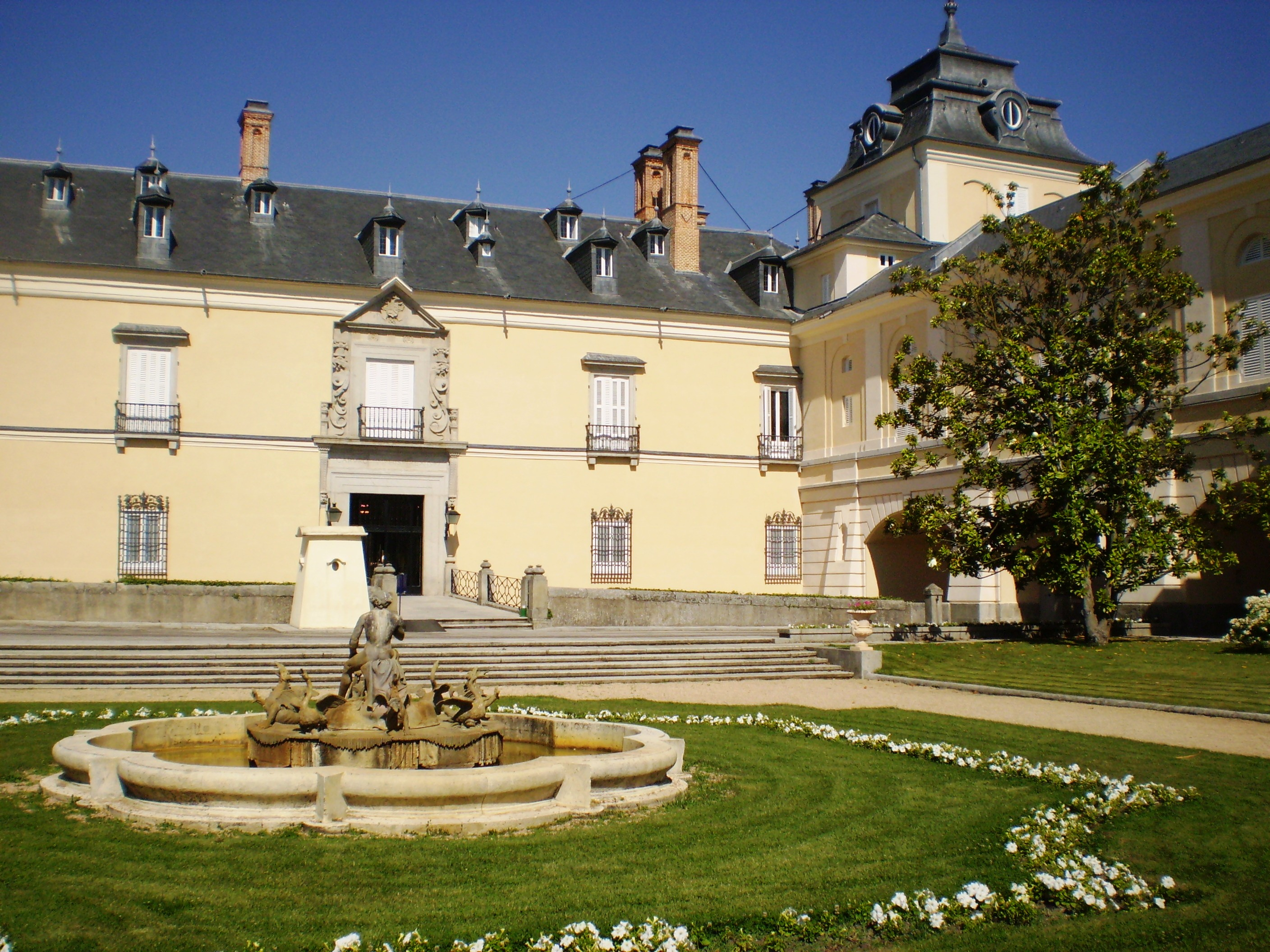
Lateral facade of the palace, both with the Patio de los Austrias.

The Royal Palace of El Pardo (Spanish: Palacio Real de El Pardo, pronounced [paˈlaθjo reˈal de el ˈpaɾðo]) is one of the official residences of the Spanish royal family and one of the oldest, being used by the Spanish monarchs since Henry III of Castile in the 15th century. The palace is owned by the Spanish government, administered by a state agency named Patrimonio Nacional (National Heritage) and it currently serves as a state guest house.

== Overview ==
The palace began as a royal hunting lodge on the hill of El Pardo. It became an alternative residence of the kings of Spain until the reign of King Alfonso XII, who died in the palace in 1885.

King Henry III of Castile ordered the building of a small castle in 1406, on Mount El Pardo, because of its abundant game. In the 1540s, on the orders of Charles V, Holy Roman Emperor, it was transformed into a palace by the architect Luis de Vega, who built a small, traditional alcázar with a moat. The palace was completed by Philip II, who introduced Flemish-style slate roofs.

On 13 March 1604, a massive fire destroyed many of the paintings the palace housed, including masterpieces by Titian. Phillip III entrusted the rebuilding of the palace to Francisco de Mora. Philip continued his father's decorative ideas, commissioning a number of frescoes. Philip V lived there for three months a year during the winter, and altered the palace to accommodate the court.

King Charles III of Spain renovated the building in the 18th century, appointing his architect Francesco Sabatini to undertake the job and add additional courtyards.

The interior decoration includes a ceiling frescoed by Gaspar Becerra, and paintings by Vincenzo Carducci and Cabrera.

In 1739, the palace hosted talks between the governments of Great Britain and Spain, who eventually agreed to the Convention of Pardo in a bid to avert a war. However, the Convention failed to prevent the War of Jenkins' Ear from breaking out shortly afterwards.

Dictator Francisco Franco commandeered the palace as his residence after the Spanish Civil War and lived there until his death.

== Access ==
Since 1983, the building has been used as a residence for visiting heads of state. When not in use by guests, it is open to the public. Objects on display include tapestries made by the Royal Factory of Santa Bárbara in Madrid. Goya was one of the artists who designed tapestries for the palace with dimensions corresponding to specific locations in the building.

== See also ==
- Casita del Principe (El Pardo), a related building for recreational use
- Palace of Zarzuela, nearby royal residence
- Ward of El Pardo
