= Mundial Kiosk =

- Mundial, Chiringuito
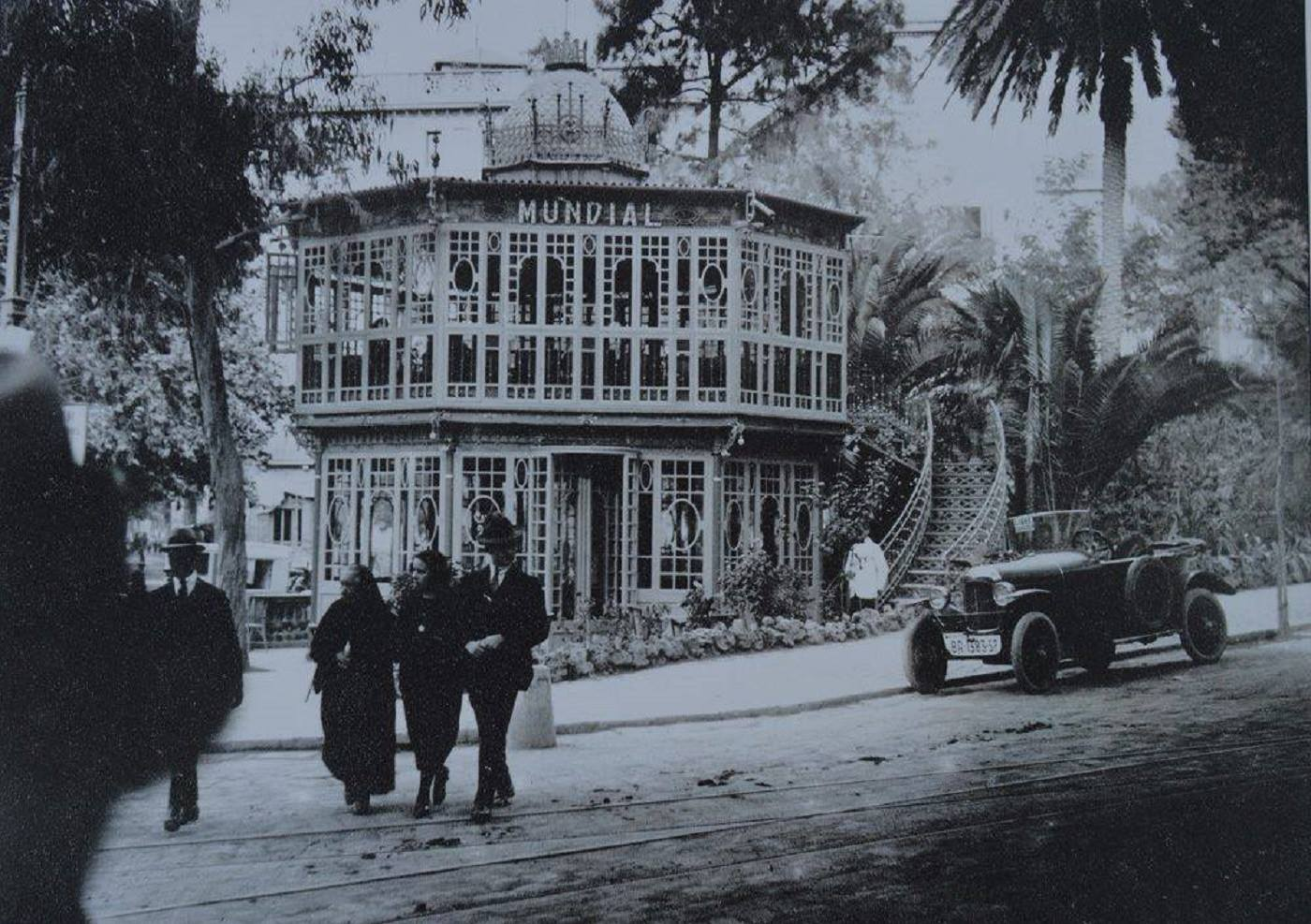
- Mundial Kiosk, circa 1925
- Interactive map of the Mundial Kiosk area

General information
- Architectural style: Art Nouveau
- Location: Palma de Mallorca, Balearic Islands, Spain
- Construction started: ca 1900
- Completed: 1924
- Demolished: 1949

Technical details
- Structural system: Cast-iron architecture
- Material: Wrought iron, wood, glass

The Mundial Kiosk (popularly known as Mundial or also Chiringuito) was a popular kiosk in Palma de Mallorca (Balearic Islands, Spain) of notable artistic and architectural Art Nouveau value. It was located in the current Joan Alcover Gardens, in the city's Plaça de la Reina. It was built at the beginning of the 20th century, expanded in 1914 and definitively built in 1924. It was demolished in 1949.

== History ==
At the beginning of 20th century there was already a small wooden kiosk in the Plaza de la Reina in Palma (then called de la Libertad) dedicated to the sale of soft drinks, like many others in any part of the city. In 1905 Bernat Cortés Fuster obtained the concession, a small businessman responsible for the small establishment growing over the years. Towards June 1914 Cortés built a new kiosk, coinciding with the inauguration by the Palma City Council of the new landscaping in the area. This was more spacious and included an outdoor terrace; but aesthetically it still didn’t have a singular appearance or significant architectural value, nor the name with which he was met later.

=== The Mundial ===
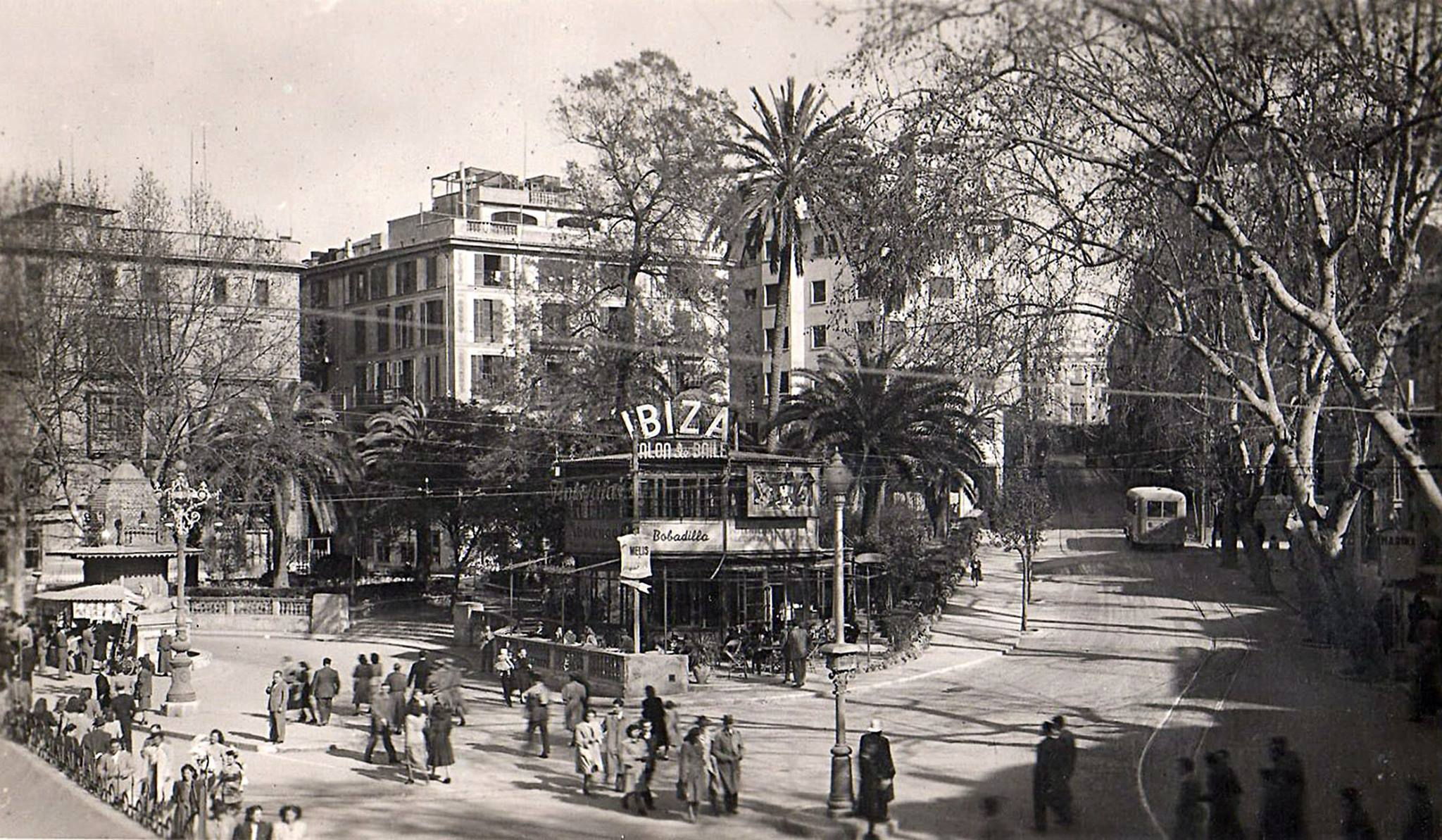
Mundial, circa 1948

At the beginning of 1924, Bernat Cortés proposed to the City Council build a new building. It was completed in the middle of the year and was a prominent exponent of Cast-iron architecture: it consisted of an irregular octagonal plan (rather square, with the corners cut out) with a plan and floor, a structure of wrought iron, large windows and aesthetics close to Art Nouveau, with a hybrid appearance between gloriette and greenhouse. On the ground floor the building maintained the function of a refreshment kiosk and on the upper floor it added a bookstore, with a reading room and sale of foreign press. Then the place was named as Mundial.

This construction was definitive one and the most popular. It become one of the main meeting points and local gatherings in the city. It appeared in numerous postcards of the time as one of the most striking architectural elements of the city, given its strategic location in the heart of the urban center and close to key elements of the city such as Es Born, La Almudaina, the Círculo Mallorquín (current Parliament of the Balearic Islands) or the missing Teatro Lírico and Hotel Alhambra (current Jardins de s'Hort del Rei), in addition to being facing the Port, then main arrival point to the city.

Over time, several advertising panels were placed on its façade, which damaged its artistic and visual value, and the building began to deteriorate. Also its location meant that it was seen as a hindrance to expanding the Joan Alcover Gardens. In 1933 Bernat Cortés left the concession of the premises to others, who subsequently did not improve the situation of the building. Public opinion was increasingly adverse and the kiosk was demolished in mid-1949, once the municipal concession had expired and with the excuse of carrying out the urban reform of the area.
