= Infante Alfonso of Spain =

Spanish infante (1941–1956)

Infante Alfonso
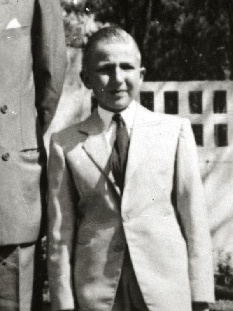
- Alfonso, aged 9
- Born: 3 October 1941; Rome, Kingdom of Italy
- Died: 29 March 1956 (aged 14); Estoril, Portugal
- Burial: Cascais, Portugal (1956–1992); El Escorial, Madrid, Spain (since 1992)
Names
- Alfonso Cristino Teresa Ángelo Francisco de Asís y Todos los Santos (et omnes sancti) de Borbón y Borbón-Dos Sicilias
- House: Bourbon
- Father: Infante Juan, Count of Barcelona
- Mother: Princess María de las Mercedes of Bourbon-Two Sicilies

Infante Alfonso of Spain (Don Alfonso Cristino Teresa Ángelo Francisco de Asís y Todos los Santos de Borbón y Borbón Dos-Sicilias; 3 October 1941 – 29 March 1956) was the younger brother of King Juan Carlos I of Spain. He was also the youngest son of Infante Juan, Count of Barcelona and Princess María de las Mercedes of Bourbon-Two Sicilies, and the grandson of King Alfonso XIII. He died young at 14 from a shot to the forehead by Juan Carlos' gun, in unclear circumstances.

== Early life ==
Alfonso was born at Hotel NH Firenze Anglo American in Rome, the youngest son of the Infante Juan of Spain, Count of Barcelona, and of his wife, Princess Maria Mercedes of Bourbon-Two Sicilies. His godfather was the Infante Alfonso de Orleans y Borbón; his godmother was his father's sister Infanta Maria Cristina of Spain. Within his own family, he was called Alfonsito to distinguish him from other family members with the name Alfonso.

When Alfonso was still just a baby, his family moved to Lausanne in Switzerland where they lived in the Villa Les Rocailles. In February 1946, the family moved to the Portuguese Riviera.

In 1947, Alfonso visited Spain for the first time at the invitation of caudillo Francisco Franco. In 1950, he and his brother Juan Carlos were sent to study in Spain. At first, they lived in San Sebastián where a private school had been established in the Miramar Palace. In June 1954, they were received by General Franco at the Pardo Palace. Later, Alfonso and Juan Carlos attended the military academy in Zaragoza.

== Death and burial ==
Coat of arms of Infante Alfonso

On the evening of Maundy Thursday, 29 March 1956, Alfonso and Juan Carlos were at their parents' home Villa Giralda in Estoril, Portugal, for the Easter vacation, where Alfonso died in a gun accident. The Spanish Embassy in Portugal issued an official communiqué:

Whilst His Highness the Infante Alfonso was cleaning a revolver last evening with his brother, a shot was fired hitting his forehead and killing him in a few minutes. The accident took place at 20.30 hours, after the Infante's return from the Maundy Thursday religious service, during which he had received Holy Communion.

Alfonso had won a local junior golf tournament earlier on the day, then went to evening Mass and rushed up to the room to see Juan Carlos who had come home for the Easter holidays from military school. It is alleged that Juan Carlos began playing with a .22 caliber revolver that had apparently been given to Alfonso by General Francisco Franco. Rumors appeared in newspapers that the .22 caliber revolver had actually been held by Juan Carlos at the moment the shot was fired.

As they were the only two in the room, it is unclear how Alfonso was shot but according to Josefina Carolo, dressmaker to Juan Carlos's mother, Juan Carlos pointed the pistol at Alfonso and pulled the trigger, unaware that the pistol was loaded. Bernardo Arnoso, a Portuguese friend of Juan Carlos, also said that Juan Carlos fired the pistol not knowing that it was loaded, and adding that the bullet ricocheted off a wall hitting Alfonso in the face. Helena Matheopoulos, a Greek author who spoke with Juan Carlos's sister Pilar, said that Alfonso had been out of the room and when he returned and pushed the door open, the door knocked Juan Carlos in the arm causing him to fire the pistol.

In his 2025 autobiography Juan Carlos I d’Espagne: Réconciliation, Juan Carlos recounted how he and Alfonso had been playing with the gun, believing it to be safe as the magazine had been removed, without realising there was a bullet in the chamber, and that he had shot his brother in the forehead.

It is alleged that Infante Juan, Count of Barcelona, the children's father, threw the gun into the sea some time after Alfonso's death.

The funeral liturgy for Alfonso was held on Holy Saturday and was presided over by Monsignor Fernando Cento, Apostolic Nuncio to Portugal. He was buried at the municipal cemetery in Cascais, Portugal. In October 1992, he was re-buried in the Pantheon of the Princes of El Escorial near Madrid.

== Bibliography ==
- Zavala, José M. Dos infantes y un destino. Barcelona: Plaza & Janés, 1998. ISBN 84-01-55006-8.
- "Son Born to Spanish Pretender". The New York Times ( 4 October 1941): 17.
- "Funeral of Infante Don Alfonso". The Times ( 2 April 1956): 8.
- "Don Juan's Son Is Killed in Spanish Gun Accident". The New York Times ( 30 March 1956): 3.
- Mikkelson, Barbara. "A Royal Mystery".
