= Palace of Marivent =

Spanish royal family summer residence

- Palacio de Marivent
- Interactive map of the Palace of Marivent area

General information
- Location: Cala Mayor, Palma de Mallorca, Spain
- Coordinates: 39.5502°N 2.6115°E
- Construction started: 1923
- Completed: 1925
- Client: Spanish royal family
- Owner: Government of the Balearic Islands

Design and construction
- Architect: Guillem Forteza Pinya

The Palace of Marivent (which in English means Palace of Sea and Wind) is a modern palace built in the 1920s and located in the tourist area of Cala Mayor in Palma de Mallorca, Spain. Since the 1970s, this palace has been the summer residence of the Spanish royal family, although their official residence in the Balearic Islands is the Royal Palace of La Almudaina. This is also the favourite palace of Queen Sofía, being the place where she lives most of the year.

Unlike the official residence of the Royal Palace of La Almudaina, Marivent does not belong to the set of residences of the Spanish royal family property of the Patrimonio Nacional state agency, but its ownership corresponds to the Autonomous Community of the Balearic Islands. Despite this nature of a private residence, the Marivent Palace has served, on many occasions, as a setting for the receptions and interviews that the monarch offers both the prime minister of Spain and other international authorities.

== History ==
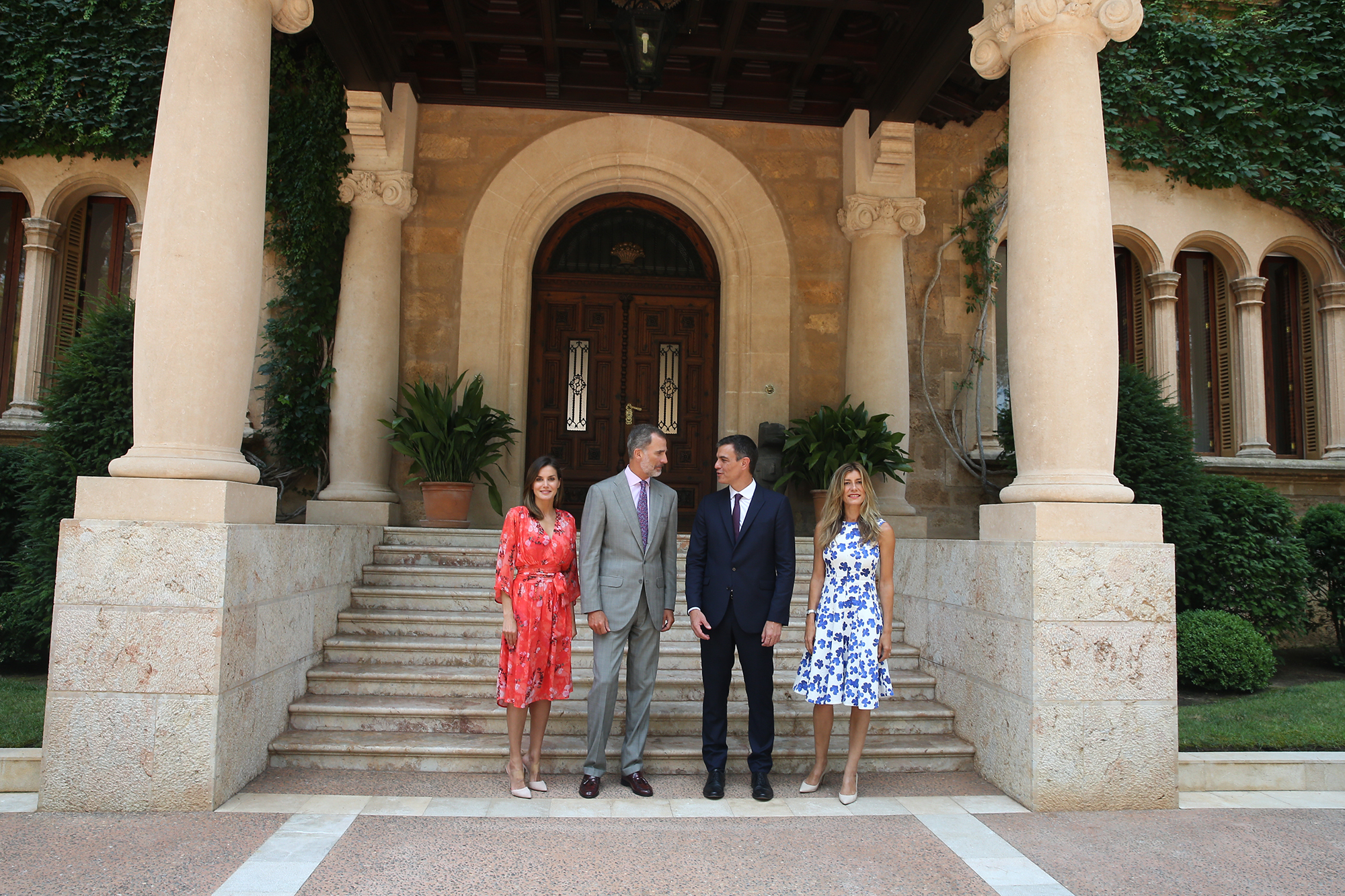
King Felipe VI and Queen Letizia meet prime minister Pedro Sánchez and his wife, Begoña Gómez, at Marivent Palace in August 2018.

The property was designed by the architect Guillem Forteza Pinya between 1923 and 1925, commissioned by the painter Juan de Saridakis, who lived there until his death. His widow, Anunciación Marconi Taffani, gave the building and its land to the Balearic Provincial Council in 1966, on condition that a museum be created bearing the name of the painter, and that it remained open to the public.

These conditions were met until 1973 when the Provincial Council ceded the estate to the then Princes of Spain (Juan Carlos and Sofía), a fact that caused the descendants of Saridakis to sue the provincial authorities to the courts for non-compliance with the conditions of transfer, and to recover the movable property of the interior of the palace belonging to his family.

However, sources of the autonomous government in the 1980s, on which the palace depended, declared that "We are relatively little concerned that these goods are taken, since they have little value", forty million pesetas not the three billion that the heirs of painter Juan de Saridakis claimed.

== See also ==
- Royal Residence of La Mareta
