= Royal Residence of La Mareta =

Spanish royal family residence

- Residencia Real de La Mareta
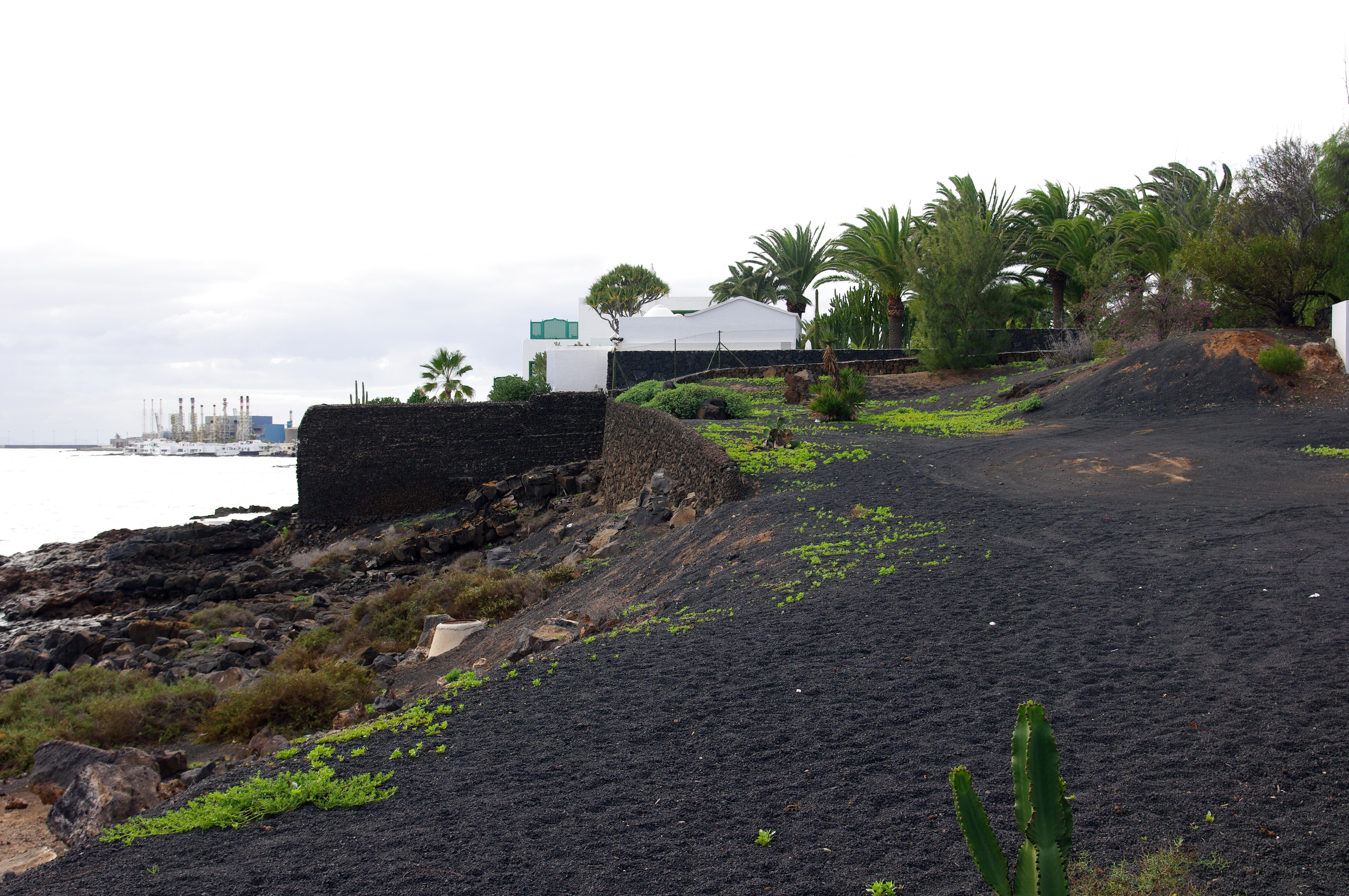
- Interactive map of the Royal Residence of La Mareta area

General information
- Location: Teguise, Lanzarote, Spain
- Coordinates: 28.987627°N 13.505341°W
- Construction started: 1970s
- Client: Spanish royal family
- Owner: Patrimonio Nacional

Design and construction
- Architect: César Manrique

The Royal Residence of La Mareta is a Spanish royal family residence located in the municipality of Teguise, in the island of Lanzarote. The residence has also been used as a holiday residence by some Spanish prime ministers.

The palace-house was commanded to build by King Hussein of Jordan in the late 1970s and was designed by Spanish architect César Manrique. Its name is due to the fact that in the same place there was a mareta, that is to say, a cistern that served to collect rainwater and as an animal drinker.

== History ==
King Hussein of Jordan ordered the construction of this residence by the sea in the town of Costa Teguise, in the municipality of Teguise, northeast of Lanzarote. Hussein never stayed in it but one of his sons spent a vacation period there after his wedding. In 1989, Hussein gave the house to King Juan Carlos I, who in turn gave it to Patrimonio Nacional.

Since then, the Spanish royal family has frequented La Mareta as a holiday place, although its main holiday destination has been the Palace of Marivent, in Mallorca. The first time the royal family spent the holidays in this residence was after the death of Infante Juan, Count of Barcelona, the King's father, in 1993. In this residence, the King's mother, Princess María de las Mercedes, Countess of Barcelona, died in 2000.

In 2015, after assuming the throne, King Felipe VI ordered the Industry Minister, José Manuel Soria, to reach an agreement with the chair of Patrimonio Nacional, Alfredo Pérez de Armiñán, to allocate the residence to promote the tourist interests of region of the Canary Islands and Spain. The main idea of this agreement was to invite to the residence important personalities to promote those interests.

== Guests ==
- In 1992, German chancellor Helmut Kohl stayed in the residence during the German-Spanish summit.
- In 1992, former President of the Soviet Union Mikhail Gorbachev and his wife, Raisa Gorbacheva spent three weeks at the property.
- German chancellor Gerhard Schröder.
- Between 1997 and 2002 former president of the Czech Republic Václav Havel used the residence several times.
- Spanish Prime Minister José María Aznar used this residence in 2000.
- Deputy Prime Minister Rodrigo Rato.
- Spanish Prime Minister José Luis Rodríguez Zapatero used this residence many times during his premiership (2004-2011).
- The Prince and Princess of Asturias along with her daughter Leonor in 2005.
- The President of Kazakhstan Nursultan Nazarbayev.
- Prime Minister Pedro Sánchez has used it as his regular holiday residence during his premiership.

== See also ==
- Spanish royal sites
