= El Escorial =

Monastery and historical residence of the king of Spain

Royal Site of San Lorenzo de El Escorial
- Real Sitio de San Lorenzo de El Escorial
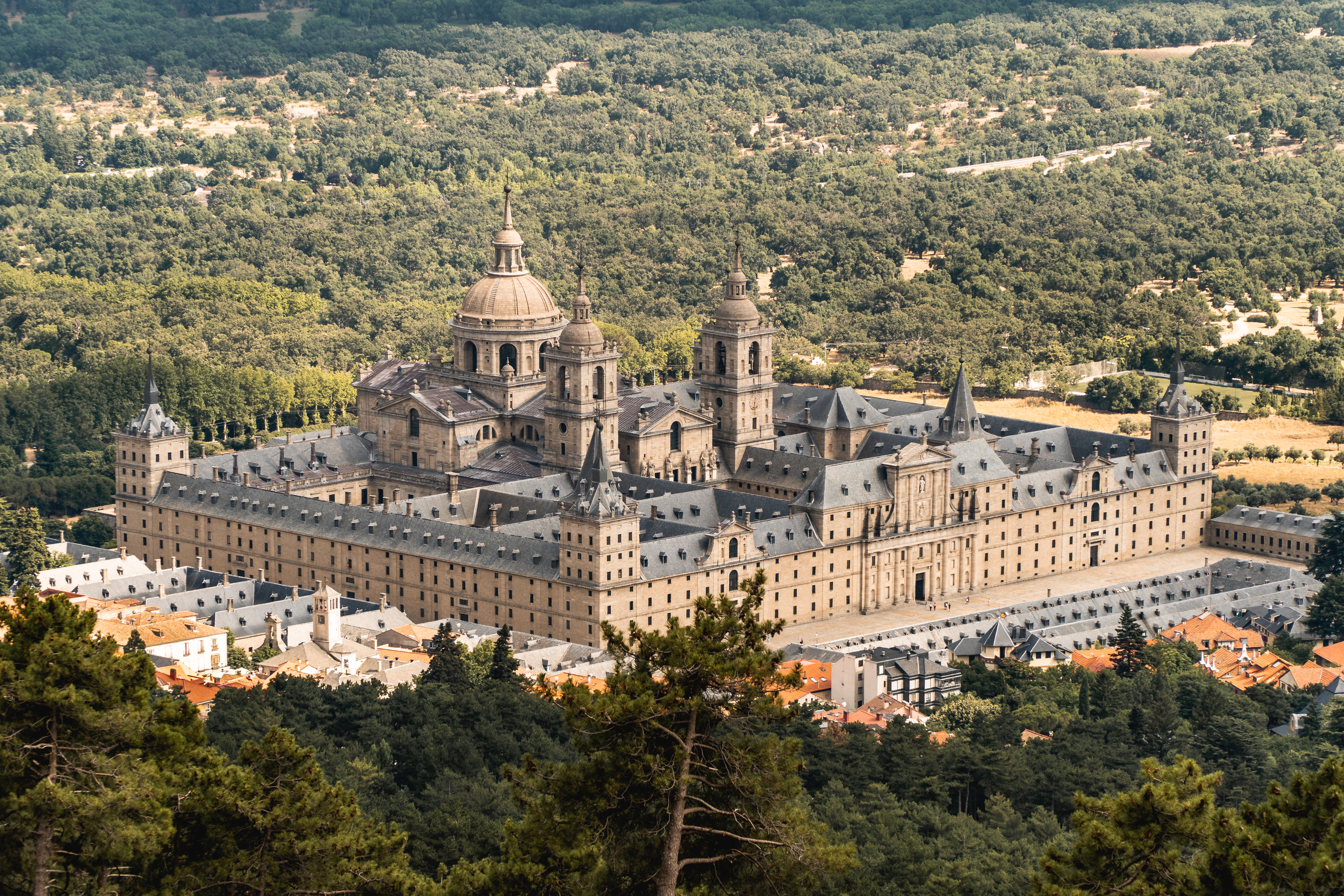
- The site in 2018
- Alternative names: Monastery of El Escorial

General information
- Architectural style: Herrerian style
- Location: San Lorenzo de El Escorial, Spain
- Coordinates: 40.59°N 4.15°W
- Operator: Patrimonio Nacional

Design and construction
- Architect: Juan Bautista de Toledo

UNESCO World Heritage Site
- Official name: Monastery and Site of the Escorial, Madrid
- Criteria: Cultural: (i), (ii), (iv)
- Designated: 1984 (8th session)
- Reference no.: 318
- Region: Europe and North America

Spanish Cultural Heritage
- Official name: Monasterio de San Lorenzo
- Type: Non-movable
- Criteria: Monument
- Designated: 3 June 1931
- Reference no.: RI-51-0001064

The Royal Site of San Lorenzo de El Escorial (Spanish: Monasterio y Sitio de El Escorial en Madrid), also called Monasterio de El Escorial (Spanish pronunciation: [el eskoˈɾjal]) or simply El Escorial, is a historical residence of the king of Spain located in the town of San Lorenzo de El Escorial, 2.06 kilometres (1.28 mi) up the valley (4.1 km [2.5 mi] road distance) from the town of El Escorial and about 45 kilometres (28 mi) northwest of the Spanish capital Madrid. Built between 1563 and 1584 by order of King Philip II (who reigned 1556–1598), El Escorial is the largest Renaissance building in the world. It is one of the Spanish royal sites and functions as a monastery, basilica, royal palace, pantheon, library, museum, university, school, and hospital.

El Escorial consists of two architectural complexes of great historical and cultural significance: the royal monastery itself and La Granjilla de La Fresneda, a royal hunting lodge and monastic retreat about five kilometres (3.1 mi) away. These sites have a dual nature: during the 16th and 17th centuries, they were places in which the power of the Spanish monarchy and the ecclesiastical predominance of the Catholic religion in Spain found a common architectural manifestation. El Escorial was both a Spanish royal palace and a monastery. Established with a community of Hieronymite monks, it has become a monastery of the Order of Saint Augustine. It also contained a boarding school, now the Real Colegio de Alfonso XII, still in operation.

Philip II engaged the Spanish architect Juan Bautista de Toledo to be his collaborator in the building of the complex at El Escorial. Toledo had spent the greater part of his career in Rome, where he had worked on St. Peter's Basilica, and in Naples serving the king's viceroy, whose recommendation brought him to the king's attention. Philip appointed him architect-royal in 1559, and, together, they designed El Escorial as a monument to Spain's role as a center of the Christian world.

On 2 November 1984, UNESCO declared The Royal Seat of San Lorenzo of El Escorial a World Heritage Site. It is a popular tourist attraction, often visited by day-trippers from Madrid—more than 500,000 visitors come to El Escorial every year.

== Conception and design ==
El Escorial is situated at the foot of Mount Abantos in the Sierra de Guadarrama. This austere location, hardly an obvious choice for the site of a royal palace, was chosen by King Philip II of Spain, and it was he who ordained the building of a grand edifice here to commemorate the 1557 Spanish victory at the Battle of St. Quentin in Picardy against King Henry II of France. King Phillip II's goal was to have a princely mansion in a wooded countryside, while also being architecturally different from most buildings that were being commissioned at the time. Phillip's decision to do this was inspired by his journeys in Europe exploring architecture, including the Ospedale Maggiore that inspired ideas for the design of the Escorial. One of Phillip II's personal aspirations was to be a monk and a monarch, and this would come to influence the design. The result of all these ideas was an imposing three story tall, orthogonal, stronghold-like structure with a dual function as both a royal residence and monastery. Philip also intended the complex to serve as a necropolis for the interment of the remains of his parents, Charles I and Isabella of Portugal, himself, and his descendants. In addition, Philip envisioned El Escorial as a center for studies in aid of the Counter-Reformation cause. The Escorial would come to be so iconic that the design of the building became a new architectural style of Spanish renaissance architecture, known as the Herrerian style.

The building's cornerstone was laid on 23 April 1563. The design and construction were overseen by Juan Bautista de Toledo, who did not live to see the completion of the project. With Toledo's death in 1567, direction passed to his apprentice, Juan de Herrera, who "is generally regarded as the architect of the Escorial". Under Herrera, the building was completed in 1584, in slightly less than 21 years. To this day, la obra de El Escorial ("the work of El Escorial") is a proverbial expression for a thing that takes a long time to finish (comparable English proverb: "Rome wasn't built in a day").

Since then, El Escorial has been the burial site for most of the Spanish kings of the last five centuries, Bourbons as well as Habsburgs. The Royal Pantheon contains the tombs of the Holy Roman Emperor Charles V (who ruled Spain as King Charles I), Philip II, Philip III, Philip IV, Charles II, Louis I, Charles III, Charles IV, Ferdinand VII, Isabella II, Alfonso XII, and Alfonso XIII. Two Bourbon kings, Philip V (who reigned from 1700 to 1724 and again from 1724 to 1746) and Ferdinand VI (1746–1759), as well as King Amadeus (1870–1873), are not buried in the monastery.

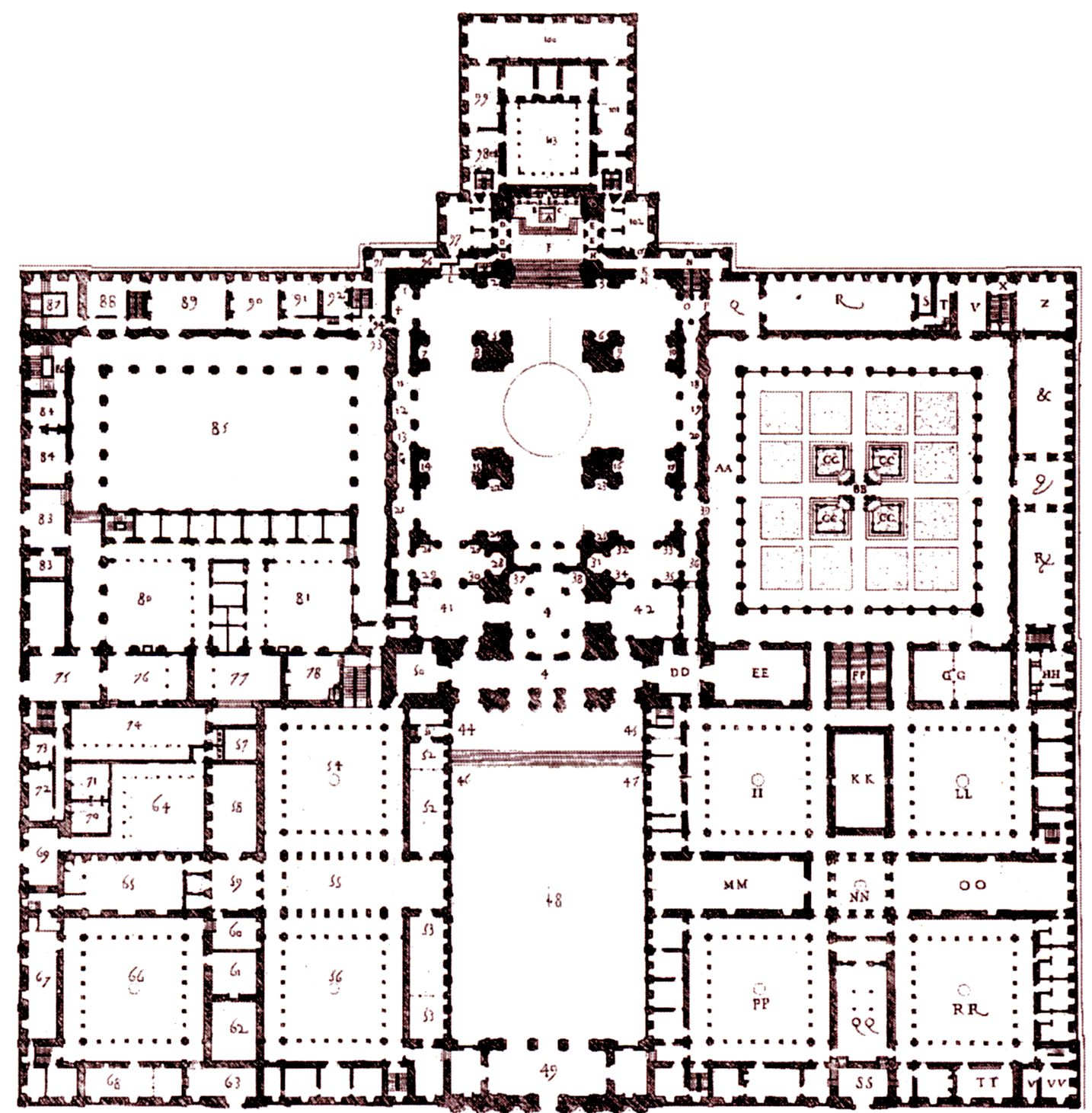
El Escorial: floor plan, based on that of Solomon's Temple

The floor plan of the building is in the form of a gridiron. The traditional belief is that this design was chosen in honor of Saint Lawrence, who, in the third century AD, was martyred by being roasted to death on a grill. St. Lawrence's feast day is 10 August, the same date as the 1557 Battle of St. Quentin.

However, the origin of the building's layout is quite controversial. The grill-like shape, which did not fully emerge until Juan de Herrera eliminated from the original conception the six interior towers of the façade, was not unique to El Escorial. Other buildings had been constructed with churches or chapels fronting on interior courtyards: King's College, Cambridge, dating from 1441, is one such example; the old Ospedale Maggiore, Milan's first hospital, begun in 1456 by Antonio Filarete, is another grid-like building with interior courtyards. In fact, palaces of this approximate design were commonplace in the Byzantine and Arab world. Strikingly similar to El Escorial is the layout of the Alcázar of Seville and the design of the Alhambra at Granada, where, as at El Escorial, two courtyards in succession separate the main portal of the complex from a fully enclosed place of worship.

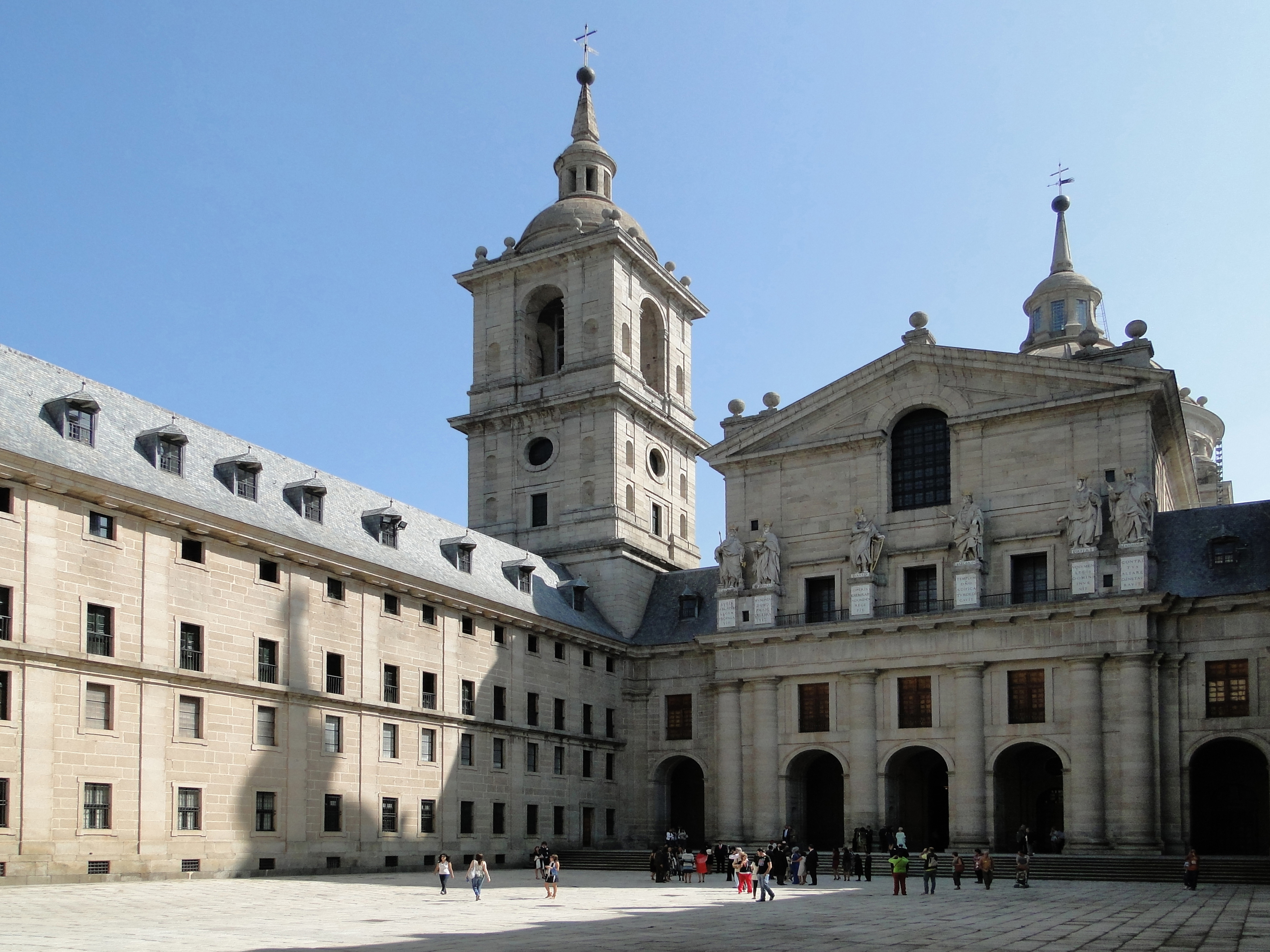
Courtyard of the Kings and the Basilica.

The most persuasive theory for the origin of the floor plan is that it is based on descriptions of the Temple of Solomon by the Judeo-Roman historian Flavius Josephus: a portico followed by a courtyard open to the sky, followed by a second portico and a second courtyard, all flanked by arcades and enclosed passageways, leading to the "holy of holies". Statues of David and Solomon on either side of the entrance to the basilica of El Escorial lend further weight to the theory that this is the true origin of the design. A more personal connection can be drawn between the David-warrior figure, representing Charles V, and his son, the stolid and solomonically prudent Philip II. Echoing the same theme, a fresco in the center of El Escorial's library, a reminder of Solomon's legendary wisdom, affirms Philip's preoccupation with the great Jewish king, his thoughtful and logical character, and his extraordinary, monumental temple.

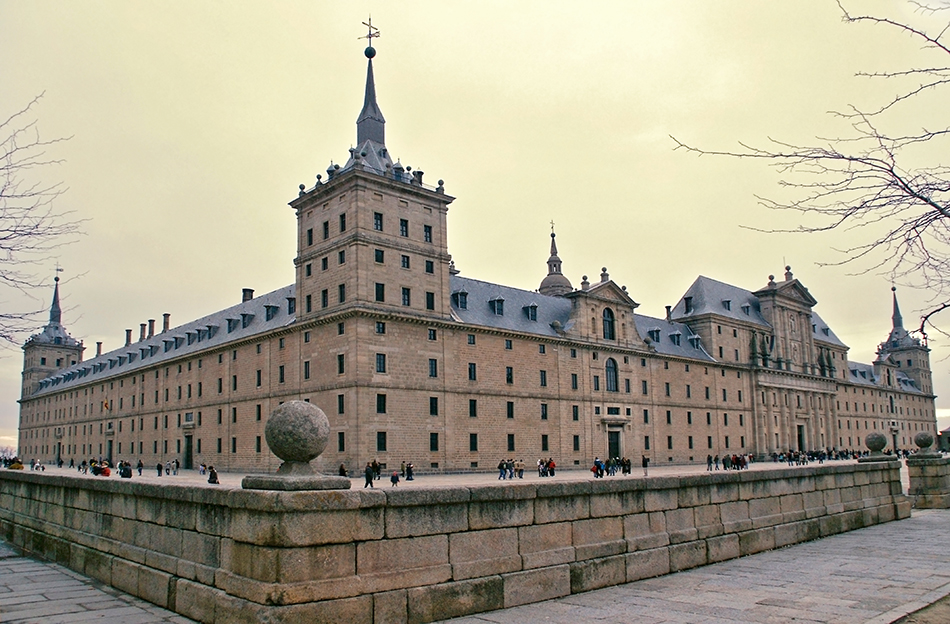
El Escorial. View from the northwest

The Temple of Solomon design, if indeed it was the basis for El Escorial, was extensively modified to accommodate the additional functions Philip II intended the building to serve. Besides being a monastery, El Escorial is also a pantheon, a basilica, a convent, a school, a library, and a royal palace. All these functional demands resulted in a doubling of the building's size from the time of its original conception.

Built primarily from locally quarried gray granite, square and sparsely ornamented, El Escorial is austere, even forbidding, in its outward appearance, seemingly more like a fortress than a monastery or palace. It takes the form of a gigantic quadrangle, approximately 224 by 153 metres (735 by 502 ft), which encloses a series of intersecting passageways and courtyards. At each of the four corners is a square tower surmounted by a spire, and, near the center of the complex (and taller than the rest), rise the pointed belfries and round dome of the basilica. Philip's instructions to Juan Bautista de Toledo were simple and clear, directing that the architects should produce "simplicity in the construction, severity in the whole, nobility without arrogance, majesty without ostentation."

Aside from its explicit purposes, the complex is also an enormous storehouse of art. In it are displayed masterworks by Titian, Tintoretto, Benvenuto Cellini, El Greco, Velázquez, Rogier van der Weyden, Paolo Veronese, Bernini, Alonso Cano, José de Ribera, Claudio Coello, and others. Giambattista Castello designed the main staircase. The library contains thousands of priceless manuscripts: for example, the collection of the sultan Zidan Abu Maali, who ruled Morocco from 1603 to 1627, is housed here.

== Royal Monastery ==
=== Courtyard of the Kings ===
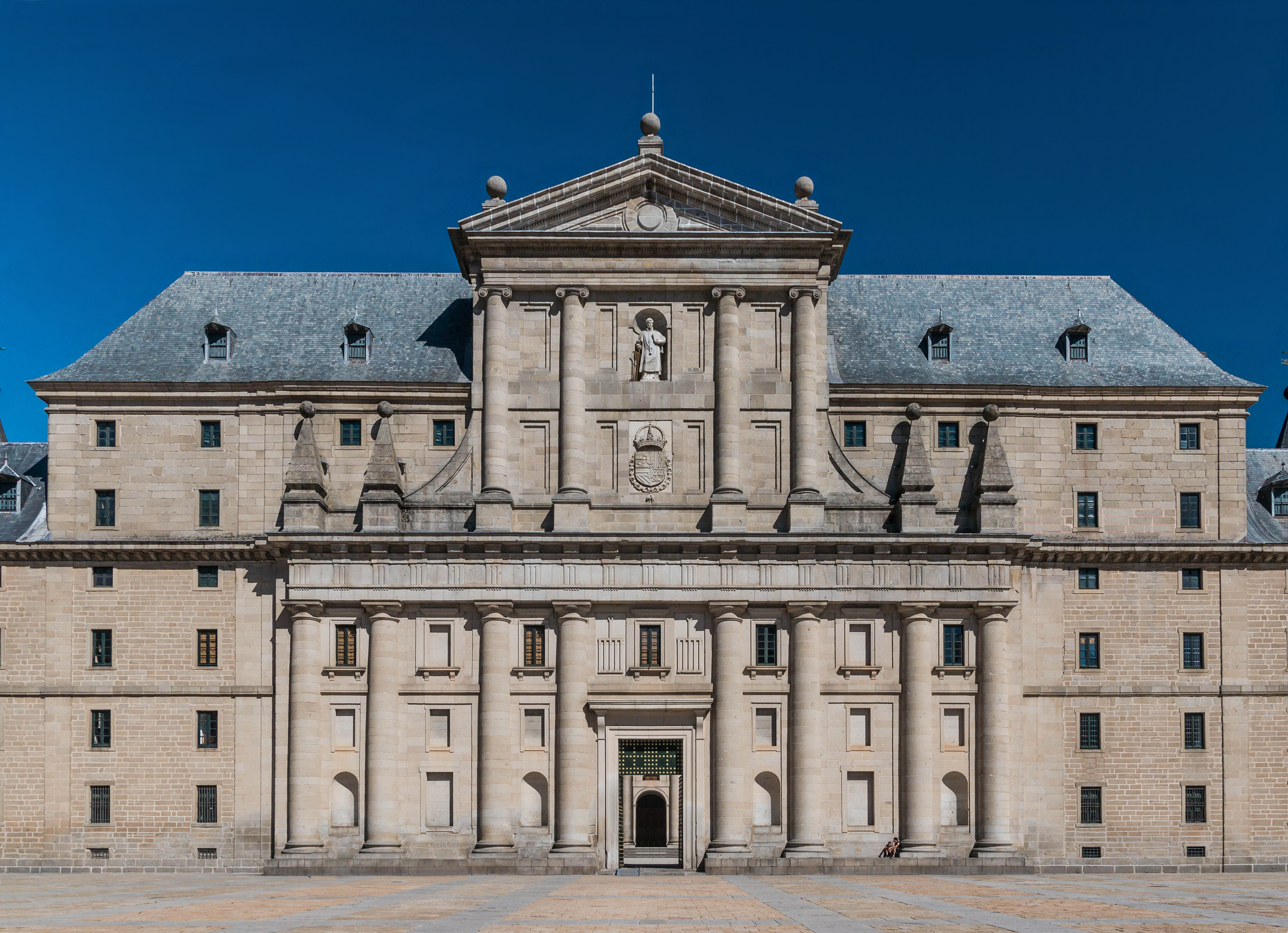
West façade of the monastery

The main entrance of the El Escorial is the west façade, which has three doors: the middle one leads to the Courtyard of the Kings (Patio de los Reyes) and the side ones lead to a school and to a monastery. Above the center door is a niche where the image of Saint Lawrence has been placed. The Courtyard of the Kings owes its name to the statues of the kings of Judah that adorn the façade of the basilica, located at the east end of the courtyard. Steps of red marble lead to the large, public chapel, past the narthex, which is one of the highlights of the basilica. The basilica has a floor in the shape of a Greek cross and an enormous dome, inspired by St. Peter's Basilica in Rome, above the crossing. The naves are covered over by barrel vaults decorated with frescoes by Luca Giordano. The main altarpiece is 30 metres (98 ft) high and divided into compartments of different sizes where are found bronze sculptures, and canvases by Pellegrino Tibaldi, Federico Zuccari, and Leone Leoni. In the sacristy, paintings such as Joseph's Coat by Velázquez, The Last Supper by Titian, and The Adoration of the Sacred Host by Charles II by Claudio Coello are on exhibit.

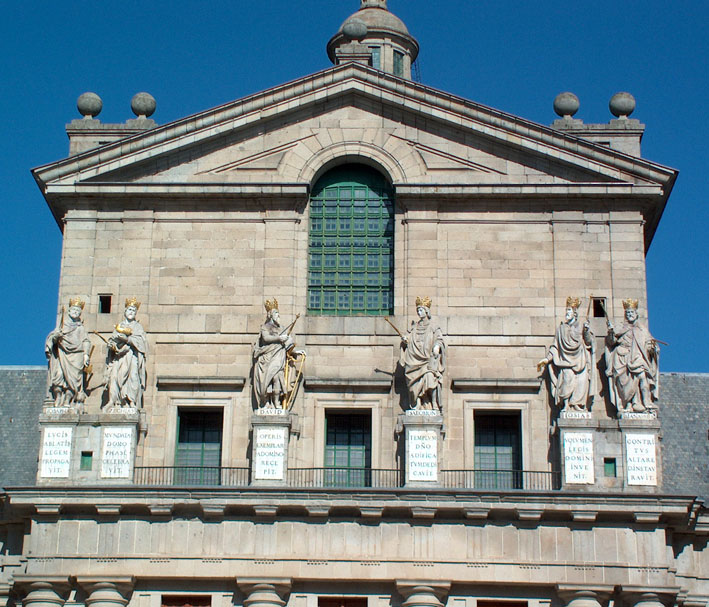
Detail of the Courtyard of the Kings

Under the royal chapel of the Basilica is the Royal Pantheon crypt. This is the place of burial for the kings of Spain. It is an octagonal Baroque mausoleum made of marble where all of the Spanish monarchs since Charles I have been buried, with the exception of Philip V, Ferdinand VI, and Amadeus of Savoy. The remains of the Count of Barcelona, the father of King Juan Carlos I of Spain, also rest in this pantheon despite the fact that the Count never became king himself. The enclosure is presided over by an altar of veined marble, and the sarcophagi are bronze and marble. There is also the Pantheon of the Princes, where the bodies of the queens who did not have a crowned succession and the princes and princesses were laid to rest. This part was built in the nineteenth century.

Next to the basilica, to the south, is the Courtyard of the Evangelists. This is a gardened patio in whose center rises a magnificent pavilion, by Juan de Herrera, in which one can find sculptures of the Evangelists. Around the courtyard are the galleries of the main cloister, decorated with frescoes by Tibaldi and his workshop, in which scenes from the history of the Redemption are represented. In the East gallery, one finds the splendid main staircase with a fresco-decorated vaulted ceiling depicting The glory of the Spanish monarchy, painted by Luca Giordano in 1692.

The Palace of the Austrians (Palacio de los Austrias), also known as the House of the King (Casa del Rey), is found behind the presbytery of the basilica. The outbuildings of this palace, of Italian style, are distributed around the Courtyard of the Fountainheads (Patio de los Mascarones). Inside the House of the King are the Sala de las Batallas (Hall of Battles), which contains frescoes of the battles of San Quintín and Higueruela, among others. The next building contains the rooms of Philip II and of the Infanta Isabella Clara Eugenia. Another outbuilding is that of Alcoba del Rey, housing the bed in which Philip II died.

=== Basilica ===
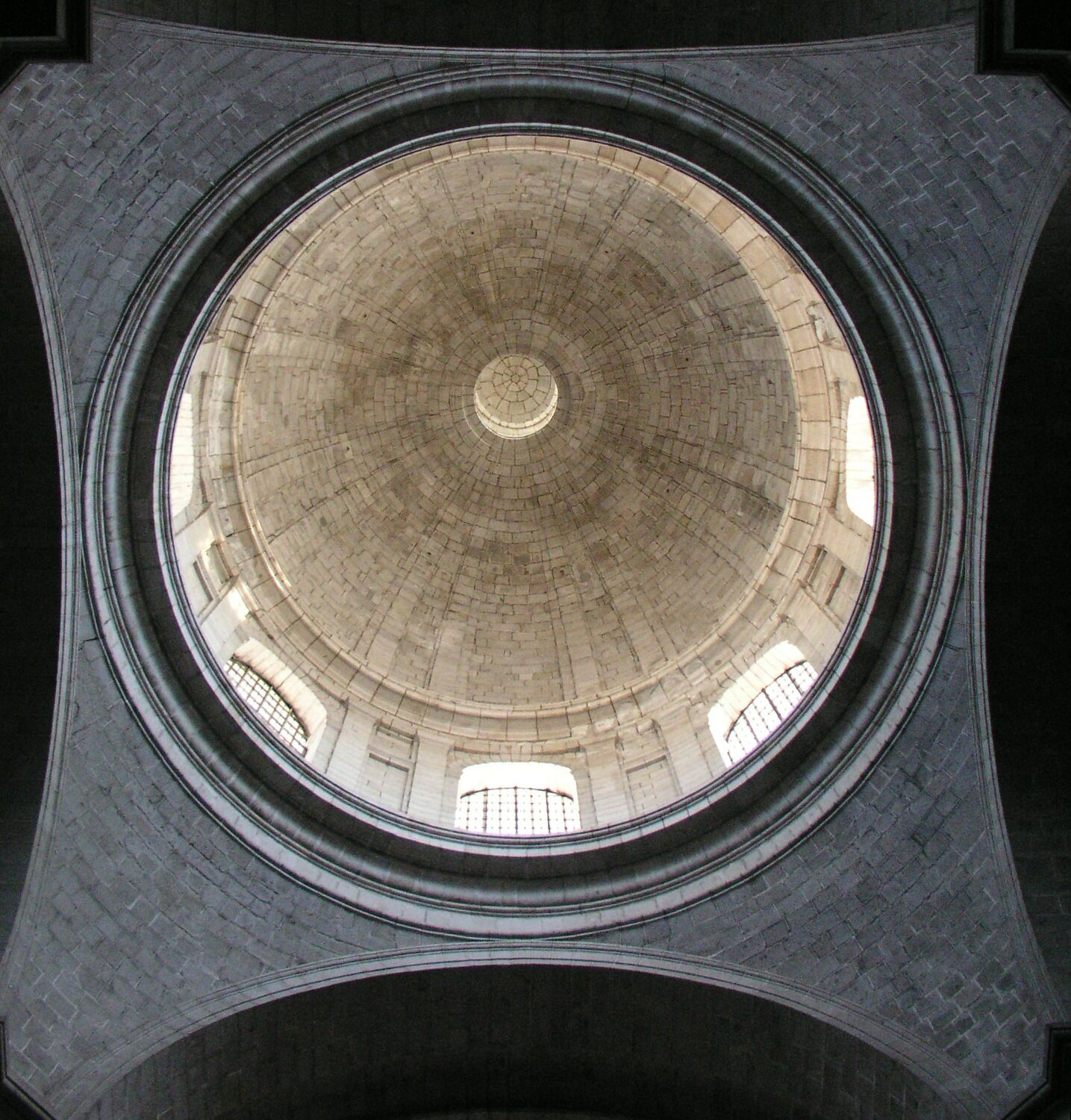
Dome of the Basilica of El Escorial

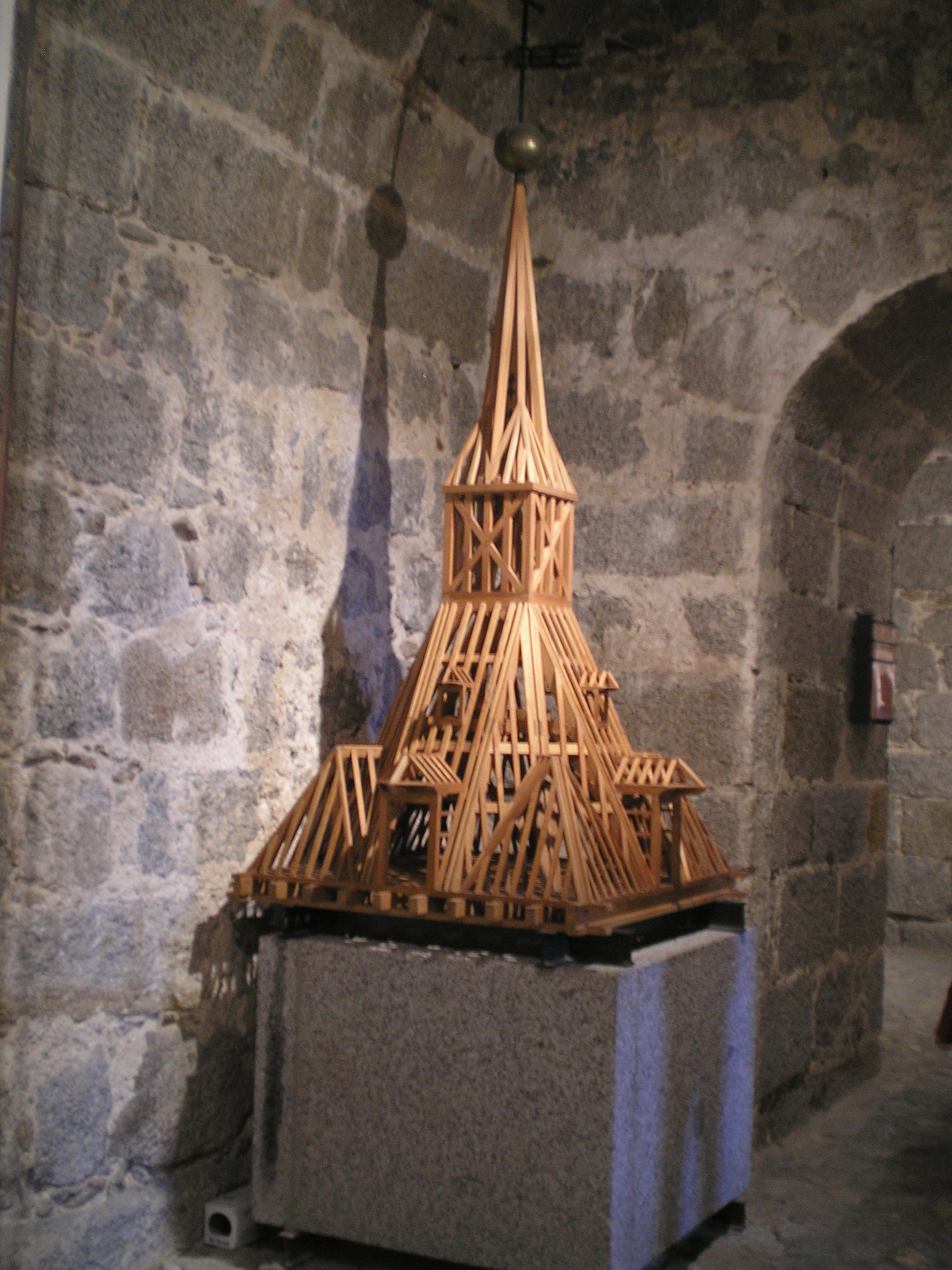
Wooden model of the roof

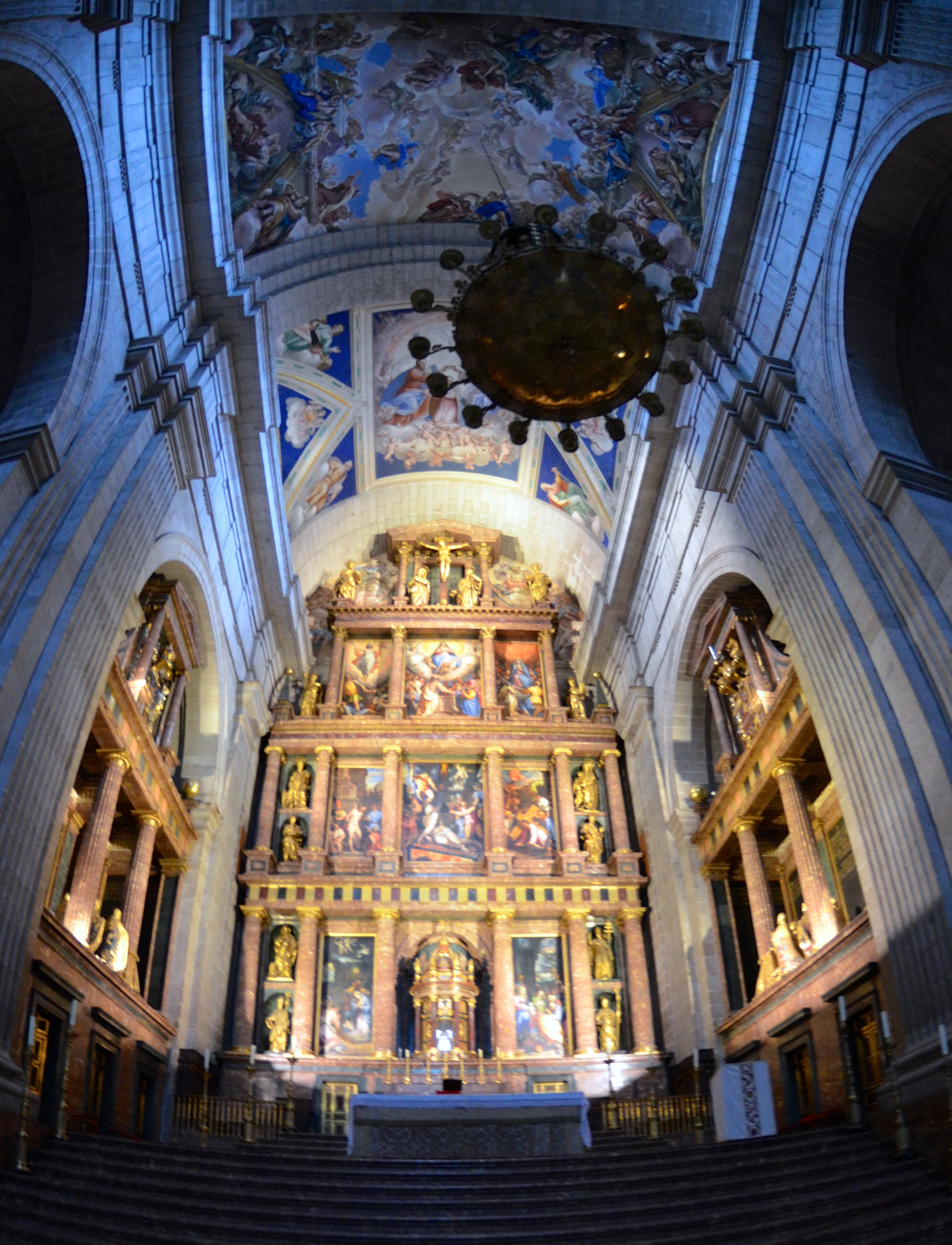
High altar of the Basilica

The basilica of San Lorenzo el Real, the central building in the El Escorial complex, was originally designed, like most of the late Gothic cathedrals of Western Europe, to take the form of a Latin cross. As such, it has a long nave on the east–west axis intersected by a shorter transept, about three-quarters of the way between the west entrance and the high altar. This plan was modified by Juan de Herrera to that of a Greek cross, a form with all four arms of equal length. Coincident with this shift in approach, the bell towers at the western end of the church were somewhat reduced in size and the small half-dome intended to stand over the altar was replaced with a full circular dome over the center of the church, where the four arms of the Greek cross meet.

Clearly Juan Bautista de Toledo's experience with the dome of St. Peter's Basilica in Rome influenced the design of El Escorial's basilica. However, the Roman dome is supported by ranks of tapered Corinthian columns, with their extravagant capitals of acanthus leaves and their elaborately fluted shafts, while the dome at El Escorial, soaring nearly 100 metres (330 ft) into the air, is supported by four heavy granite piers connected by simple Romanesque arches and decorated by simple Doric pilasters, plain, solid, and largely unprepossessing. It would not be a flight of fancy to interpret St. Peter's as the quintessential expression of Baroque sensuality and the basilica at El Escorial as a statement of the stark rigidity and grim purposefulness of the Inquisition, the two sides of the Counter-Reformation.

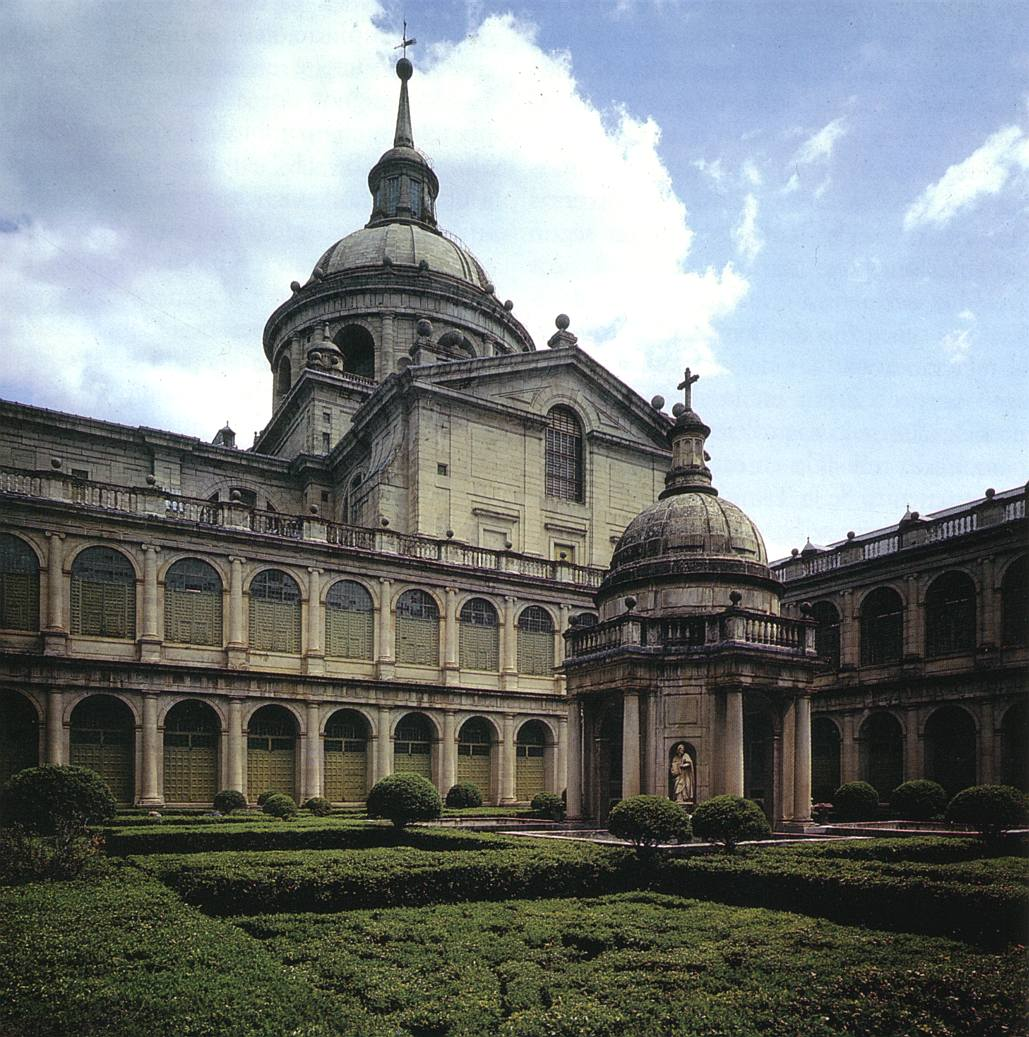
Courtyard of the Evangelists

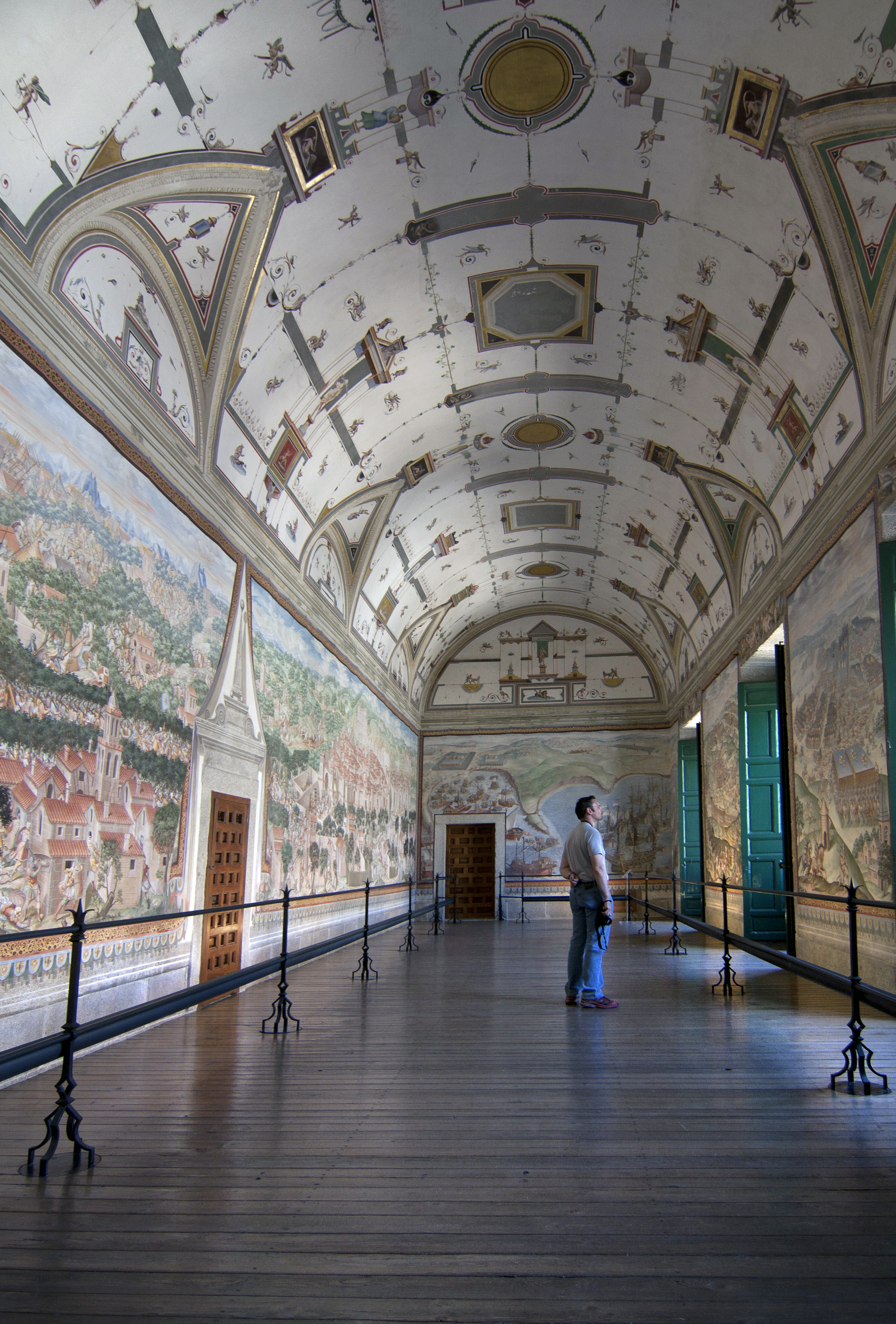
Wall in the Hall of Battles

The most richly decorated part of the church is the area surrounding the high altar. Behind the altar is a three-tiered reredos, or altar screen, made of red granite and jasper, nearly 28 metres (92 ft) tall, adorned with gilded bronze statuary by Leone Leoni, and three sets of religious paintings commissioned by Philip II. To either side are gilded life-size bronzes of the kneeling family groups of Charles and Philip, also by Leoni, with help from his son Pompeo. In a shallow niche at the center of the lowest level is the tabernacle, a repository for the physical elements of the communion ceremony, a so-called "House of the Sacrament", designed by Juan de Herrera in jasper and bronze. It was built between 1579 and 1586 by Jacopo da Trezzo.

To decorate the reredos, the King's preferences had been Michelangelo or Titian, but both of these giants were already more than eighty years old and in frail health. Consequently, Philip consulted his foreign ambassadors for recommendations, and the result was a lengthy parade of the lesser European artists of that time, all swanning through the construction site at El Escorial seeking the King's favor.

One chapel exhibits the famous Crucifix carved in white marble by Benvenuto Cellini. This statue of Christ is unusual because it was represented fully nude; although for modesty it wears one cloth covering the genitals.

=== Palace of Philip II ===
Situated next to the main altar of the Basilica, the residence of King Philip II consists of a series of austerely decorated rooms. It features a window from which the king could observe mass from his bed when incapacitated by the gout that afflicted him.

=== Hall of Battles ===
The gallery was originally called the King's Gallery (Galería del Rey) but came to be known as the Hall of Battles (Sala de Batallas) for its fresco paintings depicting the most important Spanish military victories. These include a medieval victory over the Moors, as well as several of Philip's campaigns against the French.

=== Royal burial vaults ===
==== Pantheon of the Kings ====
This chamber consists of twenty-six marble sepulchres containing the remains of the kings and queens regnant (the only queen regnant since Philip II being Isabella II) of the Habsburg and Bourbon dynasties, from Charles I to the present, except for Philip V and his son Ferdinand VI.

The sepulchres also contain the remains of royal consorts who were parents of monarchs. The only king consort is Francis of Asis de Bourbon, husband of Queen Isabella II and father of Alfonso XII. The most recent monarch interred in the pantheon is King Alfonso XIII, removed there from the Church of Santa Maria in Monserrato, Rome in 1980. The remains of Alfonso XIII's wife, Victoria Eugenie of Battenberg were interred in the pantheon in 2011.

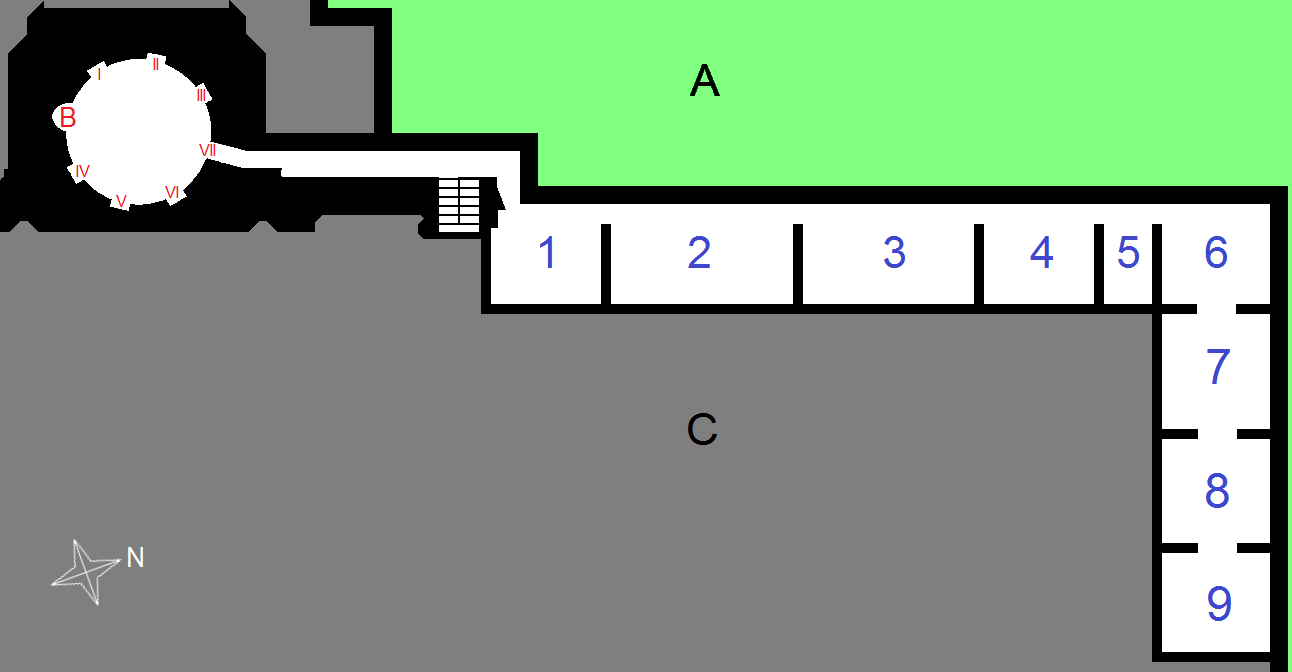
Royal burial vaults in the Monastery of San Lorenzo de El Escorial: I, II, III, IV, V, VI, VII - burial niches in Pantheon of the Kings; 1, 2, 3, 4, 5, 6, 7, 8, 9 - burial chapels in Pantheon of the Infantes; A - garden of the Monastery; B - altar in Pantheon of the Kings; C - basement of the Monastery

The remains of Alfonso XIII's third son Infante Juan, Count of Barcelona, (d. 1993) and daughter-in-law Princess María de las Mercedes of Bourbon-Two Sicilies (d. 2000); (the father and mother of King Juan Carlos I), lie at a prepared place called a pudridero, or decaying chamber, awaiting interment in the Pantheon of the Kings. With the interment of these remains, all the sepulchres in the pantheon will be filled. No decision has yet been announced as to the final resting place of now-abdicated Juan Carlos, Queen Sofía, Felipe VI, Queen Letizia, and any future monarchs and consorts.

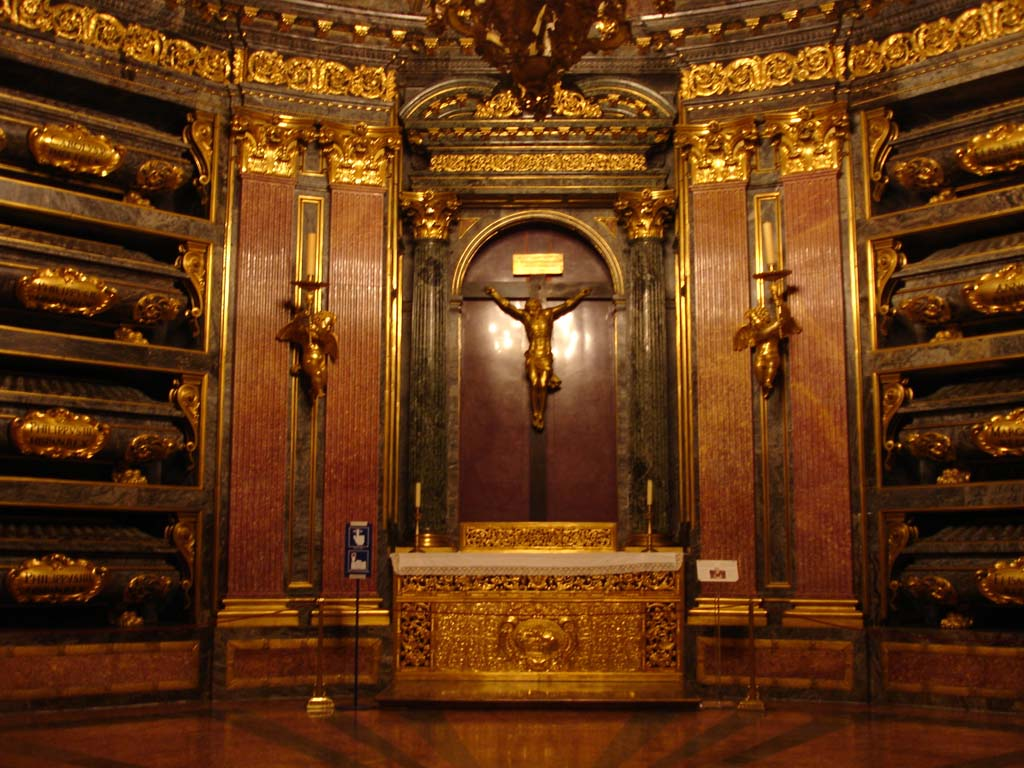
Pantheon of the Kings

There are two pudrideros at El Escorial, one for the Pantheon of the Kings and the other for the Pantheon of the Princes. These can only be visited by monks from the Monastery. In these rooms, the remains of the deceased are placed in a small leaden urn, which in turn will be placed in the marble sepulchres of the appropriate pantheon after the passage of fifty years, the estimated time necessary for the complete decomposition of the bodies.

The interment of the remains of Queen Victoria Eugenie and the Count and Countess of Barcelona in the Royal Pantheon will each constitute an exception to tradition. First, Victoria Eugenie, although the wife of a king, was never the mother of a king in the strict sense. Secondly, the Count of Barcelona never reigned as king, although he was head of the Spanish royal family between the renunciation of his father's rights on 14 January 1941 and his renunciation of his own rights in favour of his son Juan Carlos I on 14 May 1977. Thirdly, the Countess of Barcelona was the mother of a king but not the wife of a king. However, some consider the Count of Barcelona to have been de jure king of Spain from 1941 to 1977, which in turn would make him, his mother, Queen Victoria Eugenie, and his wife, the Countess of Barcelona, eligible for interment in the Pantheon of Kings.

There has already been one exception to tradition: Elisabeth of Bourbon is for the moment the only queen in the pantheon who has not been mother to a king. That is because her only son, the presumed heir to the throne, died after her but before he could become king. But she was the great-grandmother of Philip V (by her daughter Maria Theresa of Spain) and she is an ancestor of the king of Spain.

The walls of polished Toledo marble are ornamented in gold-plated bronze. All of the wood used in El Escorial comes from the ancient forests of Sagua La Grande, on the so-called Golden Coast of Cuba.

==== Pantheon of the Princes ====
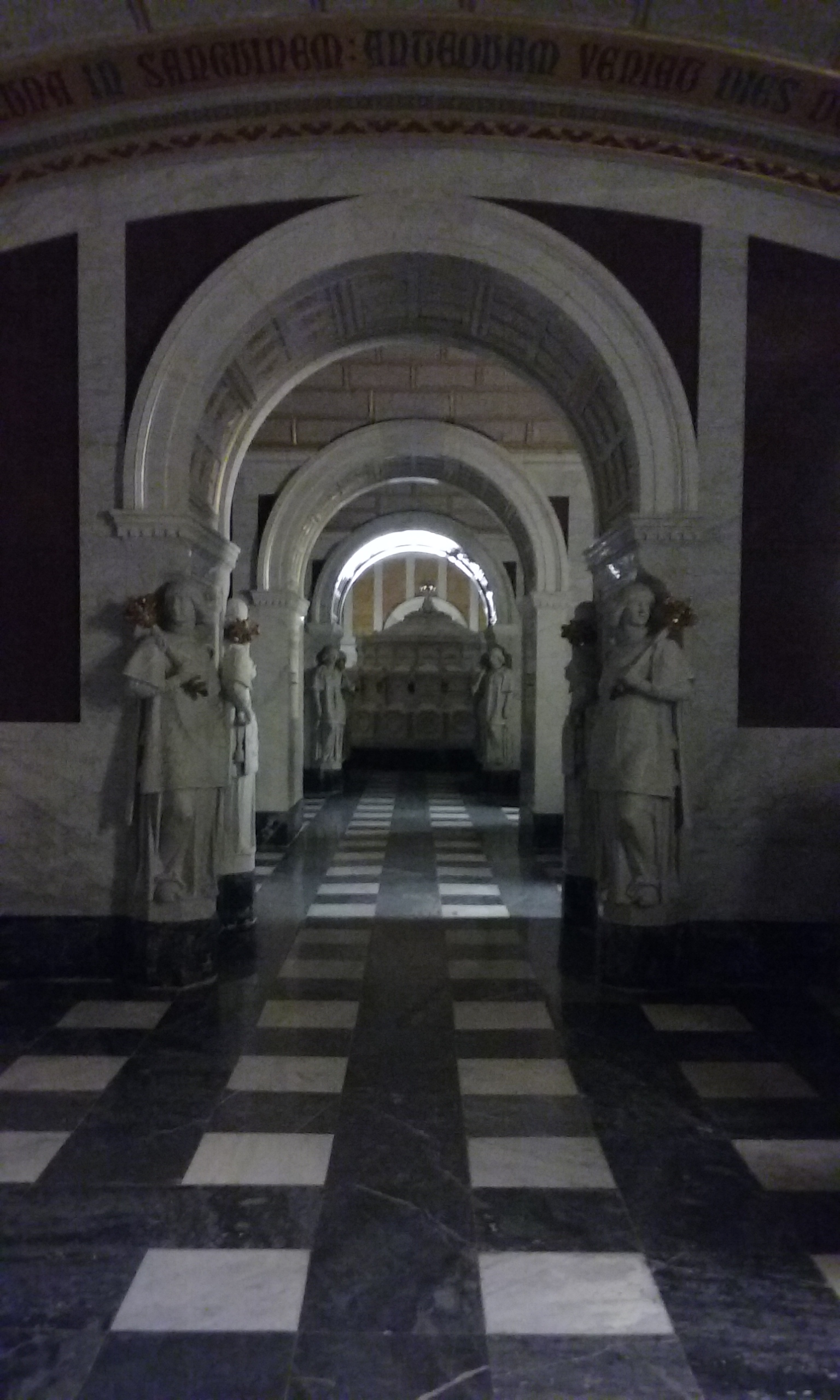
Pantheon of the Princes

The pantheon's name in Spanish is Panteón de Infantes. Completed in 1888, this group of nine burial chapels is the final resting place of princes, princesses, and consorts other than the parents of monarchs. With floors and ceiling of white marble, the tomb of Prince John of Austria is especially notable.

Among the more recent interments is that of Infante Alfonso in October 1992. The younger brother of King Juan Carlos I, he was buried originally in Portugal, after being killed in a still-mysterious 1956 shooting at the family home in Estoril, aged 14.

In 1994, King Juan Carlos I signed a decree raising his cousin and close personal friend Carlos, Duke of Calabria to the status of a Spanish infante, making him eligible for interment in the Pantheon of the Princes. Upon his death in October 2015, his funeral was held at El Escorial and his body placed in the pudridero, awaiting future interment in the pantheon.

Thirty-seven of the sixty available niches are filled.

=== Art gallery ===
Contains works of the German, Flemish, Venetian, Lombard, Ligurian, Italian and Spanish schools from the fifteenth, sixteenth, and seventeenth centuries. The painting gallery was closed in 2015, and subject to a major revitalisation from 2024.

=== Architectural museum ===
Its eleven rooms showcase the tools, cranes and other materials used in the construction of the edifice, as well as reproductions of blueprints and documents related to the project. The architecture gallery, which had been dormant, was subject to a major revitalisation from 2024.

=== Gardens of the Friars ===
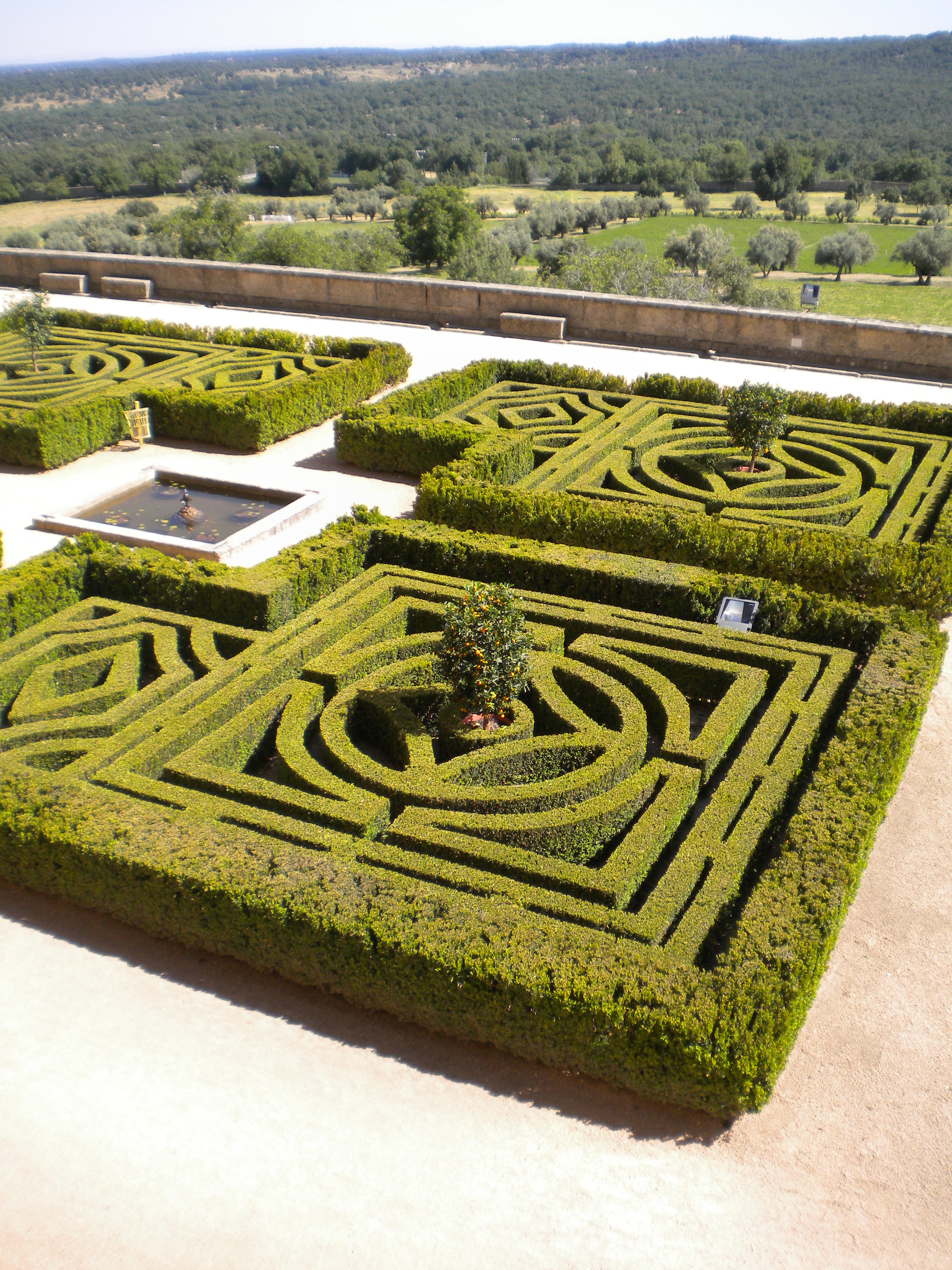
Portion of the formal gardens (Gardens of the Friars) adjacent to north façade of the monastery

Constructed at the order of Philip II, a great lover of nature, these constitute an ideal place for repose and meditation. Manuel Azaña, the Socialist who served as the last president of the Second Spanish Republic, studied in the monastery's Augustinian-run school and mentions them in his Memorias (Memoirs) and his play El jardín de los frailes (The Garden of the Friars). Students at the school still use it today to study and pass the time.

=== Library ===
The Escorial has three libraries. One is located behind the Chorus of the basilica. Another, within the monastery itself, used to be distributed to the different cells and rooms of the monks and that the Augustine monks have gradually managed to make their own. Finally, the Royal Library, which is public and exists under a special papal bull of protection.

From the beginning, the Royal Library was meant to be a monumental work of art, and its execution was commissioned to prominent architects of the moment: Juan de Toledo and Juan de Herrera, who shared the King's neoplatonic views and who also designed the library's shelves. It constituted, along with the basilica, the heart of the entire project, and the project was redrafted several times to accommodate changes in the organization of the library itself. As was usual for Juan de Herrera's work, it was the most advanced of its kind in Europe. It was the first library on the continent that broke with medieval design. Domenico Fontana was inspired by Herrera's design, after a visit, for his design of the Vatican Library. Philip was involved in every part of the design process of the library.

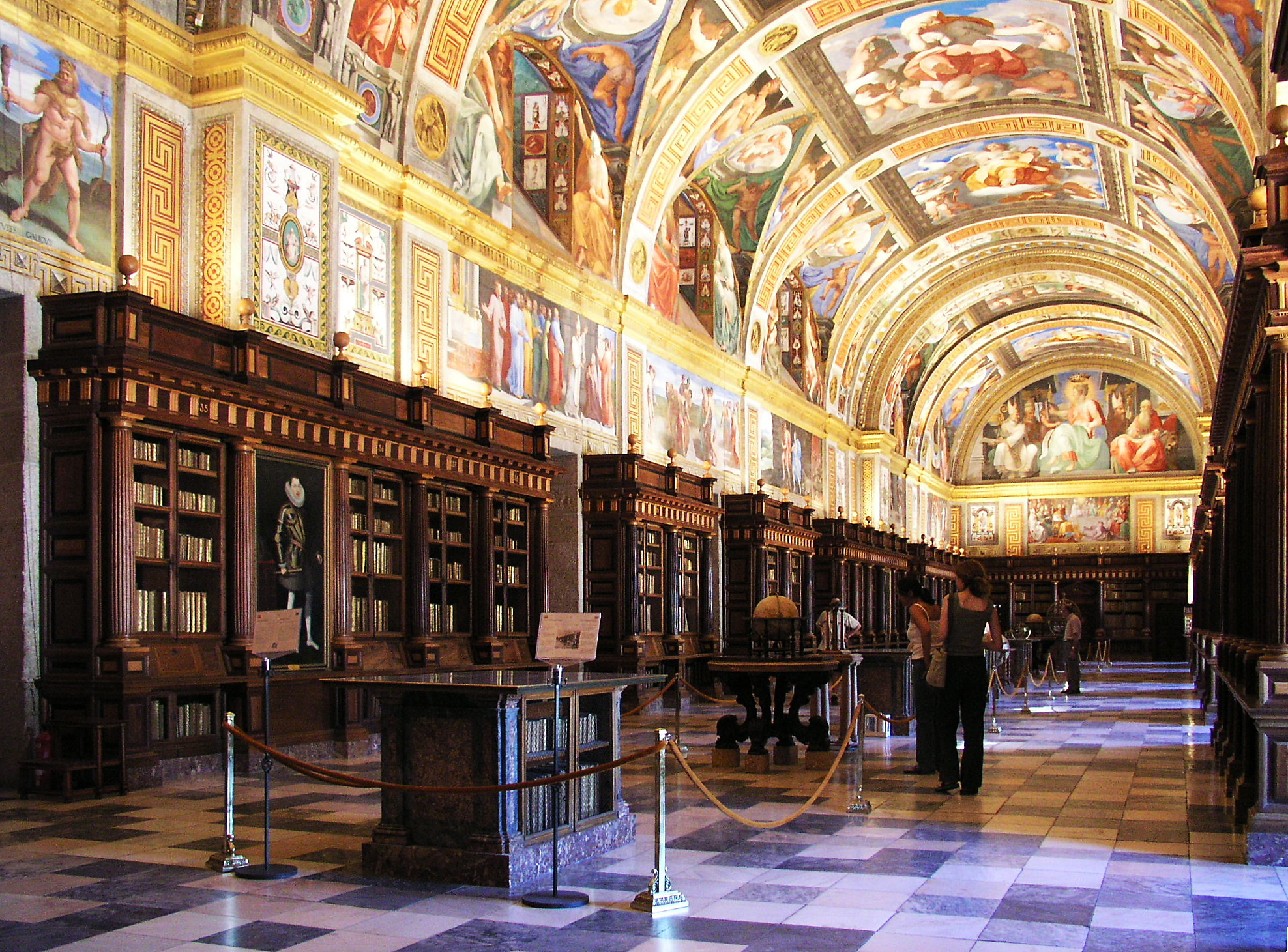
The library of El Escorial.

The Royal Library, like everything else in El Escorial, forms part of a larger symbolic structure and has symbolic meaning. It links the monastery and the seminary across the principal axis of the building, symbolizing the union of the spiritual and physical world. The books on the profane subjects—such as history, geography, and botany—are located in the part closest to the entrance. The library corridors branch out into different sections just to re-converge in the end, and as they advance towards the basilica, the subjects are the more abstract forms—such as poetry, grammar, and mathematics. The subjects closest to the basilica are those the King conceived as being the most abstract distillations of the others, and the closest to the origin, which was God in the Basilica: theology, geometry, and mathematics. The visitor must leave the noisy world behind and walk through the halls of knowledge in a specific, comprehensible order from concreteness to abstraction before being able to reach God and understand His message, a notion quite in line with both Charles I and Philip II's hermeticist view of religion.

During Philip II's reign, the library introduced a novel way of arranging the library's bookcases or "book presses". Until then most book presses were combined with desks and stood at right angles to the library's walls. This system was known as the "stall system" and allowed light from the library's windows to illuminate the shelves. Phillip's library began using a "wall system", placing the bookcases along the walls.

Currently the library has more than 40,000 volumes, located in a great hall 54 metres (177 ft) in length, 9 metres (30 ft) wide, and 10 metres (33 ft) tall, with marble floors and carved wood shelves for aesthetics. De Herrera and Italian construction engineer Giuseppe Flecha y Gamboa were careful to consider the security of the library's holdings in armarios (large bookcases), as well as their display, safeguards against fire hazards, and use of available natural lighting. This library was designed for both the preservation of the old (binding multiple cultural histories into a single Catholic Spanish culture) and discovery of the new (imprinted by that culture).

The vault of the library's ceiling is decorated with frescoes, painted by Pellegrino Tibaldi, depicting the seven liberal arts: grammar, rhetoric, dialectic, music, arithmetic, geometry, and astronomy. This arrangement of parallel book cases was initiated by Philip II and was called the "wall system".

The fire of 1671, which engulfed the library, destroyed about 5,280 handwritten codices, but the printed collections were saved. The printed collection of the library is made up of more than 600 incunabula, 10,608 books from the 16th century, 2,179 books from the 17th century, and an increasing number of books from the 18th century. The manuscript collection is made up of a few thousands of medieval codices.

==== Collecting process ====
Philip II donated his personal collection of documents to the building, and also undertook the acquisition of the finest libraries and works of Western European Humanism. During Phillip's reign, there was an entire room dedicated to ancient manuscripts, most of them in Latin, many in Greek, but also some in Hebrew, Aramaic, Arabic, Italian, French, and Spanish. There were approximately 1,800 Arabic titles. The first of those books were acquired in 1571 through Juan Paez de Castro. After that many books were obtained as a "peace price" during the many battles of the Spanish Empire with the Ottoman Empire. As part of his active efforts, in 1571 Philip II bought a large portion of the collection of Gonzalo Pérez, one of his advisors. This meant 57 original Greek manuscripts from Sicily, and 112 Latin ones, from Calabria. He also bought 315 original volumes, in Greek and Arabic, from Juan Páez de Castro's personal library. The King charged specific ambassadors with traveling through his empire and neighboring kingdoms searching and buying the best for El Escorial's library. These ambassadors were coordinated by the head librarian, who had total authority to direct their movements, and who stayed in contact with them through all their travels. Diego Guzmán de Silva was one such ambassador and made one of the most important purchases for the library during his time in Venice: an ancient collection of Greek manuscripts and Latin codices (1569–1577).

An inventory prepared in 1576 counted 4,546 volumes, over 2,000 manuscripts, and 2,500 printed books. That same year the library of Diego Hurtado de Mendoza, the most valuable in Spain at the time, was bought. It included 850 codices and over 1,000 printed volumes. At this point, the size of the library was such that Benito Arias Montano had to be specially hired to organize the books and classify them by language, in addition to subject. In the 1580s the Library acquired some of its most unique pieces. Jorge Beteta donated a manuscript of the Concilios visigóticos (the Visigothic Councils) from the ninth century. Philip acquired several books from the Library of Granada, that belonged to Isabella I of Castile, including her Libro de Horas of astonishing visual beauty. Other valuable libraries acquired by Philip were those of Pedro Fajardo, and of Antonio Agustín, one of the largest in Spain at the time. About a thousand of these books are still in El Escorial, with many others having been sent to the Vatican. The King actively purchased rare books—often on esoteric, scientific, or theological subjects—from the East. He also collected and preserved over four hundred books prohibited by the Inquisition, which he agreed should not be available for those likely to "misunderstand" them but only to experts. By 1602, the library had a large cartographic collection and over 150 mathematical instruments. Philip II left in his will a pension for the Escorial Library, to ensure that it would still be able to acquire new volumes.

Philip III continued his father's policy of protection and enrichment of the library, even though he was not theologically inclined. In addition to continuing the search for, and purchase of, especially valuable and old books, he promulgated a new decree, according to which the library of El Escorial was to receive a copy of every book published inside the empire. During his reign the orders of continuing to search for books for the library were still in place. Arias Montano donated a large number of original Hebrew manuscripts, and Admiral Luis Fajardo brought back the complete Zaydani library captured during his wars with Sultan Muley Zidán.

The library reached its peak under Philip IV. In 1671 a great fire destroyed 5280 codices; the main hall, in which the printed books were kept, was saved. Among the most important losses were the Concilios visigóticos and the Historia natural de las Indias (Natural History of the Indies), a 19-volume encyclopedia on biology and botany by Francisco Hernández de Toledo. After the fire, the priest Antonio de San José spent over 25 years reclassifying and taking inventories of the surviving copies. His list of surviving books counted 45,000. Shortly after, as the Habsburg dynasty came to its end and the Bourbons took the throne after the War of the Spanish Succession, a further loss took place, as the Bourbon kings reversed the trend of acquiring books for the library and instead proceeded to take books to send to France or to their own libraries.

Currently, the library has over 40,000 volumes. The library includes many important illuminated manuscripts, such as the Ottonian Golden Gospels of Henry III (1045–46). The only known copy of the Kitab al-I'tibar, a 12th-century Syrian autobiography, was found there in the 19th century.

=== The reliquaries ===
Following a rule approved by the Council of Trent dealing with the veneration of saints, Philip II donated to the monastery one of the largest reliquaries in all of Catholic Christendom. The collection consists of some 7,500 relics, which are stored in 570 sculpted reliquaries designed by Juan de Herrera, with most being constructed by the artisan Juan de Arphe y Villafañe. These reliquaries are found in highly varied forms (heads, arms, pyramidal cases, coffers, etc.) and are distributed throughout the monastery, with the most important being concentrated in the basilica.

In the basilica, the relics are kept within two altarpieces, with the door panels painted by Federico Zuccari. Within the altarpiece depicting the "Annunciation") are relics of female saints; its companion includes the relics of male saints.

=== Reorganisation ===
In 2024 El Escorial was being reorganised for visitors over two years, funded by €6.5m from the EU. Instead of using a side entrance, visitors enter through the imposing Patio of Kings courtyard. The Patio of the Evangelists, a garden with fountains and statues, will be open to visitors. The painting and architecture galleries, long dormant, are being reopened, reorganised and revitalised. The building is being updated with LED lighting, electric vehicle charging points, and solar panels.

== Adjacent buildings ==
Juan de Herrera also designed the Casas de Oficios (Official Buildings) opposite the monastery's north façade; and his successor, Francisco de Mora, designed the Casa de la Compaña (Company Quarters).

== Gallery ==
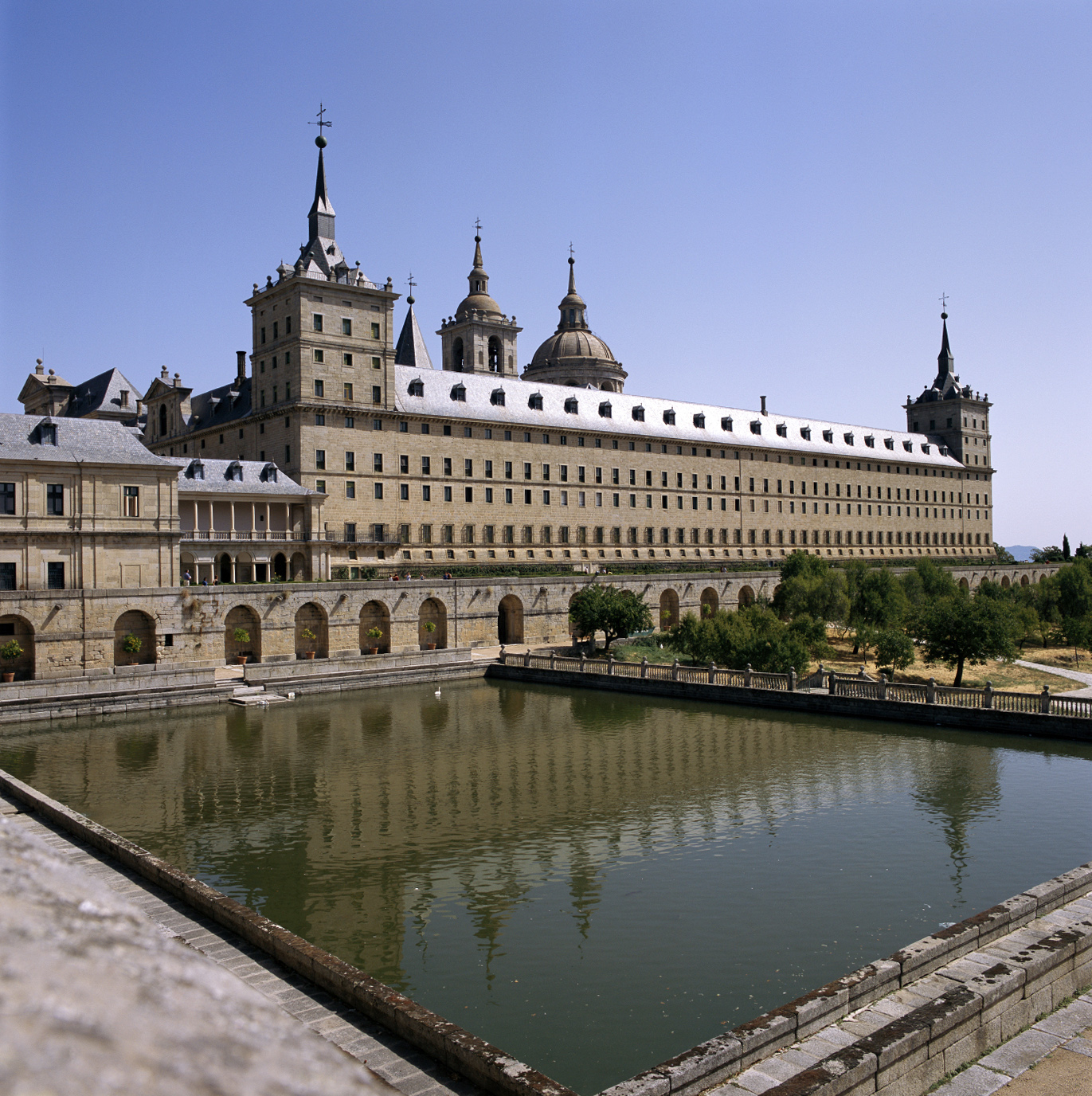
Monastery and its reflection

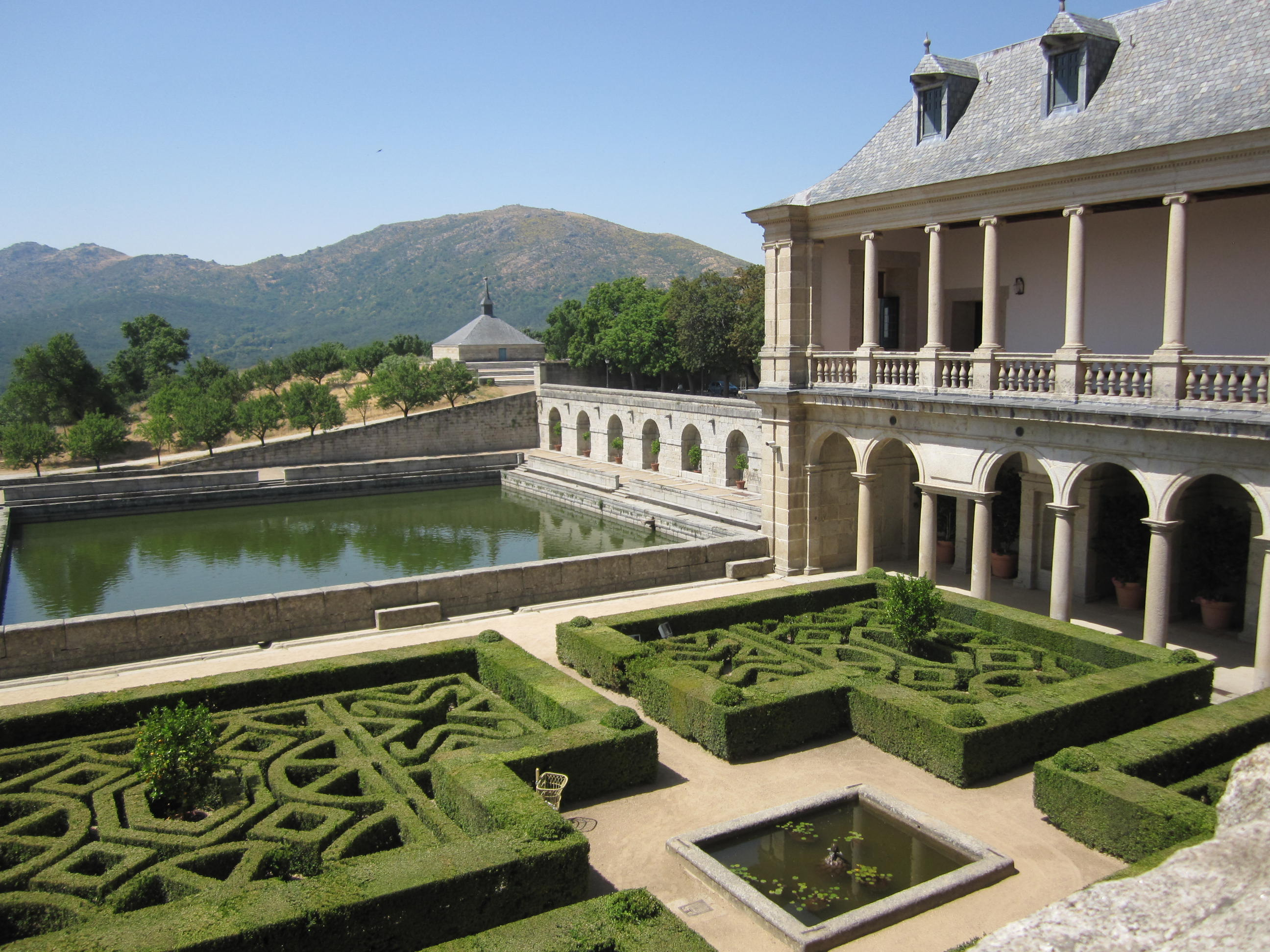
Pool from the Monastery

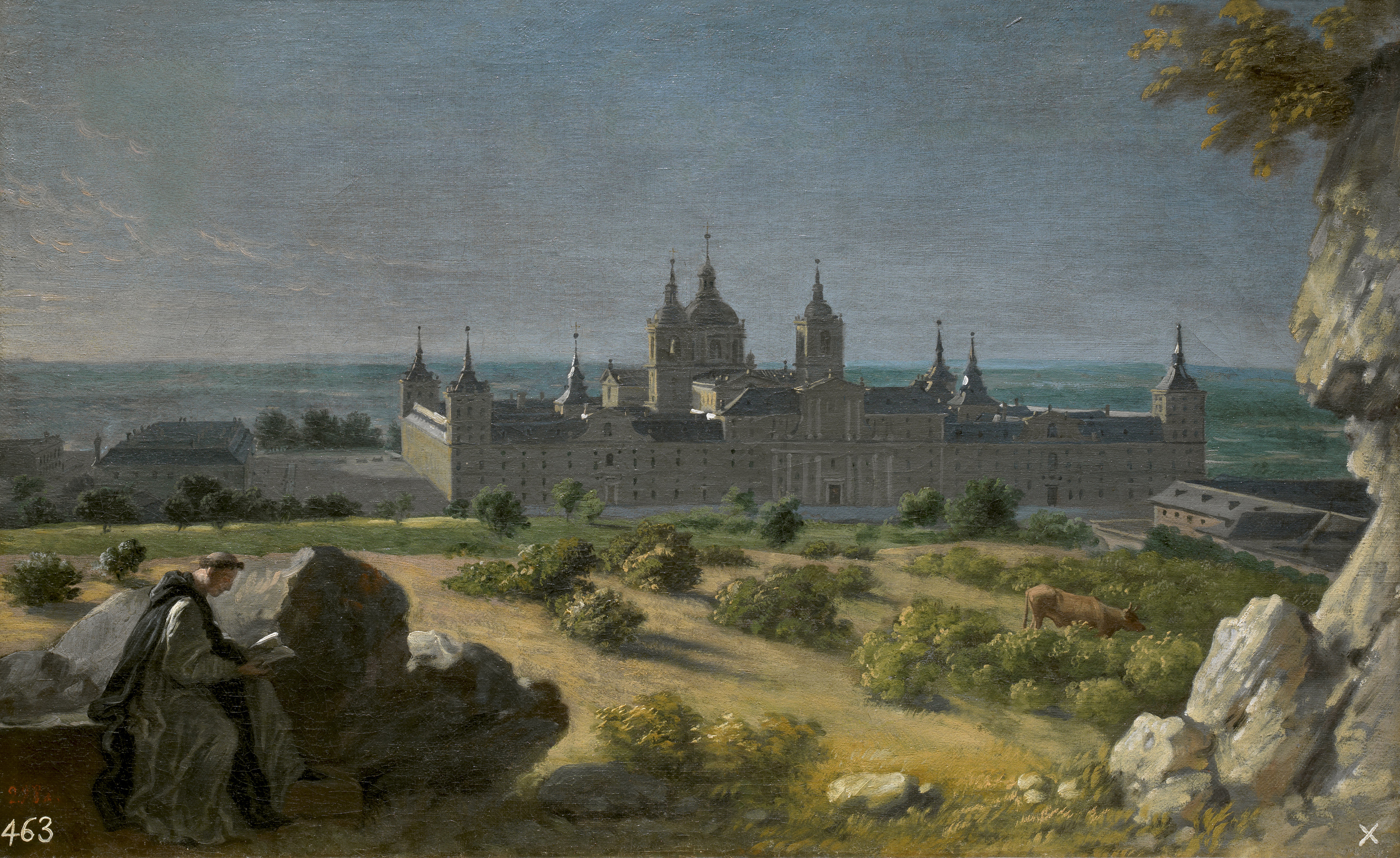
View of El Escorial, by Michel-Ange Houasse (1723)

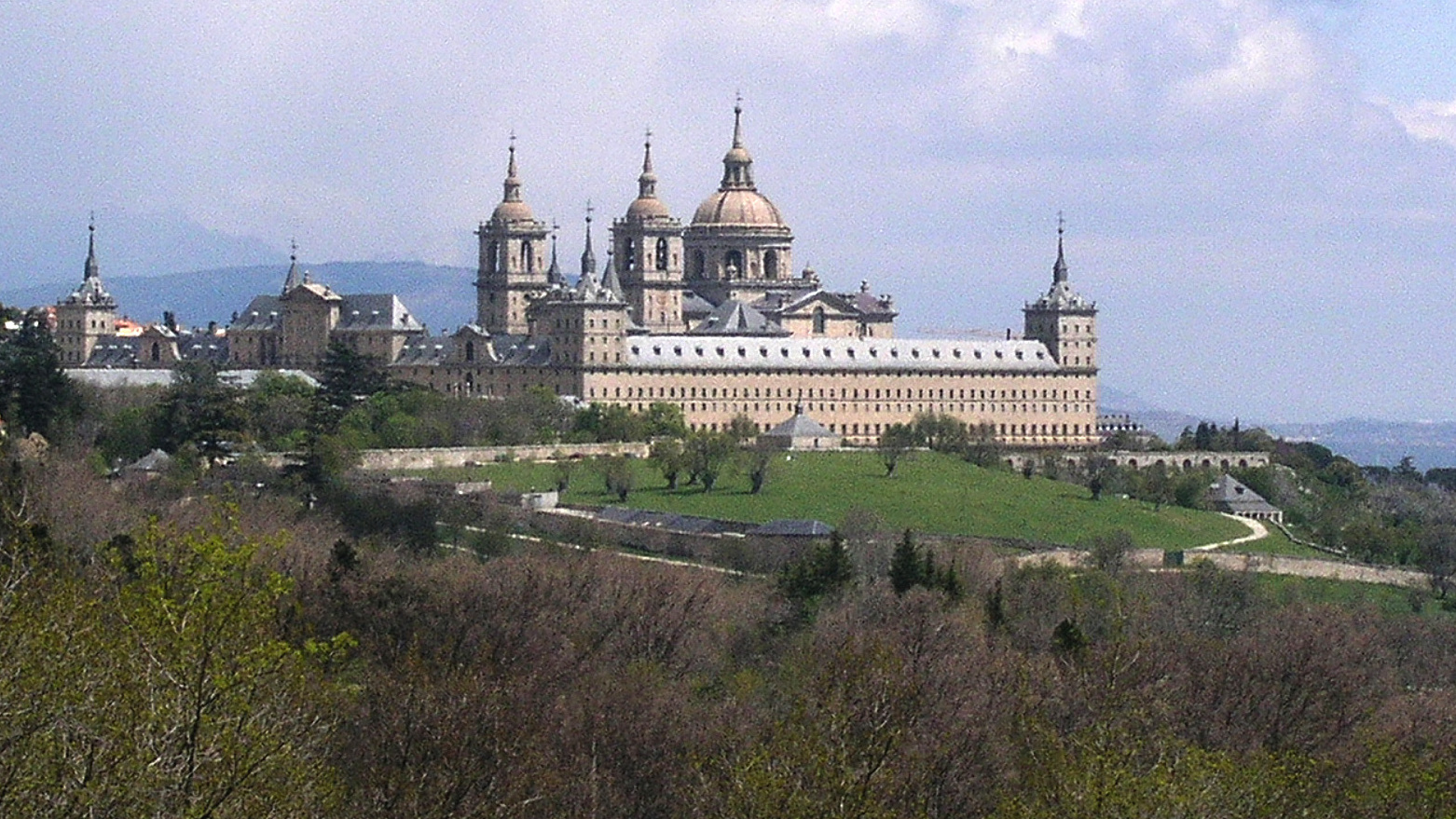
A distant view.

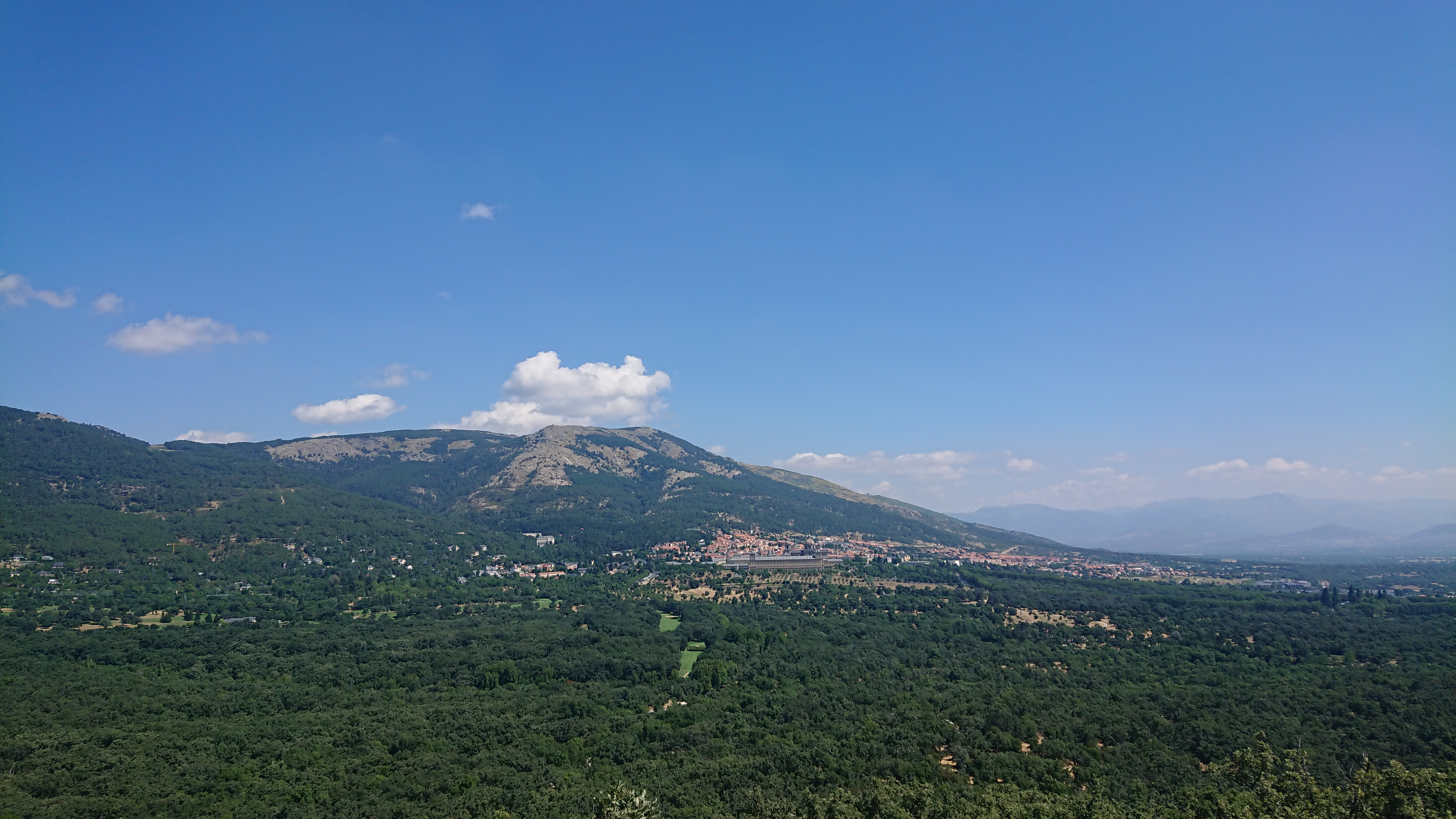
View of El Escorial from the Seat of Philip II

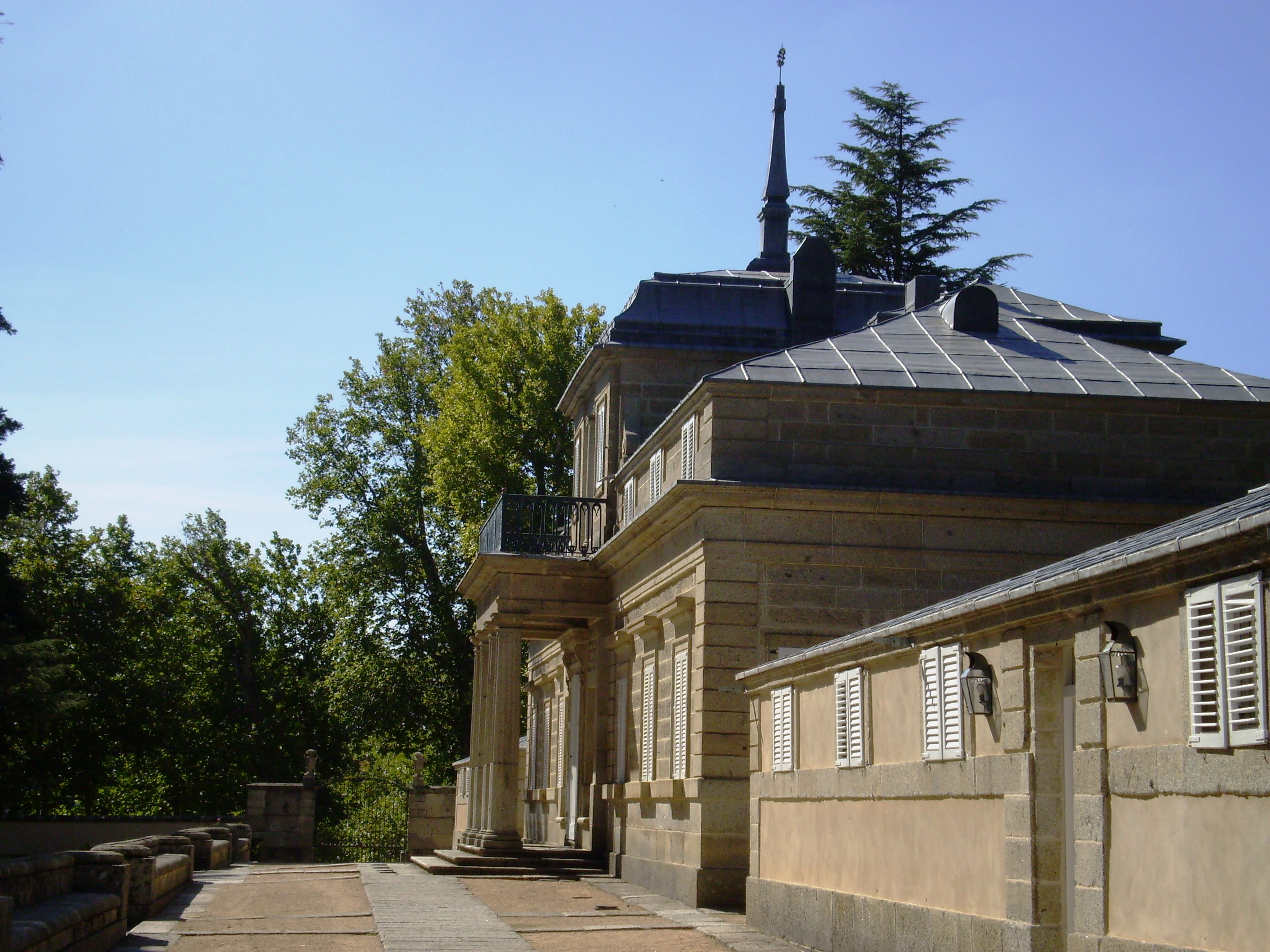
The Casita del Principe, was built in 1771–75 to designs of Juan de Villanueva, for the Prince of the Asturias, the future Charles IV

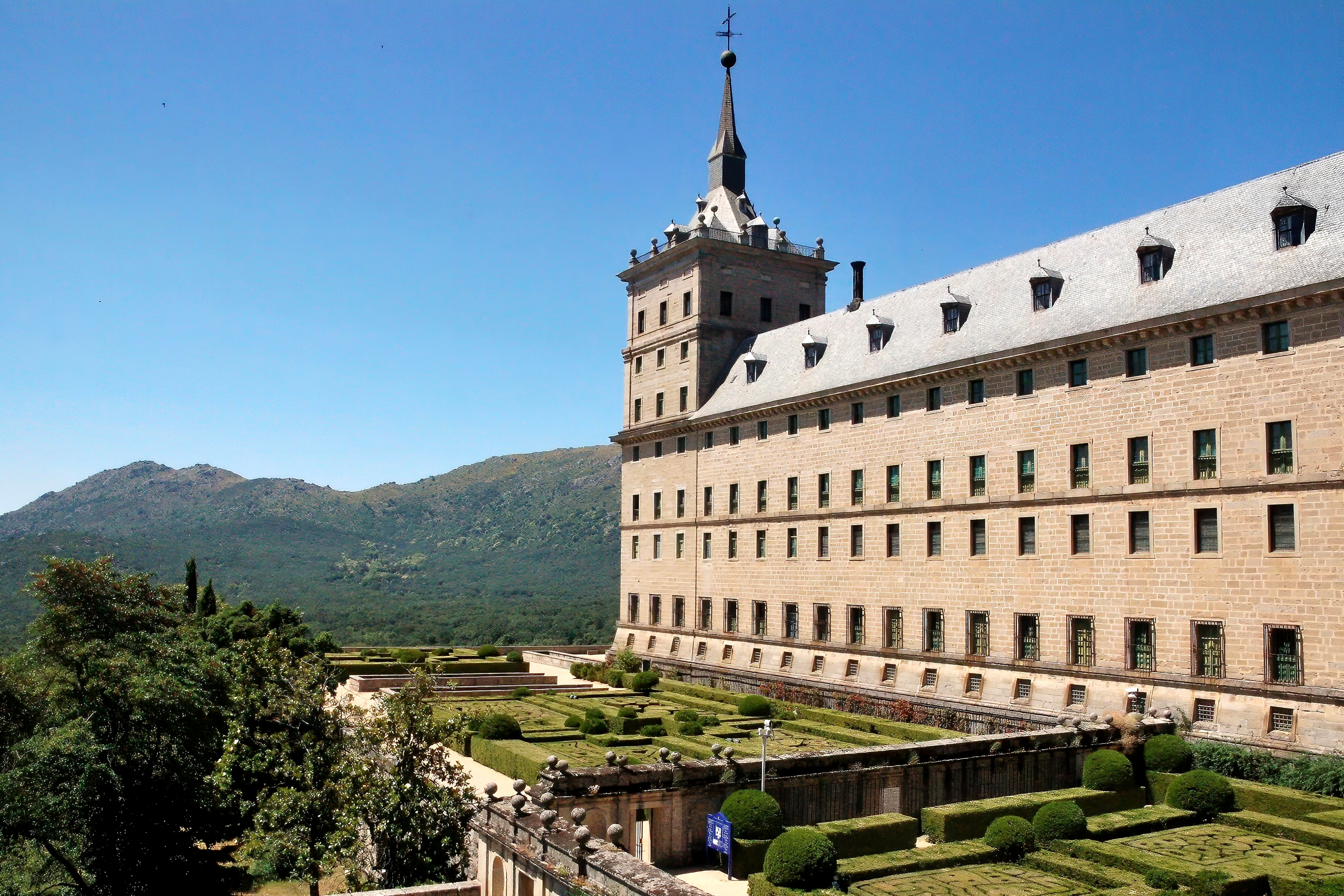
The Monastery with the garden

== See also ==
- 16th-century Western domes
- List of carillons
- Spanish Golden Age
- Valle de los Caídos
- Patrimonio Nacional
- Herrerian style
- Imperial Route of the Community of Madrid
- Symbolism of domes
