= Royal Palace of La Almudaina =

Alcazar palace in Spain

Coordinates: 39.5675°N 2.64722°E

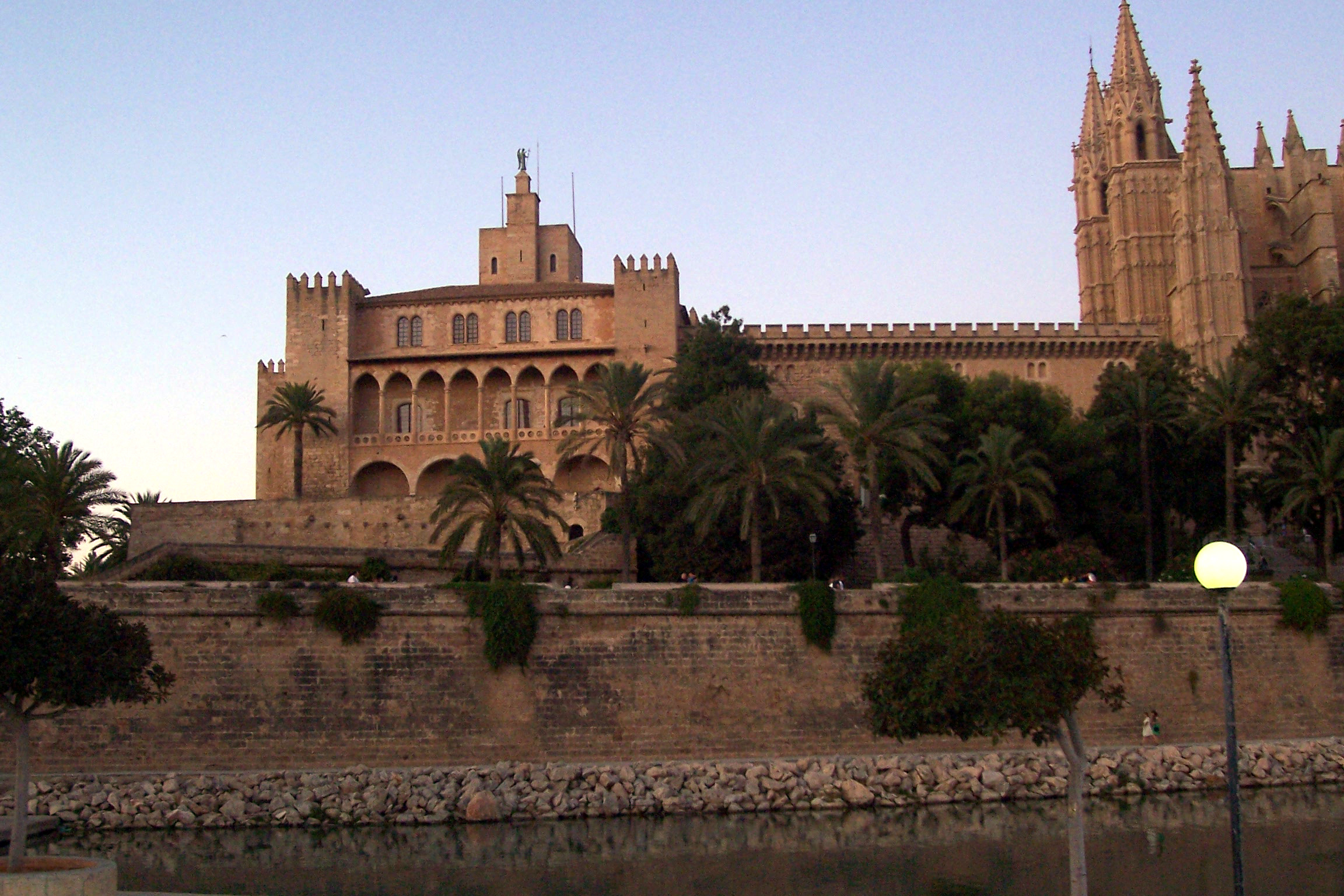
Palacio Real de la Almudaina

The Royal Palace of La Almudaina (Catalan: Palau Reial de l'Almudaina, pronounced [pə'law rə'jal də ləlmu'ðajnə]) is one of the official residences of the Spanish royal family. Originally an Arab fortress, major alterations were made at the beginning of the 14th century. It is located opposite the Palma Cathedral in Palma on the island of Mallorca, Spain.

== History ==
This imposing alcázar was known at the time of the conquest with the name of "Zuda". When King James II of Majorca conquered the kingdom of Majorca, a program was launched in 1298 to reform the appearance of the city. This included rebuilding the alcázar into a royal palace, which started in 1305. Work was carried out between 1309 and 1314, although the idea was conceived before 1300. This included the construction of the Great Hall, the creation of a sculpture of the Archangel St Gabriel and the founding of St Anne's Chapel. In La Almudaina, the monarchs of the Kingdom of Majorca, the Aragonese monarchs and Spanish monarchs had their court successively. Philip II of Spain destined the "Tinell" to Real Audiencia and installed in the rest of the building the General Captaincy of the Islands.

The current structure of La Almudaina corresponds to the one built in the 14th century with its different spaces; the palaces of the King and of the Queen, the chapel of Saint Anne or the baths, are the most outstanding.

Its decoration presents two environments, on the ground floor the medieval style is recreated with works from the 15th to the 20th centuries. The upper floor, used for the celebration of official acts of the royal family, is decorated with objects and furniture from other Royal Sites of the 17th, 18th and 19th centuries.

The current castle, of Roman origin, is a modification of the Muslim alcázar begun in 1281, it lasted until 1343, during the reigns of James II of Majorca, Sancho of Majorca and James III of Majorca. La Almudaina was the seat of the prosperous Majorcan kingdom of 14th century, until passing to the Crown of Aragon with Peter IV in 1349.

During the first half of 16th century the upper floor was built by order of Charles V, Holy Roman Emperor.

In the same way as in the Royal Palace of Madrid, the Royal Palace of La Almudaina, is the official summer residence of the King, as well as other members of the Spanish royal family, who also reside in the Palace of Marivent and in the Palacio de la Zarzuela in Madrid.
