= Zucchi =

Zucchi is an Italian surname, and may refer to:

- Ángel Zucchi (born c. 1924), Argentine hockey player
- Antonio Zucchi (1726–1795), Italian painter
- Augusto Zucchi (born 1946), Italian actor and theatre director
- Carlo Zucchi (general) (1777–1863), Italian general and patriot
- Carlo Zucchi (1789–1849), Italian architect
- Dino Zucchi (1927–2011), Italian basketball player
- Francesco Zucchi (1692–1764), Italian engraver
- Franco Zucchi (rower) (born 1965), Italian Olympic rower)
- Franco Zucchi (sailor) (born 1917), Italian Olympic sailor
- Giovanni Zucchi (1931–2021), Italian rower
- Giuseppe Zucchi (1721–1805), Italian engraver
- Jacopo Zucchi (1541–1590), Florentine painter
- Niccolò Zucchi (1586–1670), Italian Jesuit astronomer and physicist
- Roby Zucchi (born 1951), Italian water-skier noted for slalom
- Thaila Zucchi (born 1981), Italian-English singer and actress
- Virginia Zucchi (1849–1933), Italian ballerina
