= Carlo Zucchi =

Carlo Zucchi may refer to:

- Carlo Zucchi (printmaker) (1682–1767), Venetian architect and printmaker
- Carlo Zucchi (general) (1777–1863), Italian general
- Carlo Zucchi (architect) (1789–1849), Italian architect
