= Silvestro Manaigo =

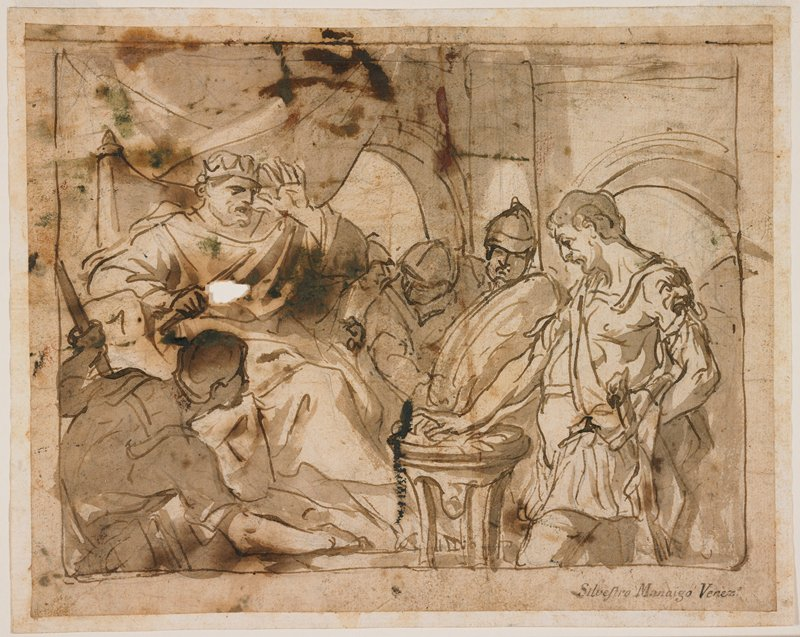
Gaius Mucius Scaevola

Silvestro Manaigo (1666/1670, Venice? - 1750, Venice?) was an Italian painter, designer and miniaturist. His name is occasionally seen as "Menaico".

== Biography ==
He studied painting with Gregorio Lazzarini, later becoming active as a miniaturist and designer. None of his miniatures have survived, but precise information about them is recorded in the guide to Venice by Vincenzo Coronelli which was later amended by Pietro Guarienti. They are also noted in the Abecedario Pittorico (1753) by Pellegrino Antonio Orlandi.

His activity as a designer of models, to be reproduced in engravings for printing, is preserved in numerous etching illustrations that have survived. There are only a small number of paintings that have been unquestionably identified as his.

One of the earliest so verified is a portrait of Saint Matthew (1722); part of a series of apostolic portraits, by various artists, at the Church of San Stae. Its late Baroque style shows the influence of Lazzarini.

Another precisely documented work is the "Martyrdom of Saint James" (1742), painted for the presbytery of Bergamo Cathedral. The crowded figures give a hint as to what his miniature style may have looked like.

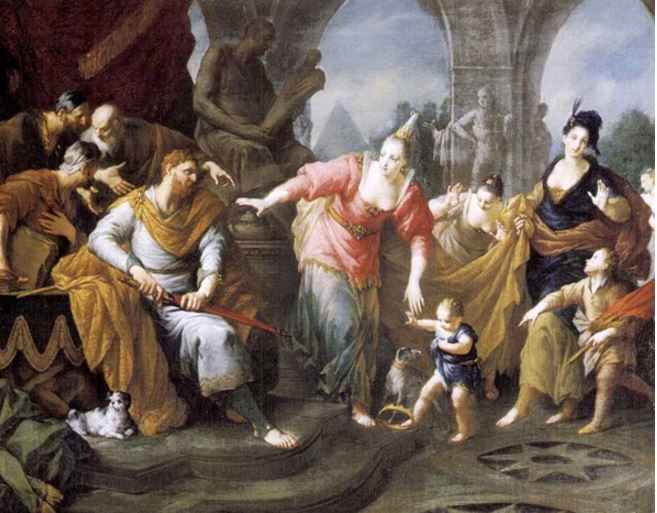
Moses Tramples on Pharaoh's Crown

Overall, the small number of his works mentioned in the historical literature seems to indicate that most of his output was for private clients. As such, they would have become dispersed and impossible to trace.
