= Royal Palace of Aranjuez =

Royal palace of Spain

- Palacio Real de Aranjuez
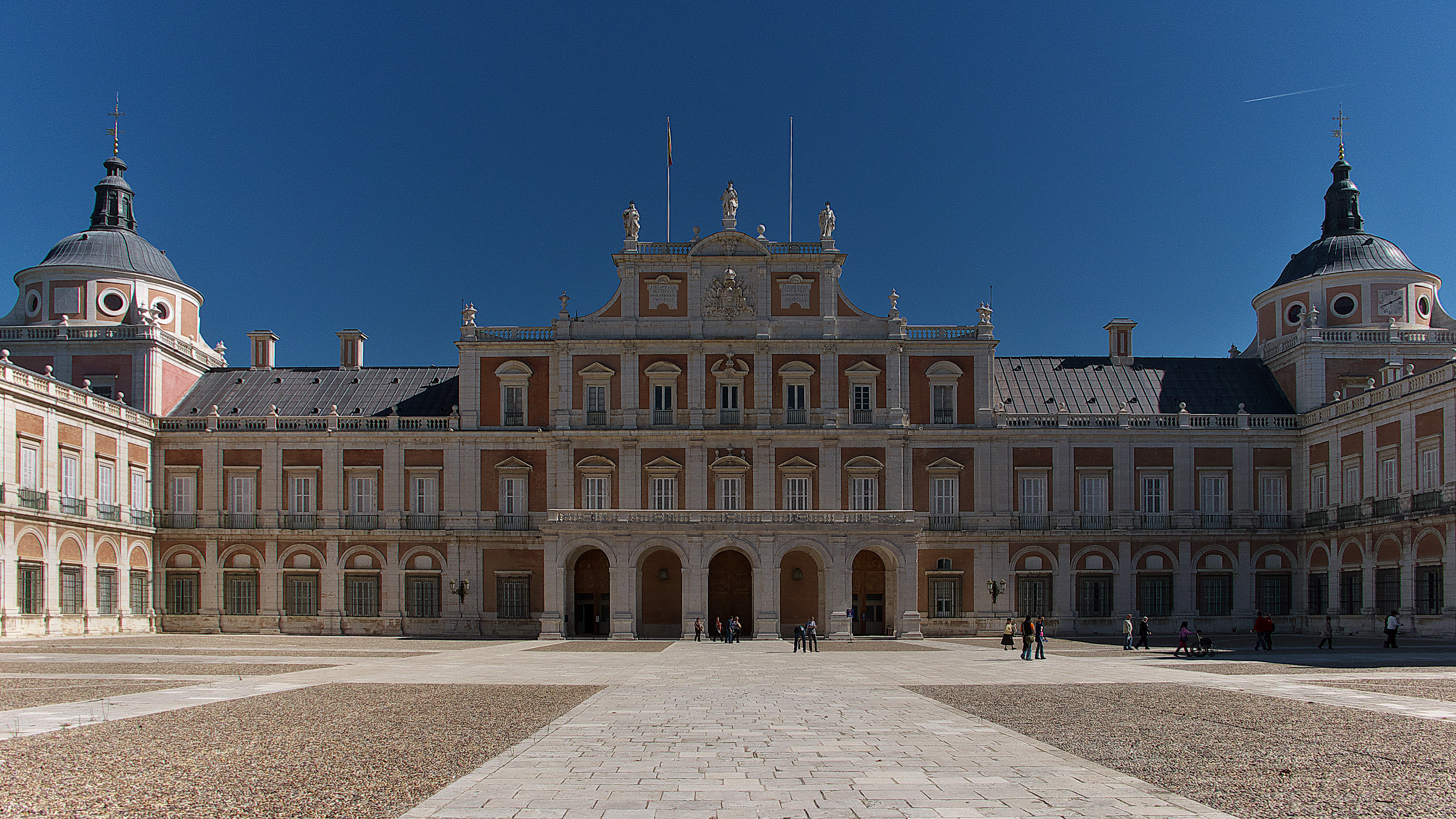

General information
- Architectural style: Renaissance
- Location: Aranjuez (Madrid). Spain
- Coordinates: 40.036383°N 3.608930°W
- Opened: Exclusive property for the monarch: 1523
- Operator: Patrimonio Nacional

Design and construction
- Architects: Juan Bautista de Toledo; Juan de Herrera; Francesco Sabatini; Giuseppe Gricci; Rafael Contreras Muñoz

UNESCO World Heritage Site
- Type: Cultural
- Criteria: ii, iv
- Designated: 2001 (25th session)
- Part of: Aranjuez Cultural Landscape
- Reference no.: 1044
- Region: Europe and North America

Spanish Cultural Heritage
- Official name: Palacio de Aranjuez con sus dependencias
- Type: Non-movable
- Criteria: Monument
- Designated: 3 June 1931
- Reference no.: RI-51-0001063

The Royal Palace of Aranjuez (Spanish: Palacio Real de Aranjuez) is one of the official residences of the Spanish royal family. It is located in the town of Aranjuez (Madrid), Spain. Established in the 16th century as a royal hunting lodge, the palace was built by order of Philip II. Under his reign it became one of four seasonal seats of the court along Rascafría, El Escorial and the Royal Alcázar of Madrid. The royal estate comprises a set of landscaped and ornate gardens and woodlands that house an extensive botanical collection.

Several international treaties were signed there and several members of the royal family died in the palace, including: Elisabeth of Valois (Note: Queen consort as third wife of Philip II.) in 1568, Barbara of Portugal (Note: Queen consort of Ferdinand VI.) in 1758, Elisabeth Farnese (Note: Queen consort and widow of Philip V and Queen regent.) in 1766, Maria Antonia of Naples (Note: Princess of Asturias consort as first wife of Ferdinand VII.) in 1806, Maria Isabel of Braganza (Note: Queen consort as second wife of Ferdinand VII.) in 1818 and Maria Josepha Amalia of Saxony (Note: Queen consort as third wife of Ferdinand VII.) in 1828.

In 1931, during the Second Spanish Republic, the royal estate was declared an Artistic Historical Monument and opened to the public. From 1977 to 1983, the palace served as a state guest house. The palace, gardens and associated buildings are part of the Aranjuez Cultural Landscape, which was declared a UNESCO World Heritage Site in 2001. Currently it houses a museum on the ground floor, the royal rooms and gardens are open to the public and its management is entrusted to the public agency Patrimonio Nacional.

== History ==
In the 12th century the Order of Santiago created an exclusive hunting reserve alongside the river Tagus near its junction with the river Jarama.

Its history as a royal site began in the 16th century, when the order's grandmaster Lorenzo I Suárez de Figueroa directed the construction of a grand hunting lodge designed for the recreation of members of the order and their royal and noble patrons, known as the Raso de Estrella (Star shaped Glade located between the present Royal Palace and Aranjuez railway station.) The site today is an open festival park.

In 1523 Charles I of Spain took possession of the area, which was designated Real Bosque y Casa de Aranjuez (Royal Woods and House of Aranjuez), in order to entertain his guests during the springtime hunting season.

In 1551, he established a botanical garden to catalog the newly catalogued species of plants brought from the Americas. Owing to distractions elsewhere, this mission was not entirely successful.

Philip II became aware of the fertile meadows of Aranjuez, and designated that a portion of land to the north of the river Tagus should be devoted to pottager and general agriculture in 1561.

In an adjacent plot to the south of the river, the King began construction of the first palace, on the same site as the existing building. Philip engaged the services of architect Juan Bautista de Toledo and later Juan de Herrera. They were also responsible for the palace and monastery of El Escorial. The site also included exotic animals such as dromedaries (camellos in the period sources): about 10 in 1583 and about 40 in 1598.

After Philip's death in 1598, the works were still in progress with only the royal apartments, the chapel, the south tower and part of the western facade completed. An economic and political crisis, along with eventual extinction of the Spanish Hapsburg dynasty, resulted in the project being abandoned. Charles Stuart, Prince of Wales visited the palace in 1623 during his trip to Spain for the "Spanish Match".

In 1700, the first Bourbon king of Spain, Philip V, decided to resume the work, intending to make Aranjuez a rival to the grand palace of Versailles. Subsequently, this imposing style would be applied to the Royal Palace of La Granja de San Ildefonso. Philip V added a new north tower, completed the west façade and defined the structure that would shape the current palace. The royal dromedaries were about 200, surviving even the occupation of the palace by the troops of Archduke Charles in 1710. They were not kept in a menagerie as in Versalles, but grazed around or were employed as beasts of burden. Bulls and exotic animals were also used in the royal pastimes, such as dumping them into the Ontígola reservoir to be shot by the royal musket. Little used, the palace was almost destroyed by fire in 1748.

Ferdinand VI rebuilt the palace. Although still respecting the original foundations, the new structure was to reflect the prevailing late baroque style and 18th century aesthetic, of an imposing and ostentatious exterior accommodating a series of sumptuously furnished spaces within. Farinelli directed musical entertainment.

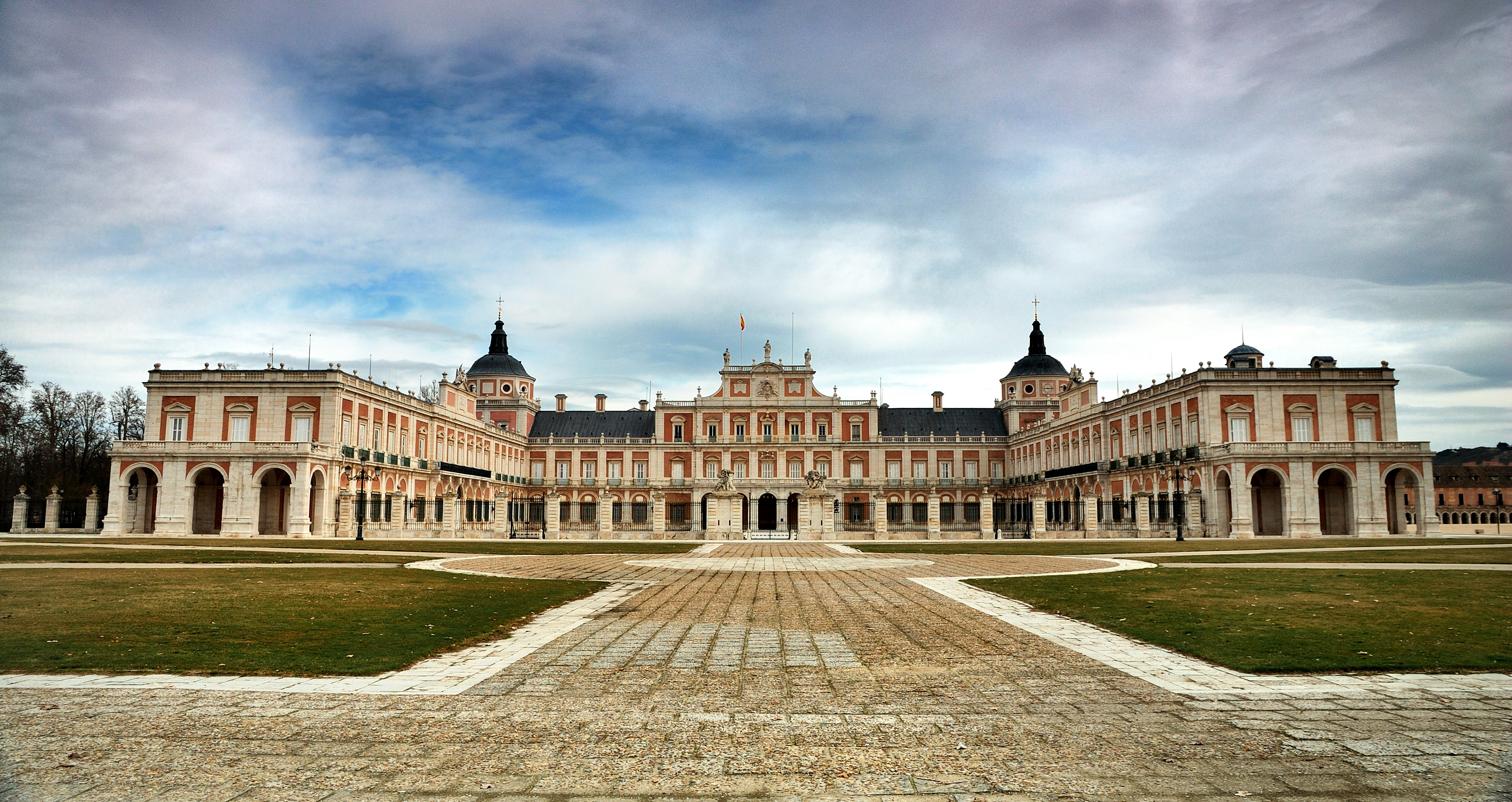
The wings enclosing the courtyard were added in the 18th century.

The building is mainly due to Charles III in his reforming work for the capital city (he is sometimes called the Mayor of Madrid) and modernization of the Spanish state.

The architect of the modern palace was the Italian Francesco Sabatini. He designed the two west wings, which provide the main building enclosing the courtyard, thus defining three sides of the cour d'honneur square that faces the original entrance. It is near the Raso de Estrella at the confluence of the two rivers. At one end of this complex was the chapel and opposite was designated as a theater, although it was never completed.

The decoration was enriched in the 18th and 19th centuries with paintings by various artists; in the halls hardwood furniture and several collections of tapestries, clocks, lamps and sculptures were installed. Many of these unique pieces adorn the halls, chambers and spaces. The Salón de Porcelana was the favorite retreat of Charles III.

Charles III took refuge there from Spanish politics for some time following the Esquilache Riots. He chose Aranjuez to be his spring and summer residence at a period of history when the royal court used to move from Madrid in the spring and did not return to the capital until October.

The King embraced physiocracy (an early form of economics in which the wealth of a nation supposedly lay in its soil and people rather than its treasury). Charles, who enjoyed the palace and its rural environment, established the Cortijo de San Isidro as an experimental farm and divided the palace gardens into the intimate Jardín del Parterre and the wider Jardín de la Isla. He held lavish parties and sometimes sailed along stretches of the Tagus in rich artistically decorated and gilded falúas.

Charles' son, Charles IV and his wife Maria Luisa of Parma erected a pavilion known as the Casa del Labrador (farmhouse), which is today open to the public and an important example of European Neoclassical architecture.

In 1807, Manuel Godoy, favorite of Charles IV's and Spanish prime minister, tried to make peace with Napoleonic France but faced the opposition of the rebellious heir to the throne Ferdinand (later called the "felon king"). Godoy claimed that the kingdom was safe from the impending Napoleonic French invasion because of the treaties he had facilitated. In 1808, while Godoy was a resident in Aranjuez (within the Palace of Osuna) the rumor of invasion spread, resulting in an angry mob led by the rebellious supporters of Ferdinand finding him hiding in an attic. He was taken prisoner and later exiled. As a result of the successful Mutiny of Aranjuez in March of that year the palace Salón del Trono witnessed the abdication of King Charles IV in favor of his son Ferdinand VII, who himself abdicated in May.

In September 1808, in a formal ceremony held in the Chapel of the Royal Palace of Aranjuez before Monsignor Don Juan de la Vera, the Archbishop of Laodicea, the Supreme, central Junta was officially constituted.

After the Bourbon Restoration, Alfonso XII designated the Royal Palace of Aranjuez to be the residence of the noble household of the dukes of Montpensier. His bride to be was the daughter of that family, Mercedes of Orléans. In 1878 the bride and her entourage arrived for the ceremony from Madrid at an imposing but temporary railway station constructed near the grand Plaza de Armas (western) entrance to the Palace of Aranjuez.

This was the last grand event to be held in Aranjuez, as Maria Christina of Austria the monarch's second wife, his son Alfonso XIII and his wife Victoria Eugenie of Battenberg all preferred the Palacio de la Magdalena and Miramar Palace for their royal holidays.

== Design ==
The palace is the centerpiece set of a royal estate. To the north are former potager gardens, now agricultural land intersected by geometric tree-lined "royal rides" which are now open to the public and mostly pedestrian walkways. To the east are a trident of paved roads (Reina, Principe & Infantas) along which the nobility erected family residences. To the west are a matching trident of rural tracks, one of which was the royal access road lined by barracks (now ruined).

Furthest from the palace is an open area, the Raso de Estrella, the site of the original hunting lodge and now a festival ground. The original railway station was also here, before it was relocated further west of the current site. Some of the former railway sidings – now a car park for commuters – are also still discernible. Directly in front of the palace is the oval lawn surrounded by monumental stone benches. The tourist mini-train stop is near there. To the south is the Plaza de Parejas, an open sandy area surrounded by various palace dependencies described below.

=== Plaza de Parejas ===
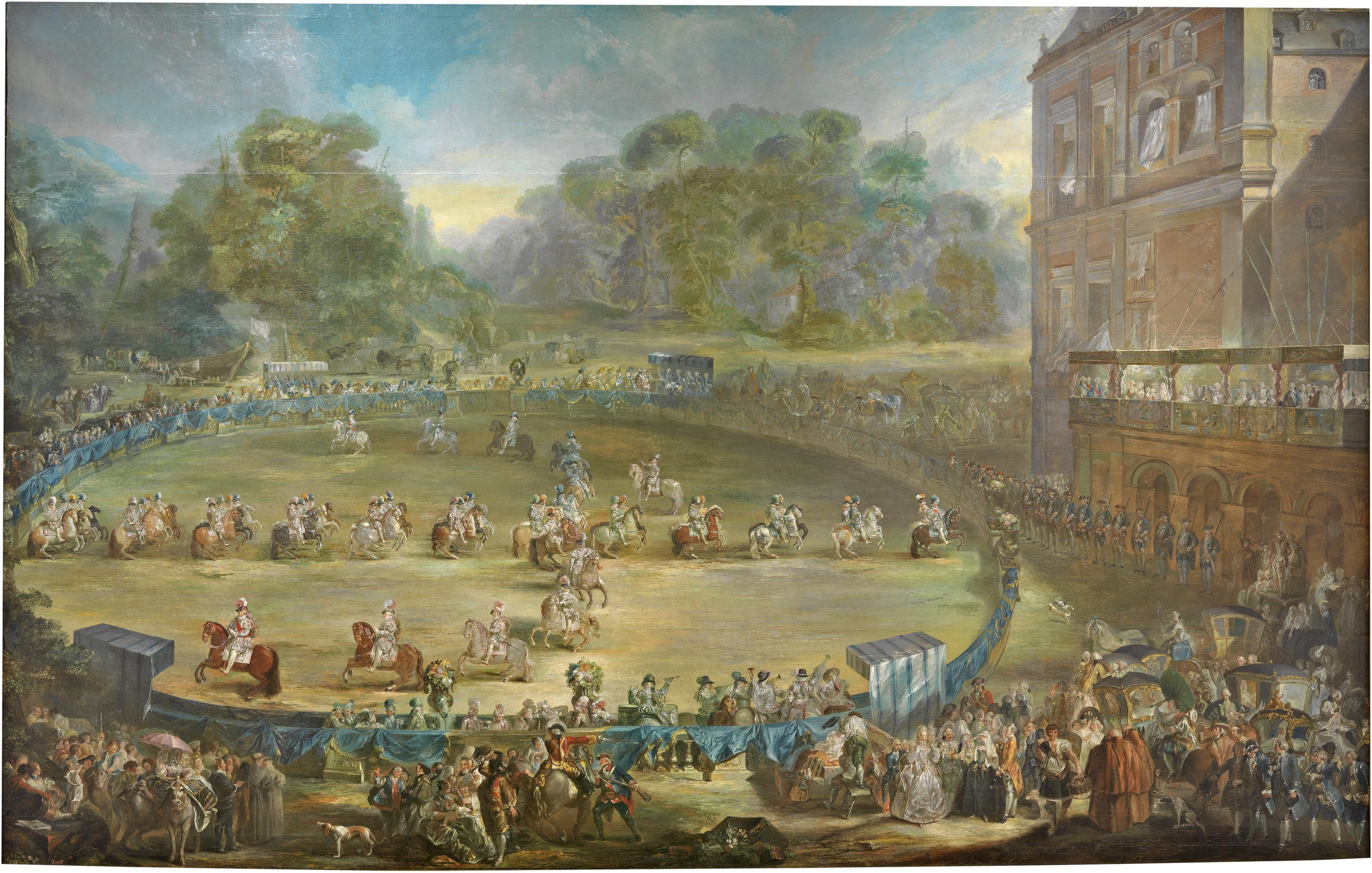
Las parejas reales (an equestrian festival held outside the palace) by Luis Paret y Alcázar in 1770. Currently in Museo del Prado.

The south of the palace is a large open square known as Plaza de las Parejas in reference to equestrian events formerly held there. (The nobility competed or paraded in pairs or parejas). It is defined on the east by a Renaissance style two-story building, which was the auxiliary dependence of the palace (Casa de Caballeros y Oficios – now the local law courts and tax offices). To the west a warehouse area, servant halls and (after the fire) a separate kitchen-house (Casa de Fogones). In front – facing the palace (later a hotel) is the Casa del Principe de Paz, intended to be the residence of Manuel Godoy.

The palace consists of two floors. The ground level is lit by windows crowned by semicircular arches, while the upper floor opens onto balconies with iron railings. The central body of the palace rises to a third level surmounted by a pediment bearing the shield of Ferdinand VI. At the sides of the shield are engraved two inscriptions. The left one reads "Philippus II / Institvit / Philippus V / provexit" (initiated by Philip II and continued by Philip V). The right one reads " Ferdinandu / VI Pius Felix / Consummavit / An MDCCLII" (Completed in 1752 by the faithful and devout Ferdinand VI).

=== Structure ===
The entire structure is built in red brick with white limestone details from Colmenar de Oreja.

=== Entrance ===
Public access is to the east, via the M-305 road and boat-bridge. For royalty, the traditionally formal access to the Palace is to cross the river Tagus by the (now closed) road to the west near the confluence and then travel eastwards, entering via the Plaza de Armas and through the portico of the central body.

The central rise in the elevation of the building is to emphasise the main portico that is framed by five symmetrical exterior arches. On the ledge are statues carved by Pedro Martinengo portraying Philip II, Philip V and Ferdinand VI.

On either side of the portico, the wings have three grand terminal arches to further emphasise the grandeur of this royal access. Above the portico is a large balcony with stone parapets overlooking the courtyard.

The portico provides access to the interior through a hall that in turn leads to a grand central staircase made by Giacomo Bonavía at the behest of Ferdinand VI. The balustrade is of black iron with gold trim and fits within the Rococo trend. From the ceiling hangs an Empire style large chandelier gilt bronze and crystal from La Granja.

=== Interior ===
Behind the palace's main body is an interior courtyard around which are distributed the various halls. In both corners can be seen two small towers surmounted by domes resting on shallow circular drums with small windows that illuminate the interior, in one of which is set a clock.

The lobby is decorated with sculptures and on the top floor are three marble busts inside alcoves representing Louis XIV of France, his wife Maria Theresa of Spain and their son Louis, Grand Dauphin. These busts were made in 1683 by French sculptor Antoine Coysevox. The presence of these three French characters in the palace is explained by the connections to the Spanish Royal Bourbon family with the French monarchy and particularly The Grand Dauphin who was the father of Philip V and his parents, the grandparents of Philip.

In almost all halls of are clocks of all sizes and characteristics, as King Charles IV was a collector of clocks and an Horologer.

==== Salón de Guardias de la Reina (Space for the guards of the Queen) ====
This salon is decorated with three mural scenes from the life of King Solomon, painted by Italian Luca Giordano. The furniture is of olive wood from the time of King Charles IV, and the clocks are from the collection of Charles IV.

==== Salón de la Reina Isabel II (the room of Queen Isabel II) ====
This salon is decorated with mythological scenes painted by Luca Giordano: Jupiter and Leda, Aeolus (the god of wind) and Triptolemus (the threefold warrior). The furniture is of Empire style.

=== Antecámara de Música (Musical antechamber) ===
Popularly known as Salón del tranvía, it was nicknamed "the tram-station". This space was used for reception of important personalities. It is decorated with biblical scenes of the 17th-century Italian school and religious paintings by Francesco Solimena.

=== Sala de Música de la Reina (The music room of the Queen) ===
An olive wood piano made in England was a gift of Empress Eugénie de Montijo to Queen Isabella II. The rest of the furniture is Empire style mahogany. The bronze neo-Gothic lamp hanging from the ceiling is 19th-century.

=== Anteoratorio de la Reina (The ante-oratory of the Queen) ===
This room features a mosaic made from tessera produced in the Vatican workshop. It was a gift from Pope Leo XIII to King Alfonso XII on the occasion of his marriage to Maria Christina of Austria.

=== Oratorio de la Reina (Queen's oratory) ===
The windows overlook the central courtyard. Rebuilt in the time of King Charles IV by Juan de Villanueva. Decorated with stucco, in its walls are frescoes painted around 1791 by Francisco Bayeu y Subías, who was the brother in law of Francisco de Goya. The subjects represented are Adoration of the Magi, Adoration of the Shepherds, the Flight into Egypt, Visitation and Zechariah and St. Elizabeth with the Virgin Mary. In addition to the pillars that form the frame of the main altar are St. Matthew and St. Luke. In the center of the vault is depicted God the Father with a celestial host of angels. At top of the dome flies the dove of the Holy Spirit. The canvas of the Immaculate Mary occupying the central space is by Mariano Salvador Maella.

=== Salón del Trono (Throne Room) ===
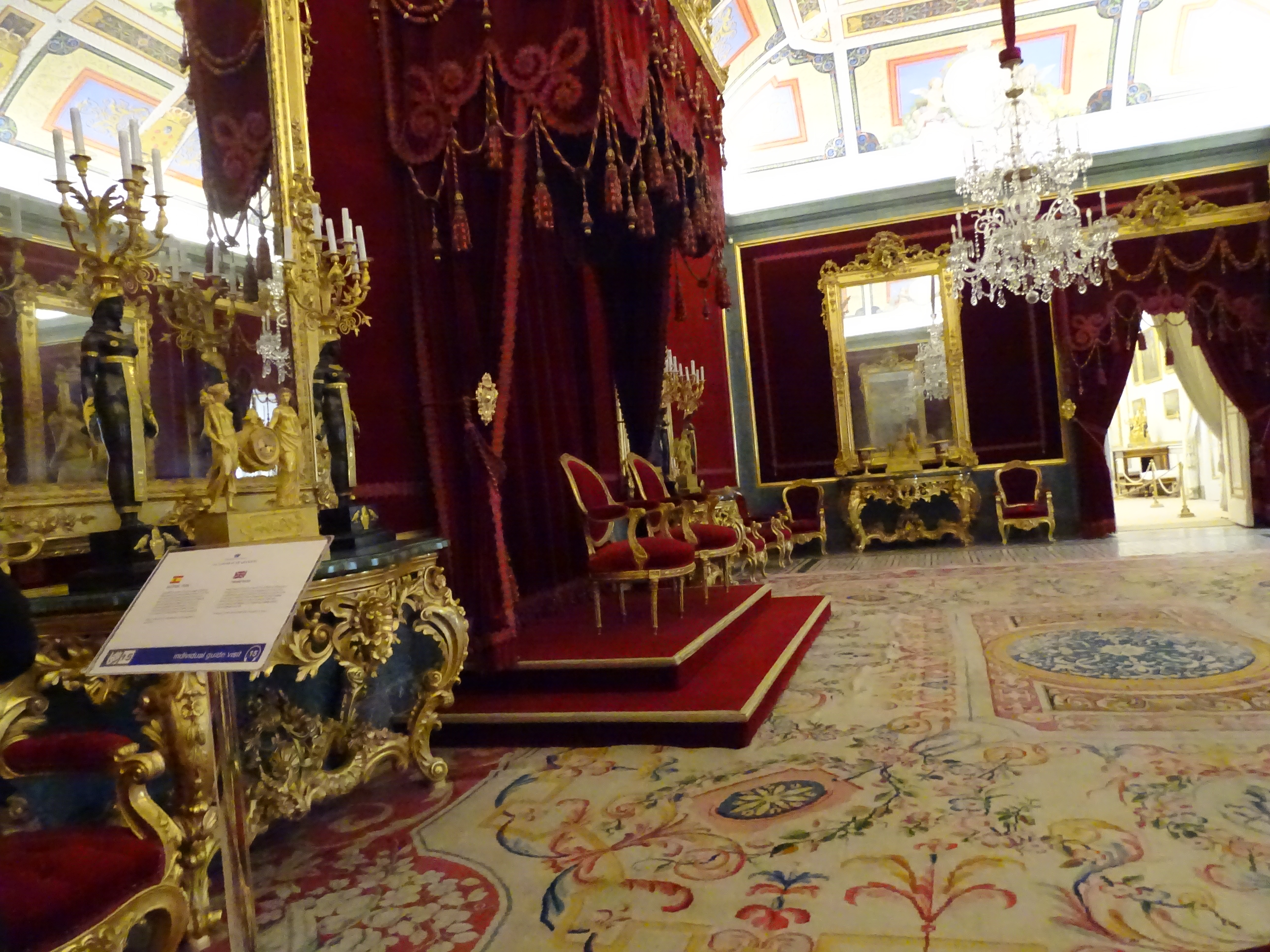
Salón del Trono

The recessed dome is decorated with Pompeian style frescoes attributed to Vicente Camarón in 1851 and represent the Monarchy. The royal crown is supported by figures of Venus and Industry. To the right stands Arts and left Abundance and Prudence. Around the hall runs a stucco base that simulates marble with green serpentine tones. In this hall kings officiated during formal visits. The walls are lined with red velvet. The furniture is mostly from the period of Isabella II, except for the decorative French Louis XVI style royal thrones that were used by Alfonso XII and his wife.

=== Despacho de la Reina (Queen's office) ===
This room was used by Isabel II as an office, after it was a bedroom. Paintings decorate its walls, including the Vase by Jan Brueghel the Elder. A landscape by Martínez del Mazo, two paintings of small size with view of classical buildings, painted by Francisco Galli Bibiena, and three vases by Arellano are some other of most interesting. The vault is frescoed in Pompeian style by Mariano Salvador Maella with scenes from the Passion of Christ. Next to this hall is a small chapel or private oratory with a painting of the Virgin by Luca Giordano. The lamp hanging from ceiling is of La Granja de San Ildefonso' glass. The furniture is from the era of Charles IV, built at the Royal Workshop, highlighting in them fine marquetry work.

=== Gabinete de Porcelana (Porcelain room) ===
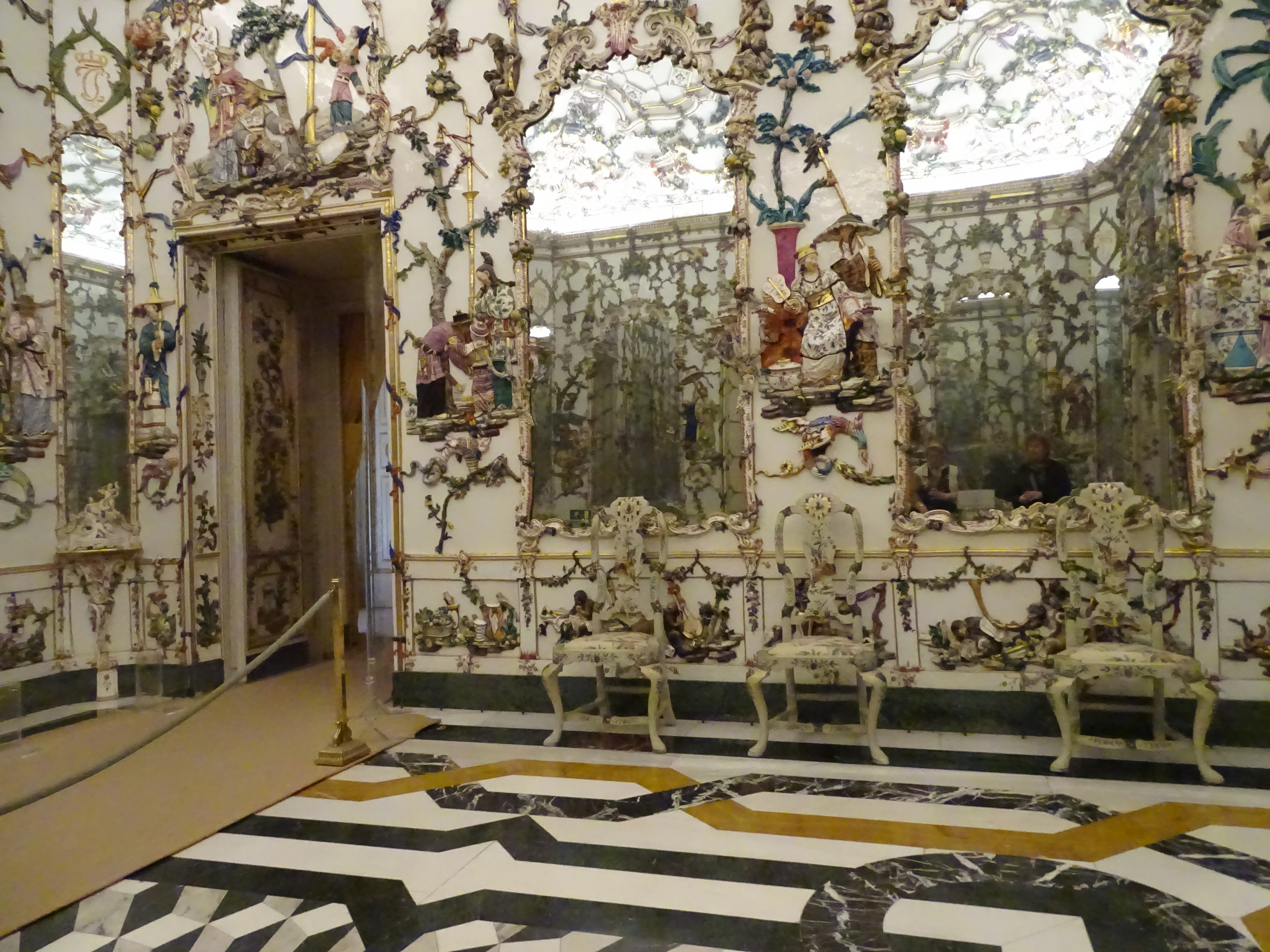
Gabinete de Porcelana

This room was commissioned by Charles III. It is a work by the Royal Porcelain Factory of the Buen Retiro in Madrid. A medium-sized hall, its walls and ceilings are completely lined by plaques of white porcelain and reliefs with Rococo decoration of chinoiserie motifs (garlands of flowers, fruits, monkeys, vases, mandarins, parrots, samurais, birds and dragons). The ceramic plaques are attached to timber walls by screws. They were made between 1760 and 1765 by Giuseppe Gricci. The floor is marble. Eight large mirrors against the walls multiply the effect of the decorations. Interspersed with the above-described decoration are human groups in everyday scenes. In the center of the ceiling arises a lamp taking the form of a palm, while a Chinese with a hand fan and a monkey on his shoulders climbs the trunk. The purpose of this room was as a games room and playground.

=== Dormitorio de la Reina (Queen's bedroom) ===
The dome is decorated with tempera frescoes by Zacarías González Velázquez with allegories of Science, Virtue, Art, Law and Monarchy. The centerpiece is the Isabella II style bed a gift of the city of Barcelona to Queen Isabella II during her marriage to Francis of Assisi of Bourbon. The consoles are works by French cabinetmaker Daumier's workshop.

=== Tocador de la Reina (Queen's boudoir) ===
The walls of this room are covered with silk curtains of Valencian factories. The boudoir is of palo santo wood, with mirrors on both sides and a chair with mother of pearl and gold inlay. The furniture is of Isabella II, while the vault is painted by Vicente Camarón with representations of the seasons.

=== Salón de Baile (Ballroom) ===
Serves as a dividing hall between the private rooms of King and Queen. The furniture is of late-19th century Isabella II style decoration, but is unrelated to the original furniture, which disappeared in a fire in late-19th century.

=== Comedor de gala (Formal dining room) ===
Formerly a debating chamber during the reign of Ferdinand VI, Charles III used it as a banquet hall for gala occasions, as the palace has several less formal dining rooms. It has a vaulted ceiling painted around 1750 by Jacopo Amigoni with a complicated moralizing symbology. The figure of Father Time is surrounded by women who are trying to clip his wings to prevent time flying away. Truth is portrayed as matron of angels while Wisdom pays her homage. The monarchy is depicted by its positive attributes and virtues (Justice, Religion, Bounty, the Angel of Peace with an olive branch, Faith and Charity as a woman protecting children). There is a series of grisaille representing parts of the world where the Monarchy had its possessions. Occasionally this space was also used as a ballroom. The floor is Rococo style of very good quality, with stucco work by Carlo Antonio Bernasconi, representing military attributes, sheet music and musical instruments.

=== Dormitorio del Rey (King's bedroom) ===
The Empire style wooden bed is mahogany with bronze applications. The vault was frescoed by Jacopo Amigoni and Bartolomé Rusca, highlighting in them allegories of Peace, Justice and Abundance made by Bartolomé Rusca. On the bed is a canvas of christ Cristo en la Cruz by Anton Raphael Mengs of 1761. Also a canvas of 1825 the Madonna and Child by José de Madrazo y Agudo. This room adjoins a small hall.

=== Salón de espejos (Mirrors's room) ===
The room is called Salón de espejos because its walls are decorated completely with mirrors from the La Granja de San Ildefonso's factory. The hall was used as a dressing room for King Charles IV. The ceiling is frescoed in Pompeian style, done by Juan de Mata Duque around 1803.

=== Salón árabe (Moorish room) ===
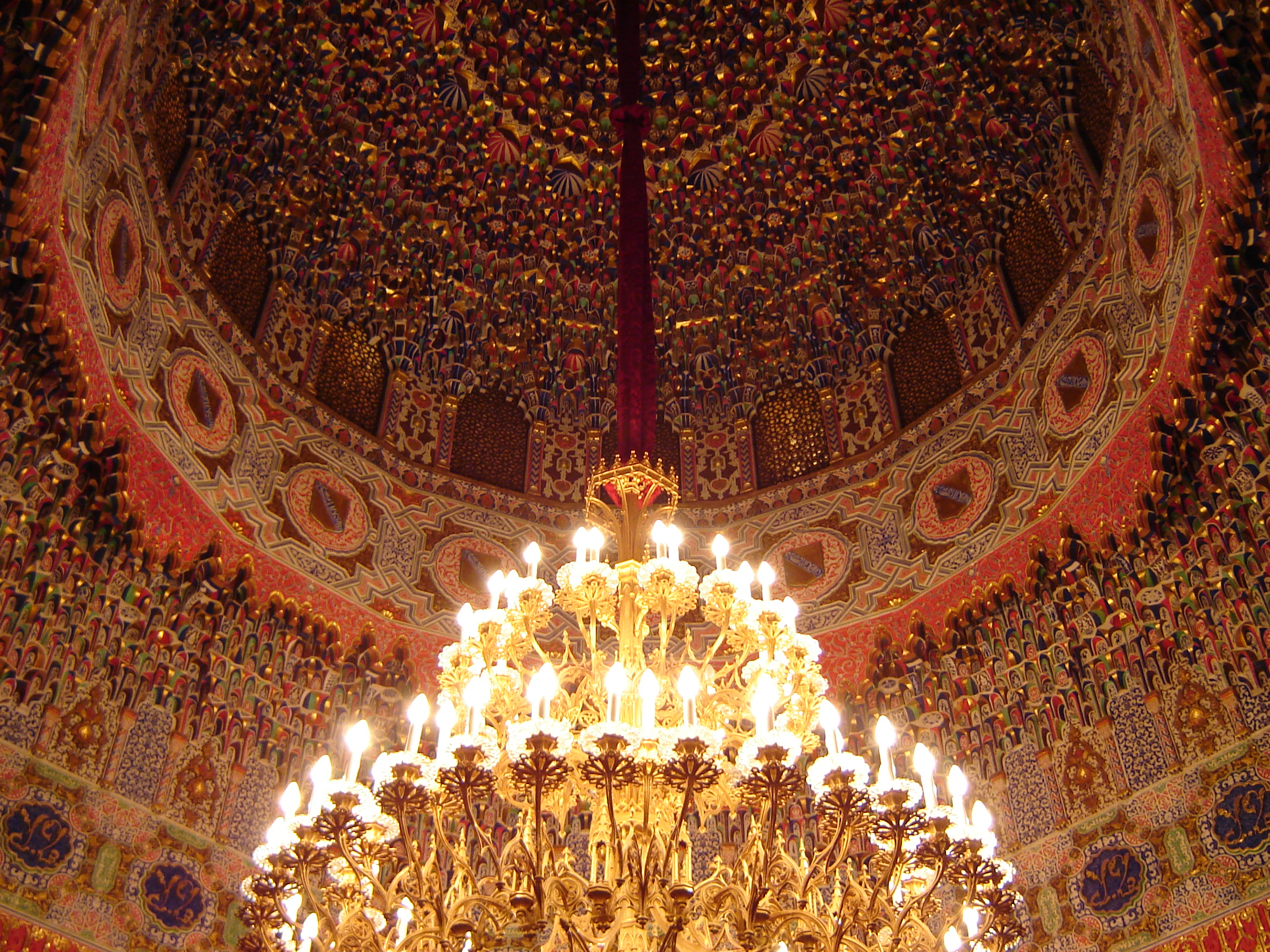
Salón Árabe

This hall was made for Queen Isabella II between 1847 and 1851, decorated with a Moorish fantasy (neo-Nasrid) based in mozarabs, similar to the Sala de Dos Hermanas of the Alhambra in Granada. Work by Rafael Contreras Muñoz, along with the Gabinete de Porcelana, are the two most admired sights. Its furniture consists of a porcelain central table and a bronze and crystal lamp. It was used as a smoking room mainly for men. The decoration of the walls is made of brightly colored plaster work.

=== Despacho del Rey (King's office) ===
This vault with frescoes of Pompeian style was by Juan de Mata Duque and offers allegories of the Liberal Arts. An olive desk decorated with bronze and marble. The Empire style furniture is made by Jacob Desmalter, Napoleon's cabinetmaker.

=== Sala de estudio del Rey (King's study room) ===
This Pompeian style vault was painted by Juan de Mata Duque and the furniture is of Carlos IV style.

=== Sala China (Chinese room) ===
Inside is a collection of two hundred and three small paintings that the Emperor of China gifted to Queen Isabella II. They are made with ink on rice paper and depict scenes from the court, parties, theater, animals etc. The vault was frescoed by Zacarías González Velázquez and represent mythological scenes in the roof's center and at both sides countryside scenes. From the ceiling hangs a globe lamp with chinoiserie motifs.

=== Sala de guardias del Rey (King's guardroom) ===
This hall is one of the oldest. It is built in the Philip II's time. It has six large paintings by Luca Giordano, three of biblical themes: The death of Absalom, David wearing the breastplate and Construction of Solomon's Temple and three other of military issues. The 18th-century chairs are in mahogany.

== Paintings of the palace ==
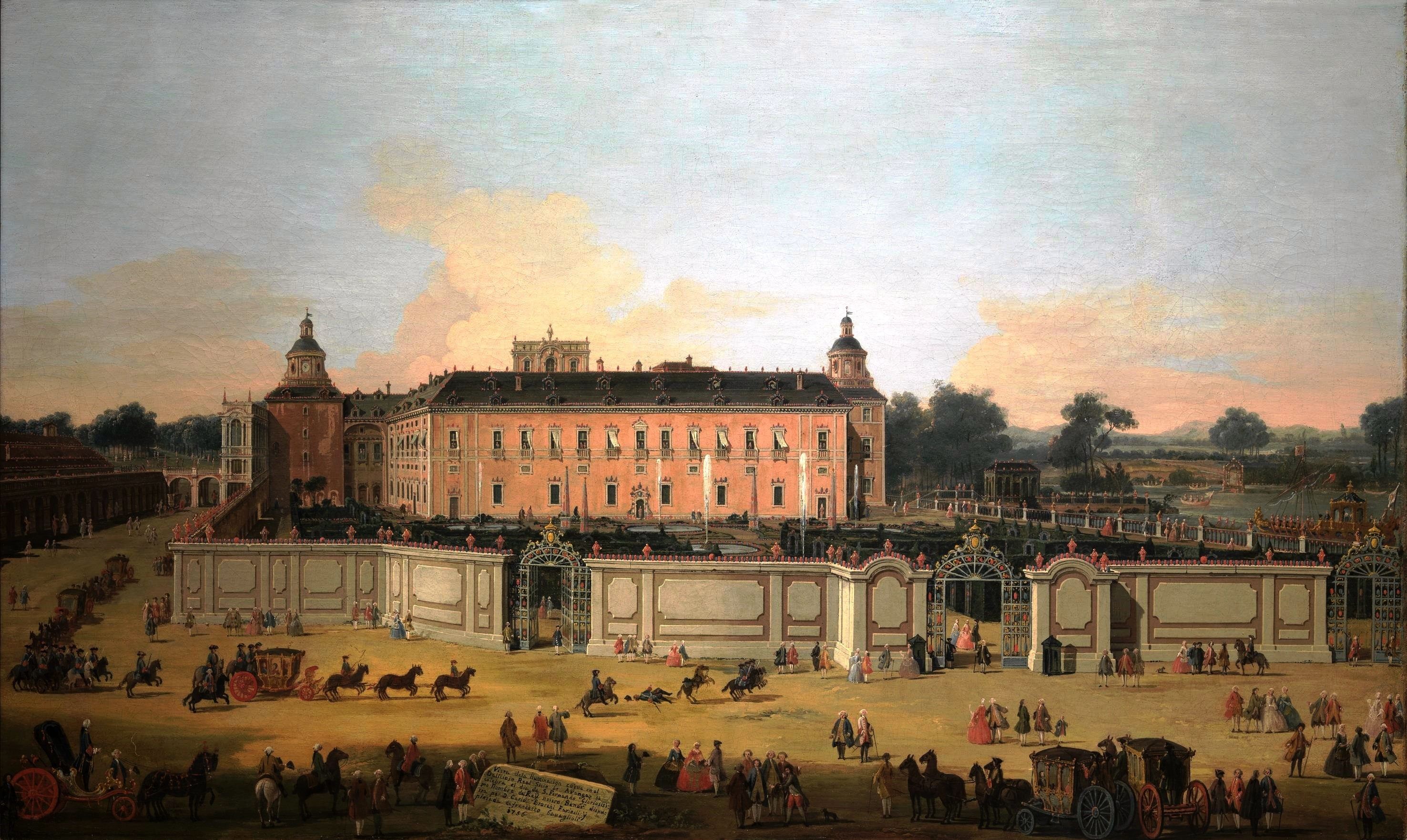
View of the Royal Palace of Aranjuez by Francesco Battaglioli in 1756. Museo del Prado

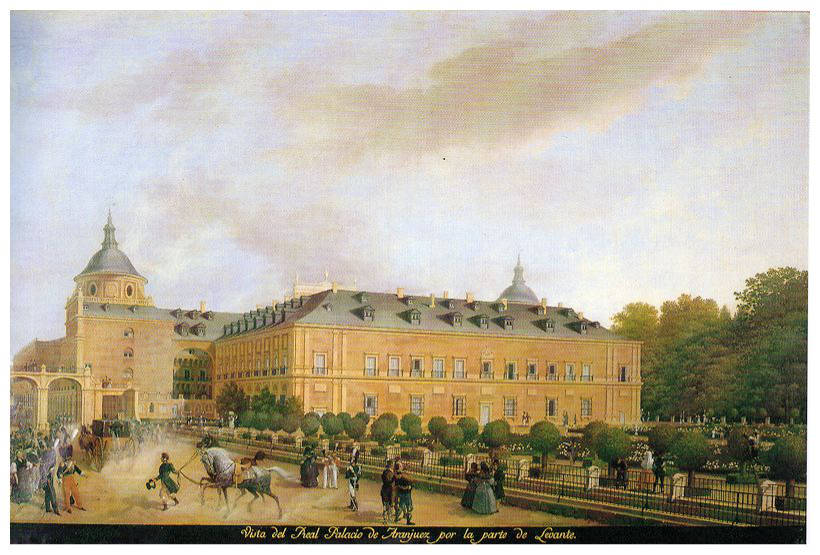
View of the Royal Palace of Aranjuez from the east side by Fernando Brambila published in the work View of the Royal Sites and of Madrid in 1830

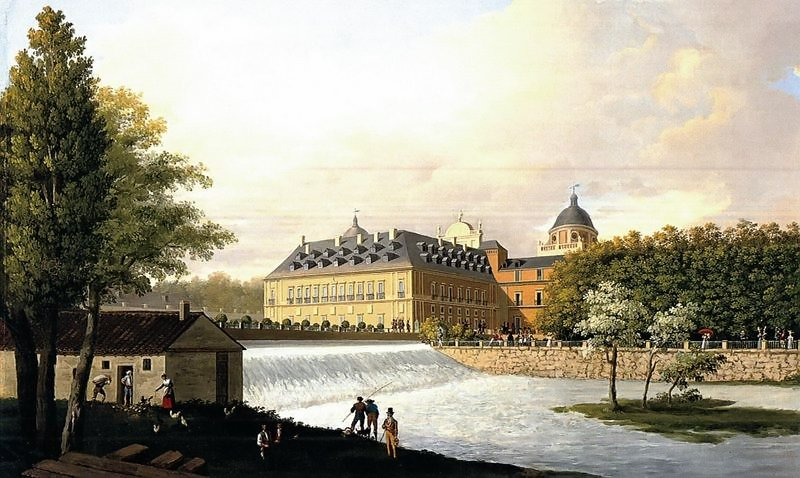
View of the Royal Site of Aranjuez, of the Grande Falls and the Palace; from the east side by Fernando Brambila published in the work View of the Royal Sites and of Madrid in 1830

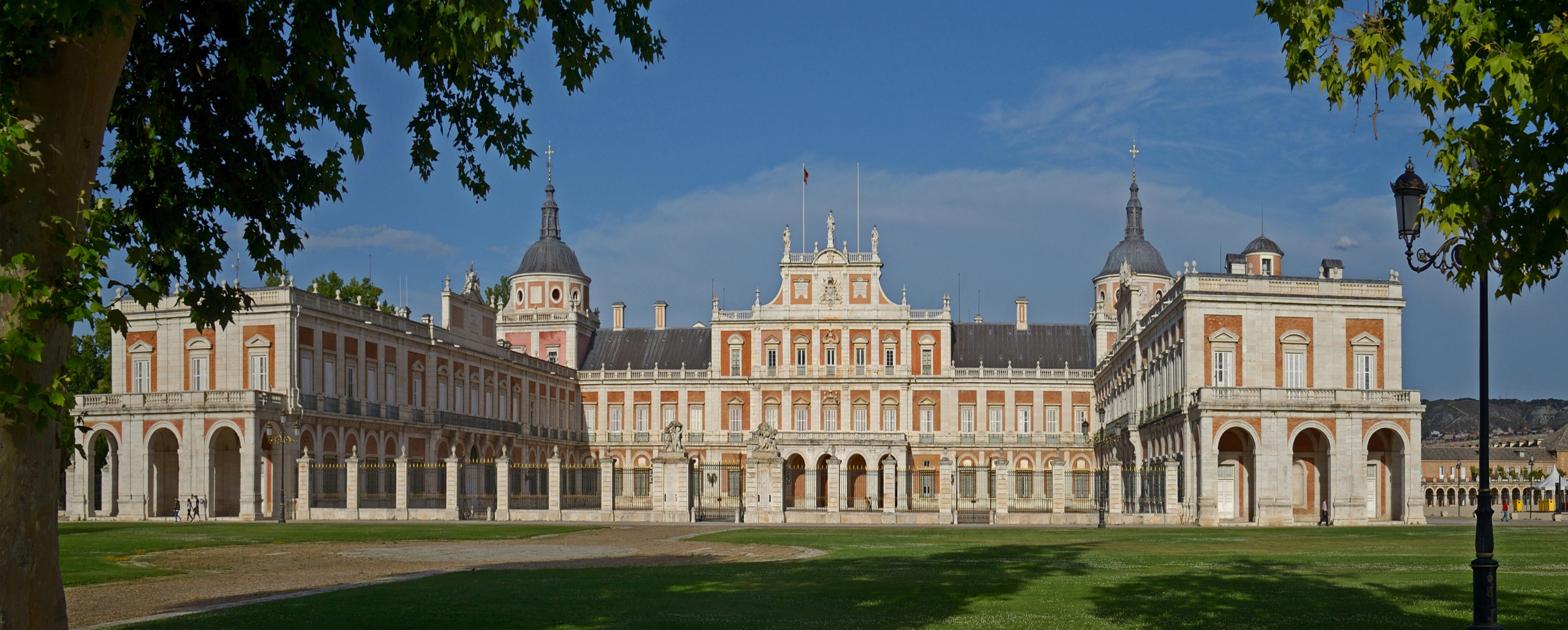

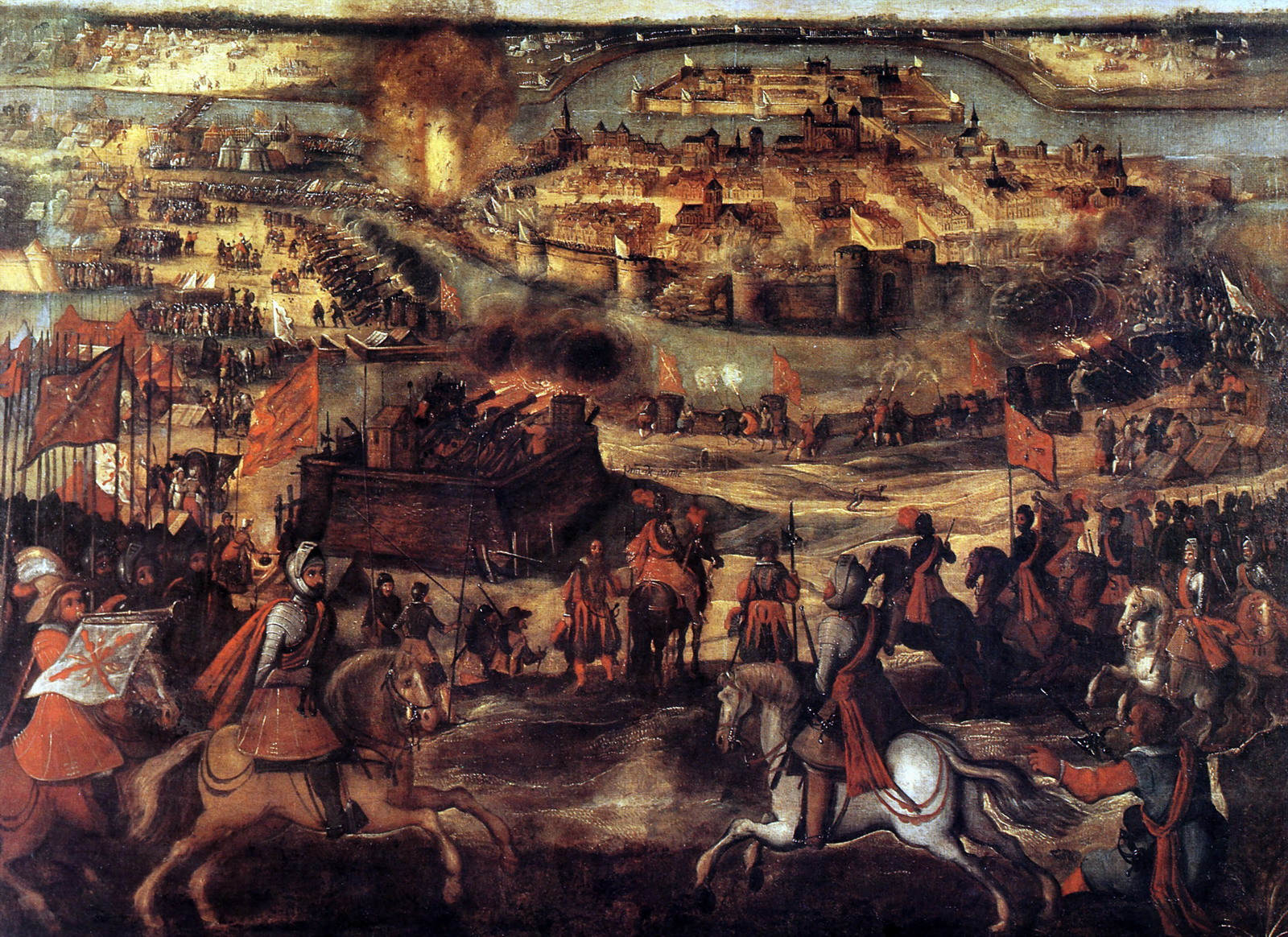
