= Andrea Zucchi =

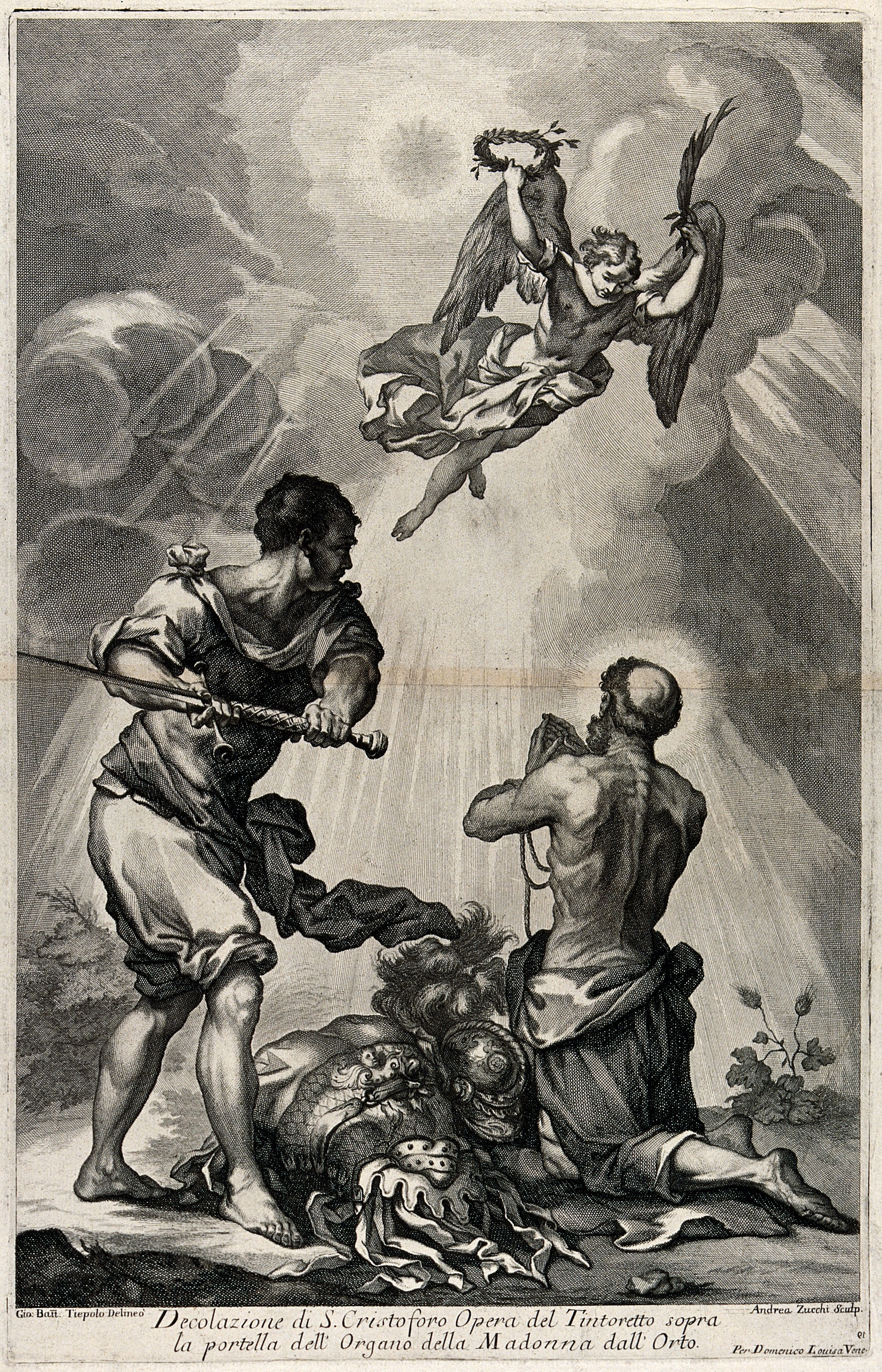
Saint Christopher, after Giambattista Tiepolo

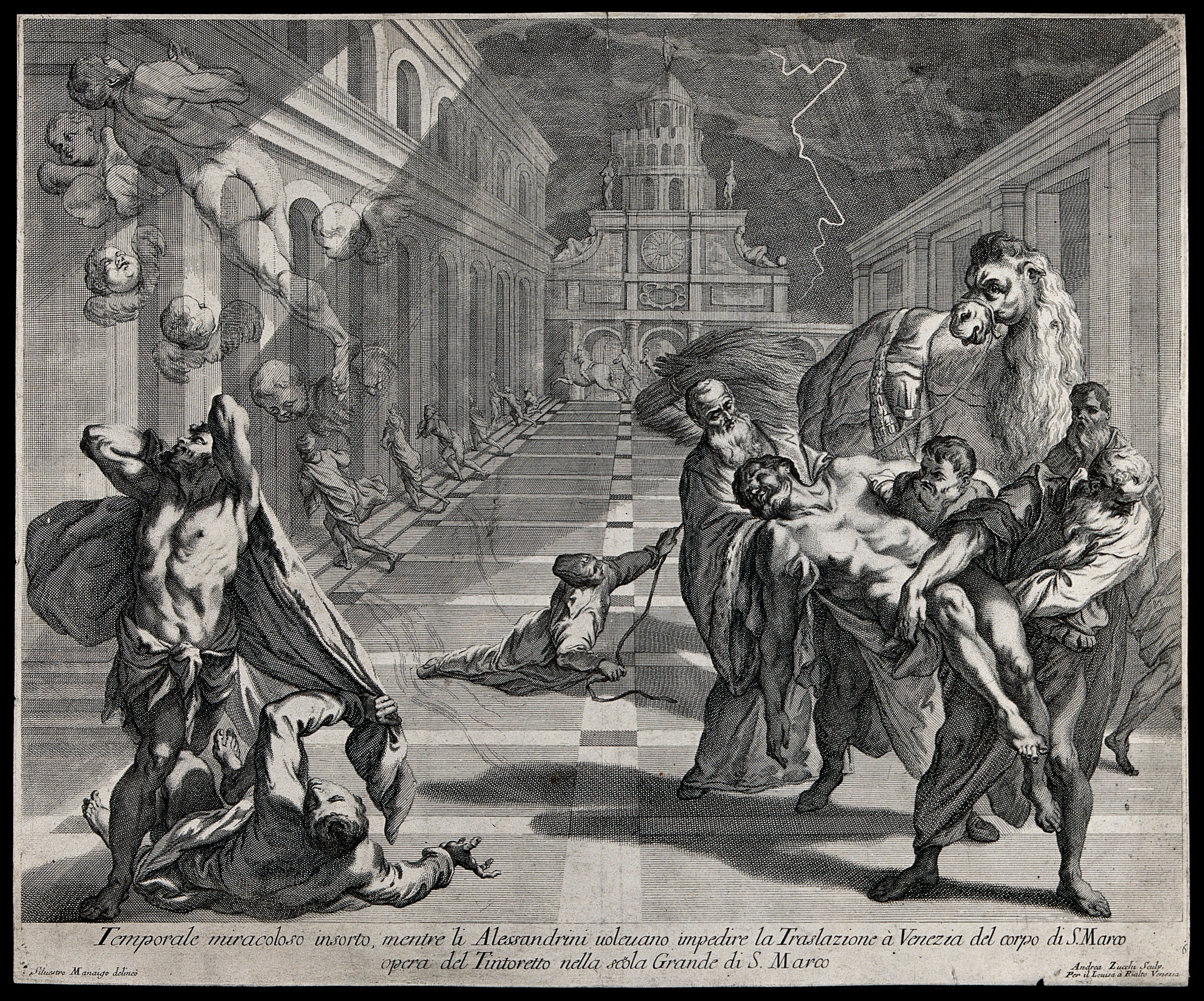
The Martyrdom of Saint Mark, after Silvestro Manaigo

Andrea Zucchi (9 January 1679, Venice - 1740, Dresden) was an Italian painter and engraver.

== Life & Works ==
He was trained by the painters Andrea Celesti and Pietro della Vecchia. He, in turn, trained his younger brothers Carlo (1682-1767) and Francesco in engraving. Together with the latter, he created several plates for the Verona Illustrata by Scipione Maffei. Around 1706, he settled in Pordenone, north of Venice.

According to the RKD, he left Pordenone in 1726 and moved to Dresden. His son Lorenzo went with him and became an engraver for the Electorate of Saxony. There, together with his uncle Francesco, he created tableaux for the Gemäldegalerie Alte Meister.

In 1729, he produced a series of thirteen copper engravings based on drawings created by Carl Heinrich Jacob Fehling (1683-1753), on the occasion of the Saturnusfest of 1719. He began producing set decorations for theaters in 1736.

In addition to engravings made by burin, he was also known for etching. Most of his works are religious or historical in theme, with some illustrations of dressing and costumes. The painters whose works he rendered as engravings include Titian, Paolo Veronese, Pietro Longhi, Niccolò Bambini, Giuseppe Porta, Tintoretto, Sebastiano Ricci and Giambattista Tiepolo
