= Francesco Zucchi =

Italian engraver (1692–1764)

- Veduta of the Teatro Filarmonico, Verona. Engraving by Francesco Zucchi for Maffei's Verona Illustrata, 1731
- Born: 1692; Venice, Republic of Venice
- Died: 13 October 1764 (aged 71–72); Venice, Republic of Venice
- Occupation: Engraver
- Movement: Baroque

Francesco Zucchi (1692 – 13 October 1764), was an Italian engraver, active mainly in Northern Italy. He was the father of Antonio and Giuseppe Zucchi.

== Biography ==
Francesco Zucchi was born in Venice in 1692. He had two brothers: Andrea (1679–1740), a painter and engraver; and Carlo (1682–1767), an architect and engraver. He trained under his brother Andrea in Pordenone. Francesco is also described as close to Pietro Scalvini, for whom he engraved drawings.

At the beginning of his career, Francesco worked in the workshop of his brother Andrea, where they engraved plates for highbrow publications. Their most notable work was on Francesco Scipione Maffei's Verona Illustrata. When Andrea left for Dresden in 1726, Francesco took over his brother's workshop. Initially specialising in book illustration, Francesco later turned to architectural subjects. He worked extensively for booksellers, producing over 200 prints.

He was invited to Dresden to engrave plates based on paintings in the Gemäldegalerie Alte Meister, but his work was interrupted by the Seven Years' War. According to Henry Fuseli, Zucchi never actually went to Dresden but he was sending his works from Venice instead.

Francesco Zucchi produced twenty-four views of Venice for Giovanni Battista Albrizzi's Il Forestiere Illuminato (1740) and city views of Venice, Brescia and Brixen, based on paintings by Francesco Battaglioli. He also produced portraits of prominent Venetian figures. He created numerous illustrations for books, including the 1742 Italian translation of Milton's Paradise Lost, Dante's Divine Comedy, and Antonio Francesco Gori's edition of Longinus' On the Sublime (1733). Francesco Zucchi died in Venice on 13 October 1764.
