= Francesco Battaglioli =

Italian painter (1725–1796)

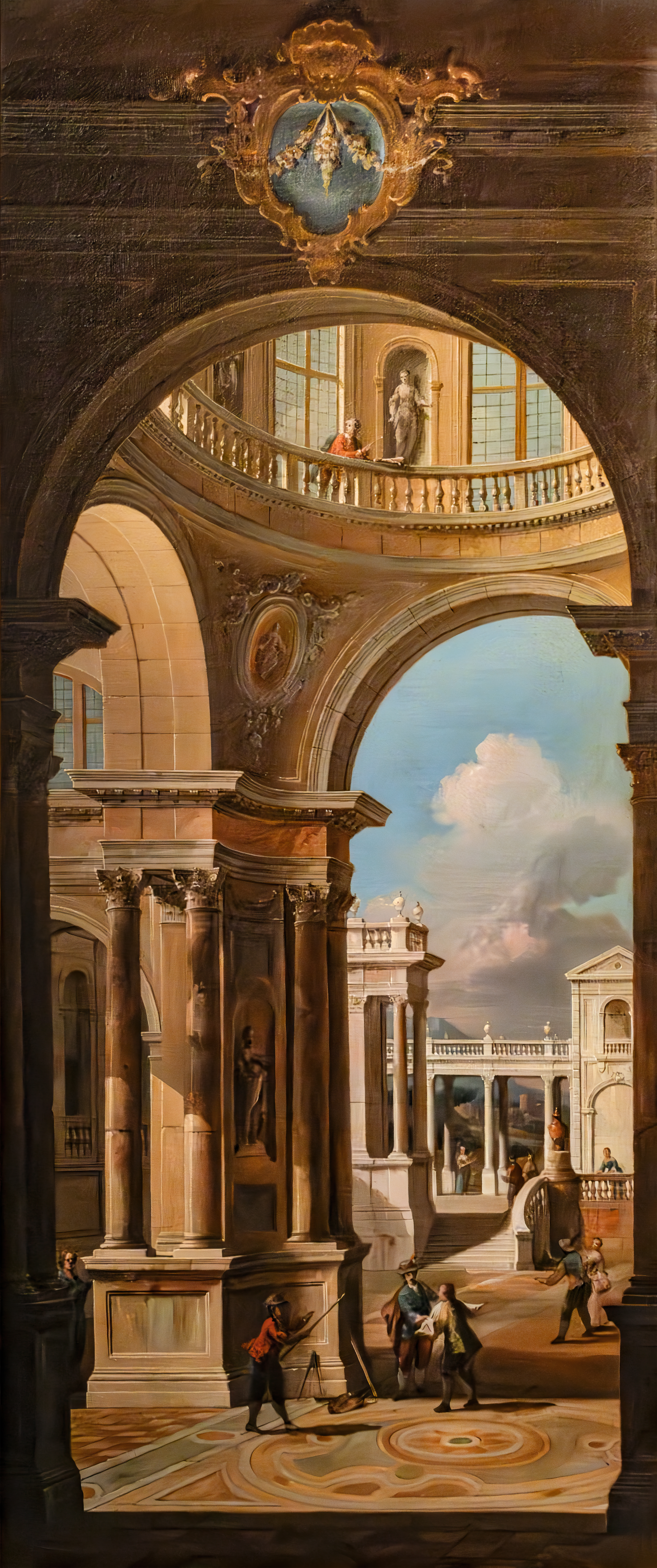
Architectural perspective, 1772-1777, Gallerie dell'Accademia, Venice

Francesco Battaglioli (Modena, 1725 – Venice, 1796) was an Italian painter, known as painter of veduta and capriccios based on the scenery of Venice and the Venetian mainland (Brescia and Treviso).

== Biography ==
Born in Modena around 1725, Battaglioli was a pupil of Raffaello Rinaldi. He joined the Fraglia or guild of painters in Venice between 1747-51. Early in his career, he collaborated with engravers like Francesco Zucchi to create print illustrations (such as the Panorama di Brescia in 1751). In 1754 Battaglioli moved to Madrid to work at the royal court of Ferdinand VI. He painted scenery sets for the Reales Coliseos theater held in the Palacio Real de Aranjuez for the delight of Ferdinand VI. It is believed they were a set of at least four, of which two are exhibited at the Prado Museum in Madrid. In Madrid, Battaglioli also collaborated with Farinelli on stage sets for Pietro Metastasio's operas. Four of these are preserved at the Royal Academy of Fine Arts of San Fernando (La Nitteti, Didone abbandonata, Armida Placata, Act II, Scene VII, and Knight fighting dragons in a forest), and another is held at the Prado (Armida Placata, Act I, Scene IV).

Battaglioli illustrated the Descripción del estado actual del Real Teatro del Buen Retiro (1758; Real Biblioteca del Palacio Real de Madrid, MS.) with 16 drawings. While in Spain he also painted four vedute of the Castle of Villaviciosa de Odón. After the death in 1759 of Ferdinand VI, there was a decline in theatrical performances, and in January 1760 Battaglioli was dismissed from his post. He returned to Italy (c. 1760) and was nominated a member of the Accademia di Belle Arti di Venezia in 1772. In 1778 he succeeded Antonio Visentini as a professor of perspective at the Accademia. The influence of Visentini and that of Michele Marieschi is apparent in such late works as View of a Seaport (1786) and Naval Battle (Venice, Doña delle Rose priv. col.).

== Gallery ==
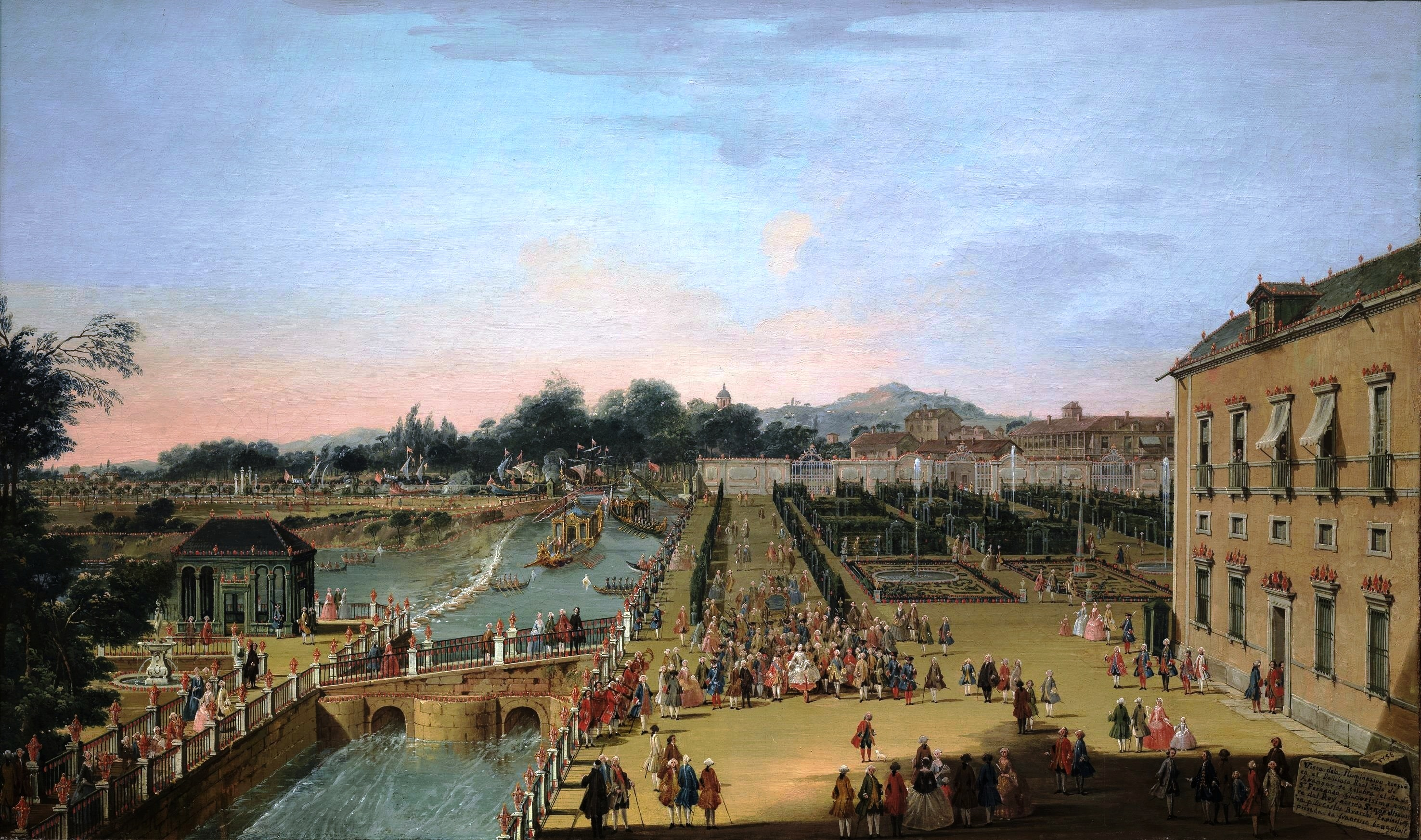
Ferdinand VI and Barbara of Portugal in the gardens of Aranjuez, 1756, Madrid, Museo del Prado

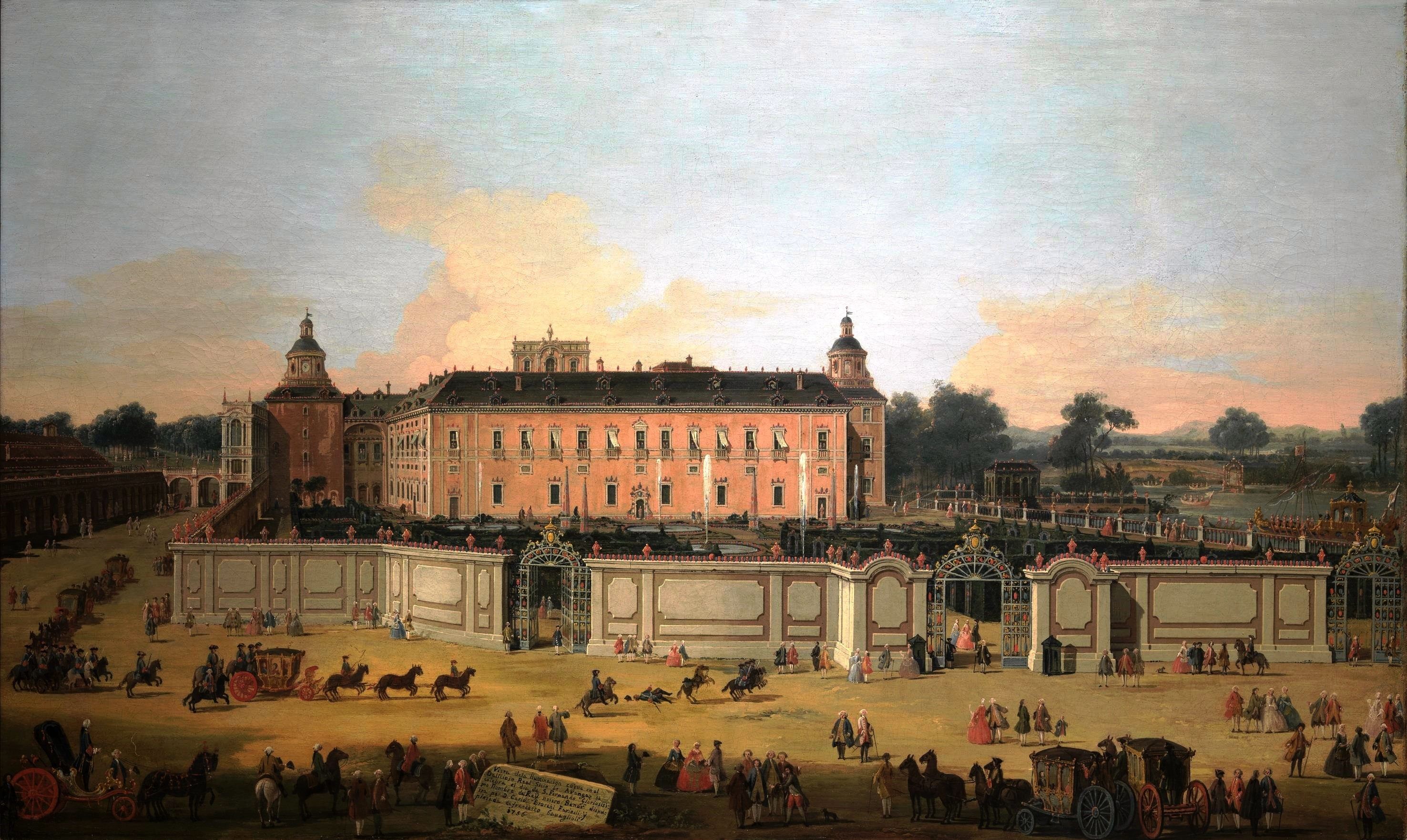
Veduta of the Royal Palace of Aranjuez, 1756, Madrid, Museo del Prado

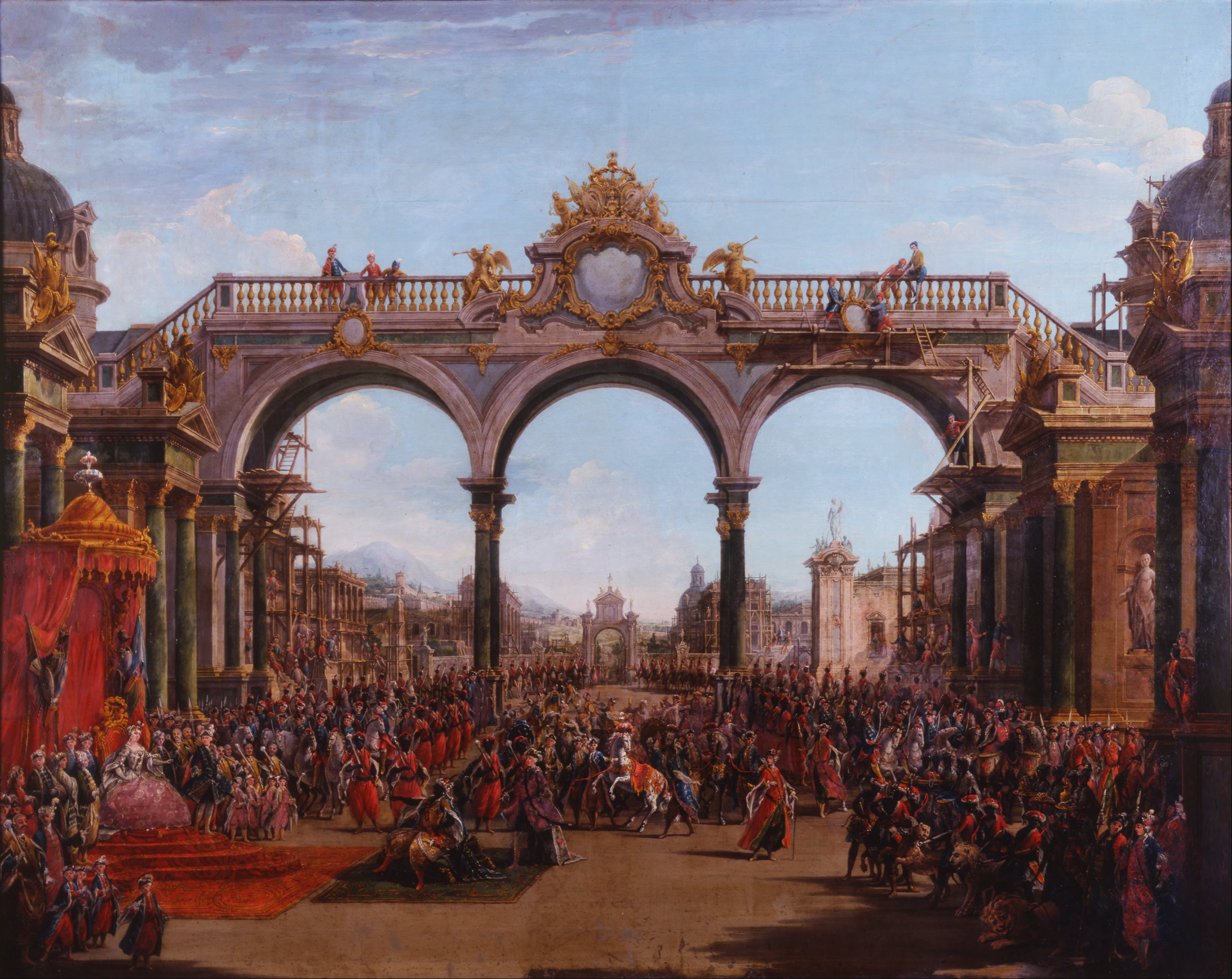
Didone abbandonata, Act I, Scene V, Madrid, Royal Academy of Fine Arts of San Fernando

Nitteti, Act III, Scene X, 1756, Madrid, Royal Academy of Fine Arts of San Fernando

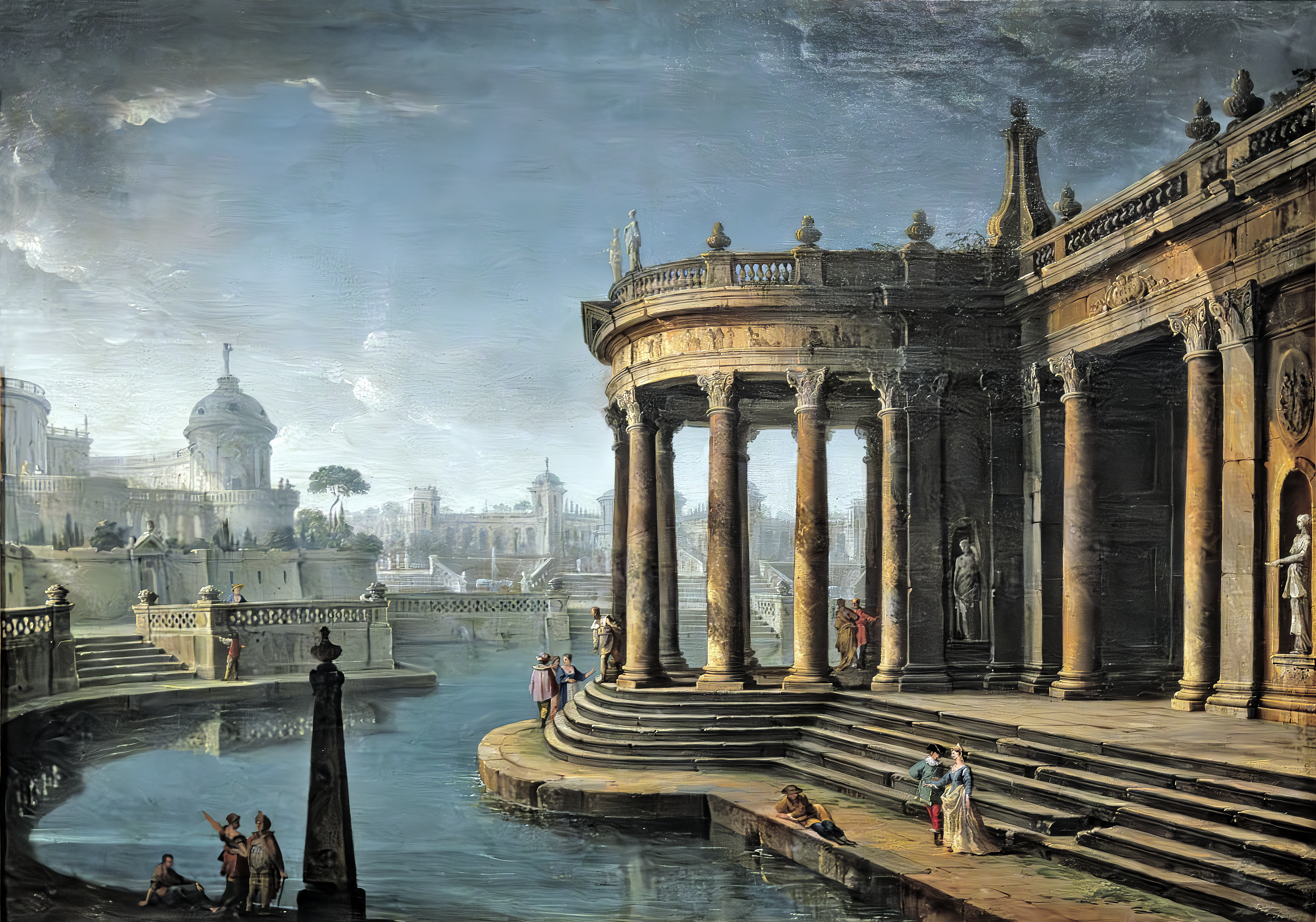
Capriccio with lake and classical architecture, c. 1770, Venice, Ca' Rezzonico

Imaginary Landscape, Madrid, Linares Gallery

Architectural Capriccio, priv. col.

Fresco on the vault of the Teatro Grande, Brescia, by Francesco Zugno and Francesco Battaglioli

== Bibliography ==
- Torrione, Margarita, Francesco Battaglioli. Escenografías para el Real Teatro del Buen Retiro (exhibition catalogue), Madrid, Real Academia de Bellas Artes de San Fernando, Teatro de la Zarzuela, INAEM, 2013.
- Torrione, Margarita, Nueve óleos de Francesco Battaglioli para el Coliseo del Buen Retiro. (La ópera en el reinado de Fernando VI: último relumbrón de la Corte Barroca.), in J. Martínez Millán, C. Camarero Bullón, M. Luzzi Traficante (coords.), La corte de los Borbones: crisis del modelo cortesano, Madrid, Ed. Polifemo, 2013, vol. 3, pp. 1733–1777.
- Torrione, Margarita, "La sociedad de Corte y el ritual de la ópera", in Fernando VI y Bárbara de Braganza. Un reinado bajo el signo de la paz : 1746-1759, exhibition catalogue, Real Academia de Bellas Artes de San Fernando (RABASF), Madrid, 2002, pp. 165–195. ISBN 84-369-3632-9.
- Torrione, Margarita, "Decorados teatrales para el Coliseo del Buen Retiro. Cuatro óleos de Francesco Battaglioli", Reales Sitios (Revista del Patrimonio Nacional), n° 143, 2000, pp. 40–51.
- Torrione, Margarita, «El Real Coliseo del Buen Retiro: memoria de una arquitectura desaparecida», in Torrione, Margarita (ed.), España festejante. El Siglo XVIII, Málaga, CEDMA, 2000, pp. 295–322. ISBN 84-7785-370-3.
- Torrione, Margarita, Crónica festiva de dos reinados en la Gaceta de Madrid : 1700-1759, Paris, Ophrys, 1998. ISBN 2-7080-0861-7.
- Links, J.G. (1977). Canaletto and his Patrons. London: Paul Elek Ltd. pp. 99–100.

== Other projects ==
Media related to Francesco Battaglioli at Wikimedia Commons

- Ivanoff, Nicola (1965). "BATTAGLIOLI, Francesco". Dizionario Biografico degli Italiani (in Italian). Vol. 7: Bartolucci–Bellotto. Rome: Institute of the Italian Encyclopaedia. ISBN 978-88-12-00032-6.
