= Solís Theatre =

Theatre in Montevideo, Uruguay

Coordinates: 34°54′29″S 56°12′04″W

Solis Theatre
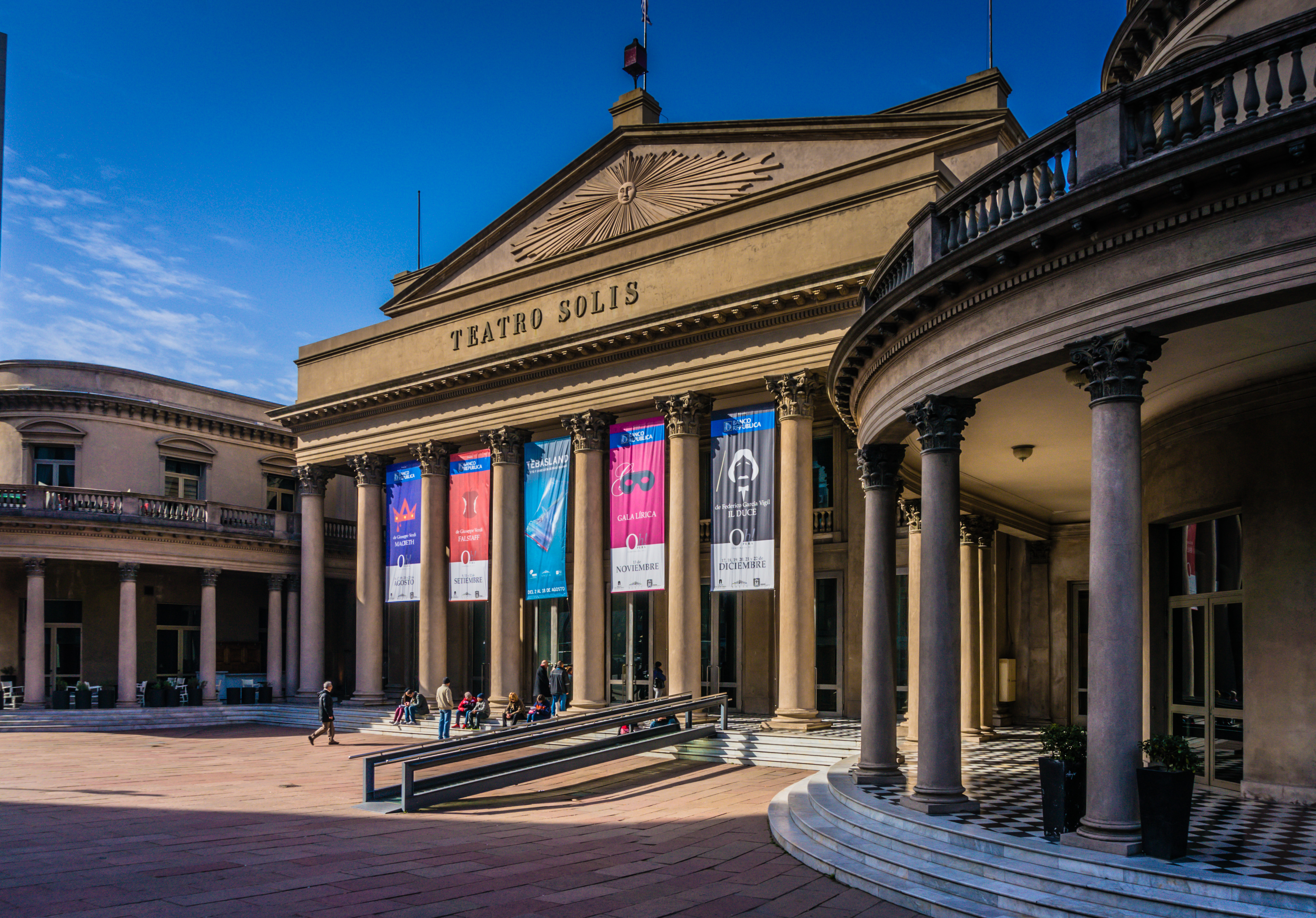
- Teatro Solis in 2016
- Interactive map of Solis Theatre
- Address: Buenos Aires 678; Montevideo; Uruguay
- Owner: Government of Montevideo
- Capacity: 1500
- Type: Municipal (Montevideo)
- Current use: Opera, Ballet, Concerts, Plays

Construction
- Opened: 1856
- Renovated: 1996 - 2004
- Years active: 161
- Architects: Carlo Zucchi; Francisco Xavier Garmendia; Víctor Rabú

Website
- www.teatrosolis.org.uy

Solís Theatre (Spanish: Teatro Solís) is Uruguay's most important and renowned theater. It opened in 1856. The building was designed by the Italian architect Carlo Zucchi. It is located in Montevideo's Old Town, right next to the Plaza Independencia. The theatre was named after the explorer Juan Díaz de Solís, who was the first European explorer to land in modern day Uruguay.

In 1998, the government of Montevideo started a major reconstruction of the theatre, which included two columns designed by Philippe Starck. The reconstruction was completed in 2004 with the re-opening taking place in August of that year. Acoustic studies of the rehabilitation project was entrusted to Jerome Falala of the French studio Avel Acoustique.

Tomás Giribaldi's La Parisina, considered the first Uruguayan national opera, was premiered at the Solís on 14 September 1878.

== History ==
=== Project's conception ===
In 1833, a group of influential citizens in Montevideo came together to form a group of stakeholders to construct a new theatre, they formed the Theater Committee which was led by Francisco Margariños. In 1840, the committee received approval from the government to construct a new theatre. The board of directors for the theatre's construction was led by Juan Francisco Giró. Also, the board included distinguished citizens such as Luis Lamas, Juan Miguel Martínez, Juan Benito Blanco, Francisco Solano Antuña, Ramón Atragaveytia, and Vincente Vázquez.

The first meeting of the committee took place on 16 June of the same year. The conception of the theatre was to be a cultural center that represented one's free spirit, and that primarily worked to provide the emerging society of the Eastern State of Uruguay a place for harmony, prosperity, and wealth.

The motivation behind constructing a theatre was to have a worthy place where one could be seen socializing and flaunt one's social and political influence. The necessity behind constructing a theatre in Montevideo was the need to elevate one's social and political status through civil associations that had a cultural, scientific, and commercial nature. Therefore, the new theatre would offer a platform for socializing among the societal elite.

=== The Zucchi Project ===
In August 1840, the Italian architect Carlo Zucchi presented his plans for the theatre to the stakeholders of the project, detailing where he wanted to construct the theatre.

In his report, Zucchi identified and described the area that surrounded the theatre, his suggestions are listed in the following:

- A: Area defined by the streets Sarandí, Bartolomé Mitre, Buenos Aires, the beltway Plaza Independencia, and crossed by the street Bacacay.
- B: The city block defined by Plaza Independencia, and the streets Ciudadela, San José y Liniers.
- C: The city block defined by the streets Buenos Aires, Bartolomé Mitre, Reconquista y Liniers.

In this information, Zucchi demonstrated concerns about the location of the theatre, he argued that the choice of location would affect its structure, layout and overall appearance. He specified the elements of the theatre, such as the arrangement of the orchestra section, the forum, the sewer system, the cistern and water tanks that would feed into the hydraulic pump system. So that it would be in accord with the predominant hygienist influence as they were susceptible to the type of soil that the theatre would be placed upon. Moreover, Zucchi put caution to the floor that would be chosen, as it would need to be suitable for all these elements. He mentioned the increase in budget due to the possibility of constructing embarkments, and the variations that the structure of the building would present.

Out of the three options of the surrounding area for the theatre, Zucchi preferred option A because it was more suitable for their building. However, in his report he notes how this location had a history of being irregularly lotted. Then the reports changes focus onto option C, mentioning the excavation work that would need to be done, and the existence of a ravine, which could be used as the drainage system. There are disadvantages to this location, Zucchi considered how the presence of the theatre would affect the population of the surrounding area. Additionally, Zucchi considered the different terrains, which resulted in him considering this option.

Due to the information presented, the Theater Committee choose option C, and bought the land for 31,000 pesos. The property was on the outskirts of the city, the land was 20 blocks by 15 blocks and surrounded by ravines, ditches, dunes, and roads. At that time, the expansion of the outside walls outlined by José María Reyes, known as the New City (Ciudad Nueva), had not been completed.

== Characteristics ==
The theatre is located in the Old City neighborhood, with the main entrance on the corner of Buenos Aires Street and Bartolomé Mitre.

The building's facade has similarities to Teatro Carlo Felice in Genoa, Italy. The theatre's concert hall has a slight elliptical shape, similar to the concert hall of La Scala in Milan. The interior of the Solís theatre resembles the Italian Teatro Metastasio, near the city of Florence, Italy.

== Image gallery ==
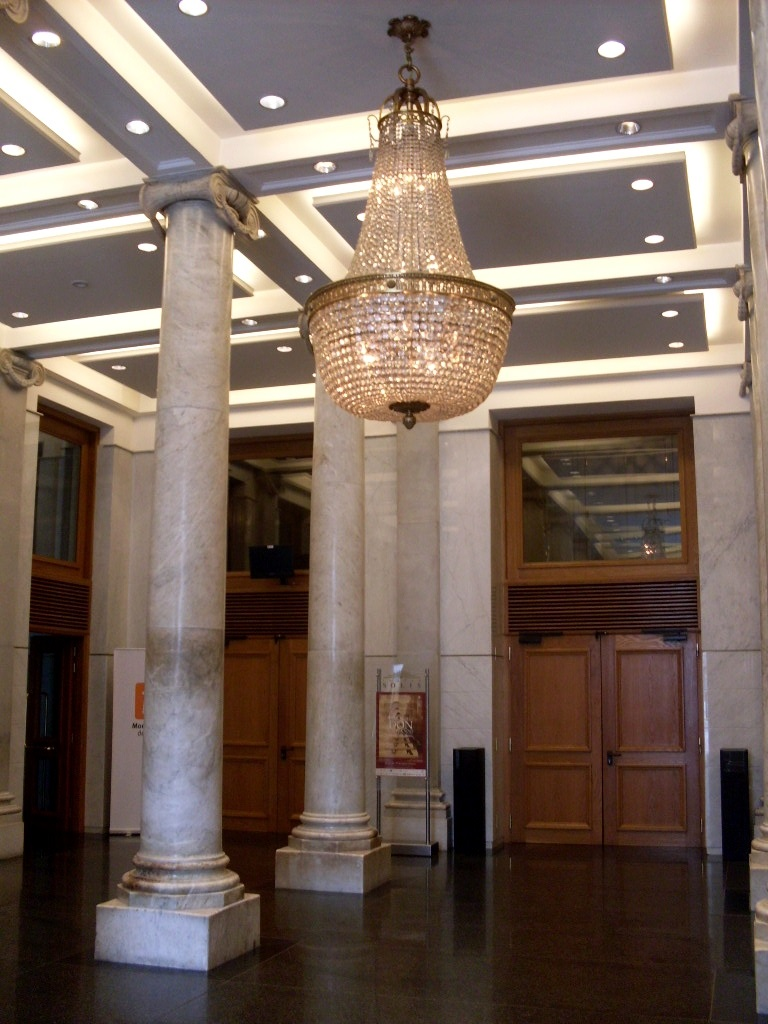
Corridor

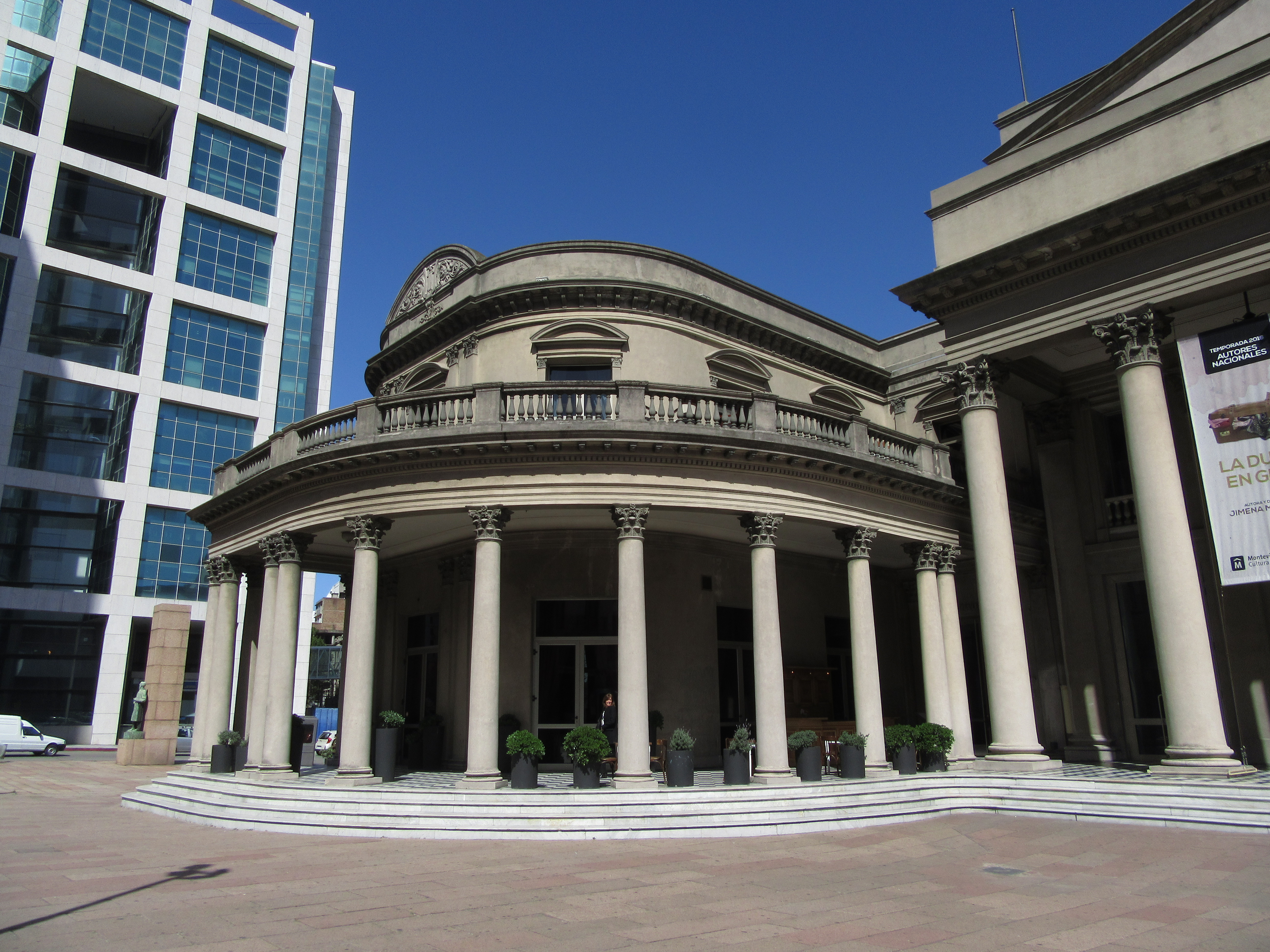
Columns of the facade

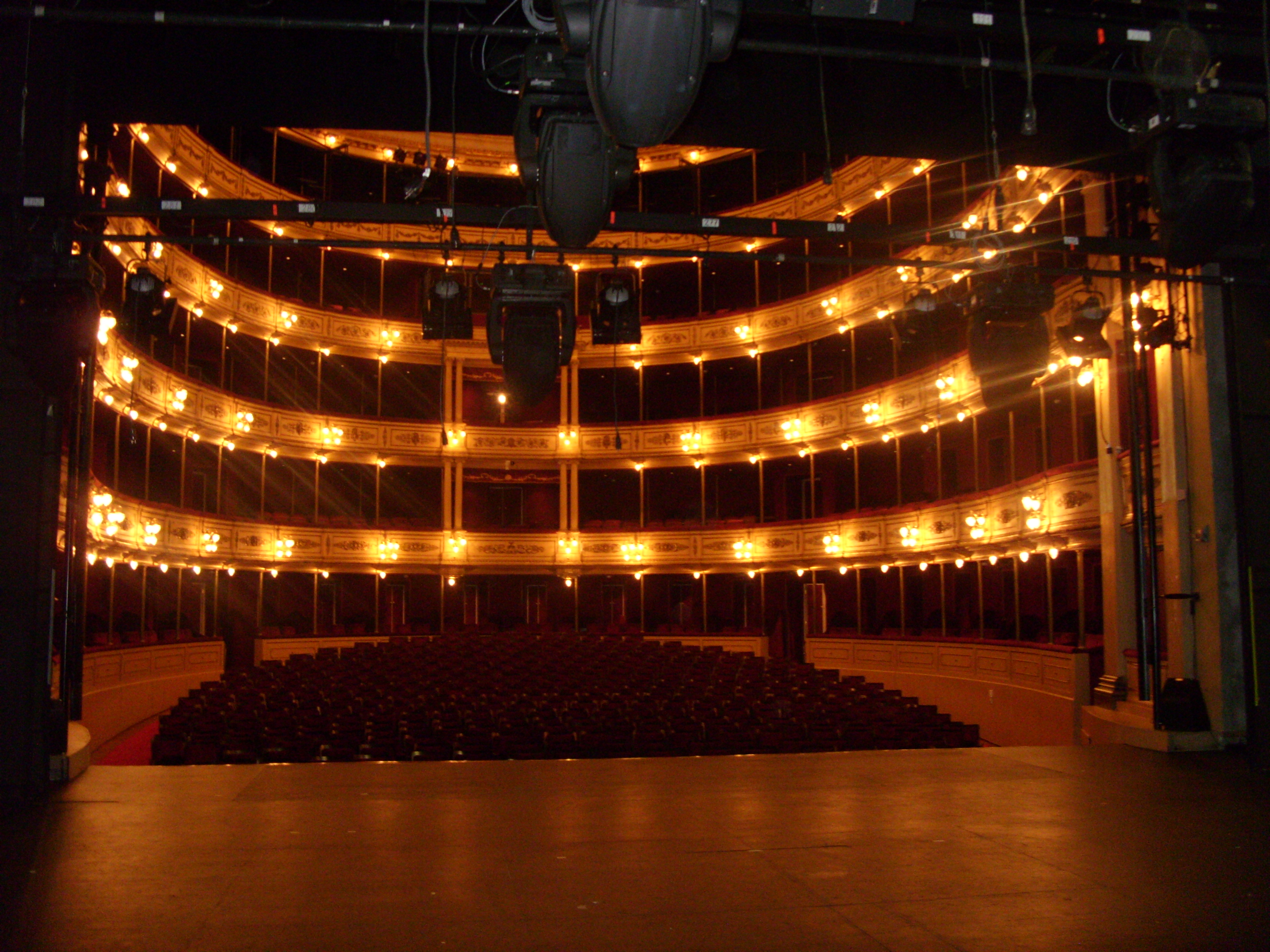
Concert hall

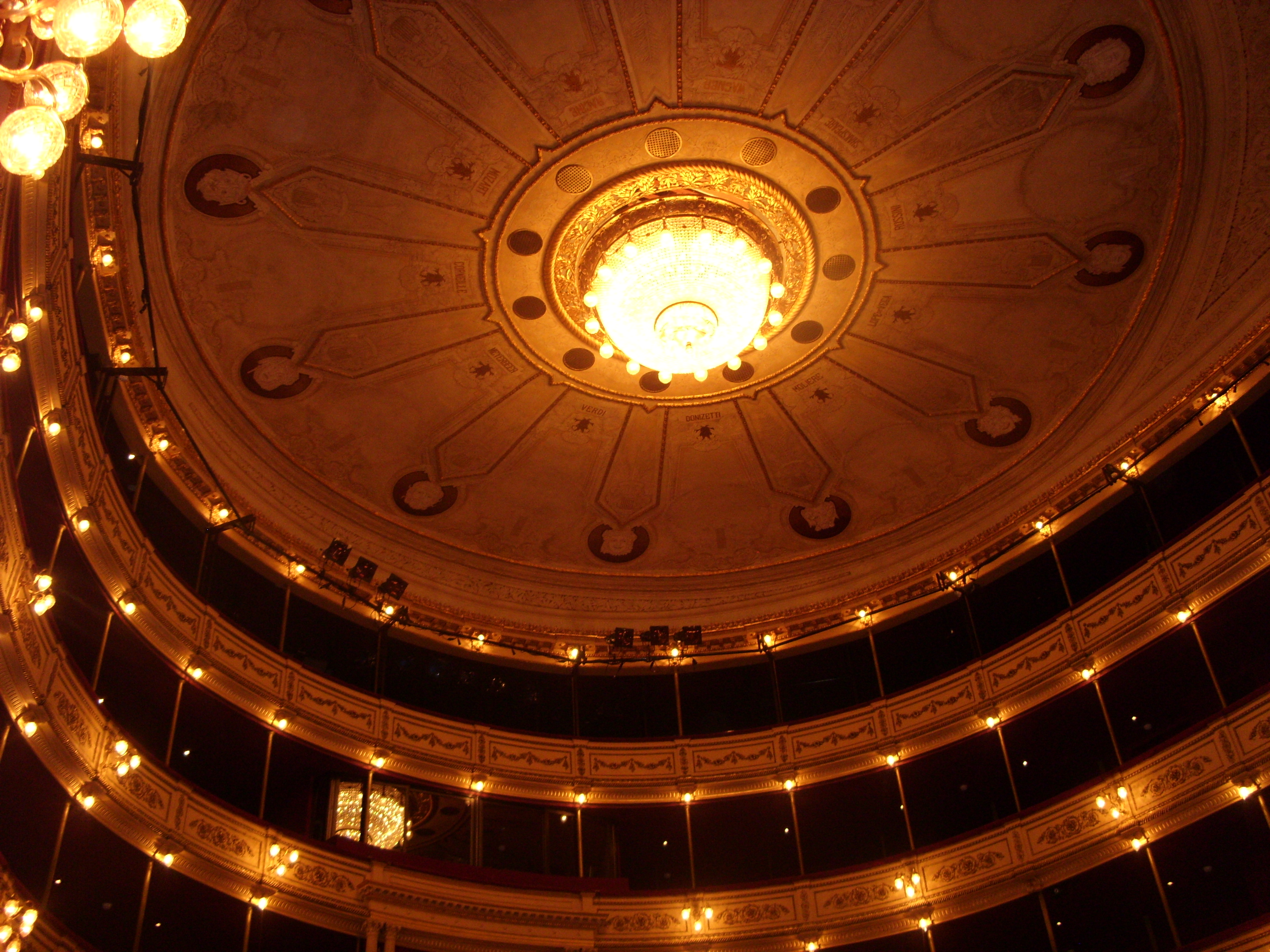
Ceiling

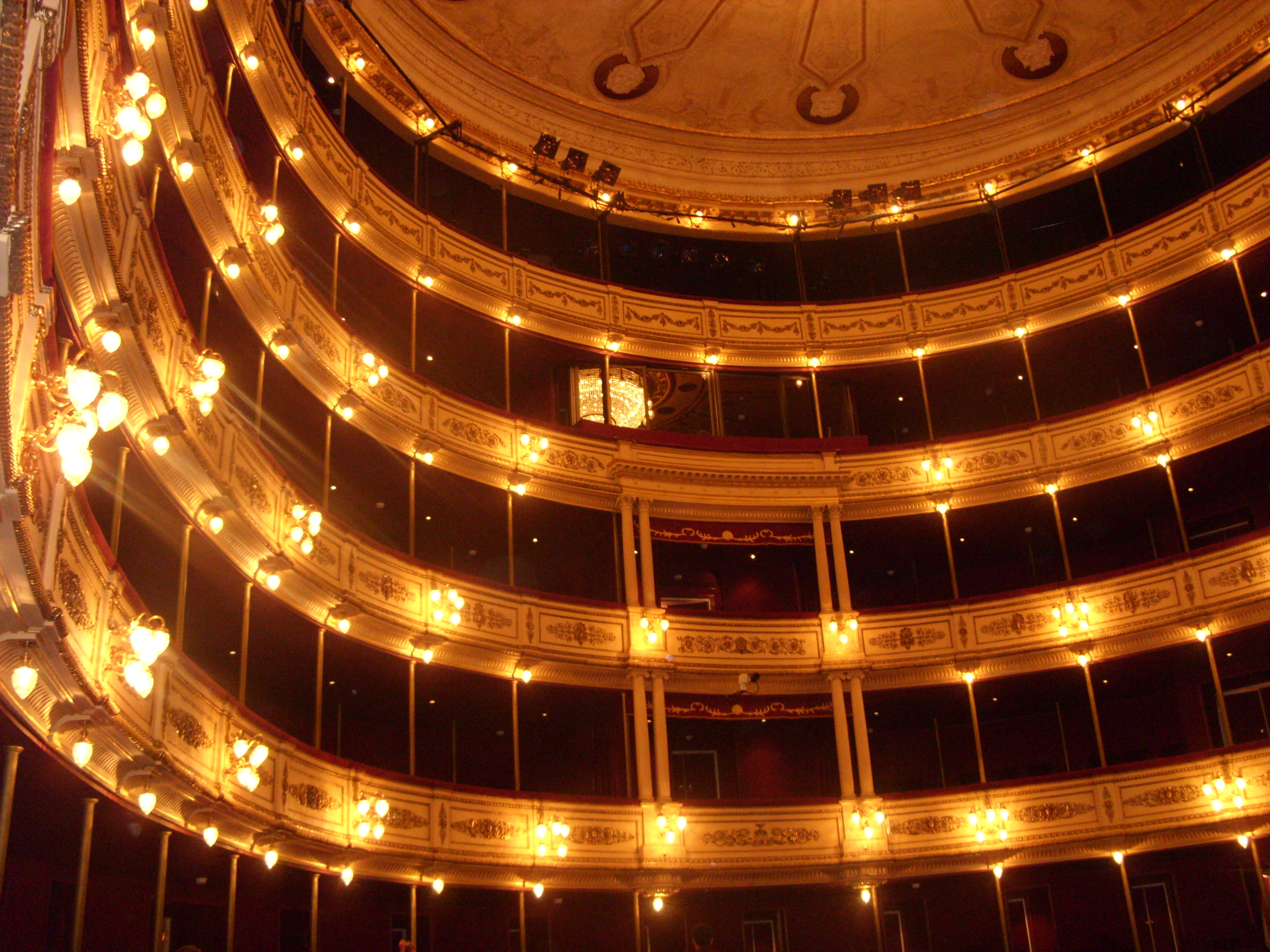
Balconies

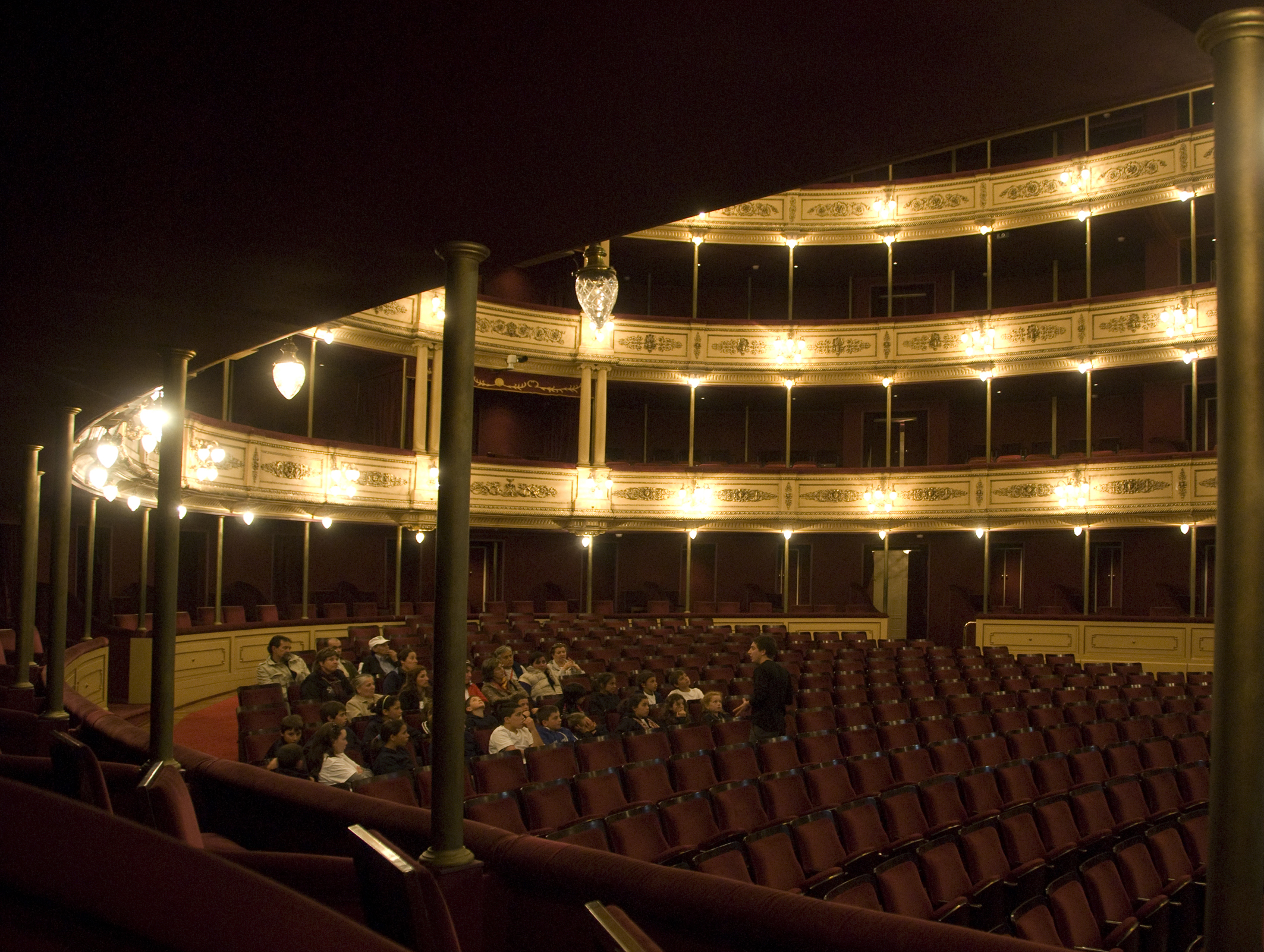
Seats

== See also ==
- Montevideo
- Ciudad Vieja, Montevideo
- Plaza Independencia
- List of music venues in Uruguay
