= Treaty of Aranjuez =

The Treaty of Aranjuez may refer to:

- Treaty of Aranjuez (1752), which recognizes Austrian and Spanish interests in Italy
- Treaty of Aranjuez (1777), by which France and Spain define their colonies in Santo Domingo
- Treaty of Aranjuez (1779), by which Spain joins the American Revolutionary War against Great Britain
- Treaty of Aranjuez (1780), by which Spain cedes territories to Morocco
- Treaty of Aranjuez (1801), which confirms the Third Treaty of San Ildefonso in which Spain returned the colonial territory of Louisiana to France
