= Pietro Guarienti =

Italian painter

Pietro Guarienti (c. 1700–1765) was an Italian painter and art-biographer of the late-Baroque period, active mainly in Bologna, Papal States.

He was born in Verona, Republic of Venice, then traveled to Bologna and Venice. He became the pupil of the painter Giuseppe Maria Crespi and Falcieri. In 1746, he became the godfather of Bernardo Bellotto’s daughter. Bellotto was to become court painter in Dresden in 1748. He was made director of the Dresden art gallery by Frederick Augustus III of Saxony, and is best known for the addenda, specially detailing the stories of the vedutisti he wrote to Pellegrino Antonio Orlandi's Abecedario Pittorico, published in Venice in 1753.
