= Pellegrino Antonio Orlandi =

Italian writer and art historian

- Born: 26 April 1660; Bologna, Papal States
- Died: 18 November 1727 (aged 67); Bologna, Papal States

Academic work
- Discipline: art history
- Institutions: Accademia Clementina
- Notable works: Abecedario pittorico

Pellegrino Antonio Orlandi (1660–1727) was an Italian writer and art historian, author of the Abecedario pittorico ('ABC of Painting').

== Biography ==
Born in Bologna, Orlandi joined the city’s Carmelite convent of San Martino. Here he undertook research in art history and was made a member of the Accademia Clementina.

The first edition of his Abecedario pittorico was published in Bologna in 1704. This was a biographical dictionary covering, according to its author, some four thousand painters, sculptors and architects. An expanded and corrected edition of the Abecedario followed in 1719, updated in part through correspondence with artists and collectors in Rome and Florence. In the meantime, in 1714, he had published the Notizie degli scrittori bolognesi e dell' opere loro stampate e manoscritte (‘Notes on the Bolognese writers and on their printed and manuscript works’).

Pellegrino Antonio Orlandi died in Bologna in 1727. New and augmented editions of the Abecedario continued to be published, however; that of 1753 included additional material written by Pietro Guarienti. Although the work would later be criticised for its inaccuracies, Lanitra Walker describes it in the Dictionary of Art Historians as having been ‘the most complete resource for information on artists during the 18th century.’
