= Giuseppe Zucchi =

Italian engraver

Giuseppe Carlo Zucchi (1721 – 1805) was an Italian engraver.

== Biography ==
Zucchi was born in Venice. He was an older brother of the painter Antonio Zucchi. He studied in Venice with Francesco Zugno. He began working as an assistant to his father, who worked as an engraver, but did not sign pieces himself until after his father's death in 1764. In 1766, he travelled to London with his brother Antonio, and produced four engraved plates for volumes 2 and 3 of Works in Architecture by Robert and James Adam. Returning to Italy in 1779, he became a professor at the Academy of Fine Arts of Rome. His writings include Memorie cronologiche della famiglia (1786) and Memorie istoriche di Maria Angelica Kauffmann Zucchi (1788). These were used by Giovanni Giacomo de Rossi as sources for his 1810 biography of painter Angelica Kauffmann, although Zucchi's 1786 manuscript is not known to have survived. He died in Venice in 1805.
