= Carlo Zucchi (architect) =

Italian architect (1789–1849)

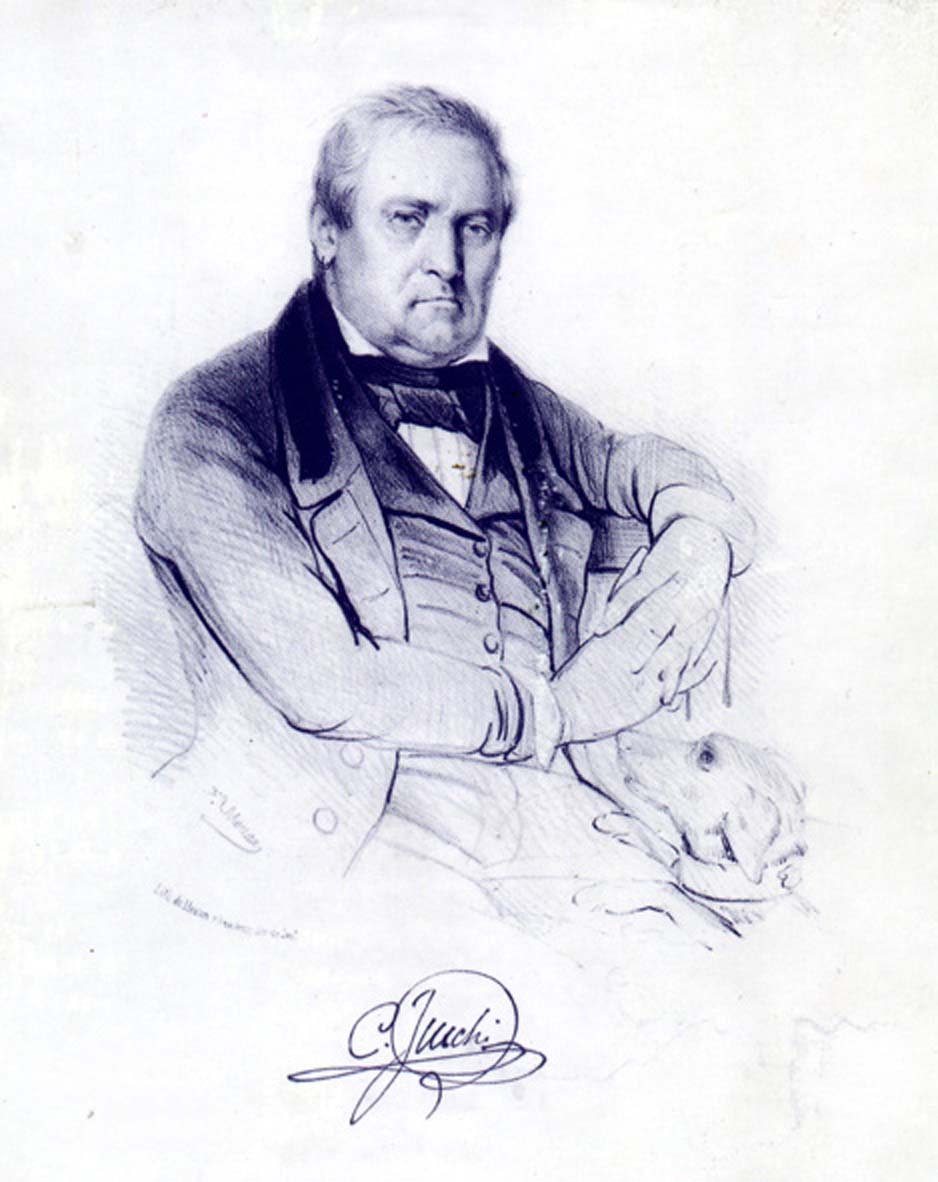
- Born: February 1789; Reggio Emilia, Duchy of Modena and Reggio
- Died: September 9, 1849 (aged 60); Reggio Emilia, Duchy of Modena and Reggio
- Occupation: Painter & architect

Carlo Zucchi (February 1789, in Reggio Emilia – 9 September 1849) was an Italian architect.

A nephew of the namesake Italian general, Zucchi studied in Paris. Later he was active in the River Plate basin.

== Selected works ==
- Mausoleum of Manuel Dorrego, La Recoleta Cemetery
- Façade of the Cathedral of Santa Fe, Argentina
- Façade of the Cathedral of Buenos Aires
- Design of Plaza Independencia, Montevideo, in 1836
- Central Cemetery of Montevideo
- Teatro Solís, Montevideo
- Hospital Maciel (part)
- Church at Coronda, Province of Santa Fe

== Literature ==
- Giuria, Juan (1955). La arquitectura en el Uruguay (in Spanish). Montevideo: Imprenta Universal.
- Lucchini, Aurelio (1986). El Concepto de Arquitectura y su traducción a formas en el territorio que hoy pertenece a Uruguay (in Spanish). Montevideo: Universidad de la República.
- Aliata, Fernando (2009). Carlo Zucchi. Arquitecturas, decoraciones urbanas, monumentos (in Spanish). La Plata: Ediciones al Margen.
