= Carlo Zucchi (general) =

Italian general

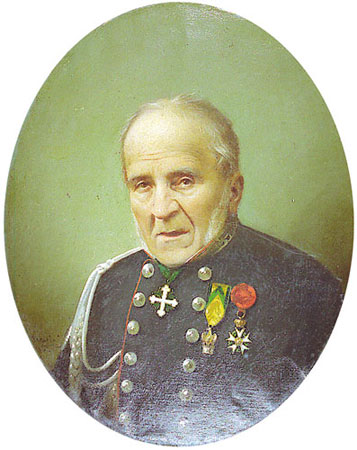
- Born: 10 March 1777; Reggio Emilia, Duchy of Modena and Reggio
- Died: 19 December 1863 (aged 86); Reggio Emilia, Italy
- Military career
- Allegiance: Kingdom of Italy (1798–1815); United Italian Provinces (1831)
- Rank: Brigadier general
- Conflicts: War of the Second Coalition; War of the Fourth Coalition; War of the Fifth Coalition; Battle of Raab; War of the Sixth Coalition; Battle of Mincio; Battle of the Cells (1831)
- Awards: Legion d'Honneur

Carlo Zucchi (Reggio Emilia, 10 March 1777 – Reggio Emilia, 19 December 1863), was an Italian general and patriot, who served in the Kingdom of Italy and later in the Papal State. He played an active role in the Risorgimento. His namesake nephew was a notable architect.

== Biography ==
First seeing action as a sub lieutenant of a battalion of volunteers in the 1796 Italian Campaign, Zucchi rose steadily through the ranks, serving as a Colonel under Eugene de Beauharnais in the 1809 campaign, being made General de Brigade and Inspector General of the Infantry of the Kingdom of Italy. In 1812 he served in the XI Corps of the Grande Armée, commanding a brigade sent to join army in Russia, late November. In 1813 he was dispatched to oversee the cavalry reserves being organised in Italy, then returned to the field to lead a brigade of Gérard's 35th Division in Macdonald's XI Corps. He served at the action of Seyfersdorf 5 May, the capture of Lahn 18 August, Niederau 23rd and the battle of the Katzbach on the 26th. He was then at the Battle of Leipzig 18 Oct. In 1814 he commanded the 6ème Division of the Armée d’Italie under Eugene de Beauharnais.

In 1821 he was arrested for his part in the Italian risings against Austria, and in the 1829 risings he commanded the revolutionary forces of the Duchies and Papal States, being arrested again in 1831. On 4 June 1832 an Austrian military commission sentenced Zucchi to the death penalty, later commuted to twenty years of fortress imprisonment following the intervention of the French court.

Initially in solitary confinement in the fortress of Palmanova, in 1840 he was transferred to Josephstadt, and in 1848 was liberated by the revolutionary forces, of which he again took command and from which he rejected the imperial siege of Palmanova with about 1,440 fighters between regulars and volunteers. In October-November 1848 he was Pius IX's last minister of arms as a constitutional sovereign. In the 1859 uprising he again volunteered for Piedmont and served as Lieutenant General.

His Memorie del generale Carlo Zucchi were edited by Bianchi, and published in 1861.
