= Francesco Sabatini =

Italian architect

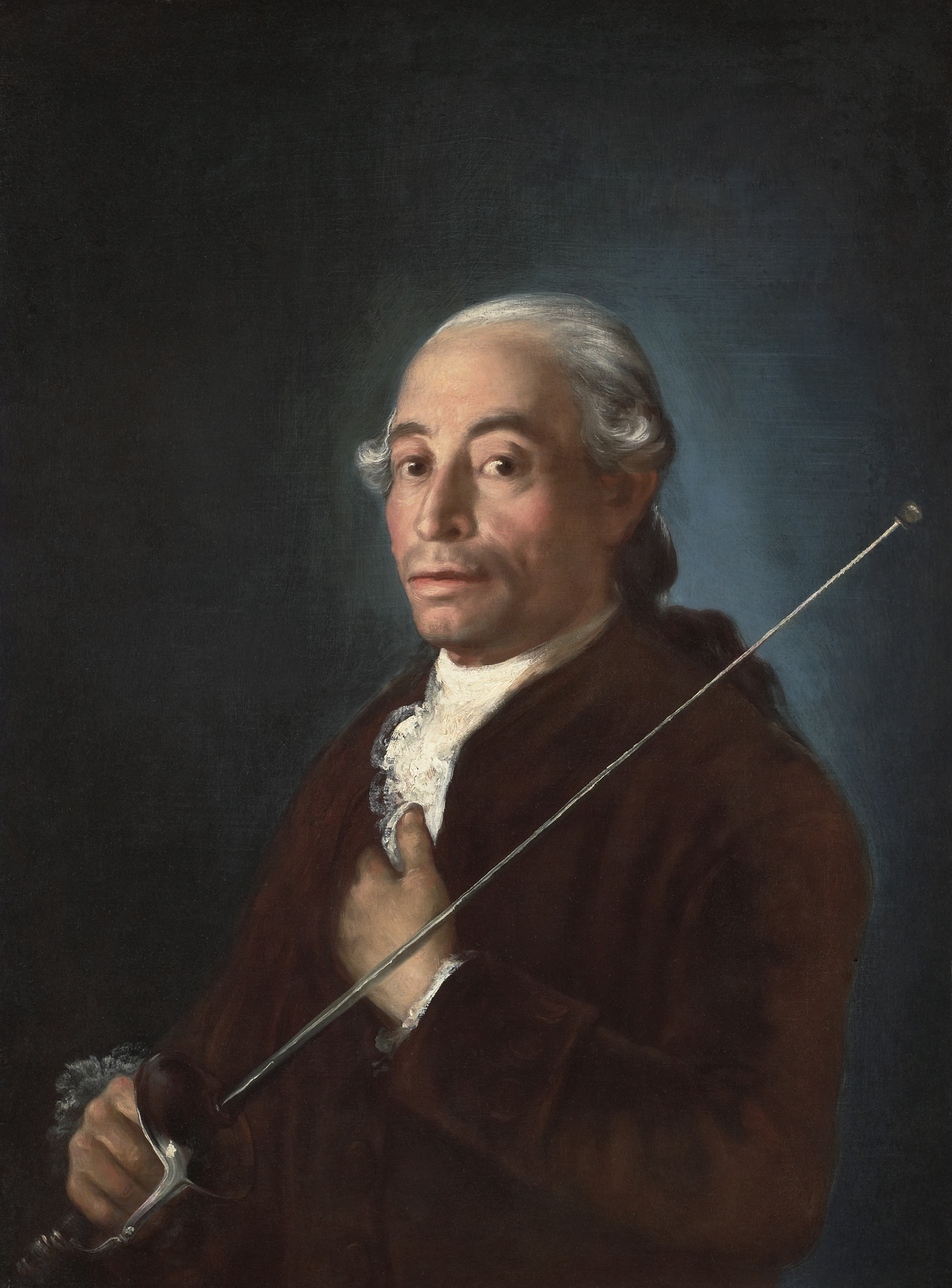
Francesco Sabatini by Goya, c. 1775–79.

Francesco Sabatini (1721 – 19 February 1797), also known as Francisco Sabatini, was an Italian architect who worked in Spain.

== Biography ==
Born in Palermo, he studied architecture in Rome. His first contact with the Spanish monarchy occurred when he participated in the construction of the Palace of Caserta for the King of Naples, Charles VII, the future King Charles III of Spain. When he was raised to the Spanish throne, he called Sabatini to Madrid in 1760, where he was positioned above the most outstanding Spanish architects of the time. He was appointed as Great Master of Royal Works, with the rank of lieutenant colonel at the Engineers Corps, simultaneously designated also as an honorary academician of the Academia Real de Bellas Artes de San Fernando.

Sabatini's works are all encompassed within the neoclassical tradition, but he was not inspired fundamentally by ancient Greece and Rome, but by Italian Renaissance architecture.

His talent as an architect and the king's support resulted in many commissions and professional recognition. He was promoted to lieutenant general of the Engineers Corps, was granted the degree of Knight of the Order of Santiago, and had direct access to the innermost royal circle after his designation as gentilhombre de camara (Gentleman of the Royal Chamber).

The Sabatini Gardens (located in front of the north facade of the Royal Palace of Madrid, between the Calle de Bailén and the hill of San Vicente) were not designed by him; they were created in the 1930s on the site formerly occupied by the stables constructed by Sabatini.

Furthermore, Sabatini was responsible for building the Arms Factory of Toledo, the headquarters for the Walloon Guards in Leganés (presently part of the Charles III University of Madrid), a convent in Valladolid (Santa Ana) and another one in Granada (Comendadoras of Santiago) and the well-known Chapel of the Immaculate in the Burgo de Osma Cathedral.

He died in Madrid on February 19, 1797.

== Works ==
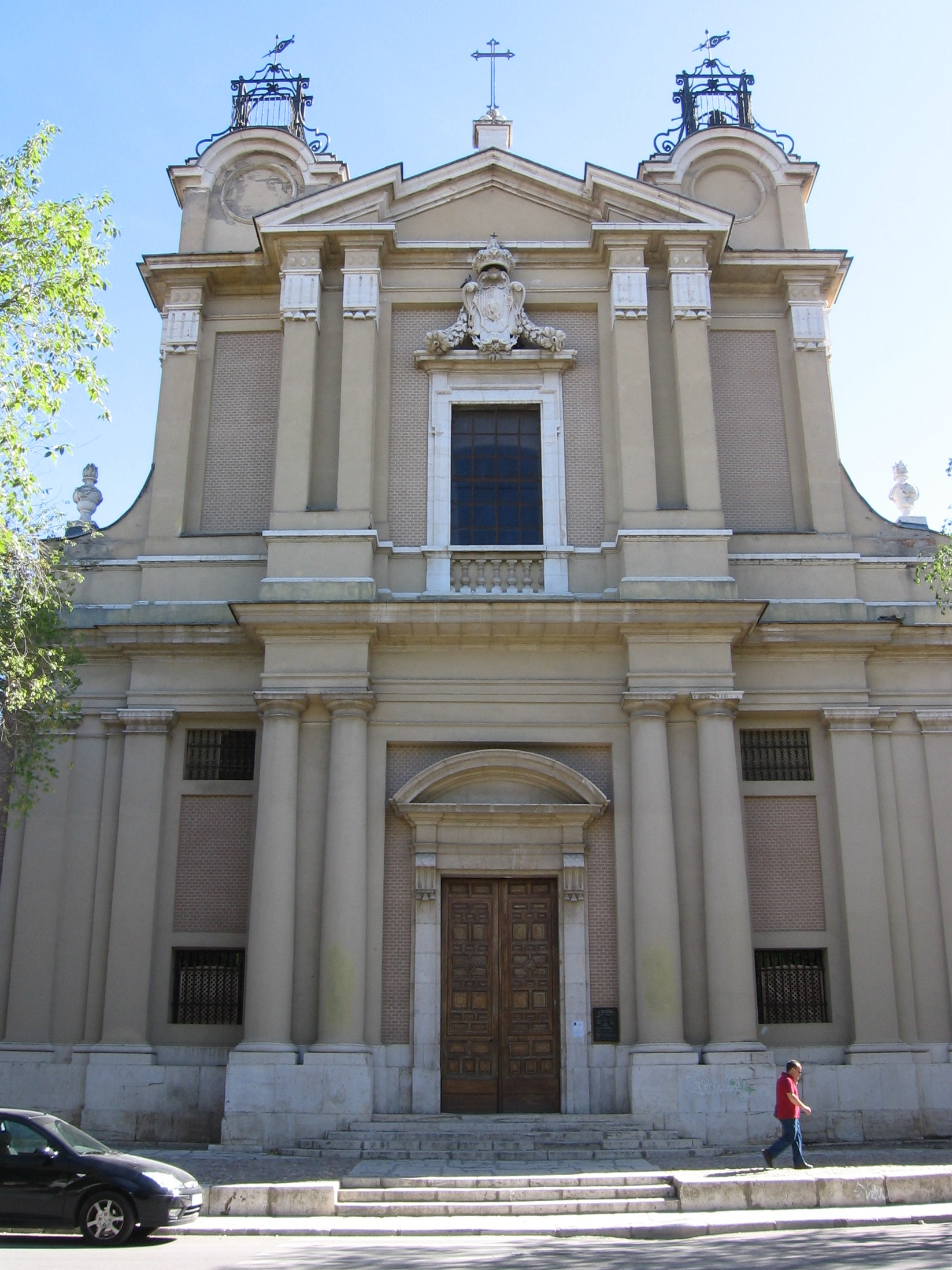
Convent of San Pascual, at Aranjuez.

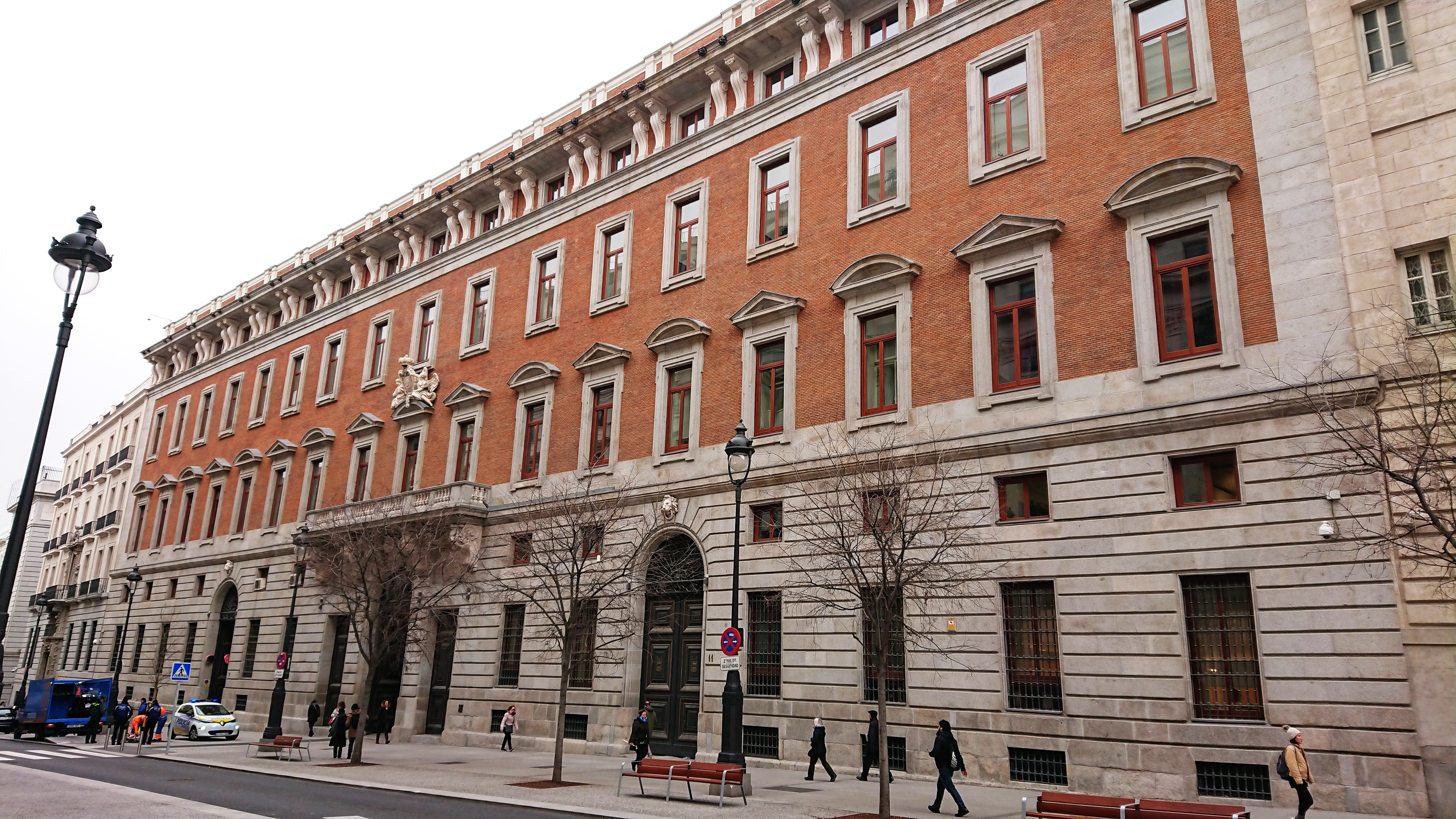
Royal Customs House, Madrid

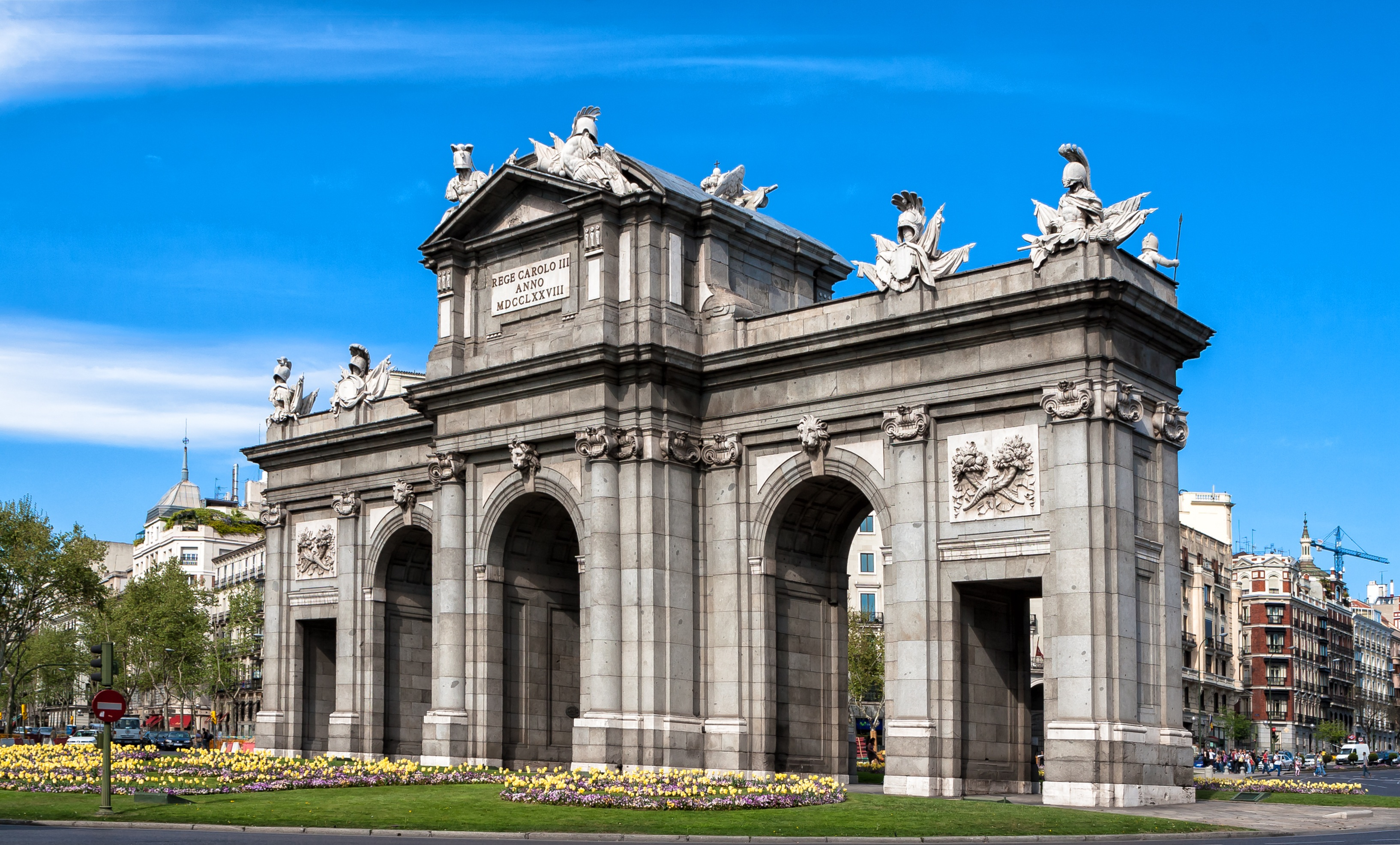
Alcalá Gate, Madrid

Among his numerous works, the most important were:

- The main staircase and other works in the Royal Palace of Madrid (1760–1764).
- Planning of the sewage system of Madrid, which was paved with stones and cleaned (1761–1765) for the urban reform of the city of Madrid.
- Royal Customs House in the Alcala Street (1761–1769), present seat of the Ministry of Property.
- Tombs of Ferdinand VI of Spain and Bárbara de Braganza, located in the Church of Santa Barbara of the Convent of the Salesas Reales, with Francisco Gutiérrez Arribas.
- Convent of San Pascual, in Aranjuez (1765–1770).
- Renovation of Cuesta de San Vicente (1767–1777).
- Prolongation of the Southeastern wing of the Royal Palace begins (1772).
- Reconstruction of the monastery of the Comendadoras of Santiago (1773).
- Alcalá Gate (1774–1778).
- Direction of works of the Basilica of San Francisco el Grande (1774–1784).
- Puerta de San Vicente in Madrid (1775).
- Casa de los Secretarios de Estado y del Despacho, also known as the Palace of the Marquess de Grimaldi and Palace of Godoy (1776).
- Continuation of the works of the General Hospital that José de Hermosilla had initiated (1776–1781) during the reign of Ferdinand VI (at the present time the Museo Nacional Centro de Arte Reina Sofía)
- Convent of Franciscan of San Gil in the Prado de Leganitos (1786–1797), recently transformed by Manuel Martín Rodriguez.
- Change of the direction of the main stairs of the Royal Palace by desire of Charles IV of Spain.
- Reconstruction of the Plaza Mayor de Madrid after the 1790 fire, together with Juan de Villanueva.
- The project of creating a military base in Leganés. Sabatini planned Cuartel de Saboya's construction. However, the person in charge of building this military complex was José de Hermosilla, who finished it in 1783. Currently, this place belongs to the Charles III University of Madrid.
