= Real Casa de la Aduana =

- Real Casa de la Aduana (Spanish)
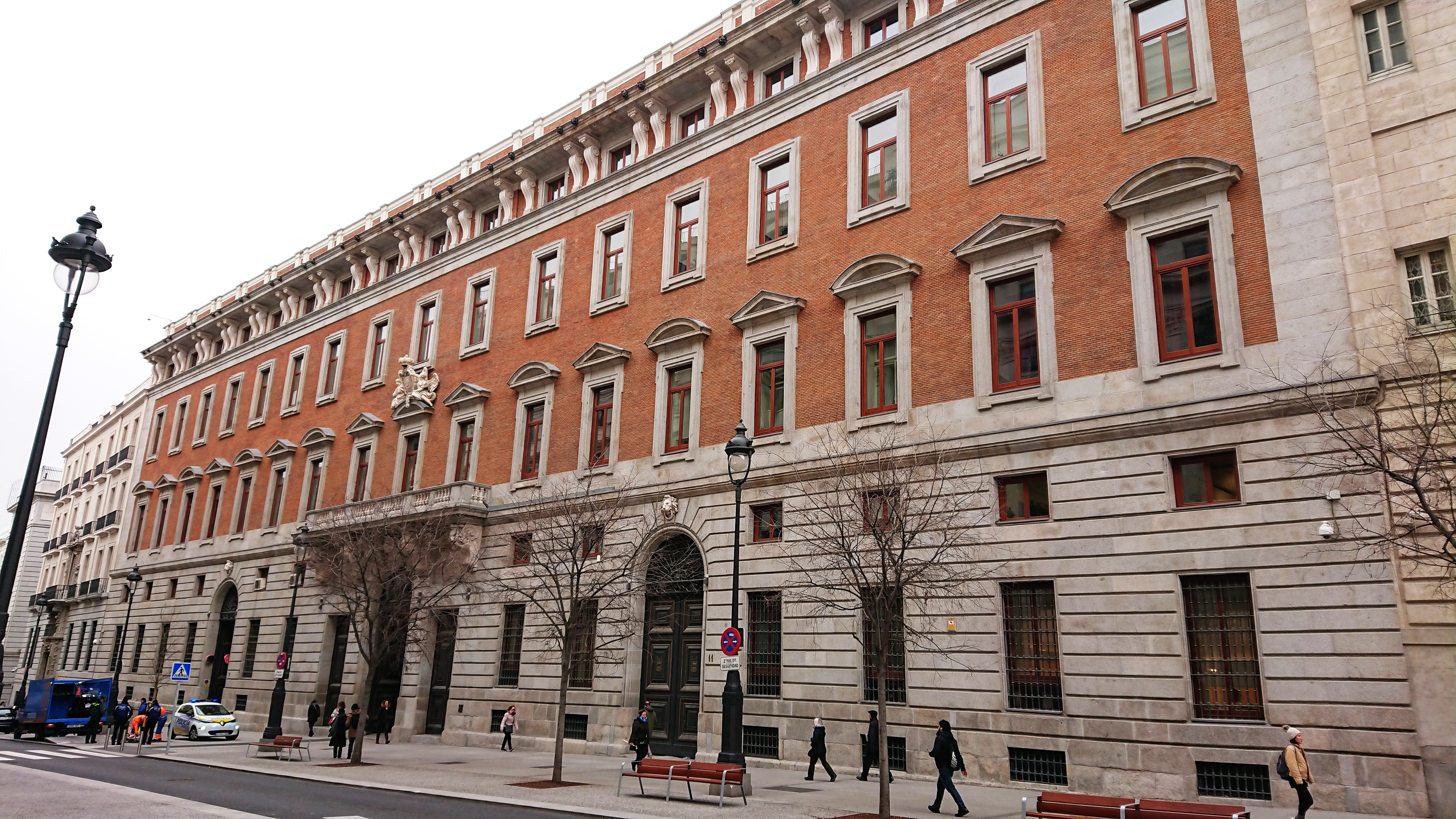

- Location within Spain
- 40.417281°N 3.701827°W
- Location: Madrid, Spain

Site notes
- Architect: Francesco Sabatini

Spanish Cultural Heritage
- Official name: Real Casa de la Aduana
- Type: Non-movable
- Criteria: Monument
- Designated: 1998
- Reference no.: RI-51-0010190

The Real Casa de la Aduana (Spanish: Real Casa de la Aduana, meaning "royal customs house") is the headquarters of Spain's Ministry of Economy and Ministry of the Treasury. It is located on Madrid's longest street, the Calle de Alcalá.

The eighteenth-century building has been modified over the years. It was declared Bien de Interés Cultural in 1998.
