= San Antonio de Padua, Aranjuez =

Cultural property in Aranjuez, Spain

Church of San Antonio
- Iglesia de San Antonio (Spanish)
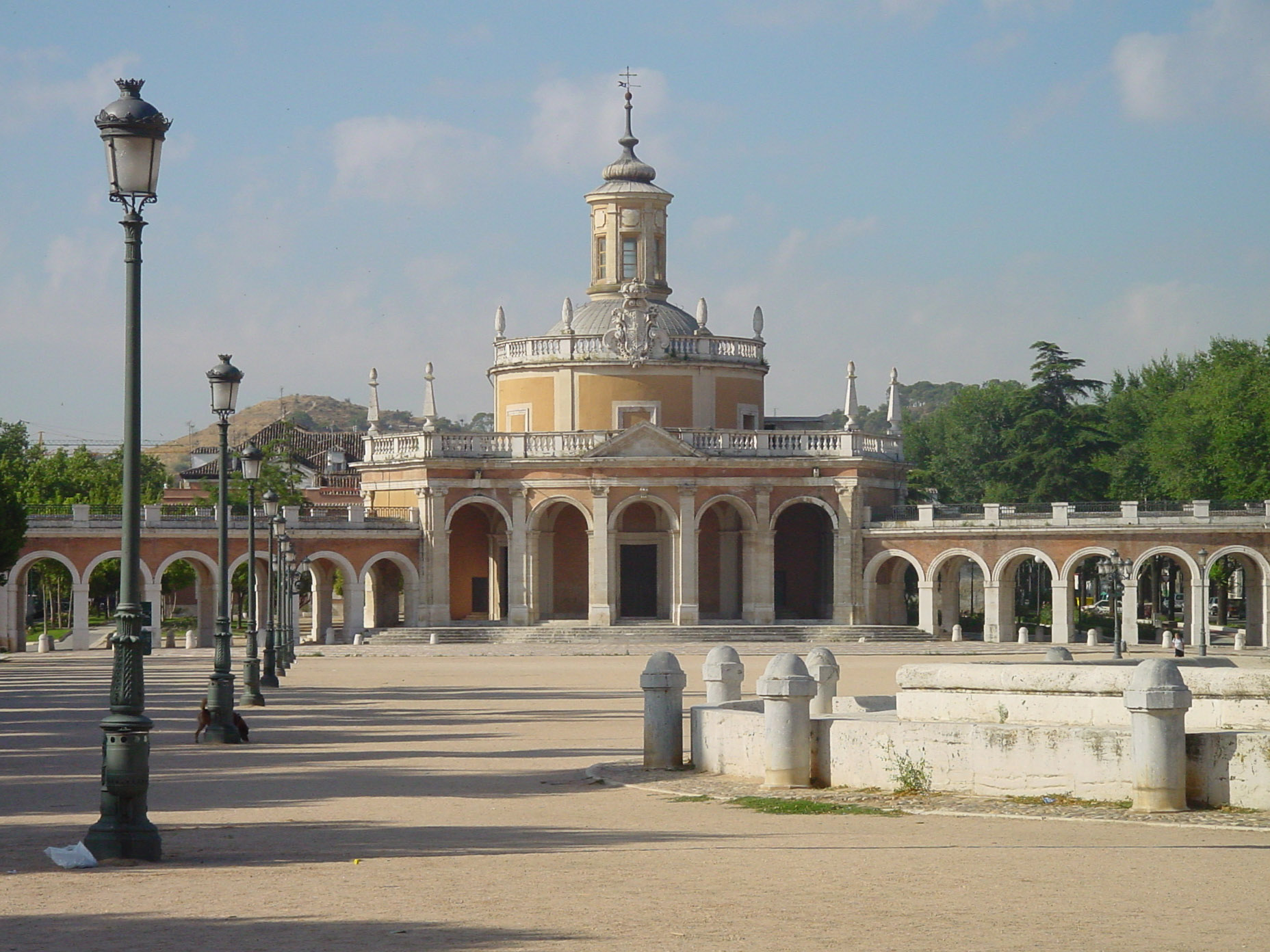

- Location within Spain
- 40.033409°N 3.605652°W
- Location: Aranjuez, Community of Madrid, Spain

Spanish Cultural Heritage
- Official name: Iglesia de San Antonio
- Type: Non-movable
- Criteria: Monument
- Designated: 2003
- Reference no.: RI-51-0010919

The Church of San Antonio (Spanish: Iglesia de San Antonio de Padua) is a church located in Aranjuez, in the Community of Madrid, Spain. It was declared Bien de Interés Cultural and a World Heritage Site by UNESCO within Aranjuez Cultural Landscape in 2003.

== Description ==
Ferdinand VI of Spain built a chapel dedicated to Saint Anthony of Padua as an Oratorio to replace an earlier private chapel constructed during the reign of Philip IV of Spain. It stands on the south side of a large parade square known as 'Mariblanca' which leads into the courtyard of Royal Palace known as Plaza de Parejas. This new building, designed by Santiago Bonavía around 1752 would serve the people as well as the Monarchy. Charles III of Spain enlarged the chapel, incorporating a large square cupola with a gable roof.

The church consists of a central circular structure with a grand north-facing portico entrance facade of five white limestone arches decorated with Tuscan pilasters. A gallery of a further five arches on either side of this join the central church portico with the complementary style of the smaller red-brick arched walkways of the Casa de Infantes to the east and Casa de los Cabeleros (knights) to the west enclosing the renamed Plaza de San Antonio on three sides.

The body of the church is circular divided vertically into two levels, each with stone balustrades, one to cap the first-floor level forming a terrace, highlighting the main central circular domed roof which is crowned with a glazed pinnacle.

This information is in the public domain thanks to a declaration of cultural significance published in the official bulletin of Spain on 18 January 2003.
