= Convento de San Pascual, Aranjuez =

Cultural property in Aranjuez, Spain

Convent of San Pascual
- Convento de San Pascual (Spanish)
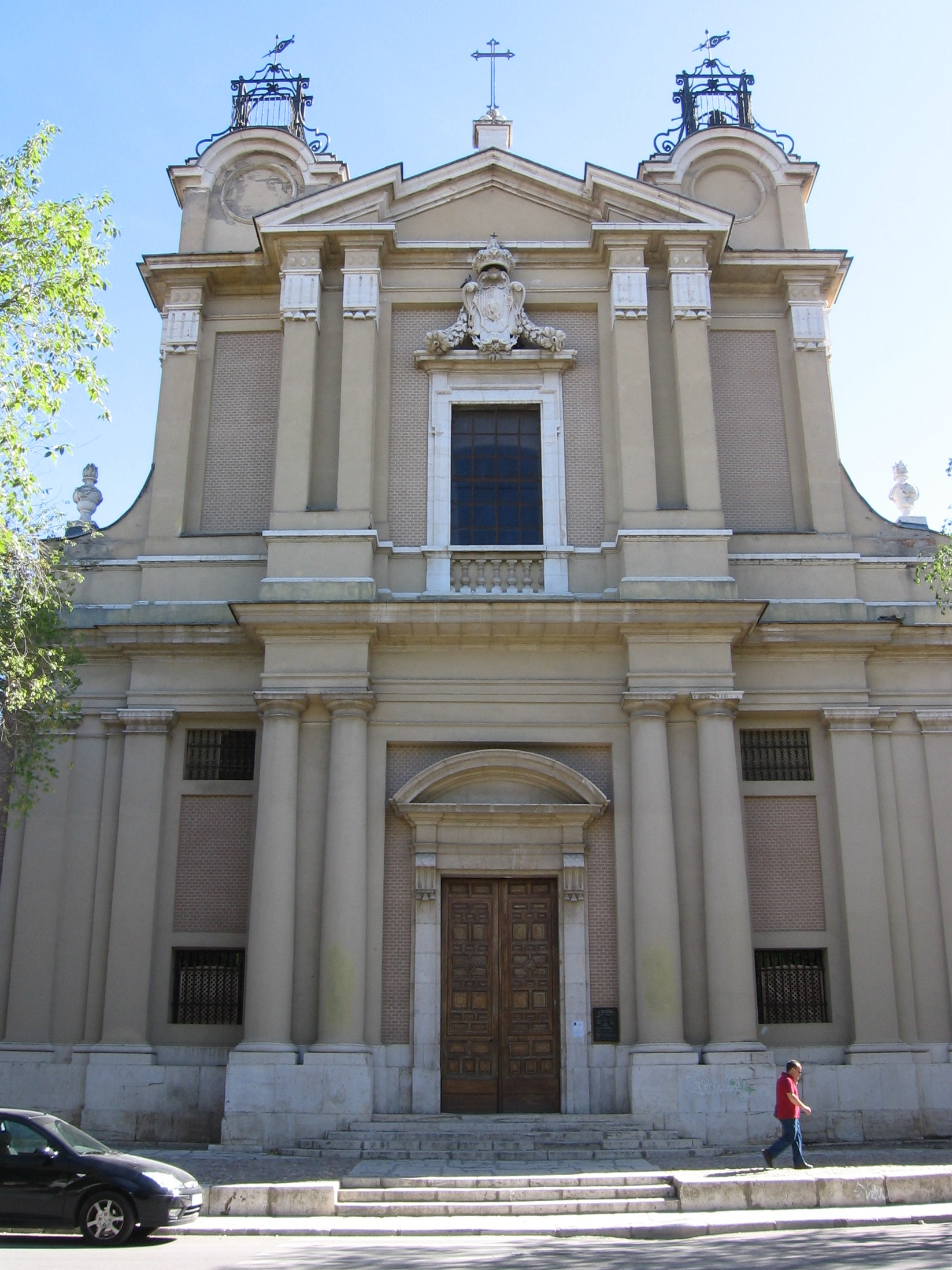

- Location within Spain
- 40.031953°N 3.600153°W
- Location: Aranjuez, Spain

Site notes
- Architect: Francesco Sabatini

Spanish Cultural Heritage
- Official name: Convento de San Pascual
- Type: Non-movable
- Criteria: Monument
- Designated: 1999
- Reference no.: RI-51-0010465

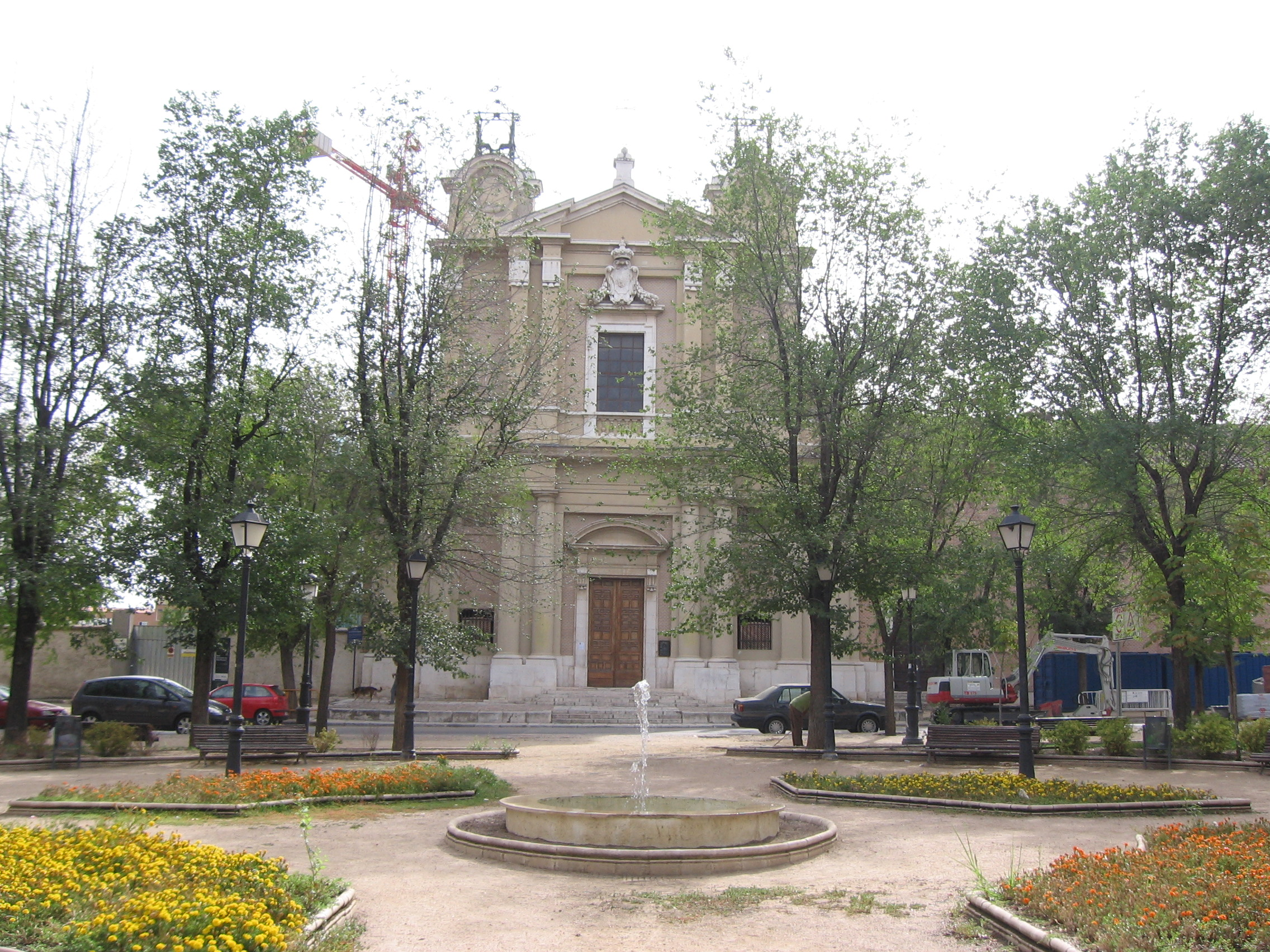
Convent of San Pascual

The Convento de San Pascual is a royal monastery in Aranjuez, in the Community of Madrid, Spain, founded by King Charles III of Spain as a Franciscan monastery and built from 1765 to 1770. Under the reign of Isabel II of Spain, it was assigned to the Conceptionist nuns, and now is under the administration of the Patrimonio Nacional.

The architect was the Italian Francesco Sabatini. The main altar has a painting by Anton Raphael Mengs.

It was declared Bien de Interés Cultural in 1999.
