= Aranjuez =

- Municipality
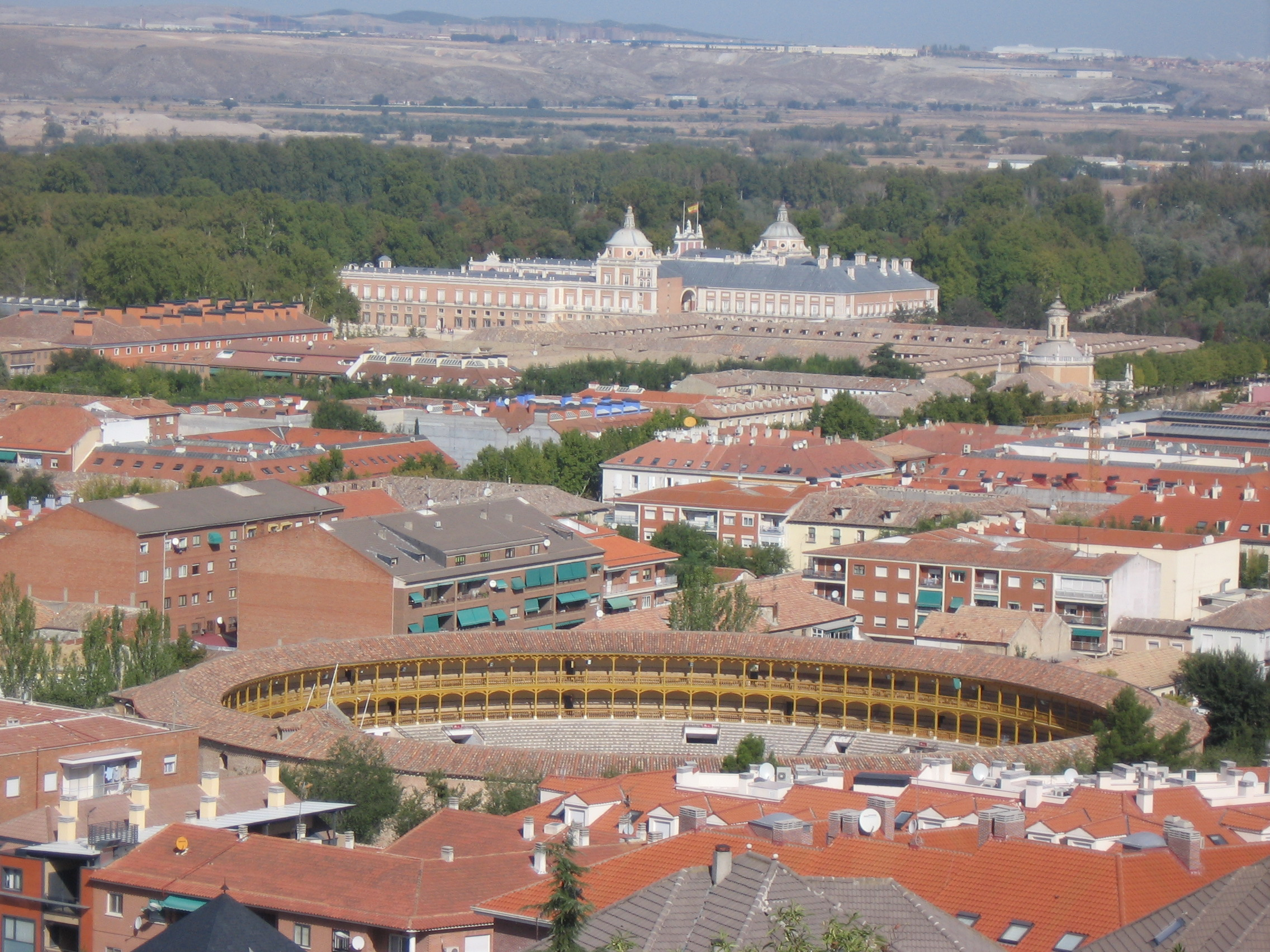
- The Royal Palace and the Bullring of Aranjuez seen from El Mirador Housing Estate Hill

- Flag Coat of arms
- Interactive map of Aranjuez
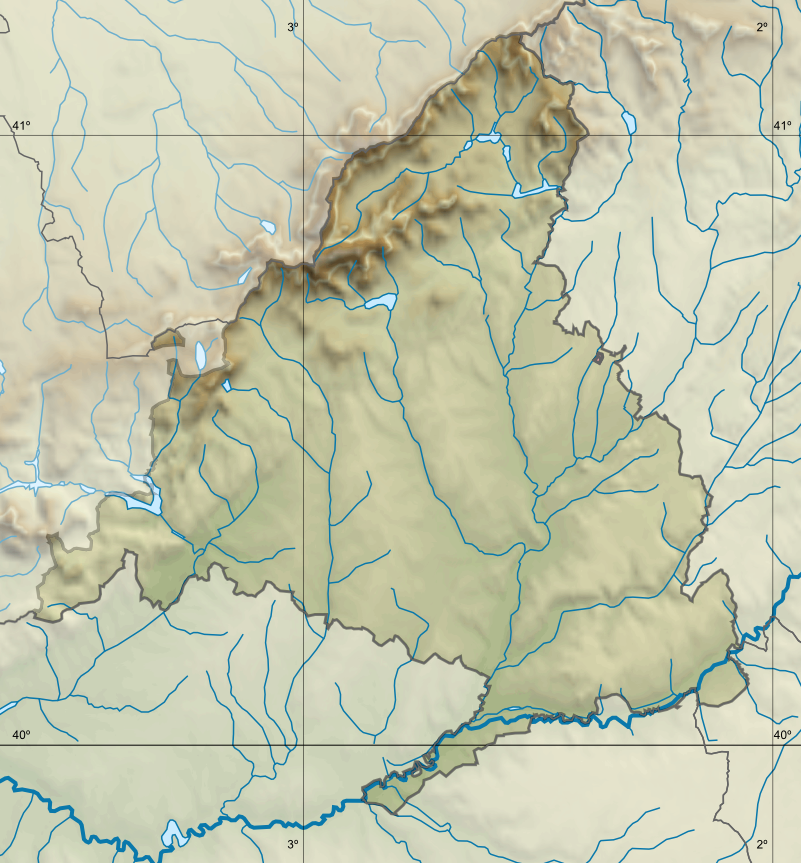
- Location within Community of Madrid Location within Spain
- Coordinates: 40°02′00″N 3°36′10″W
- Country: Spain
- Autonomous Community: Community of Madrid

Government
  - Type: Ayuntamiento
  - Body: Ayuntamiento de Aranjuez
  - Mayor: Miguel Gómez Herrero (PP)

Area
  - Total: 201.11 km^{2} (77.65 sq mi)
- Elevation: 495 m (1,624 ft)

Population (2025-01-01)
  - Total: 63,040
  - Density: 313.5/km^{2} (811.9/sq mi)
- Demonyms: Ribereño -a, arancentano -a
- Website: aranjuez.es

UNESCO World Heritage Site
- Official name: Aranjuez Cultural Landscape
- Criteria: ii, iv
- Reference: 1044
- Inscription: 2001 (25th Session)

Aranjuez (Spanish: [aɾaŋˈxweθ]) is a city and municipality of Spain, part of the Community of Madrid.

Located in the southern end of the region, the main urban nucleus lies on the left bank of the Tagus, a bit upstream of the discharge of the Jarama. As of 2022, the municipality has a registered population of 59,762. Aranjuez became one of the Royal Estates of the Crown of Spain in 1560, during the reign of Philip II. Until 1752, only royalty and nobility were allowed to dwell in the town.

The cultural landscape of Aranjuez was declared a World Heritage Site by UNESCO in 2001.

== Name ==
There are several theories about the origin of the name. The most widely accepted one states that it comes from Basque and derives it from arantza ("hawthorn" in English). Another theory, attributed to Padre Martín Sarmiento, a Benedictine scholar who lived about a century after the founder of Aranjuez, Philip II of Spain, claims the origin to be from Latin Ara Jovis or Ara Iovia, which means the altar of the Roman god Jupiter. However the pre-Roman derivation is generally preferred.

== History ==
=== Early history ===
Alfonso VI took control of the territory near the Tagus, including Aranjuez, after the 1085 conquest of the Taifa of Toledo. During the 12th century, Aranjuez (then known as Aranz, Aranzuel, Aranzuegue or Almuzundica) was a small hamlet under the influence of the castle of Oreja. Following the 1108 defeat of Castilian and Leonese forces by the Almoravids at Uclés, the area fell under Muslim control. Aurelia (Oreja) was retaken by Alfonso VII, the Emperor after the 1194 surrender of the besieged castle. Alfonso VIII donated Oreja and its dependent hamlets in 1171 to the Order of Santiago and its Grand Master Pedro Fernández. Aranjuez was definitively secured in 1178.

Aranjuez was chosen as seat of the Mesa Maestral ("Master's Table") of the Order of Santiago in 1272. The link between Aranjuez and the Crown dates from 1493, when the Catholic Monarchs became administrators of the military orders. Pope Adrian VI confirmed Emperor Charles V in the everlasting dignity as Grand Master of the Order in 1523. The dehesa of Aranjuez subsequently became a Crown property.

=== Development as Royal Site ===
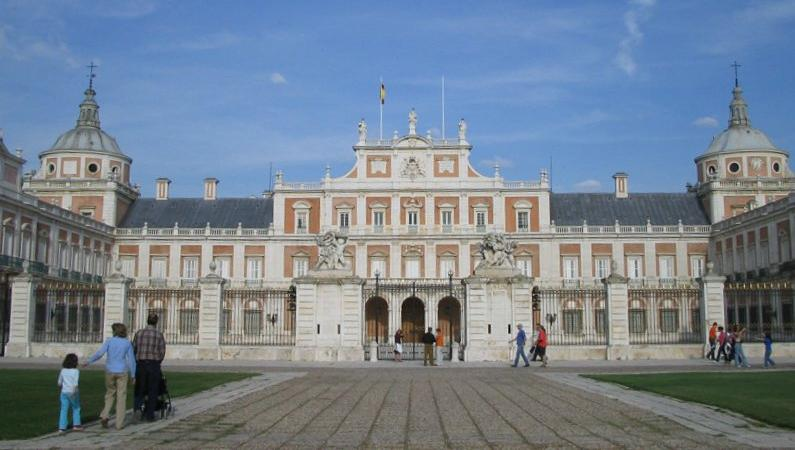
Royal Palace of Aranjuez

Philip II declared the place a Royal Site in 1560. In the second half of the 16th century, the royal palace was constructed and the name of the enlarged settlement was changed from Alpajes to Aranjuez. The site was initially designed by Juan Bautista de Toledo and completed by Juan de Herrera. Aranjuez was extensively redesigned in the 18th century by Santiago Bonavía.

In 1752, during the reign of Ferdinand VI, Aranjuez, which was previously reserved for the royal family, nobles of the royal court and palace servants started to be opened providing overnight accommodation for visitors, who had previously been obliged to lodge in nearby settlements such as Ocaña.

The weir in the Tagus River which is alongside to the Royal Palace of Aranjuez was constructed in 1753 to power a water wheel for milling wheat flour. Since the mill was visible from the palace, it was architecturally attractive and sometimes used as the residence of the town governor.

King Carlos III built the so-called Long Bridge (about 300m long) over the Jarama in 1761.

In 1763 Charles III, a keen physiocrat ordered the construction of Real Cortijo de San Isidro, a model farm which was abandoned by his successor (his second son, Charles IV of Spain) and later commercialized. Two years later the king ordered the construction of the Franciscan Convent of San Pascual, later occupied by the Conceptionists.

The French architect Jaime Marquet began construction of the theatre Coliseum Carlos III in 1767.

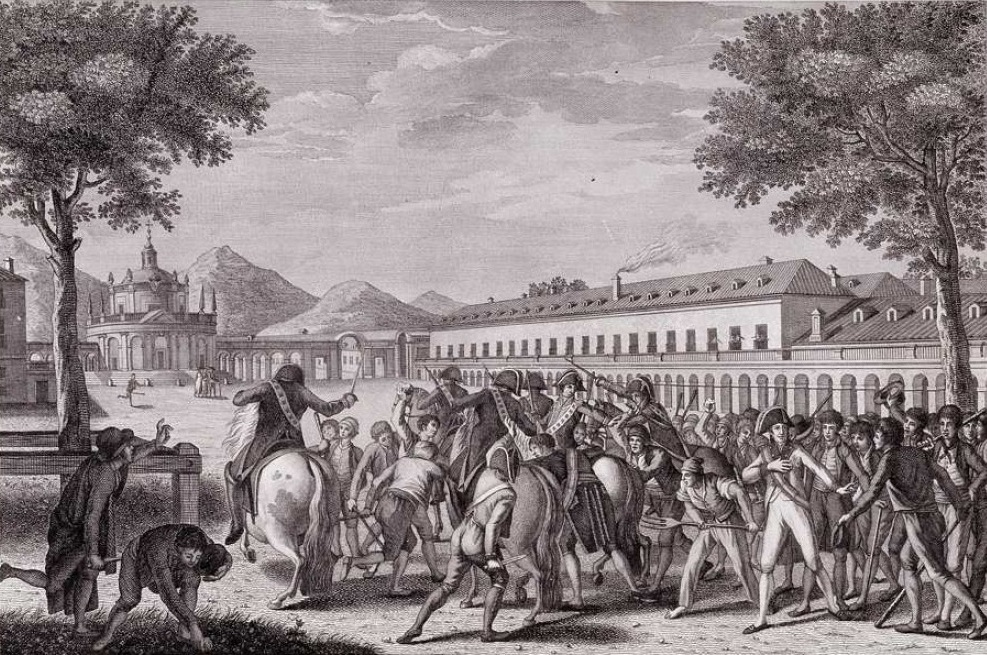
Fall and imprisonment of the Prince of Peace (1808 Mutiny of Aranjuez) by Francisco de Paula Martí and Zacarías Velázquez in 1814.

An uprising, the so-called Mutiny of Aranjuez, took place on 17 March 1808 when the royal family and the government were staying at Aranjuez on their way south, as they were anticipating a French invasion from the north. Soldiers, peasants and members of the general public assaulted Manuel Godoy's quarters and captured him. The mutineers made Charles dismiss Godoy, and two days later, the court forced the King himself to abdicate in favour of his son and rival, who became Ferdinand VII.

=== Late modern history ===
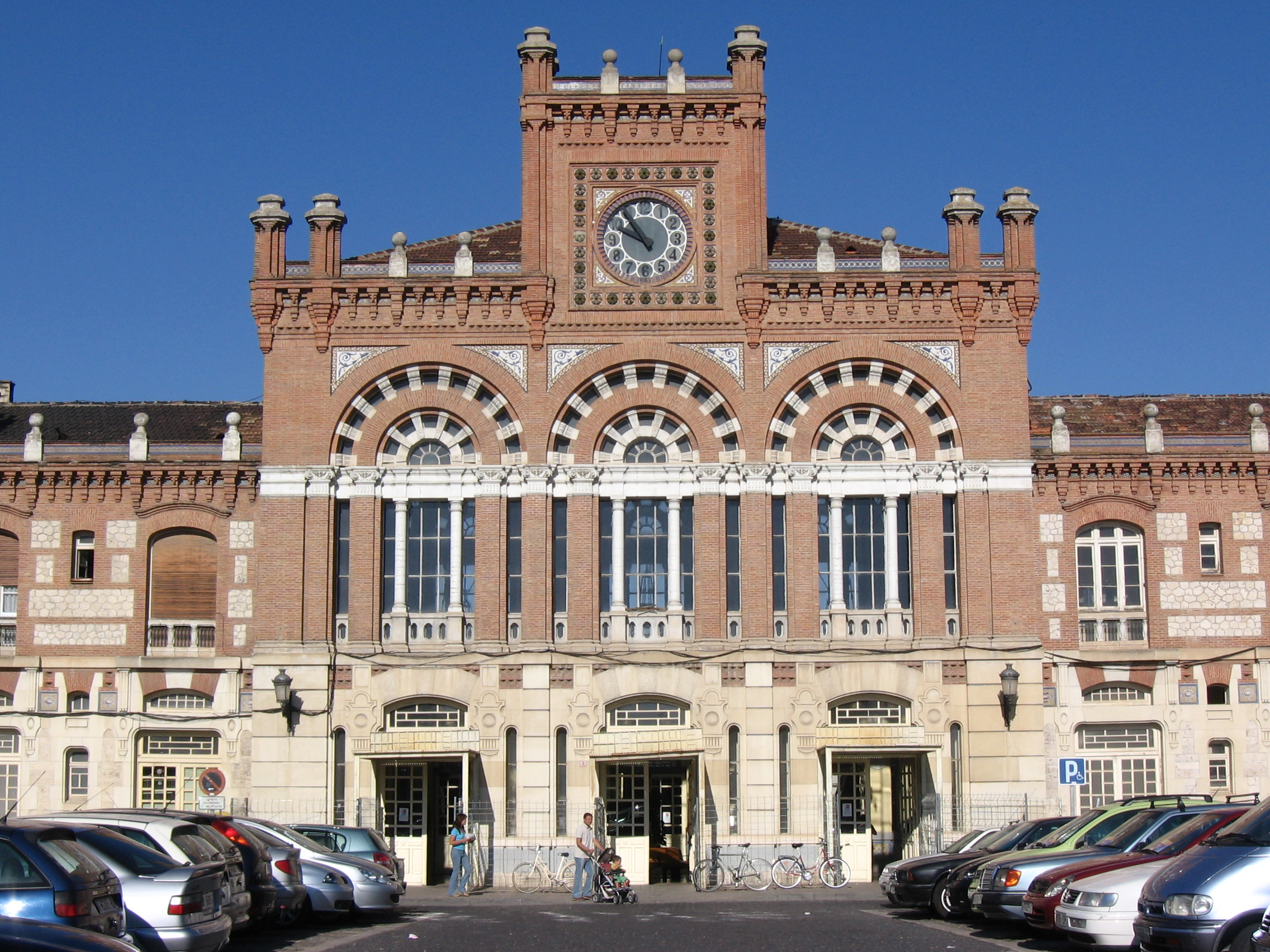
Railway station

Railway transport arrived to Aranjuez on 9 February 1851, with the opening of the Madrid–Aranjuez line, the second in the Iberian Peninsula after Barcelona–Mataró (not the second in Spain, as the Havana–Güines line had been opened in Cuba in 1837). Aranjuez was granted the title of town (villa) in 1899.

In the context of the 1936–1939 Spanish Civil War, Aranjuez remained under Republican control until the end of the conflict, becoming the headquarters of the 9th Division of the Spanish Republican Army. Important battles of the war such as the Battle of Seseña and the Battle of Jarama took place not far from Aranjuez. Following the seizure by the Rebel faction, a Francoist concentration camp was active in Aranjuez in 1939.

== Main sites ==
The city was declared Conjunto Histórico-Artístico ("Historic Artistic Junction") in 1983. In 2001 UNESCO listed the Aranjuez Cultural landscape as a World Heritage Site.

=== Mariblanca ===
This was the first extension beyond the Royal Palace, along the south bank of the river Tagus (Local spelling Tajo). The royal Church of San Antonio which was built by Philip IV of Spain for both public and ceremonial royal use, stands at the southern end of Plaza San Antonio popularly known as Mariblanca, (possibly because it is a 'sea' of white sand or mar de arena blanca or else an allusion to the female statue of the fountain at the far end, which is the Venus of sculptor Juan Reyna in 1762).

=== Plaza de Toros ===
A bullring, one of the earliest in Spain, the original was built in 1760 by order of King Charles IV, the refurbished structure was opened by his wife, Maria Luisa of Parma, on 14 May 1797. It had a capacity of 9000 spectators at a time when the population, according to the then prime minister, was only 4226. There are twelve public entrances which lead to three circular galleries, each with 10 stone seating benches. Royalty and their guests enjoyed a private entrance with stairs leading directly to the royal box.

Following a fire in 1809, King Ferdinand VII had it rebuilt and donated it to the town, which installed a small museum (usually only open to the public Saturday, Sunday and Monday mornings at 11.15).

=== Buildings ===
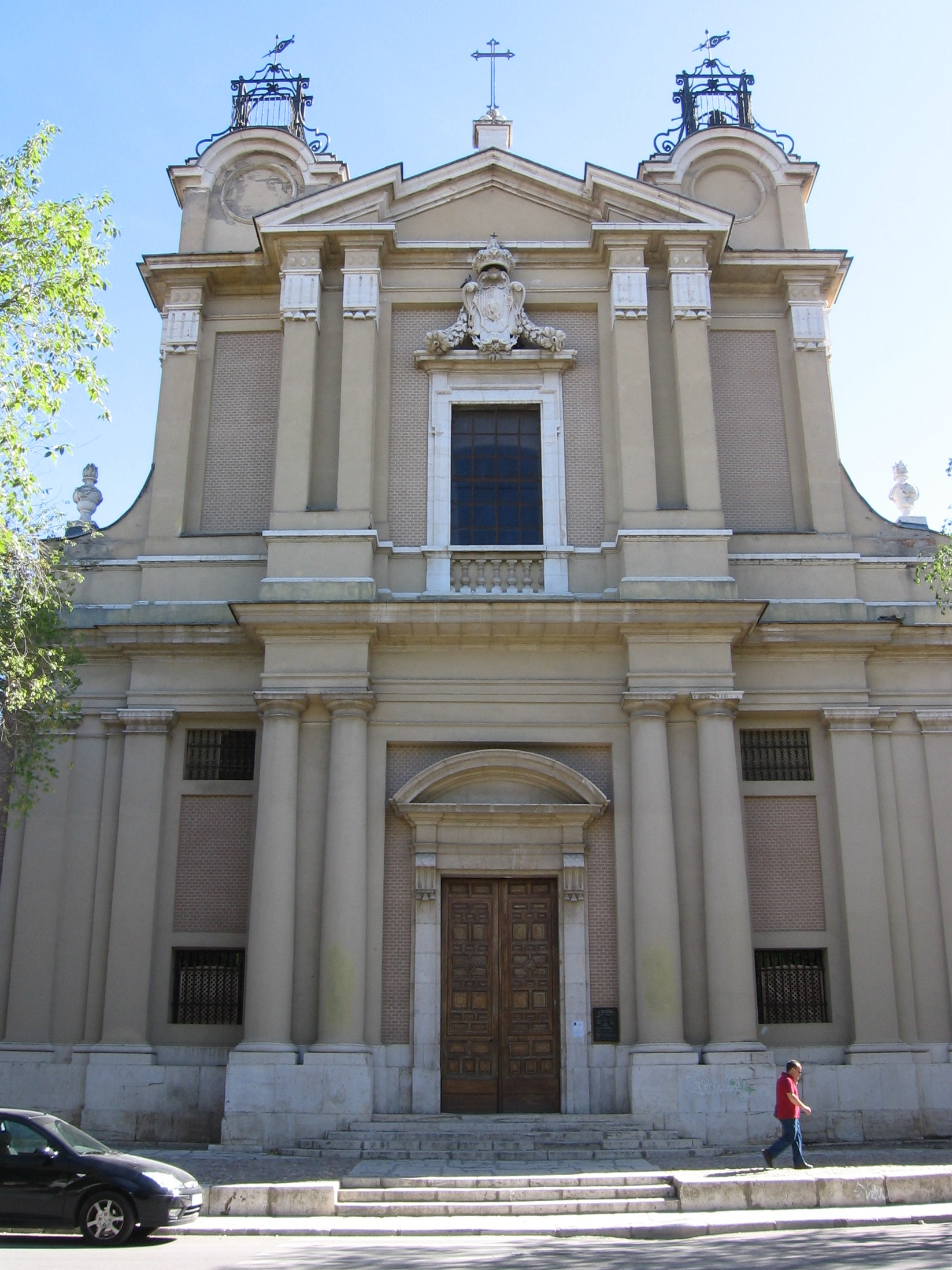
Royal Convent of San Pascual

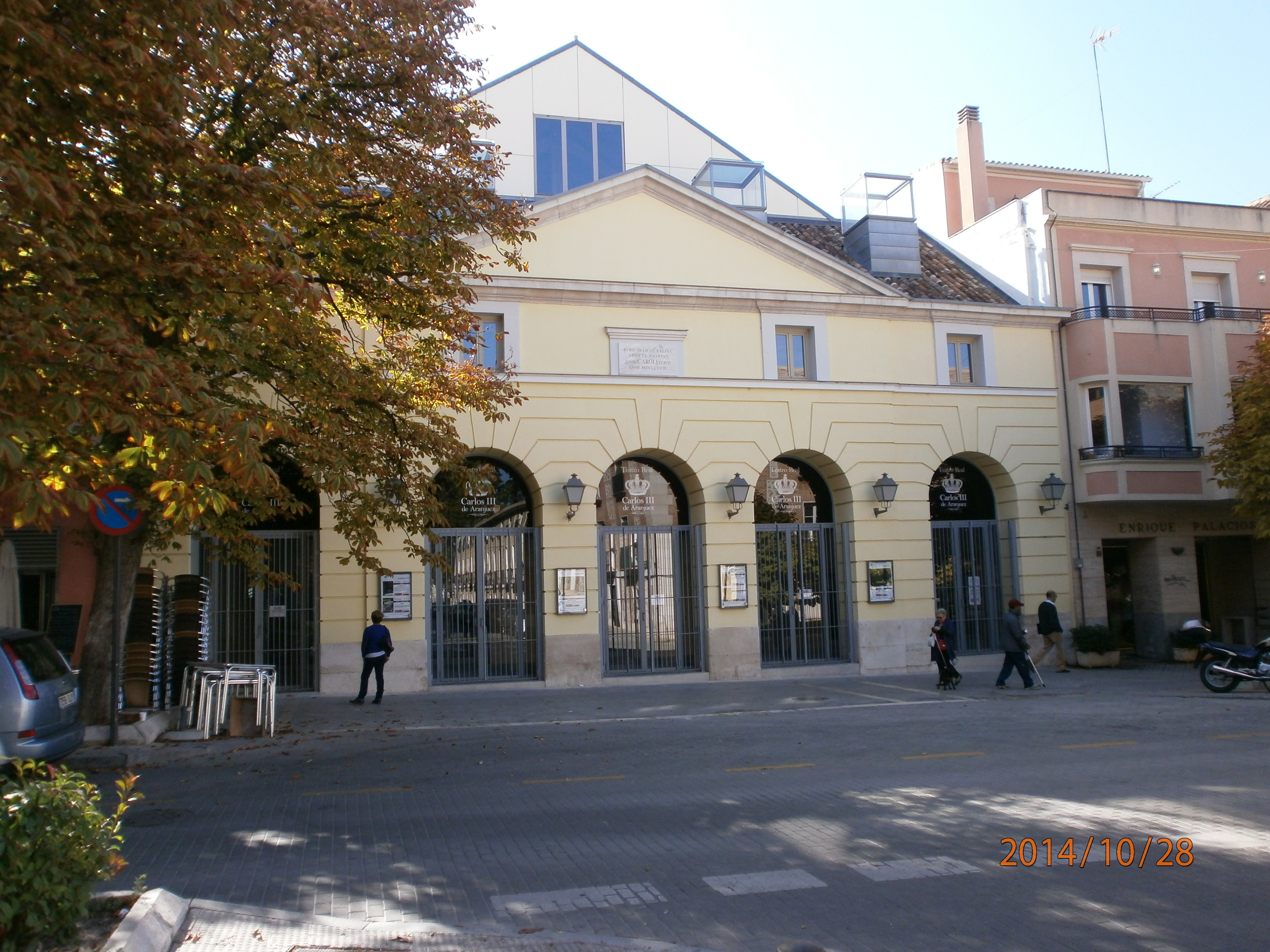
Teatro Carlos III theatre built during Charles III's reign.

Sights in the city include many buildings in addition to the 17th century Royal Palace and church mentioned above:

- House of Trades and Knights
- House of Infantes and Atarfe
- Pleasure craft Museum
- Farmhand's House
- House of Employees (currently Town Hall)
- Alpajes Church
- Saint Pascual's Royal Convent
- Old Saint Charles' Hospital (to be restored)
- Charles III's Royal Theatre (recently restored and reopened in 2014)
- Supply Market
- Plaza de Toros and Bullfighting Museum "Una Gran Fiesta"
- Medinaceli Palace
- Governor's House (currently University of High Studies Centre Philip II)
- Mother Queen's old garage, today cultural centre "Isabel de Farnesio"
- Typical 'corralas' (buildings with running balconies around a central courtyard)
- Godoy and Osuna Palaces
- Silvela's Palace (also known as Bavaria's Palace)
- Royal Country Estate of Saint Isidro

=== Parks and gardens ===
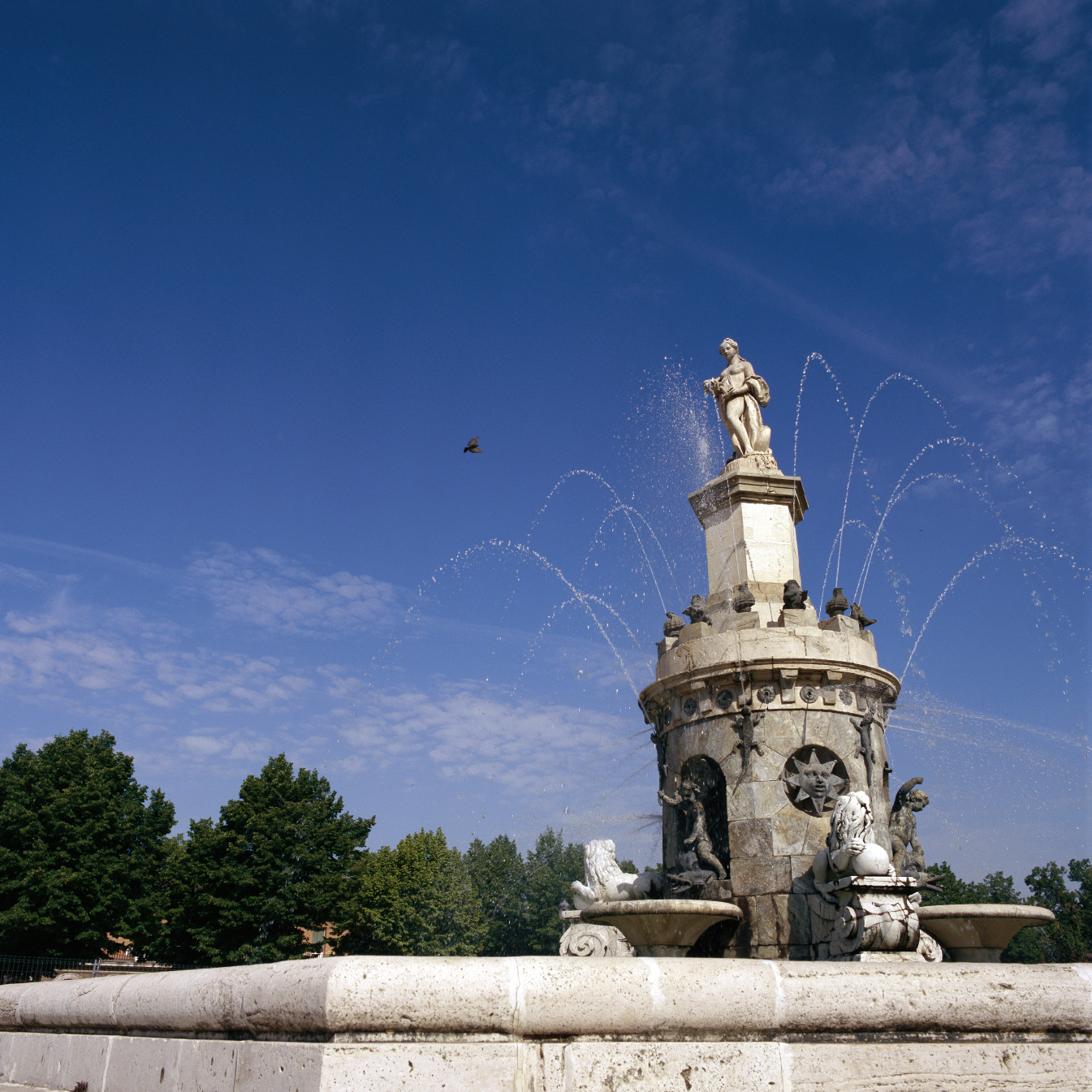
Fountain, Aranjuez Cultural Landscape

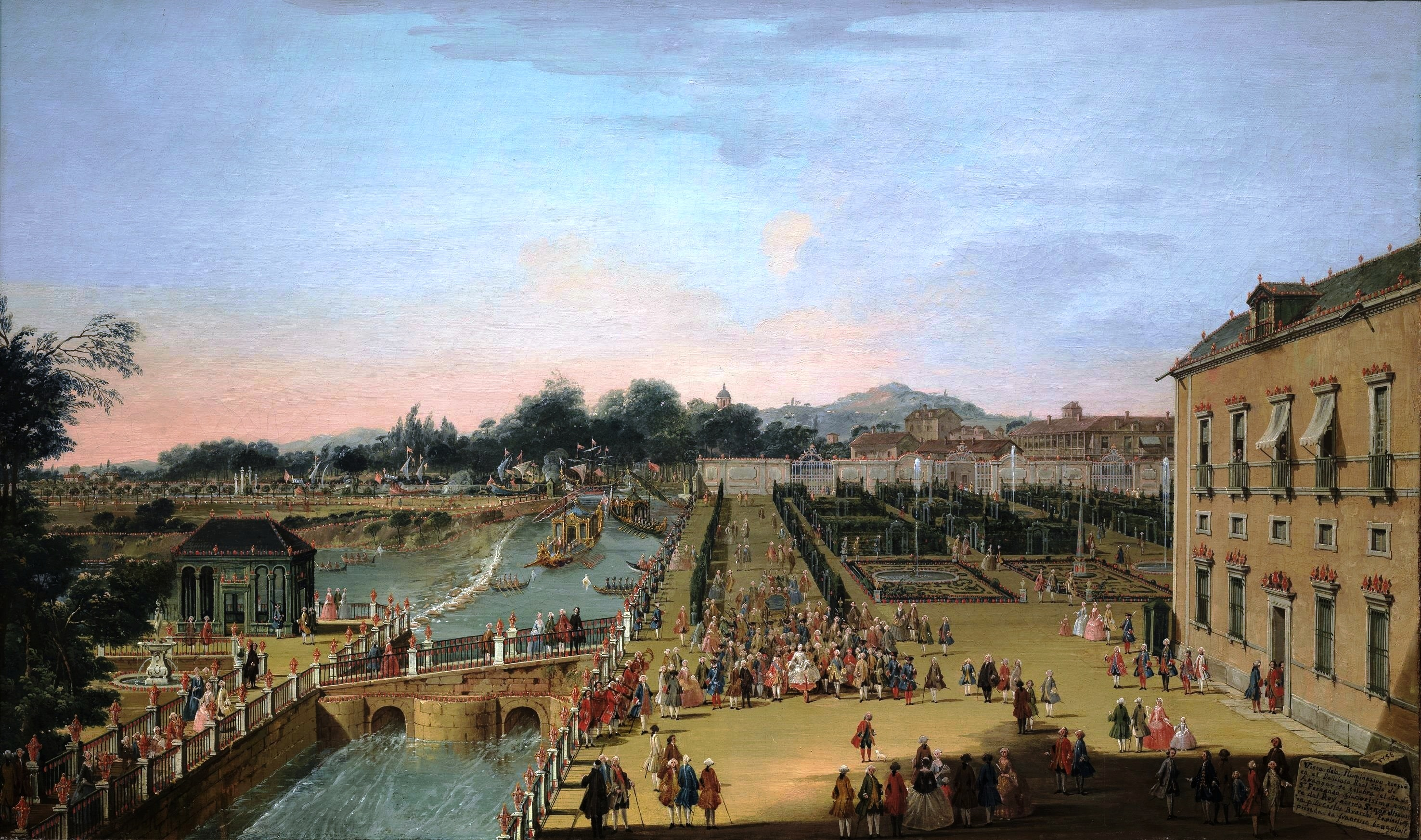
The Gardens of Aranjuez as depicted by Francesco Battaglioli in the 18th century.

Numerous parks and gardens are open to the public (detailed in )

- Isle Garden – to the north of the palace, bordered by the river (beyond weir) and a broad irrigation canal
- Parterre Garden The formal garden and fountains in front of the palace and to the north of Mariblanca/San Isadro
- Prince's Garden Along the river to the east, bordered by Calle de la Reina
- Isabella II's Garden a small formal garden adjacent to Mariblanca/San Isidro
- Historical thickets and woodlands
- Centre of Interpretation of the Natural Reserve "El Regajal-Mar de Ontígola"
- Tree-lined walks and rides through the former nursery gardens (now agriculture) at Doce Calles (12 ways roundabout on M-305 Northbound to Madrid)

== Climate ==
Aranjuez has a cold semi-arid climate (Köppen BSk) with cool winters and hot, dry summers.

Climate data for Aranjuez, 1981–2010
Month	Jan	Feb	Mar	Apr	May	Jun	Jul	Aug	Sep	Oct	Nov	Dec	Year
Mean daily maximum °C (°F)	11.7 (53.1)	14.0 (57.2)	18.1 (64.6)	19.8 (67.6)	24.1 (75.4)	30.4 (86.7)	34.4 (93.9)	33.7 (92.7)	28.7 (83.7)	21.8 (71.2)	15.7 (60.3)	11.8 (53.2)	22.0 (71.6)
Mean daily minimum °C (°F)	0.3 (32.5)	1.2 (34.2)	3.6 (38.5)	5.5 (41.9)	9.3 (48.7)	14.0 (57.2)	16.5 (61.7)	16.2 (61.2)	12.9 (55.2)	8.5 (47.3)	3.8 (38.8)	1.4 (34.5)	7.8 (46.0)
Average rainfall mm (inches)	23.0 (0.91)	25.3 (1.00)	22.8 (0.90)	38.4 (1.51)	43.0 (1.69)	18.7 (0.74)	6.5 (0.26)	5.6 (0.22)	20.9 (0.82)	49.8 (1.96)	39.0 (1.54)	41.5 (1.63)	334.5 (13.18)
Source: World Meteorological Organization

== Government and administration ==
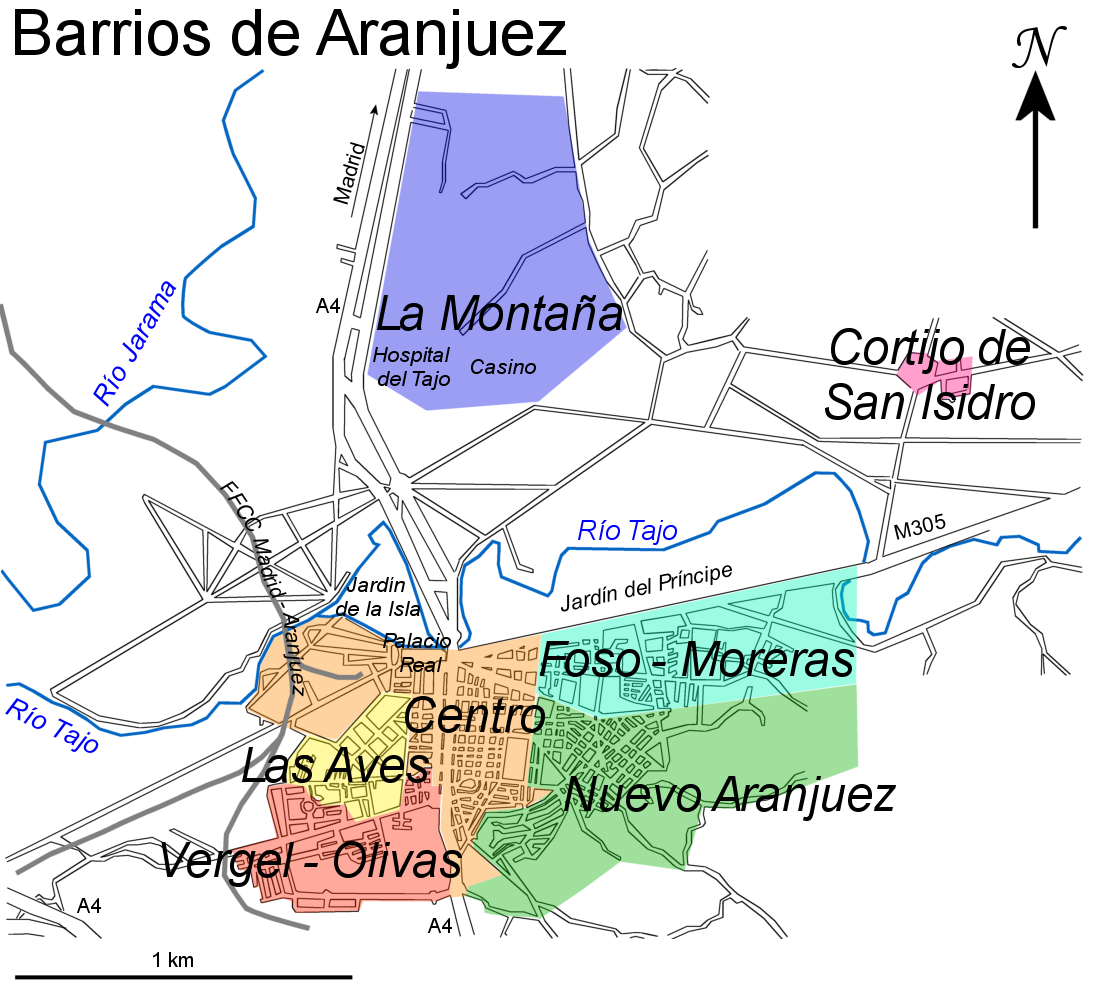
The barrios or districts of Aranjuez

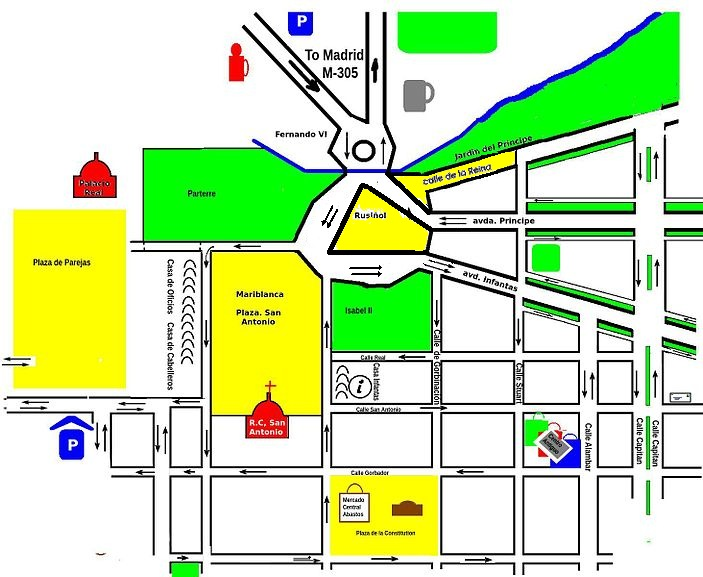
This is an orientation sketch of the Centro or old town and is not to scale

The city of Aranjuez is governed by a single municipal authority, which, for convenience divides into the several administrative districts which in turn may contain residential estates (urbanizaciones):

- Centro, includes the royal sites, the bullring and the historic town center, with central market and shopping
- Vergel – Olivas,
- Polígono de Las Aves, to the west near the railway station, near Pirelli & Jardín Narváez
- Nuevo Aranjuez, to the south, on higher ground
- Foso – Moreras associated with Garden City of Agfa, and ambitious, but as yet incomplete project
- Urbanización Mirador de Aranjuez A vast, mostly failed (turn of the 20th–21st century) house-building project on a steep southerly slope overlooking the old town.
- La Montaña – new (turn of the 20th–21st century) district of about 5000 homes (Many 'toxic assets' still vacant) about 3 km (1.9 mi) north of the town. It has the district Hospital-Tajo, a 4-star Hotel-Barcelo with spa and 18-hole golf-course, Gran-Casino, La Finca event venue, a vast commercial centre (Plaza) and car-park which was built but never opened, and a business campus Centro Empresial which contains the small-business support unit APME, a substantial supermarket and a few small businesses. Various shops are to be found elsewhere about the barrio. The residents Association is known as Asociación de Vecinos del Barrio de la Montaña or AVBM.
- Cortijo de San Isidro, a small residential settlement around a former royal hunting lodge, a volunteer sub-council represents residents interests.

== Economy ==
The main pillars of the local economy are hotels and tourism. Aranjuez has always been an attractive city for tourists with its Royal Palace, the gardens, the Tagus river and the landscapes. In 2001 this city was designated as a World Heritage Cultural landscape by UNESCO, and since then, tourism has kept on increasing until hit by the 2008 recession. Prior to 2008 much money was spent in order to beautify Aranjuez and many pubs and restaurants were opened (from 2001 to 2004 their number increased 22%).

=== La Montaña ===
This was a 'pharonic' proyecto de Actuación Urbanística (PAU) of some 5000 mixed 'open market homes (Viviendas precio libre or VPL) of which, by 2012, something around one fifth were actually sold. The remainder are now owned by the 'bad bank' SAREB In 2005 a major events and gambling installation Gran Casino was opened in the (northern) barrio Montaña near the existing conference centers of La Finca and Hotel Occidental Aranjuez (which includes an 18-hole golf course). Nearby, the ambitious Plaza commercial center, built but not fitted, has never opened, and the smaller enterprise center, although open, contains a local supermarket, two cafés an English Academy and less than a dozen other small businesses. Finally, in March 2008 the University Hospital Tajo was opened. In 2013 this hospital, together with several others medical facilities in the Community of Madrid was threatened with privatisation, provoking considerable public protest known as the Marea Blanca (the white (coat) wave or tide).

=== Agriculture ===
Aranjuez is located on the fertile plain in the deep, high sided valley (cuenca) of the river Tagus (the comarca Vega del Tajo), whose rich soil is suitable for growing wheat and other cereals. There are also horticultural plantations, notably of asparagus and strawberries but also (centered on Villaconejos) vineyards and extensive production of melons. Typical of the neighbouring region of Castilla-La Mancha Aranjuez and the Vega del Tajo also produce a wide variety of products such as sorghum, sunflowers, potatoes, tomatoes, artichokes, beets and Jalapeño peppers.

The Real Cortijo de San Isidro is a settlement about 6 km north of Aranjuez where King Charles III of Spain established a royal farm in 1766, exploiting existing agricultural land. There is a village with a royal chapel (Hermitage) and a wine cellar (Bodegas del Real Cortijo de San Isidro)

=== Industry ===
The proximity to Madrid and the good communications by road and rail made Aranjuez a suitable location for industry: detergents, Mechanical engineering, computer and electrical material, photographic materials, pharmaceutical products, paints and varnishes, sugar refineries, and oil mills.

The majority of the industries are located to the west of the railway station or in the "Gonzalo Chacón" industrial park, in the south. The main existing industries are:

- Indra Sistemas (Defence and high technology computer & informatics systems).
- Electrónica Aranjuez (EASA High technology & defence electronics), part of grupo Espacio Industrial.
- Bosch (electrical components for automobiles).
- Carburos Metálicos Medical and industrial gasses and chemicals.
- FYSE Pharmaceuticals, a division of / Ercros Industrial S.A.
- Cortefiel, a garment logistics facility for a retail company marketing brands such as Springfield, women'secret, Fifty Factory, Antonio Miró Studio and Pedro del Hierro Fashion
- API Fabricación (Road signage) part of grupo Imesapi

Previous industrial activities now reduced, mothballed or closed included

- Lever Brothers (manufacture and packaging of detergents)
- ISN (formerly Fruehauf) trailer manufacture & precision plastics for transport industry
- Embalajes Castro S.A. Wooden crate manufacturer & general packaging specialists
- Near the station there is also extensive unused railway sidings, warehouses and a sugar refining plant all presumably abandoned in the early part of the 20th century Proposals for rehabilitation of this zone as a rail to road container port are currently (2018) under consideration.
- Agfa film: ECESA (Estudios Cinema Español), S.A.created in 1931, reformed in 1935 as E.A.S.A. (Estudios de Aranjuez, Sociedad Anónima) but made few films. In 1950 (MAFE (Manufacturas Fotográficas Españolas, S.A.) started to produce photographic film, and was absorbed into Agfa in 1964 before being closed definitively in 2001.

== Transportation ==
Aranjuez enjoys excellent road and rail links to the Spanish capital city of Madrid.

=== Road ===
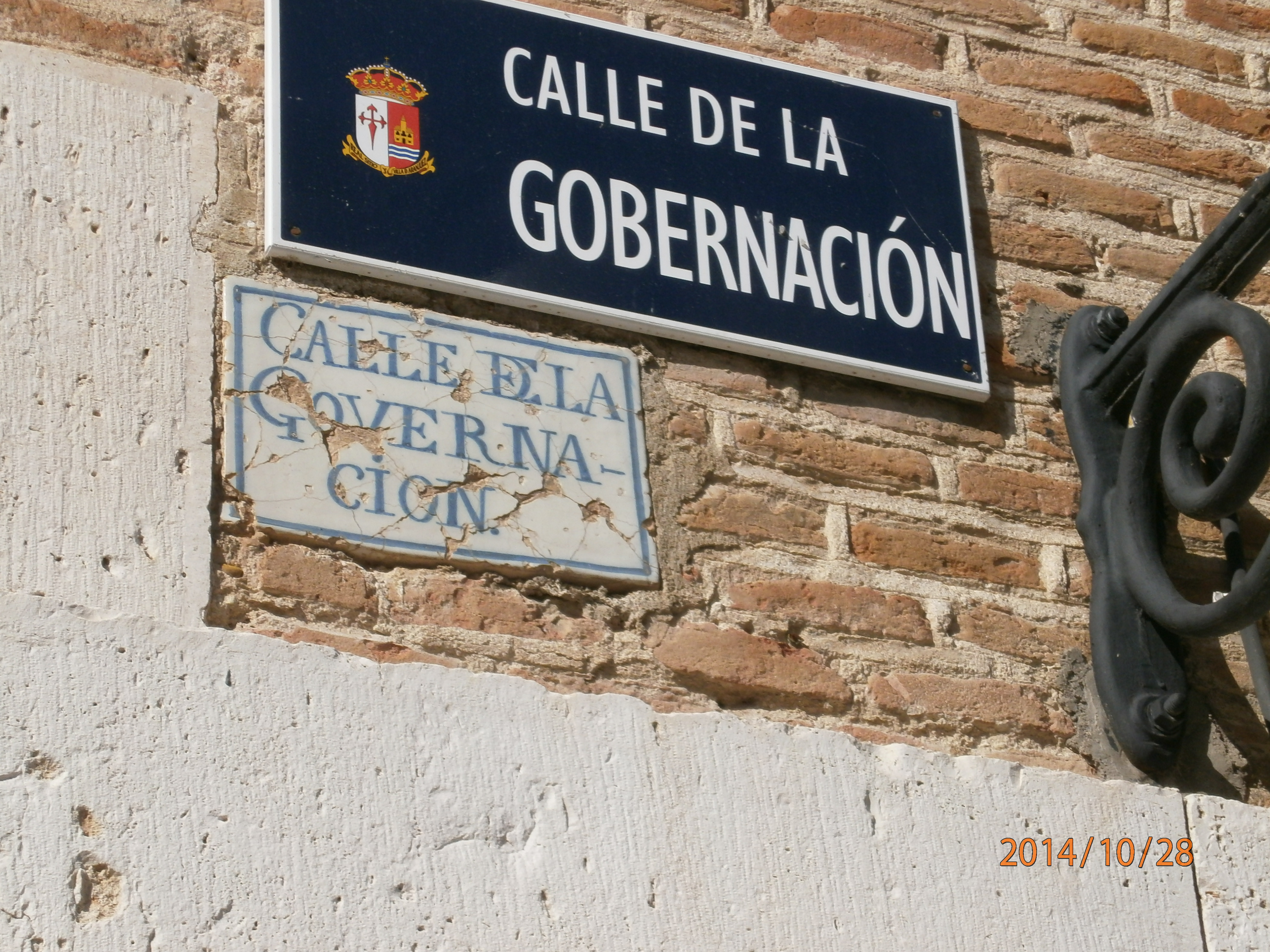
18th century and 21st century street sign in Aranjuez

Aranjuez is served by the public Autovía A-4 (Madrid Cordoba) The exit at kilometre 37 connects to the M-305 (regular road which leads via La Montaña district and automotive sales zone (3 km north of city) and then directly to the royal palace. The A4 exit at kilometre 52 serves the south of the town, as does the toll road Radial R-4.

Six main line bus routes serve the locality via the bus station, Las Infantas. Taxis and local bus services (four routes) link to the railway station.

The municipality provides a free public pedal bicycle scheme although there is a modest registration fee.

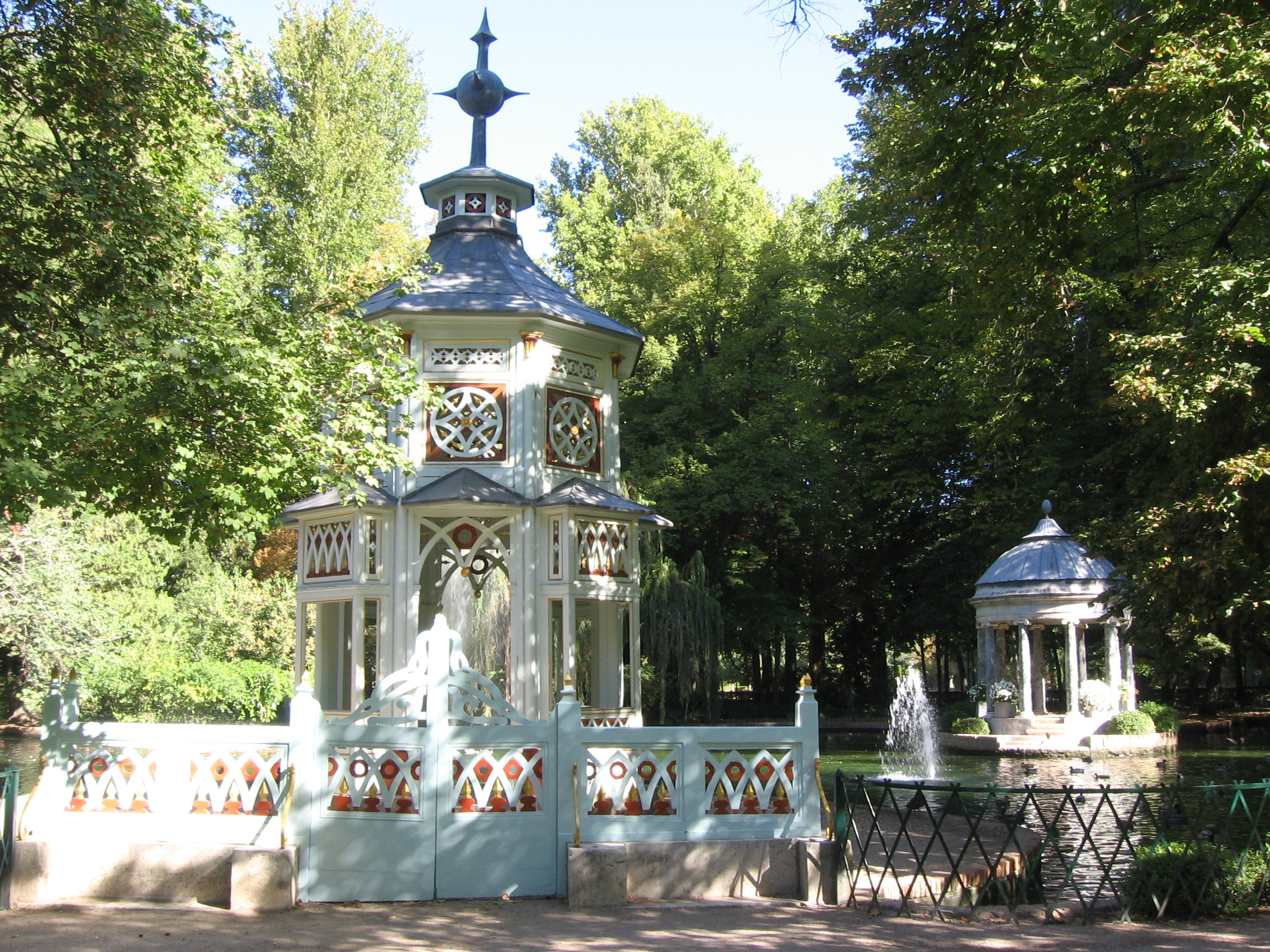
Chinese Kiosks in 18th-century Jardín del Príncipe garden.

There is also a tourist Chiquitren road train which tours the town and the extensive jardin del principe royal garden.

=== Rail ===
Aranjuez railway station building is richly ornamented in the neomudéjar style. It was built by the then operator Compañía de los Ferrocarriles de Madrid a Zaragoza y Alicante between 1922 and 1927. It was recently renovated by RENFE, who operate an hourly shuttle service to Madrid and medium distance services to other destinations. The Strawberry train is a special Steam locomotive Heritage railway service provided for summer visitors and tourists.

=== River ===
Hydrographic demonstration piece near the ancient noria of the barrio of La Montaña, near Hospital Tajo, Aranjuez.

The river is obstructed and so used only by a local tourist boat and canoeists. There is an annual fun rafting competition run by the pirates of the tajo.

An ancient irrigation system for the royal kitchen-gardens and orchards (now farmland) includes channels and a noria waterwheel, recently restored in a leisure area known as Talud Sur (south bank of) de La Montaña de Aranjuez. The old, tree-lined avenues around are maintained provide shady level walkways.

== Local media ==
=== Print media ===
- Heraldo de Aranjuez.
- Tablón de Anuncios.
- Consumo Digital.
- Cuatro Esquinas.
- Divergente.
- El Espejo.

=== Radio stations ===
- Onda Aranjuez, 107.8 FM.
- Cadena Ser Aranjuez, 89.3 FM.
- Onda Cero Aranjuez, 90.7 FM.
- Radio Fuga, 92.1 FM.

== Sports facilities ==
- The city has a long tradition of water sports due to its connection with the Tagus river, such as canoeing, stand-up paddleboarding and rowing. In the Olympic bid of Madrid for the 2012 Olympics, which were held in London, Aranjuez was the selected site for these sports. In spite of this, there are plans to continue the construction of the necessary sport facilities, which should be finished by 2010.
- Aranjuez has a football team, Real Aranjuez C.F., which plays in the Local Stadium, called "El Deleite".
- Nearby Ocaña has a skydiving and gliding centre at the Aerodrome, and most of the skydivers there base themselves in Aranjuez.
- Aranjuez has 18 hole-golf course located on "The Mountain", which belongs to the Hotel Occidental Aranjuez.

== Notable people ==
- Infante Carlos, Count of Molina (1788–1855), Infante of Spain and claimant to the throne.
- Francisco Clavet, tennis player.
- Francis, Duke of Cadiz, husband of queen Isabella II of Spain.
- Javier García Portillo, football player.
- Ángel Parra, judoka.
- Joaquín Rodrigo, composer and 1st Marqués de los Jardines de Aranjuez.
- Santiago Rusiñol, painter.
- Jose Luis Sampedro, writer.
- Iván Sánchez-Rico Soto alias Riki, football player.
- Francisco Agustín Silvela y Blanco, Minister of Gobernación and Gracia y Justicia. Vice-President of the Congress of Deputies and Magistrate of the Supreme Court.
- Carlos Suarez, Basketball player.

== Aranjuez in the arts ==
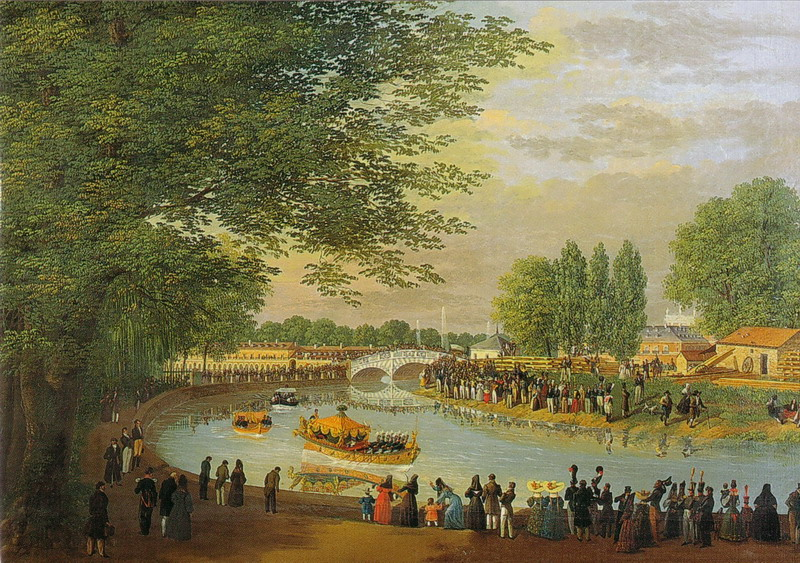
Painting of a Falúa ship in Aranjuez by Fernando Bambrilla in 1830.

Friedrich Schiller's drama Don Carlos starts with the words "Die schönen Tage in Aranjuez sind nun zu Ende."

Joaquín Rodrigo wrote the Concierto de Aranjuez (1939) for guitar and orchestra which was inspired by the royal gardens of Aranjuez and became one of the most famous orchestral compositions of the 20th century.

The Austrian writer Peter Handke wrote the play Die schönen Tage von Aranjuez (The beautiful days of Aranjuez), which was translated into English by Michael Roloff.

== Culture ==
=== Traditions ===
In summer it is traditional to eat dinner in the picnic areas next to the Tagus river. These places are called gangos, a Spanish word used only in Aranjuez.

==== Festivals ====
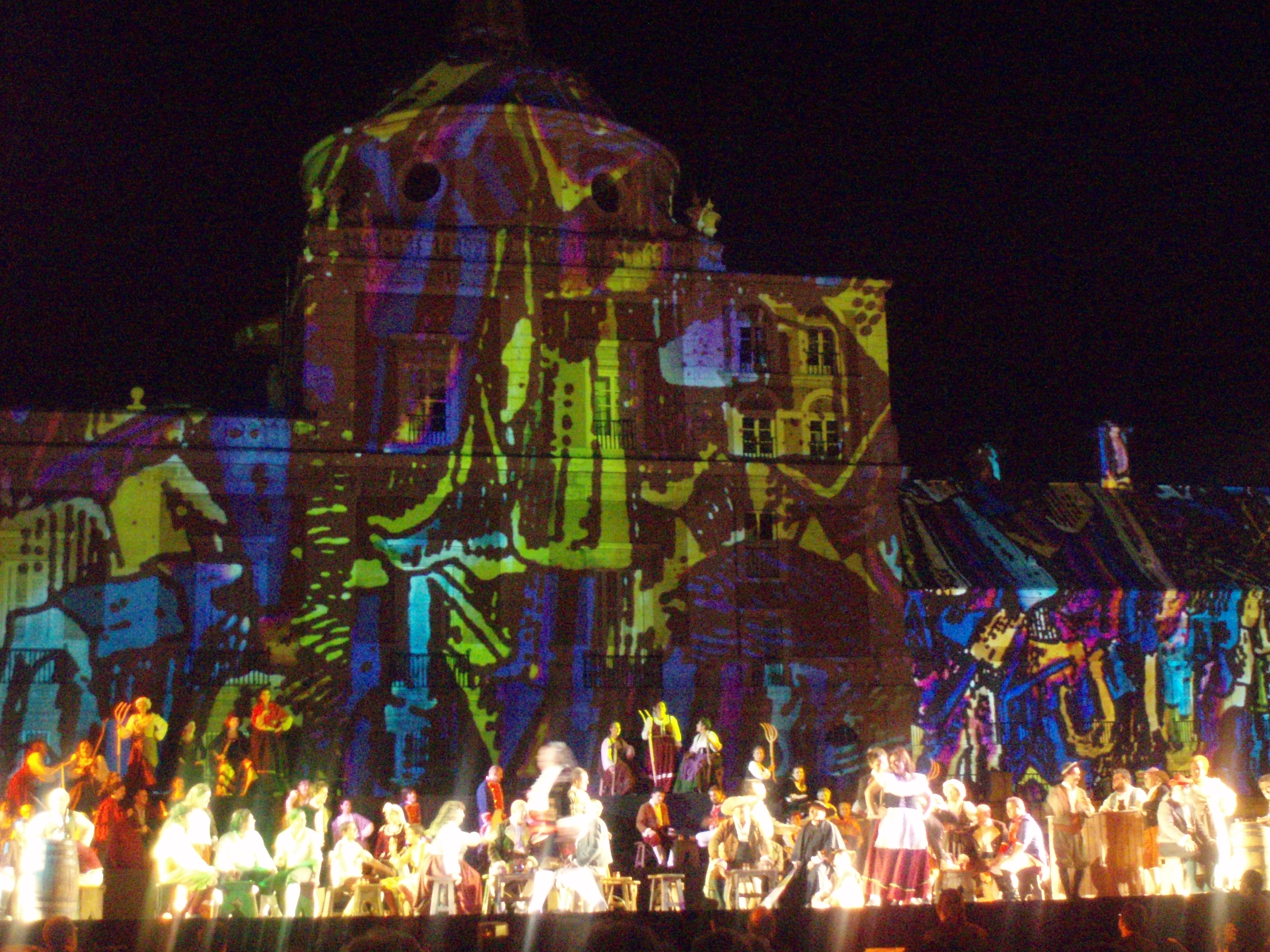
Mutiny of Aranjuez re-enactment / Motín de Aranjuez 2006

- Alfaranjuez In May – includes a Craft Fair with Folk Aranjuez Traditional Music Festival and a used vehicle fair.
- San Isidro Labrador day, 15 May, pilgrimage in the nearby hunting lodge of Real Cortijo de San Isidro.
- San Fernando town festival week, around 30 May, parades and events.
- 'Early Music Festival Aranjuez, held in about May or June
- Book Fair Aranjuez, in contrast with the Used Book Fair and Sale, held in September.
- Mutiny of Aranjuez re-enactment about first week of September, declared a cultural event of National Tourist Interest, which includes
  - a funfair (car park, M-305),
  - sports events (Delete stadium),
  - food and drink stalls (Mariblanca),
  - a concert at the Royal Palace,
  - a traditional or Sacrificio Goyesque (in the Plaza de Toros),
  - a dramatic street re-enactment of the flaming torch attack and capture of Godoy at his Palace, (that building now houses a school) with fireworks and costumes inspired by Goya paintings.
  - A fun raft-race organized by the pirates of the Tajo social club

==== Gastronomy ====
- Local horticultural produce, especially:
  - Strawberries and asparagus
  - Sweet, green toadskin melons, olive oil and local wine from nearby comarca 'Las Vagas' which includes Villaconejos – Chinchón agricultural areas
- Pheasant, a characteristic gamebird from the area's forests.

== Twin towns – sister cities ==
Town	State/Region	Country
Écija	Andalusia	Spain
Le Pecq	Yvelines	France

== Other towns within the municipality ==
- Algodor
- Castillejo
- Las Infantas
- Real Cortijo de San Isidro
