= Valdemorillo =

- Municipality
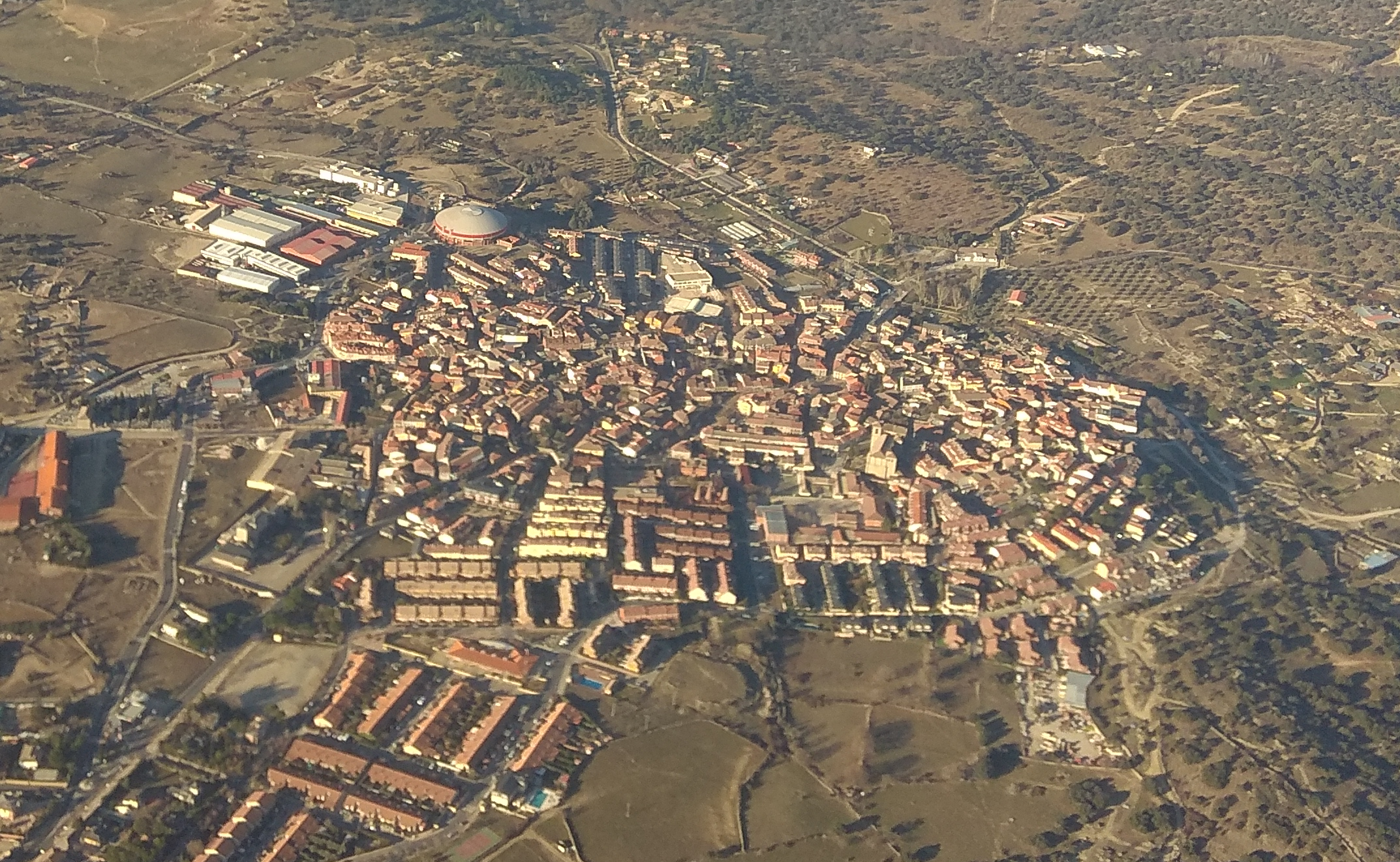

- Flag Coat of arms

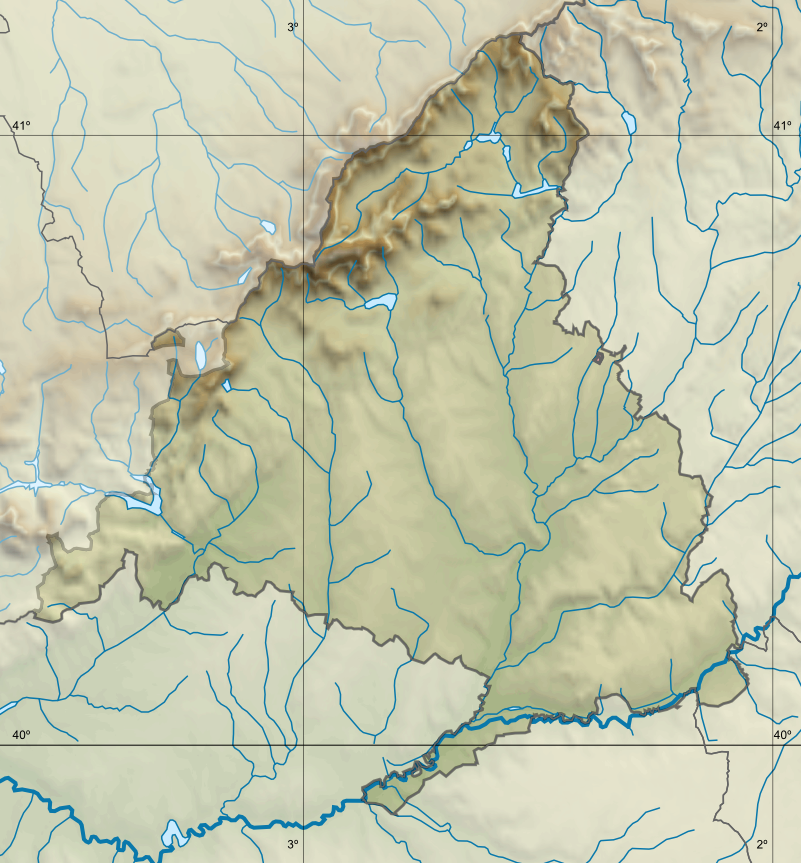
- Location within Spain Location within Community of Madrid
- Coordinates: 40°30.1′N 4°4′W
- Country: Spain
- Autonomous community: Community of Madrid

Government
  - Alcalde: Santiago Villena Acedos (PP)

Area
  - Total: 93.7 km^{2} (36.2 sq mi)
- Elevation: 815 m (2,674 ft)

Population (2025-01-01)
  - Total: 14,420
  - Density: 154/km^{2} (399/sq mi)
- Demonym: valdemorillense
- Time zone: UTC+1 (CET)
  - Summer (DST): UTC+2 (CEST)
- Postal code: 28210

Valdemorillo is a Spanish town and municipality located in the Community of Madrid. The municipality, with a population of 13,453 inhabitants (INE 2022), includes, in addition to the town of Mojadillas, El Paraíso, Pino Alto Cazadero Real, Pino Alto Sector Sur, Jarabeltrán, Puentelasierra, La Esperanza, Montemorillo, Parque de las Infantas, La Pizarrera, Mirador del Romero, Los Barrancos and Cerro Alarcón shared with Navalagamella and Ampliación Cerro Alarcón. In the municipality is located part of the reservoir of Valmayor.

== History ==
Since the late middle ages and up to the early 19th century, when it became part of the province of Madrid, Valdemorillo belonged to the land of Segovia, originally as part of the sexmo of Casarrubios.

== Geography ==
It limits the north with this locality, to the west with Robledo de Chavela and Navalagamella, to the east with Colmenarejo and to the south with Villanueva de la Cañada and Quijorna.

Among its main population centers are the urbanizations: Mojadillas, El Paraiso, Pino Alto, Jarabeltrán, Puentelasierra, Las Charquillas, La Esperanza, Montemorillo, Parque de las Infantas, La Pizarrera, Mirador del Romero, Mirador de Pino Alto, Los Barrancos, Valmayor and Cerro Alarcón I and II, the latter shared with Navalagamella. Its most important roads are the M-600, which connects El Escorial with Navalcarnero, and the M-510, which runs from Galapagar to Chapinería.

Valdemorillo is one of the maximum suppliers of drinking water in the Community of Madrid. In this town, part of the Valmayor reservoir is located, which also floods the municipalities of El Escorial and Colmenarejo. It is the second reservoir with the highest storage capacity in the Madrid region, after El Atazar.

Its term is partially included in the Regional Park of the middle course of the Guadarrama River and its surroundings. It is also part of the tourist itinerary known as the Imperial Route of the Community of Madrid, built around the roads used by Felipe II on his travels from Madrid to the Monastery of El Escorial.

== Festivities and traditions ==
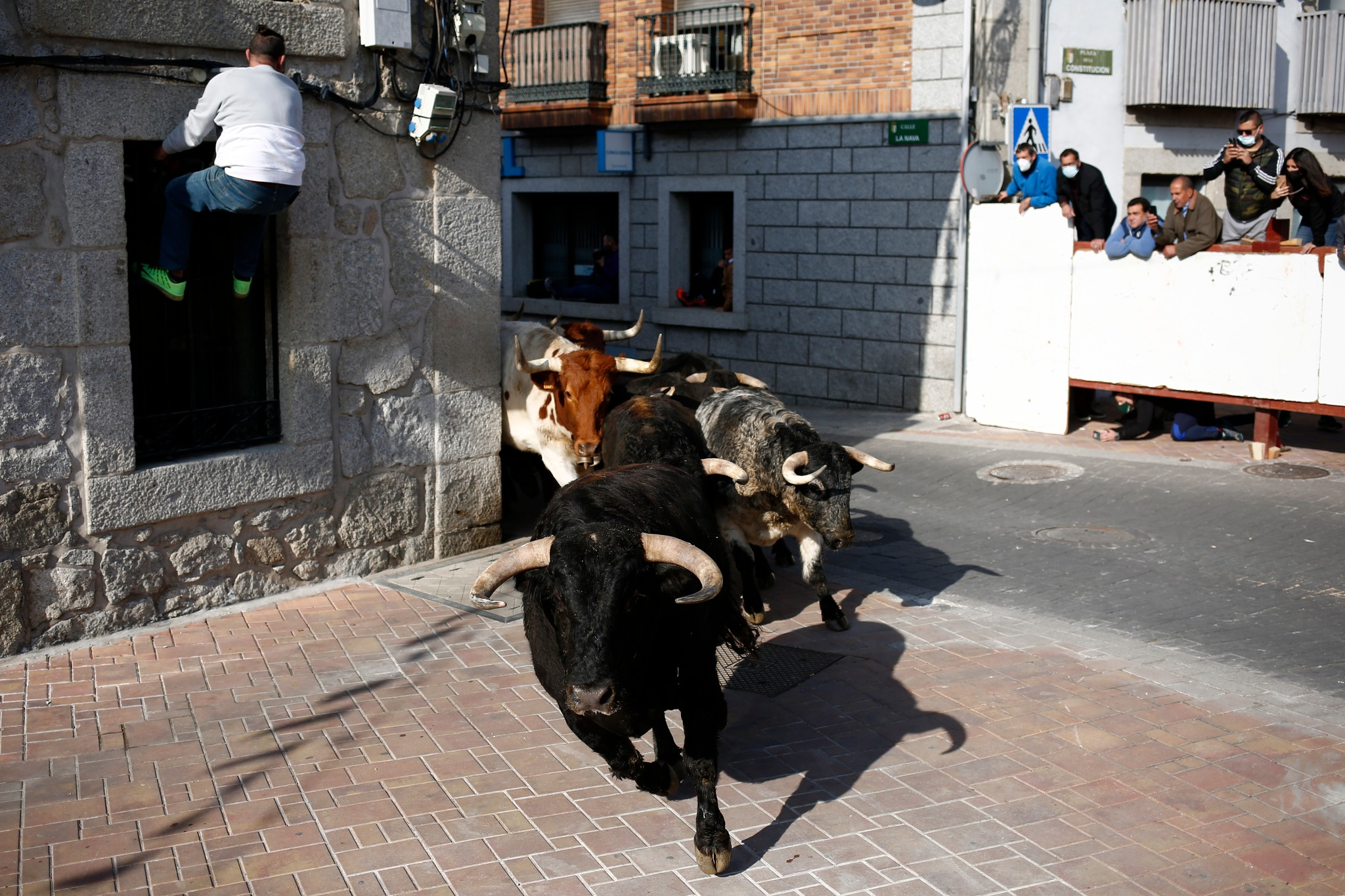
Running of the bulls of Valdemorillo

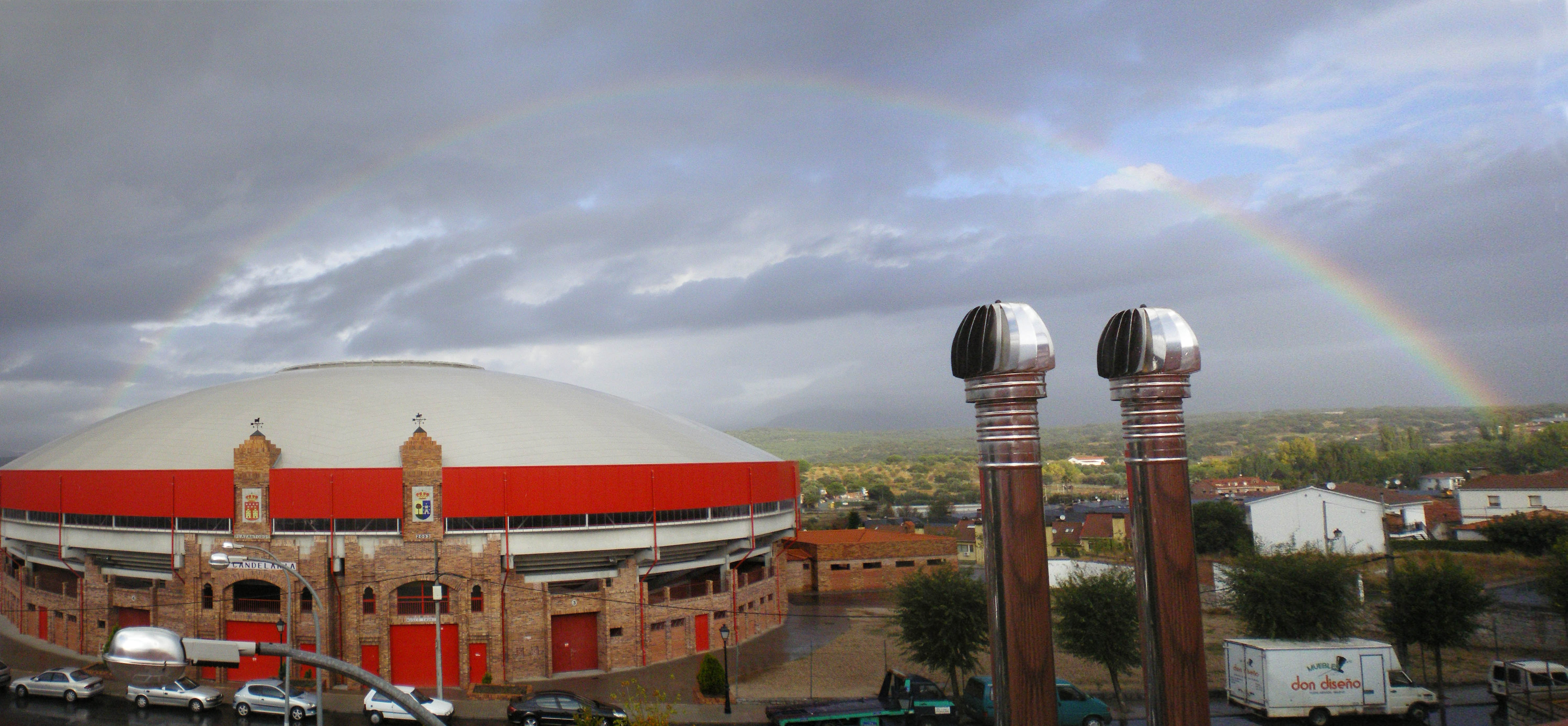
Bullring of Valdemorillo

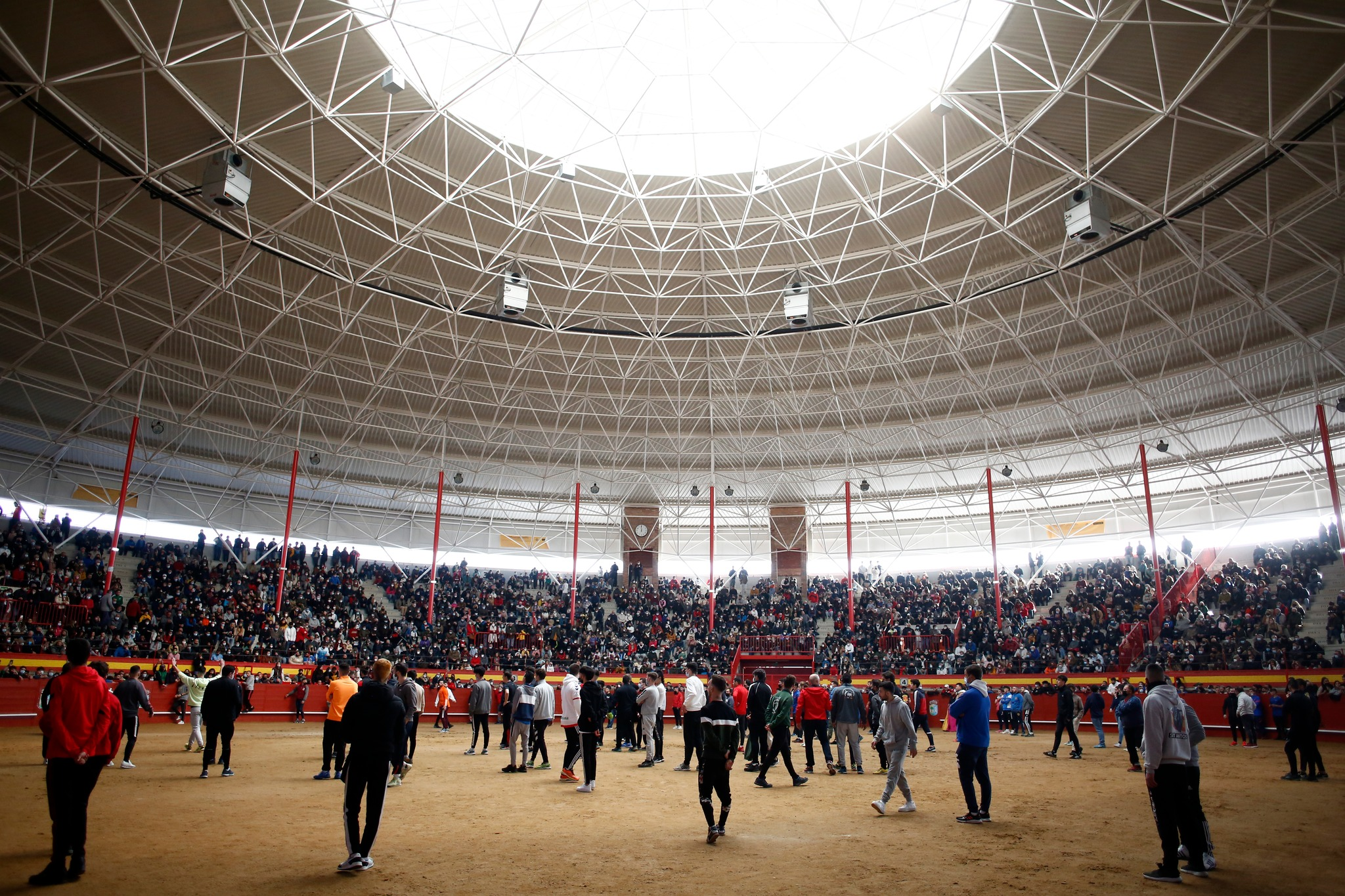
Inside Bullring La Candelaria of Valdemorillo

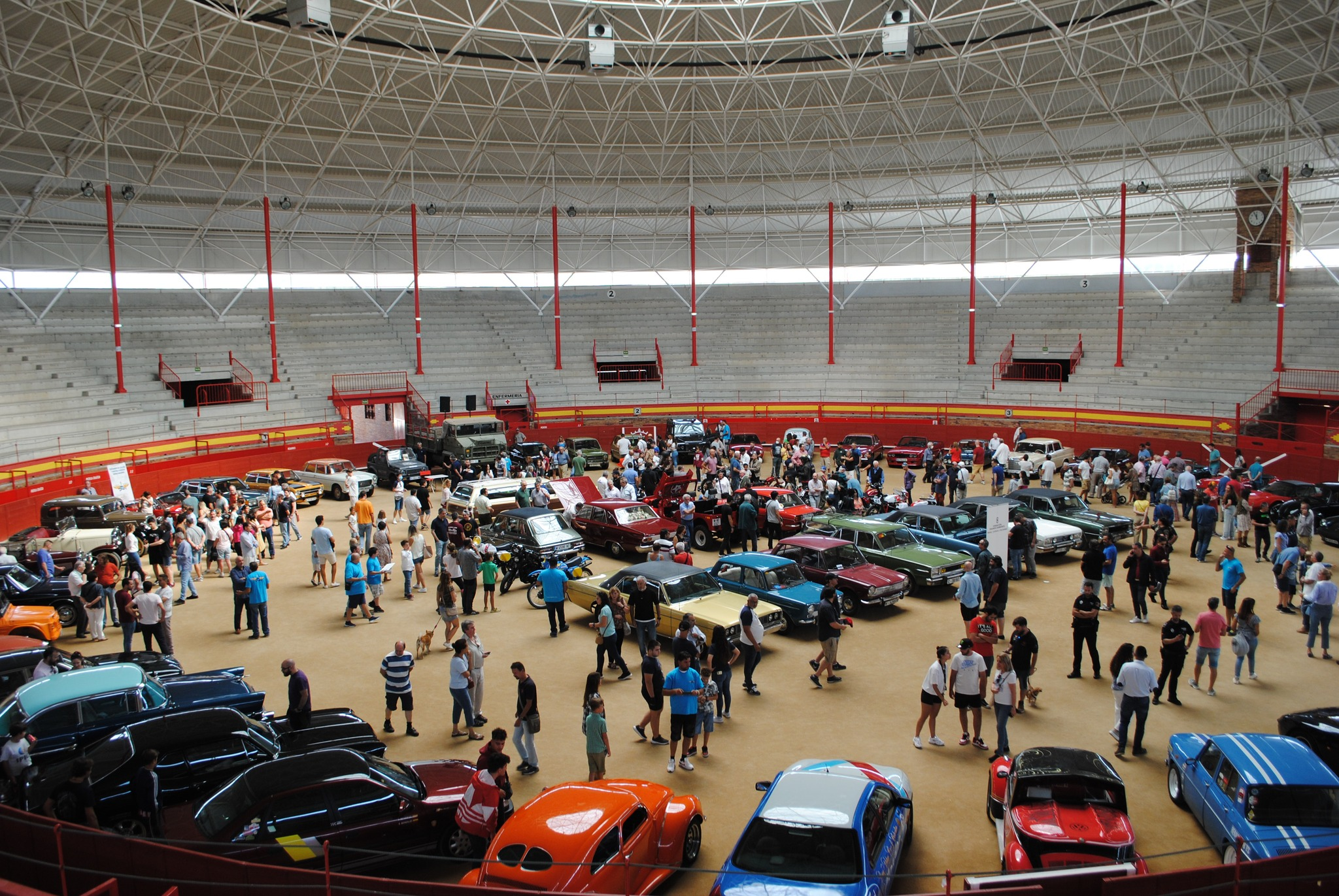
Classic cars exhibition in Valdemorillo

The town is famous for celebrating the first bullfighting fair of the year, which takes place at the beginning of February, within the major festivals of San Blas. This fair, which officially opens the bull season in Spain, takes place in the La Candelaria bullring, inaugurated in 2003.

The town has as patrons San Blas and La Candelaria (2 and 3 February), chosen only by the coincidence of their festivity with the arrival, in 1574, of the royal procession carrying the mortal remains of Emperor Carlos I, on the way to the Monastery of El Escorial, reason why it is included in the so-called Imperial Route of the Community of Madrid.

== See also ==
- Imperial Route of the Community of Madrid
