= Imperial Route of the Community of Madrid =

Spanish regional tourist itinerary

Municipalities integrated in the Imperial Route of the Community of Madrid

The Imperial Route of the Community of Madrid is the tourist itinerary promoted by the Ministry of Culture and Tourism of this Spanish region, which runs through several municipalities in the Sierra de Guadarrama. It partially follows the historical road that led to the Monastery of El Escorial, used in the 16th century by King Philip II in his travels from the city of Madrid to the Royal Site.

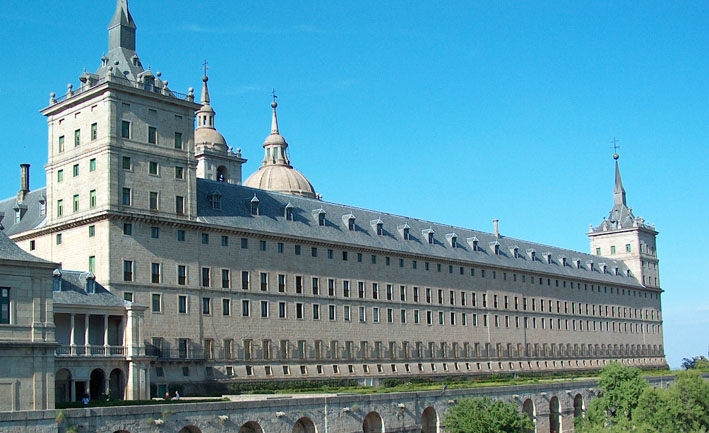
The Imperial Route is articulated around the Royal Monastery of El Escorial.

The Imperial Route has as its central core this monument, which, in 1984, was declared a World Heritage Site by UNESCO, along with the entire Royal Site. This extends over the municipalities of San Lorenzo de El Escorial and El Escorial, where there are buildings, engineering works and gardens of great historical and artistic value. In the former, in addition to the Royal Monastery, the Casas de Oficios and the Casita del Infante (or "de Arriba") stand out, and in the latter, the Casita del Príncipe (or "de Abajo").

This monumental complex is complemented by the tourist offer offered by different municipalities near the Monastery, belonging both to the region of the Sierra Oeste de Madrid and to that of the Guadarrama basin. In them, there is a modest but relevant artistic heritage and the existence of natural areas of great scenic and environmental interest.

== Description ==
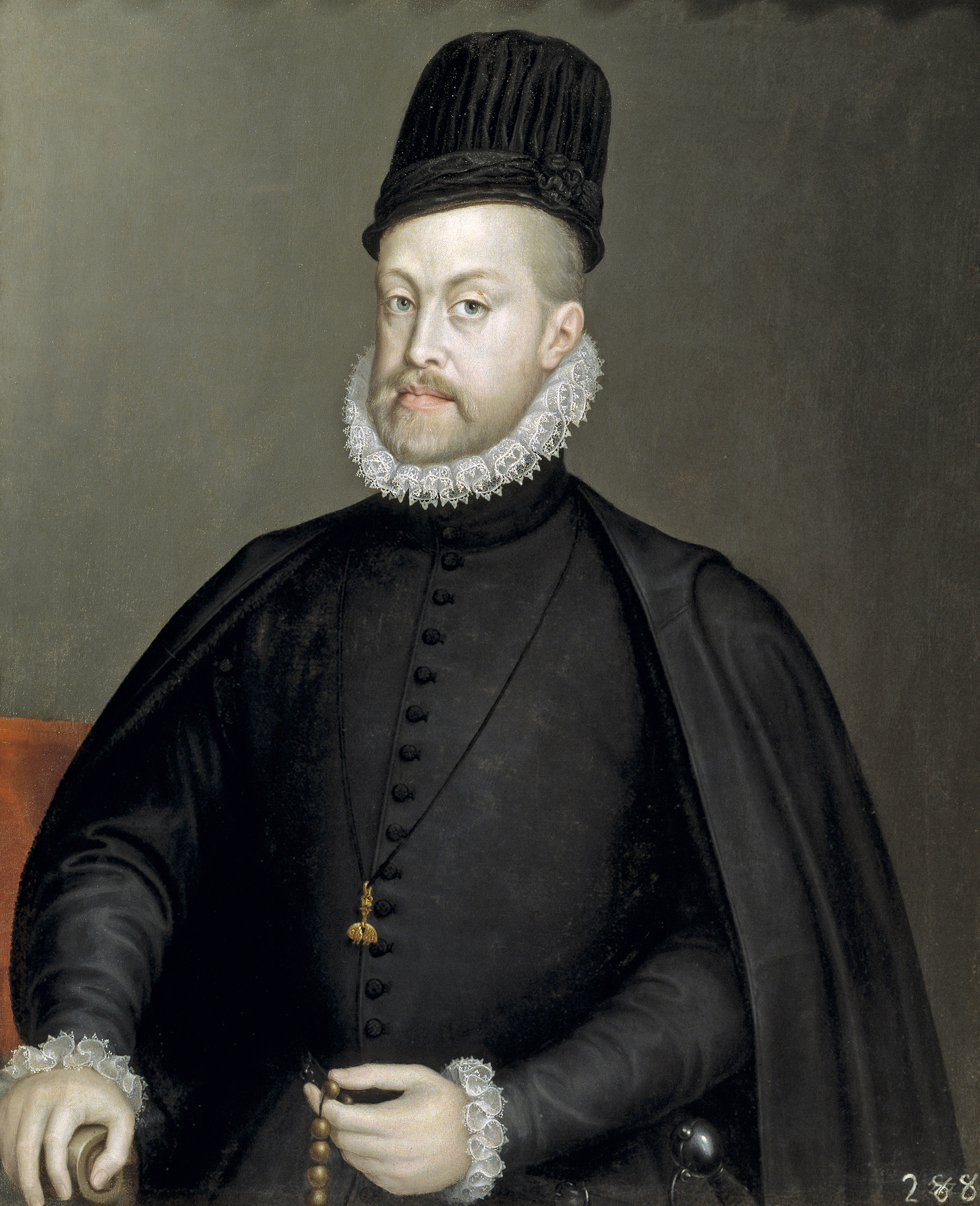
Philip II promoted different works in the towns near the monastery of El Escorial.

The Imperial Route runs through nine villages in Madrid, along two distinct routes and a central core. The first section, the first leg, starts from the city of Madrid to Torrelodones, Collado Villalba and Guadarrama. From here, access is gained to San Lorenzo de El Escorial and El Escorial, which form the main focus. The third stretch, the return, runs through Robledo de Chavela, Fresnedillas de la Oliva, Navalagamella and Valdemorillo, from where it returns to the capital.

Only some of these towns were part of the itinerary followed by Philip II, which partially coincided with the old Camino Real de Valladolid. Among them are Torrelodones, Collado Villalba (through the place known as La Venta) and Guadarrama, which, from the 16th century, saw an important hotel business flourish, aimed at travelers seeking rest on their journeys to San Lorenzo de El Escorial.

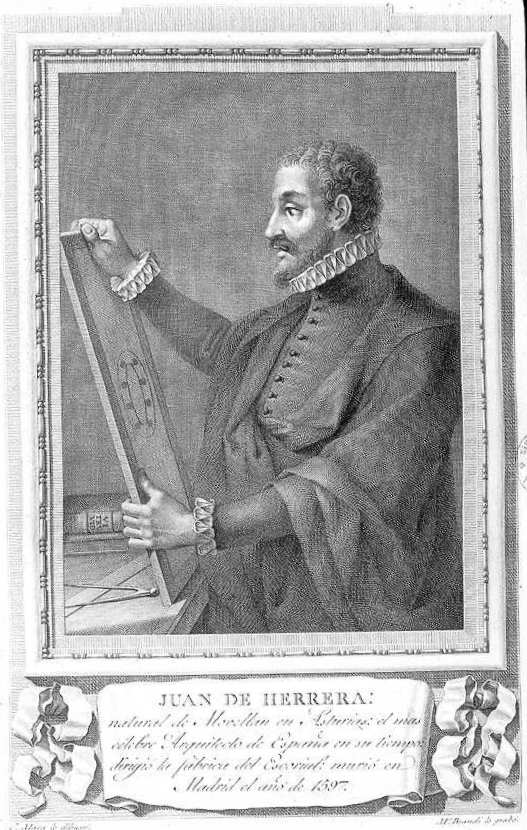
Juan de Herrera, architect of the Royal Monastery

The remaining municipalities, for the most part, have also been historically related to the Royal Monastery, either because they housed workers employed in its construction, or because they supplied the Court installed there, or because they gave religious coverage to those who came to the monastery works, through their churches. The result of this historical link is the existence, beyond San Lorenzo de El Escorial, of several buildings constructed by Juan de Herrera, the architect of the Monastery, or by his disciples.

In other towns included in the itinerary, there have not been such direct links with the Monastery, apart from its geographical proximity. Their presence in the Imperial Route aims to promote the development of a tourist industry, taking advantage of the fame achieved by the Royal Site. This is the case of Fresnedillas de la Oliva.

Conversely, some towns that Philip II visited on his travels are not included in the Imperial Route, as they are located outside the current route of the main roads. This includes Galapagar, a town on which a second, more direct road was built, starting from Torrelodones. Various engineering works, such as the construction of bridges and the improvement of the roadway, carried out shortly before the completion of the monastery, were sufficient for the monarch to opt for this new route.

Galapagar's connection with the Royal Foundation can be seen in the church of Nuestra Señora de la Asunción, which has touches of the Escorial style in the spire that crowns its tower. The ruins of the Casa Veleta, built by the king as a resting place, offer another example of the importance achieved by this municipality during the works of the Monastery.

== Artistic heritage ==
The Imperial Route is defined, in the artistic field, by Herrera architecture, a style that emerged in the Renaissance, which takes its name from Juan de Herrera, architect of the monastery of El Escorial. This work, promoted by King Philip II in the second half of the 16th century, left its mark on notable buildings of the Royal Site, as well as on its urban layout, in addition to some buildings in the towns that today form part of the tourist itinerary. These towns add buildings from before and after the 16th century, which complete the artistic offer of the Imperial Route.

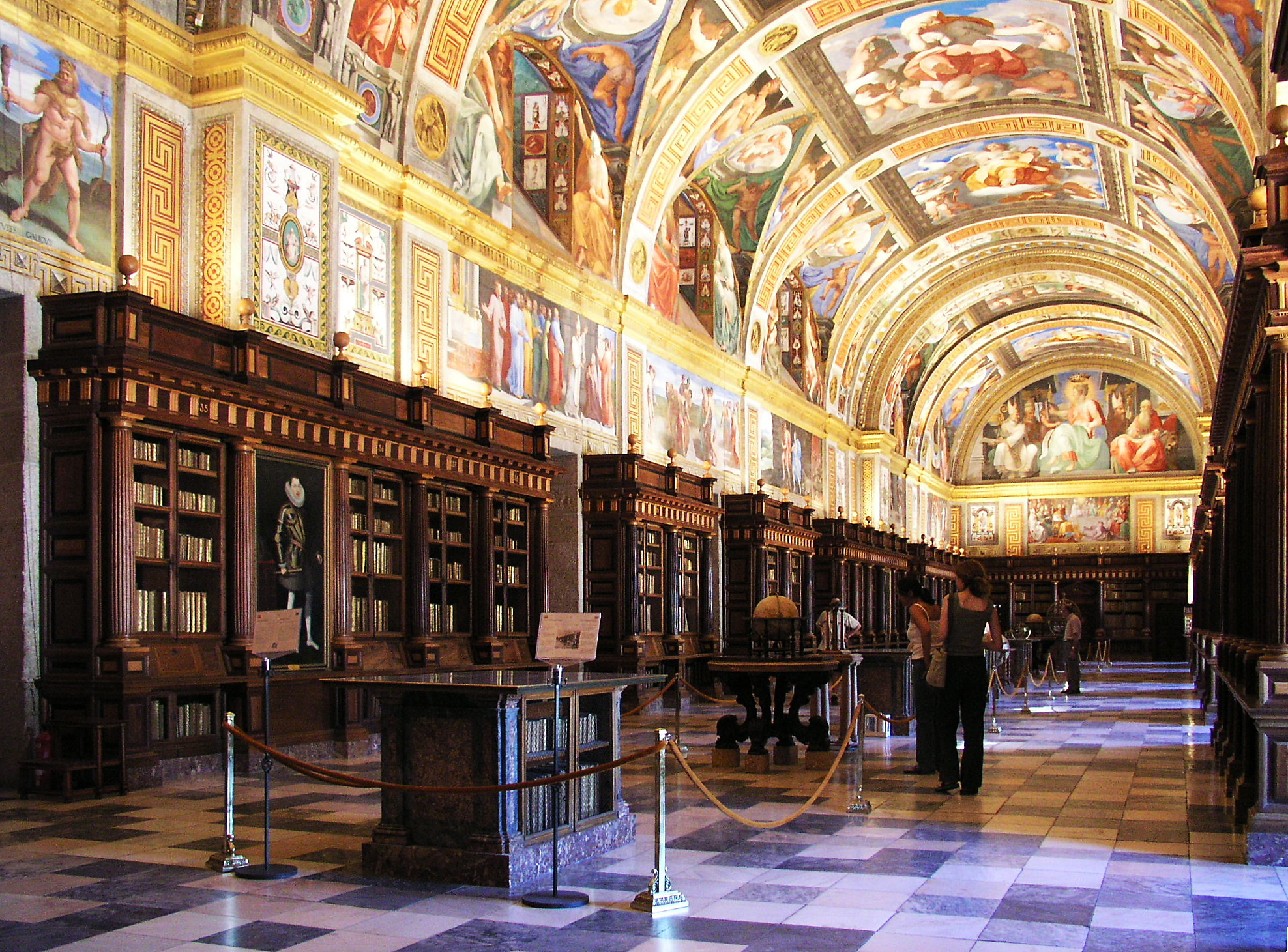
Royal Library of San Lorenzo de El Escorial, one of the most important places in the Monastery

=== The Herrerian style ===
The Royal Monastery was completed on September 13, 1584, after 21 years of work, based on an initial project by Juan Bautista de Toledo, continued, after his death, by Juan de Herrera. This is not the only Herrera construction to be found on the Imperial Route and in other areas of the Sierra de Guadarrama. This style quickly spread throughout the region, thanks to the benefits granted by the Spanish Royal House, aimed at remodeling buildings. The measure was intended to avoid depopulation and, at the same time, to promote a certain aesthetic unity.

One of the most characteristic features of the Herrerian style, the slate pyramidal spire with a pointed top, is present in the towers of the main churches of different localities in Guadarrama. Outside the tourist itinerary, we can mention those of Galapagar, initially built in the Gothic style, and Colmenarejo, which also shows traces of the Escorial style throughout its exterior.

Within the route, the Herrerian churches found here present a sober and imposing appearance, completely disproportionate to the size of the small towns where they are located, as is the case with the monastery of El Escorial itself.

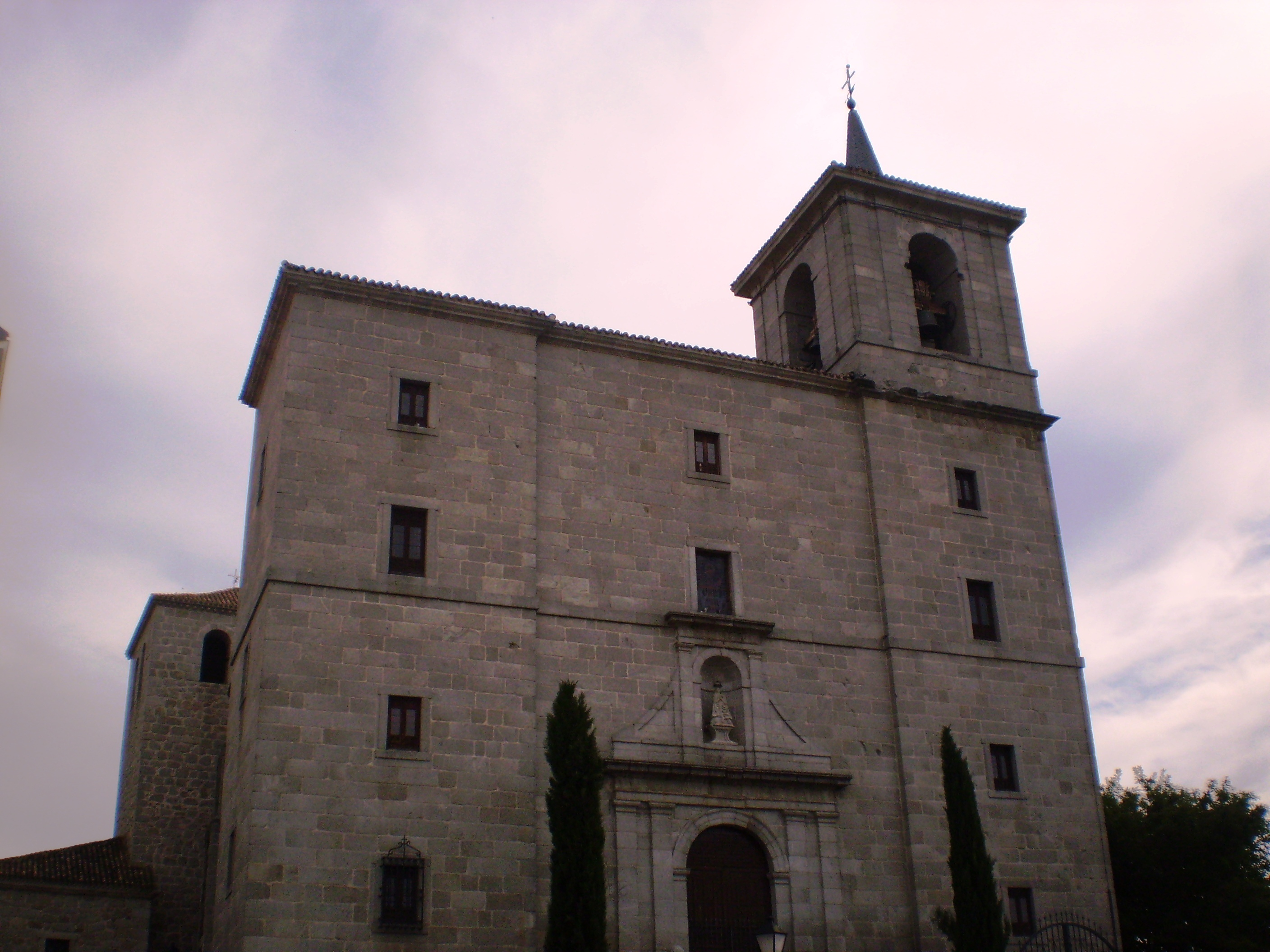
Church of Nuestra Señora de la Asunción, in Valdemorillo

The church of Nuestra Señora de la Asunción, in Valdemorillo, is one of the largest. Built in the 8th century as a mosque, it was transformed in later centuries. It still preserves Mozarabic remains on its north façade, as well as some Romanesque, Gothic (such as its ribbed vault) and Baroque elements (such as its sacristy). The reform promoted at the end of the 16th century and culminated in 1601 gave it a unitary aspect, clearly Herrerian. It was carried out by Bartolomé Elorriaga, a disciple of Juan de Herrera, who used granite stone ashlars.

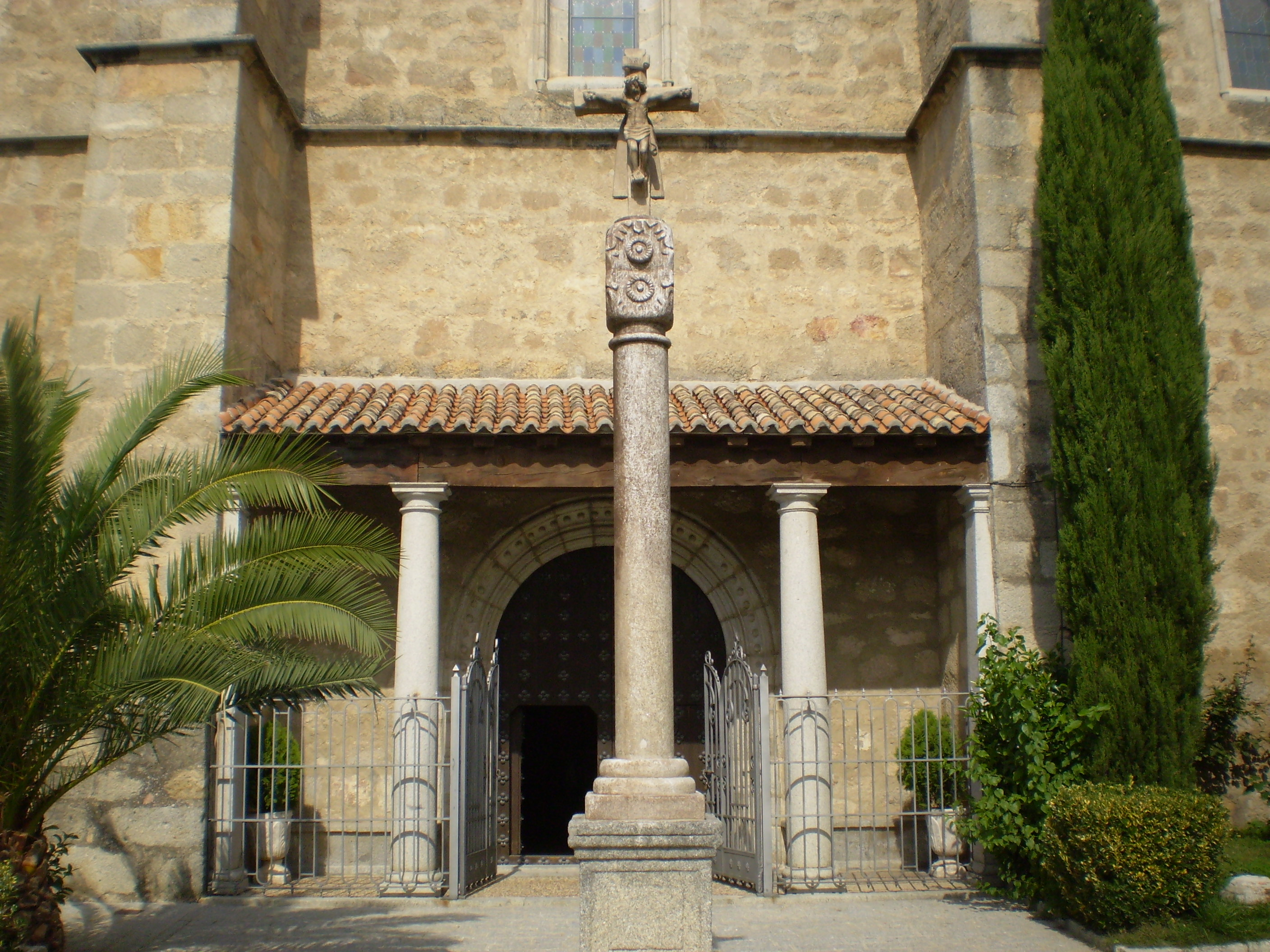
Church of Nuestra Señora de la Estrella, in Navalagamella

The church of Nuestra Señora de la Estrella, in Navalagamella, declared an Asset of Cultural Interest by the Community of Madrid, also stands out for its proportions. It was built in late Gothic style, as a fortified temple, as can still be seen in its thick buttresses. Like the church of Valdemorillo, it was remodeled in the 16th century, in line with the economic incentives granted by the Crown. The Herrerian features are present externally, especially in its main façade and in its tower, crowned by the characteristic spire. Its interior, however, maintains the original Gothic style. It is worth mentioning its ribbed vault.

The church of San Bernabé (16th century) is another notable example of Herrerian architecture. Unlike the two previous temples, it was erected entirely in this Renaissance style, without taking advantage of the remains of previous constructions. Its author was Francisco de Mora, a disciple of Juan de Herrera, who carried out the work in record time. It took only two years (1594–1595) to inaugurate this church of a single nave, crowned by a barrel vault, with transverse arches. It is located in El Escorial, whose term was chosen by Philip II to build the Royal Monastery and from which, in times of Charles III, the current municipality of San Lorenzo de El Escorial, where the aforementioned monument is located, was segregated.

Torrelodones also echoed the architectural trends of Juan de Herrera, who signed his last work during his lifetime in this town. This is the Real Aposento de Torrelodones, of which only the foundations are preserved. It was built to facilitate the rest of Philip II, in his travels from Madrid to San Lorenzo de El Escorial, by the Camino Real de Valladolid. In this village we also find the Fountain of El Caño (16th century), a work of monumental nature that the neighbors financed to make the Court's stay more pleasant. The Herrerian influence is notable.

The need for lodging became evident while the Royal Monastery was being built. In this regard, the monastery of Prestado, located in El Escorial, stands out, although the building is much older than the 16th century. It was reconverted to adapt it as a place of residence for Philip II, who lived there intermittently during the 21 years that the works lasted. It is an old mountain mansion, which, in its renovation, incorporated certain Herrerian elements.

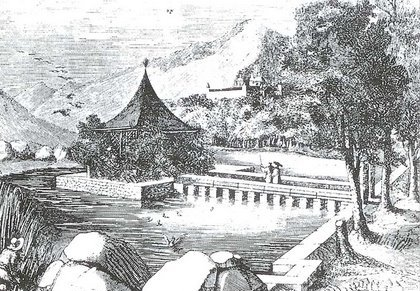
Pond in La Granjilla de La Fresneda (El Escorial), in a drawing from 1862

Without leaving this municipality, the site of La Granjilla de La Fresneda gathers a palace and a convent also ascribed to this style, in addition to a Renaissance garden that integrates four ponds, fed by the Aulencia river. It is located on a 148-hectare (370-acre) estate, which is in private hands. It is one of the most significant Herrerian monuments in the Community of Madrid and, at the same time, the most unknown. It was designed by Juan Bautista de Toledo, following the model used in the Casa de Campo in Madrid.

In San Lorenzo de El Escorial, bordering the Lonja del Monasterio, are located the First and Second Casa de Oficios and the Casa de la Compaña, intended to house the various workers and service personnel of the Royal Monastery. The first two were designed by Juan de Herrera and the third by Francisco de Mora between 1587 and 1596.

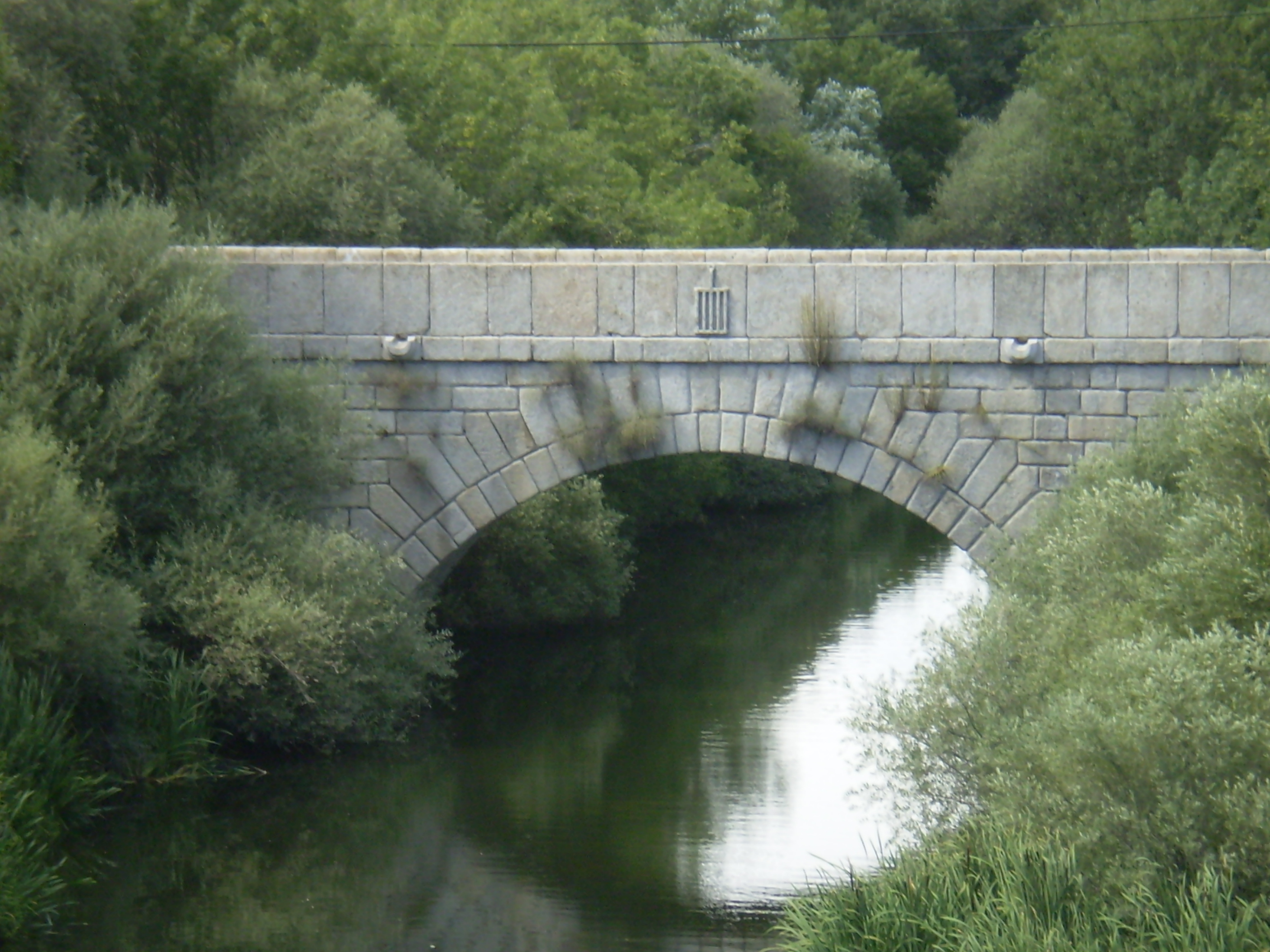
The New Bridge, over the Guadarrama River, opened a new route to the monastery of El Escorial, through Galapagar.

Two centuries later, Juan de Villanueva enclosed the perimeter of the Lonja with the Third Casa de Oficios and the Casas de Infantes, the latter of which served as the dwelling of the First Secretary of State, the Count of Floridablanca. Despite the passage of time, Villanueva was faithful to the style that presides over the entire complex. This architect was also responsible for the urban reorganization of the hamlet that arose behind the Lonja and, in its network of squares and streets, he maintained the Herrerian imprint.

During the construction of the Royal Foundation, important engineering works were also undertaken on different roads. This is the case of the New Bridge, ordered to be erected by the monarch in 1583, a year before the completion of the monastery. It is located over the Guadarrama River, near Torrelodones, although in the municipality of Galapagar. This work was decisive, as it opened a more direct route than the Camino Real de Valladolid, through the aforementioned town. The bridge has the famous Escorial-style grill on both sides, which links it directly to the monastery. It has a single semicircular arch, topped at each end by cutwaters on each side, which resembles the bridge of Segovia, in Madrid, built by the school of Juan de Herrera or, probably, by Herrera himself.

=== Other styles ===
In addition to the Herrerian buildings that appear on the Imperial Route, there are several constructions of different centuries and styles. The architectural currents best represented are late Gothic, present in the main church of Robledo de Chavela, and neoclassicism, which is concentrated mainly in the Royal Site. In addition, there are two 20th-century monuments without a defined style: the Valley of the Fallen and the palace of Canto del Pico.

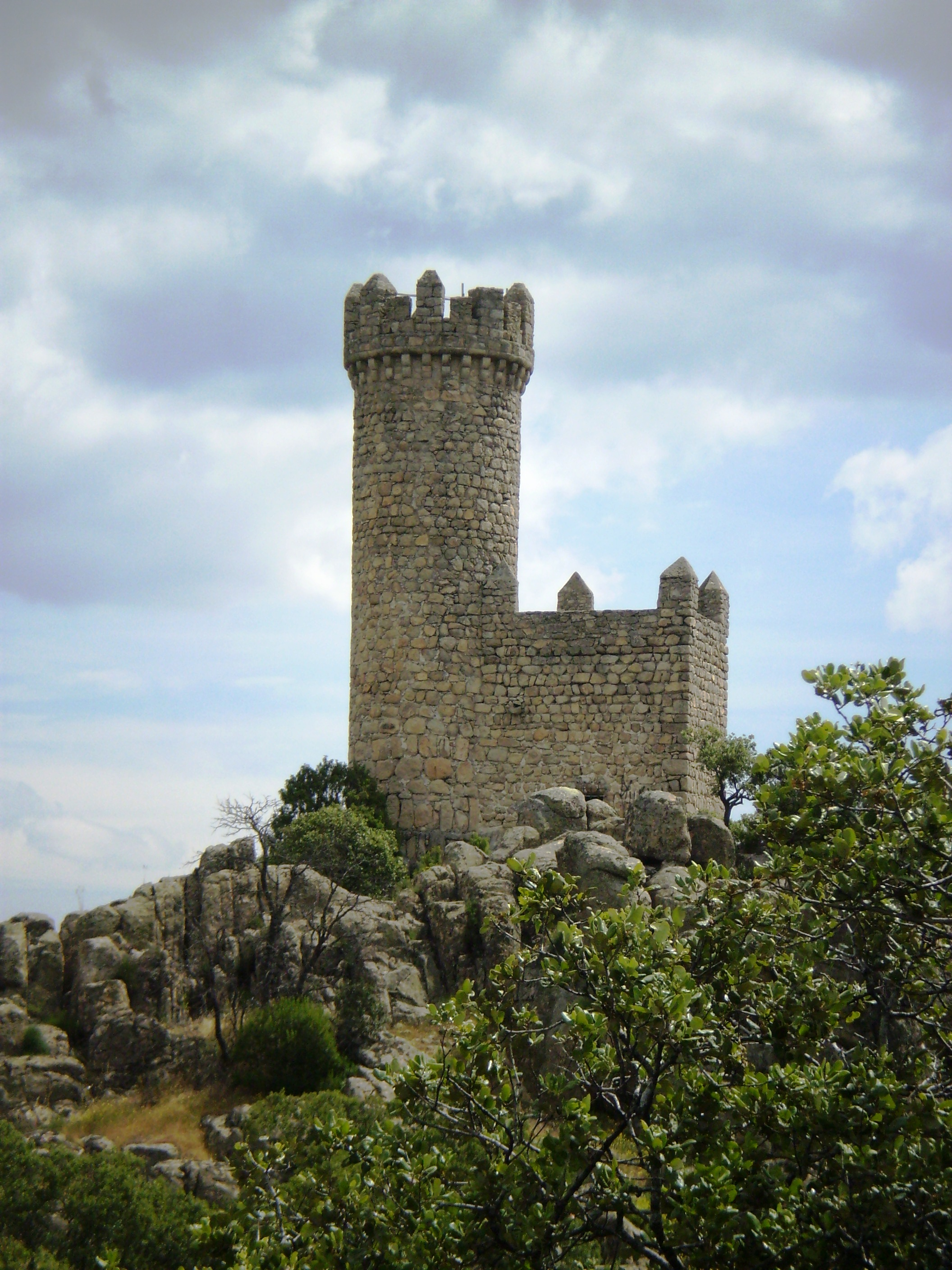
The Torrelodones watchtower was built in the 9th century.

The area, which suffered a strong degree of depopulation during the Early Middle Ages, practically lacks relevant monuments prior to the 15th century, when the Gothic, in its later version, penetrated the Madrid side of the Sierra de Guadarrama. Among the pre-medieval constructions, the Seat of Philip II, in San Lorenzo de El Escorial, stands out, perhaps the oldest human footprint of the Imperial Route. According to tradition, it was ordered to be carved on a natural rock by the monarch, who used it as an observatory of the works of the monastery. However, recent research suggests that it may be a Vetton altar.

The Torrelodones watchtower, of Muslim origin, is the next oldest building. It is located on top of a hill and is visible from the A-6 highway (Madrid-A Coruña). It was built in the 9th century as a tower to watch for possible Christian incursions.

The abandoned village of Navalquejigo, in the municipality of El Escorial, houses a small church dating from the late 12th or early 13th century, which is in a ruinous state. It belongs to the group of fortified repopulation churches of the Sierra de Guadarrama.

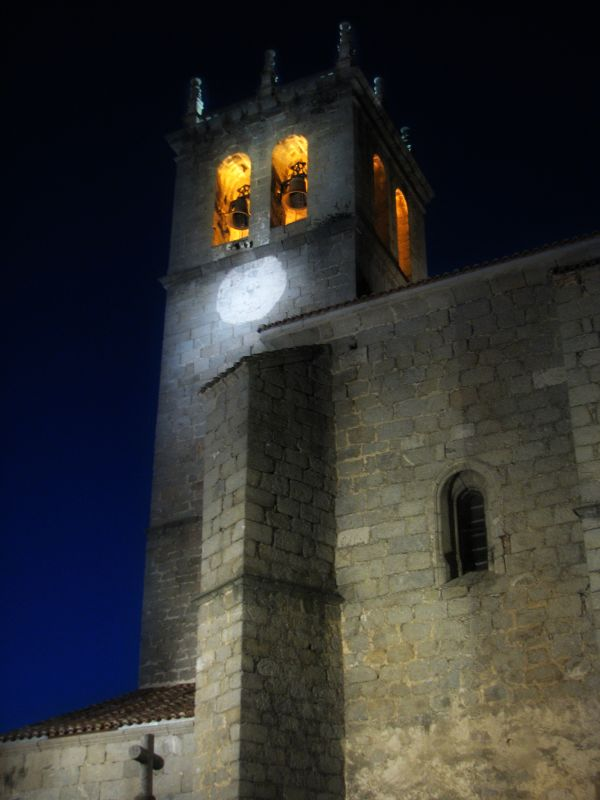
Night view of the church of the Asunción de Nuestra Señora, in Robledo de Chavela

The Torreón de Fuentelámparas, located in Robledo de Chavela, probably dates from the 14th century. Little is known about its origin, although it is assumed that it was used to watch over pasture lands.

This village is home to the best example of late Gothic architecture on the Imperial Route. It is the church of the Asunción de Nuestra Señora (the Assumption), the construction of which began in the 15th century. The church, which has a fortified appearance, houses a segmented baptismal font, a carving attributed to Alonso Berruguete and an altarpiece by Antonio Rincón, painter to the chamber of the Catholic Monarchs.

In the parish churches after the 15th century, there are slight Renaissance touches combined with regional elements, characteristic of the rural architecture of Guadarrama. This is the case with the church of San Bartolomé, in Fresnedillas de la Oliva, from the 16th century, which has a single nave and a choir supported by 17th-century columns, and also of the church of El Enebral (17th century), of Collado Villalba, decorated externally with stone balls, a very frequent ornamental resource in the constructions of the mountain chain. In its interior there is a Romanesque arch. In Torrelodones, it is worth mentioning the church of the Asunción de Nuestra Señora, from the 16th century.

Collado Villalba, the most populated town on this tourist itinerary, with around 60,000 inhabitants, also preserves other reminders of its rural past. The Piedra del Concejo, used since the 17th century as a meeting place for town councillors, is located in the main square of the old town.

The 18th century left two important examples of neoclassical architecture. Both are due to Juan de Villanueva, author of both the Casita del Infante (or de Arriba), in San Lorenzo de El Escorial, and the Casita del Príncipe (or de Abajo), in El Escorial. They were erected as recreational pavilions for royalty. The gardens laid out around the latter palace are among the most important of Madrid's neoclassicism.

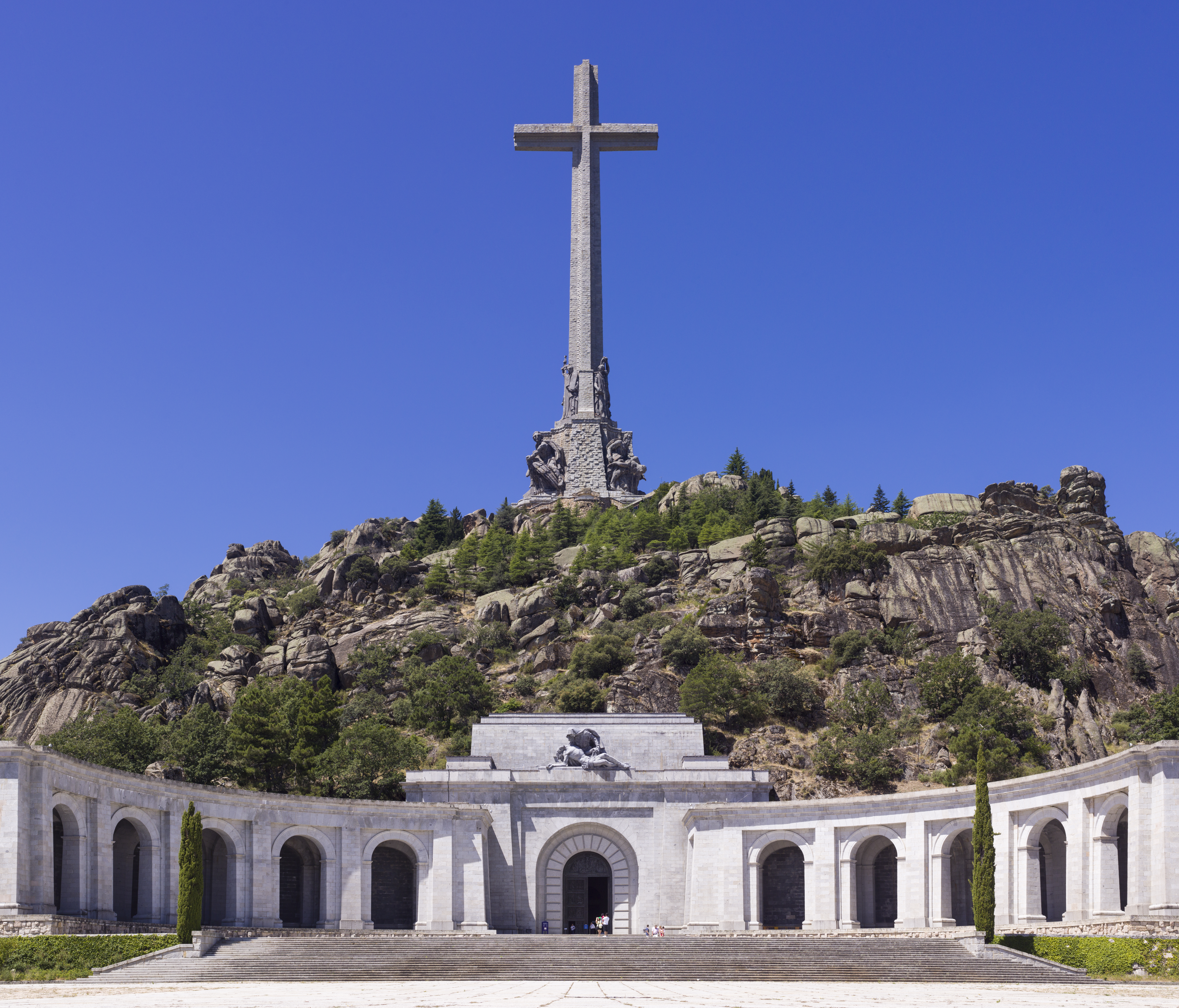
The Valley of the Fallen, in San Lorenzo de El Escorial, is one of the most visited monuments of the Imperial Route.

Guadarrama also has several 18th-century buildings. Of note are the church of San Miguel Arcángel, the Fuente de Piedra, begun in 1785 in Baroque style, and the Puente del Rosario, built in the time of Charles III over the Guadarrama River.

The Imperial Route includes the Valley of the Fallen, in the vicinity of San Lorenzo de El Escorial, the most important 20th-century construction on the itinerary. This funerary monument, erected between 1940 and 1958, is located in the area known as Cuelgamuros. It consists of a basilica, carved into the stone, an abbey, an inn and a 150 m (490 ft) high cross, which crowns the Risco de la Nava (1,390 m; 4,560 ft). The base of the cross is guarded by four large sculptures (approximately 18 m; 59 ft), representing the evangelists, the work of Juan de Avalos. It is one of the most visited destinations on the Imperial Route.

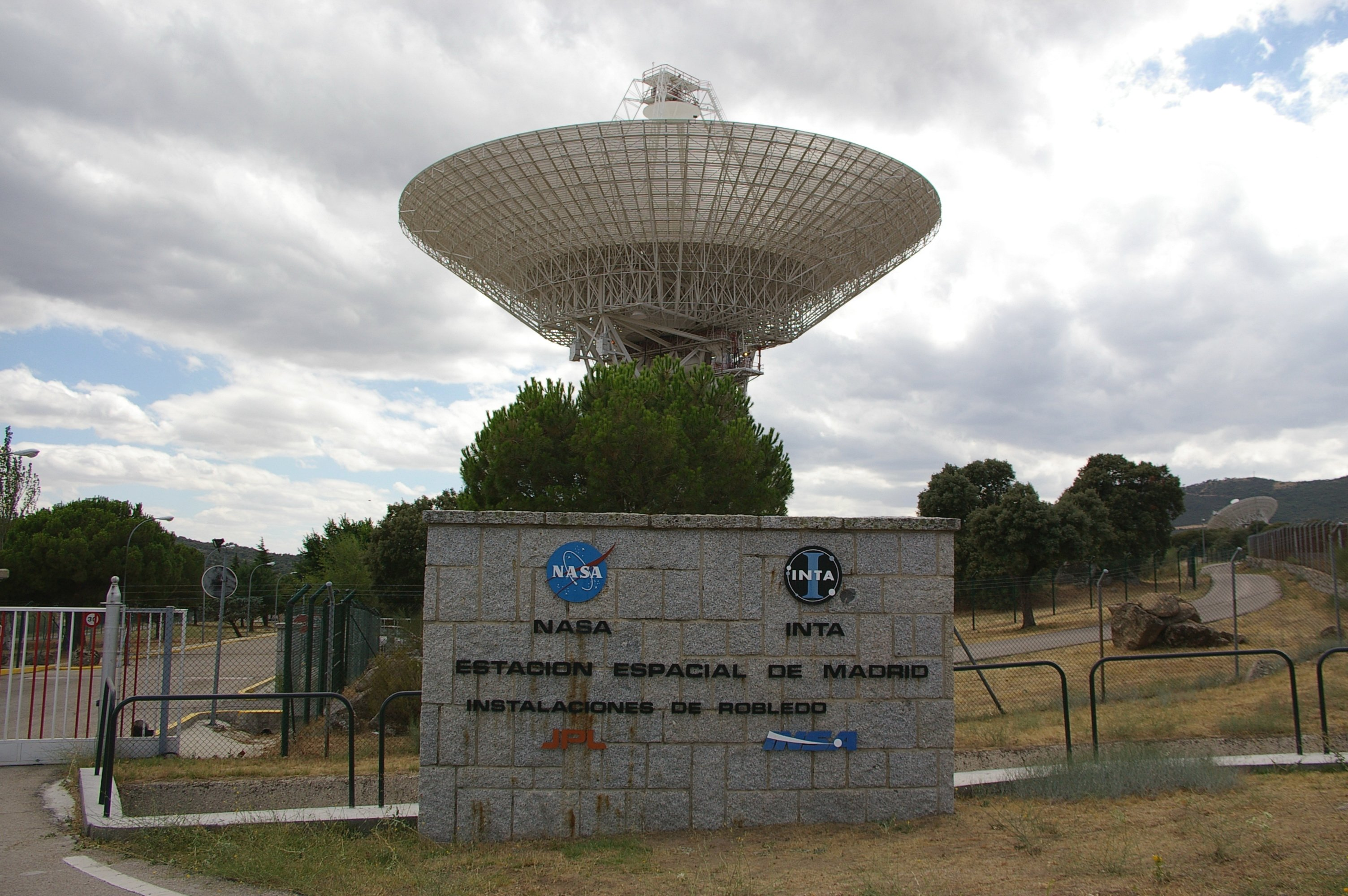
The Aerospace Base of Robledo de Chavela, one of the tourist attractions of the Route

Another 20th-century construction is the Palace of Canto del Pico, which presides over a mountain over 1,000 m (3,300 ft) high in the municipality of Torrelodones. This building, which presents certain modernist touches, was conceived as a house museum. Different architectural elements from various Spanish monuments are integrated into its structure.

Near Fresnedillas de la Oliva, although in the municipality of Robledo de Chavela, is the NASA Aerospace Base and the National Institute for Aerospace Technology (INTA), in operation since 1967. Some of its antennae reach up to 70 m (230 ft) in diameter.

== Natural heritage ==
The Imperial Route crosses different natural spaces, which have received different levels of protection by the Community of Madrid. It partially crosses two Regional Parks, a Natural Monument and a Paraje Pintoresco, as well as other areas, not legally protected, of great scenic and environmental value.

In its first section (Torrelodones-Collado Villalba-Guadarrama), it runs through one of the western ends of the Cuenca Alta del Manzanares Regional Park, which partially includes the first two municipalities. These are bordered by the Sierra de Hoyo de Manzanares, one of the sites of this protected area, populated by holm oak and pine trees.

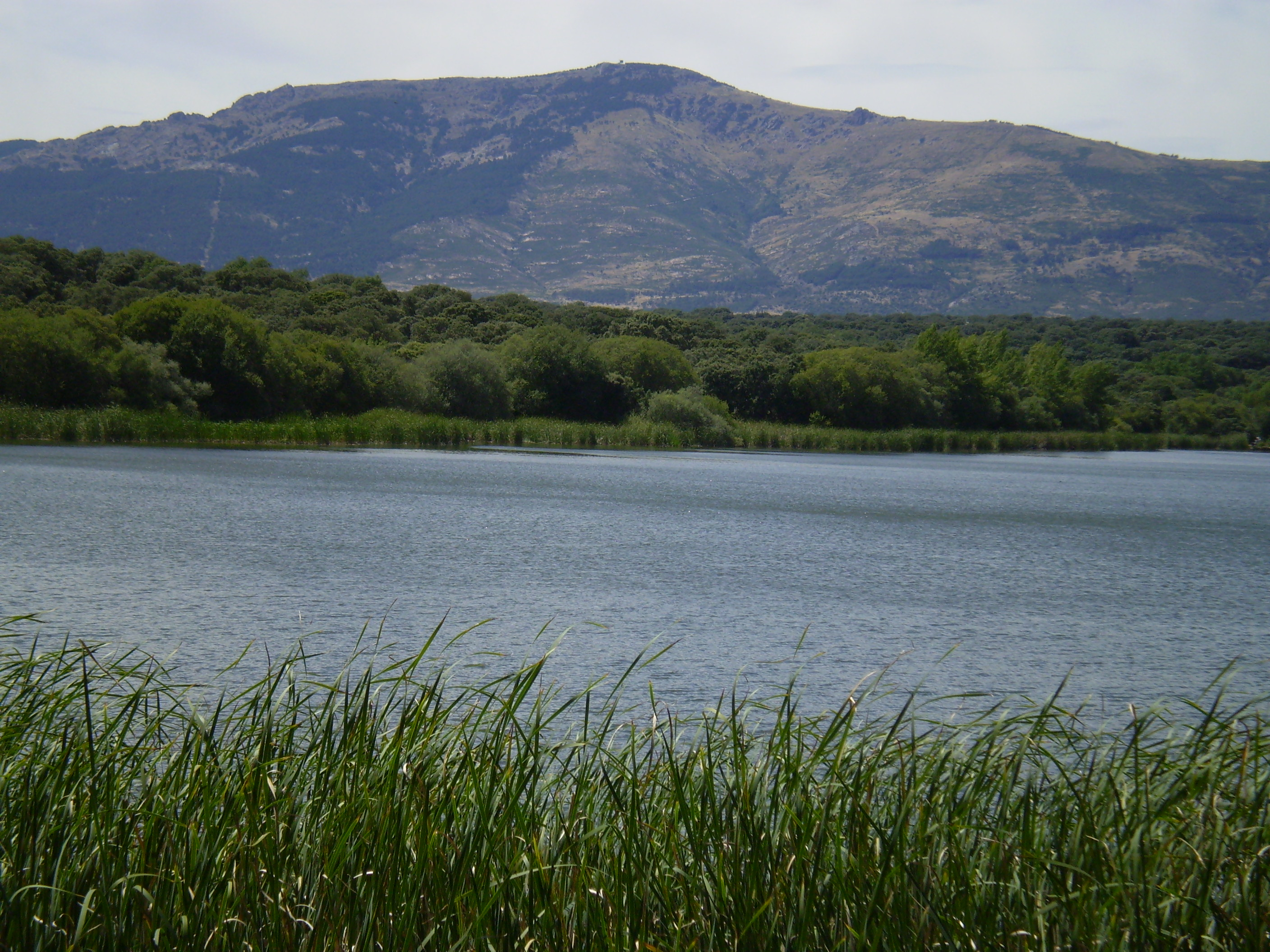
Mount Abantos, from the Los Arroyos reservoir

In addition, part of Torrelodones is within the Regional Park of the middle course of the Guadarrama River and its surroundings, although it is far from the A-6 (Madrid-A Coruña highway), along which the Imperial Route runs in its first section.

The Peñas del Arcipreste Natural Monument is located in Guadarrama. Several phrases dedicated to Juan Ruiz, the Archpriest of Hita, author of the famous serranillas, so called in direct allusion to the Sierra de Guadarrama, where this author was inspired, have been engraved on this rock, which appears to the east of the Puerto de los Leones.

In the central nucleus of the Route (San Lorenzo de El Escorial-El Escorial), we find the Paraje Pintoresco del Pinar de Abantos y Zona de La Herrería. On the southwestern slope of Mount Abantos (1,753 m; 5,751 ft) stands the Royal Monastery and in its northern part is the Valley of the Fallen. Its pine, oak and holm oak forests are home to populations of roe deer, as well as two species of butterflies, protected in the Community of Madrid.

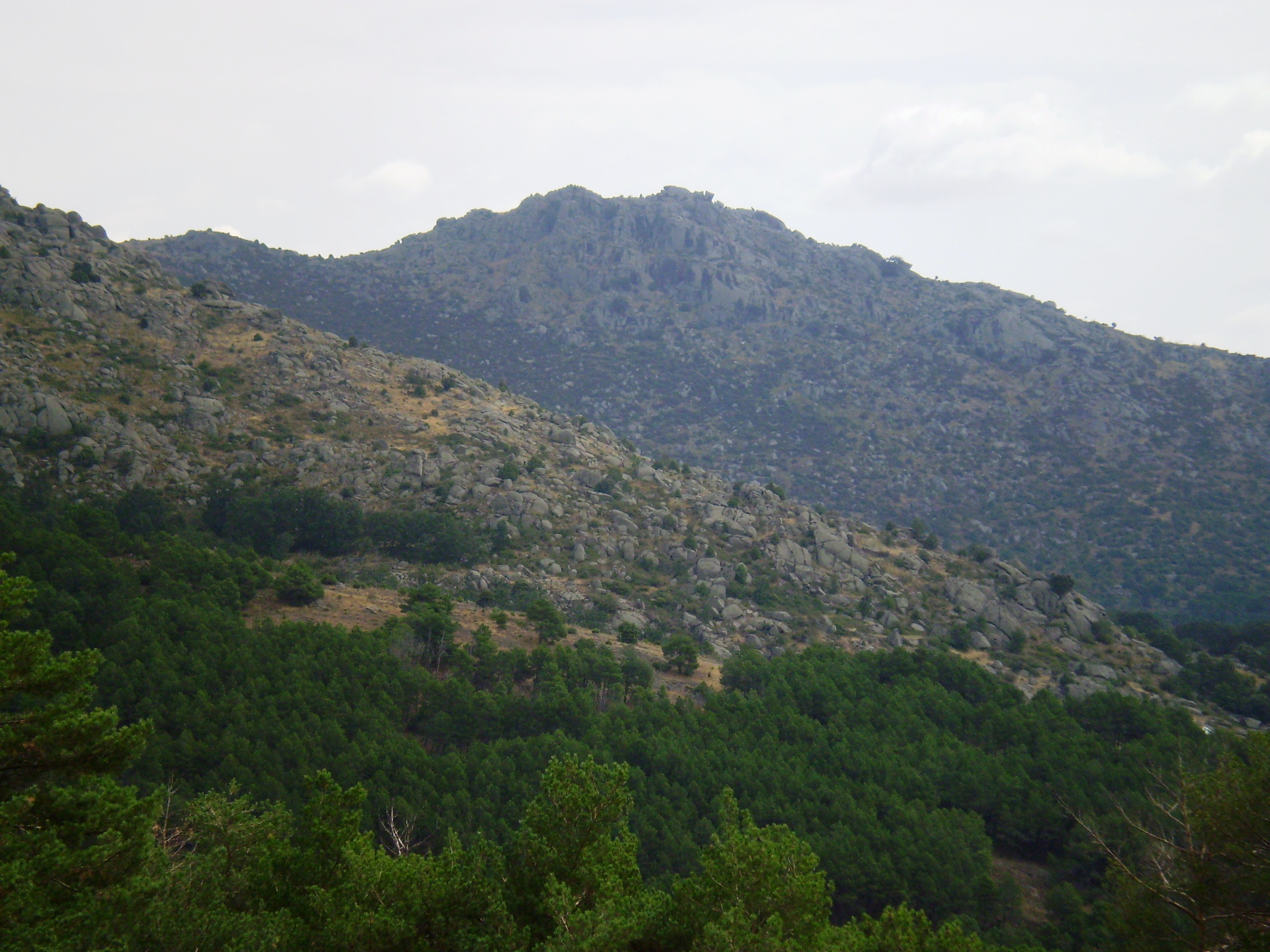
Las Machotas close the so-called Circo de El Escorial at its southern end.

La Herrería, on the other hand, has a great historical importance, since, in the 16th century, it was part of the so-called Fence of Philip II, which delimited different estates used for the leisure and recreation of the monarch. The oak and ash groves make up the vegetation of this place, mainly in the form of dehesa. Nearby is the mountain of Las Machotas, which closes the southern end of the so-called Circo de El Escorial.

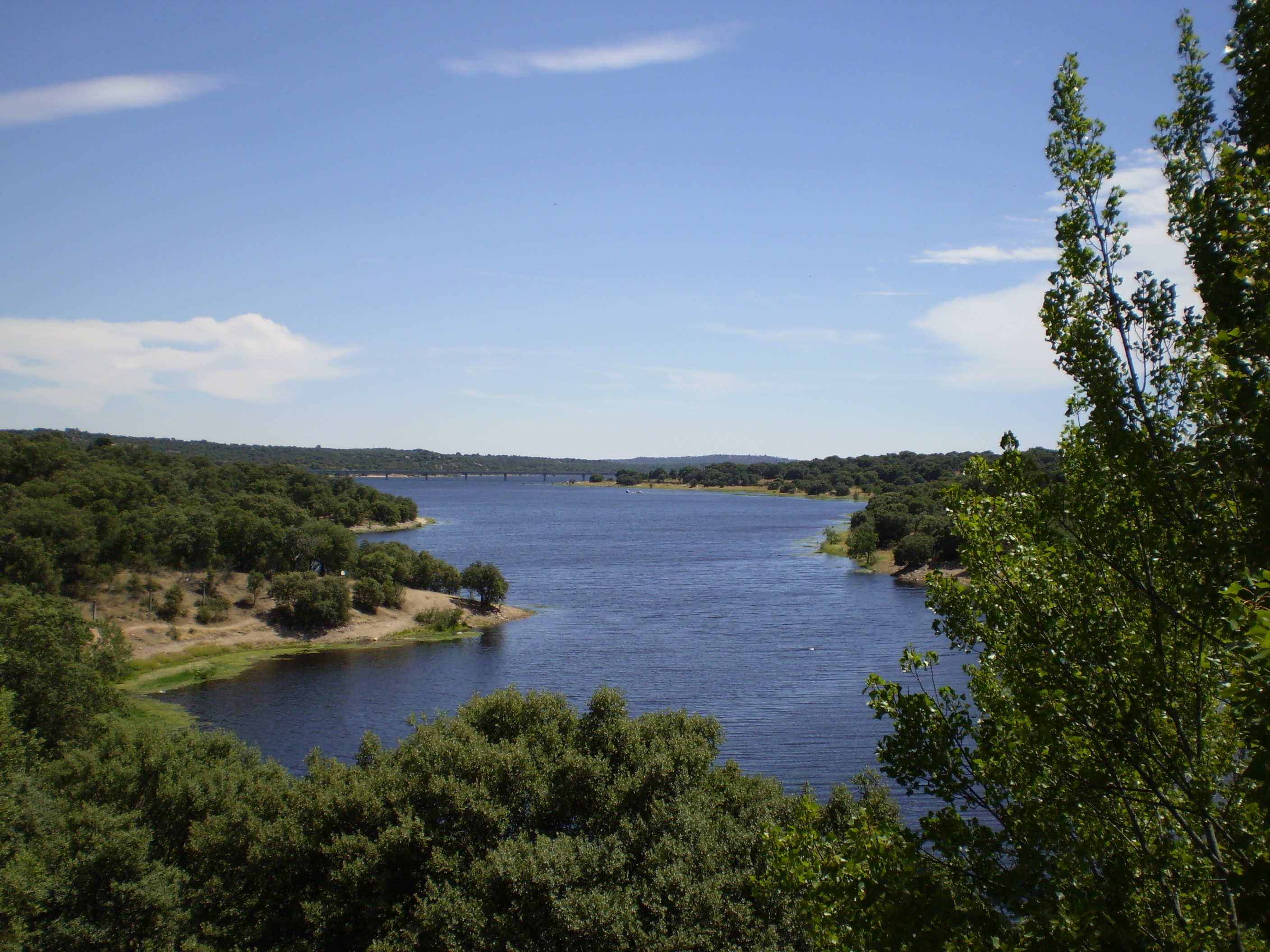
Partial view of the Valmayor reservoir

The third and last section of the Imperial Route (Robledo de Chavela-Fresnedillas de la Oliva-Navalagamella-Valdemorillo) encounters three rivers of scenic and environmental interest. Through the first municipality flow the Cofio and the Perales, the latter river also passing through Navalagamella. Both flow into the Alberche.

The mountains of San Benito (1,626 m; 5,335 ft), La Almenara (1,259 m; 4,131 ft) and Almojón (1,178 m; 3,865 ft) are other natural attractions in this area.

Further south, in Valdemorillo, the Aulencia —a tributary of the Guadarrama— forms the most important wetland of the Imperial Route and one of the most significant in the region, the Valmayor reservoir. This reservoir is included in the Regional Park of the middle course of the Guadarrama river and its surroundings.

== See also ==
- Herrerian style

San Lorenzo de El Escorial y El Escorial

- Casita del Príncipe
- Casita del Infante
- La Granjilla de La Fresneda de El Escorial
- Church of San Bernabé
- El Escorial
- Valley of the Fallen

Torrelodones

- Watchtower of Torrelodones
- Palace of Canto del Pico
