= Madrid Deep Space Communications Complex =

Deep-space communications complex in Spain

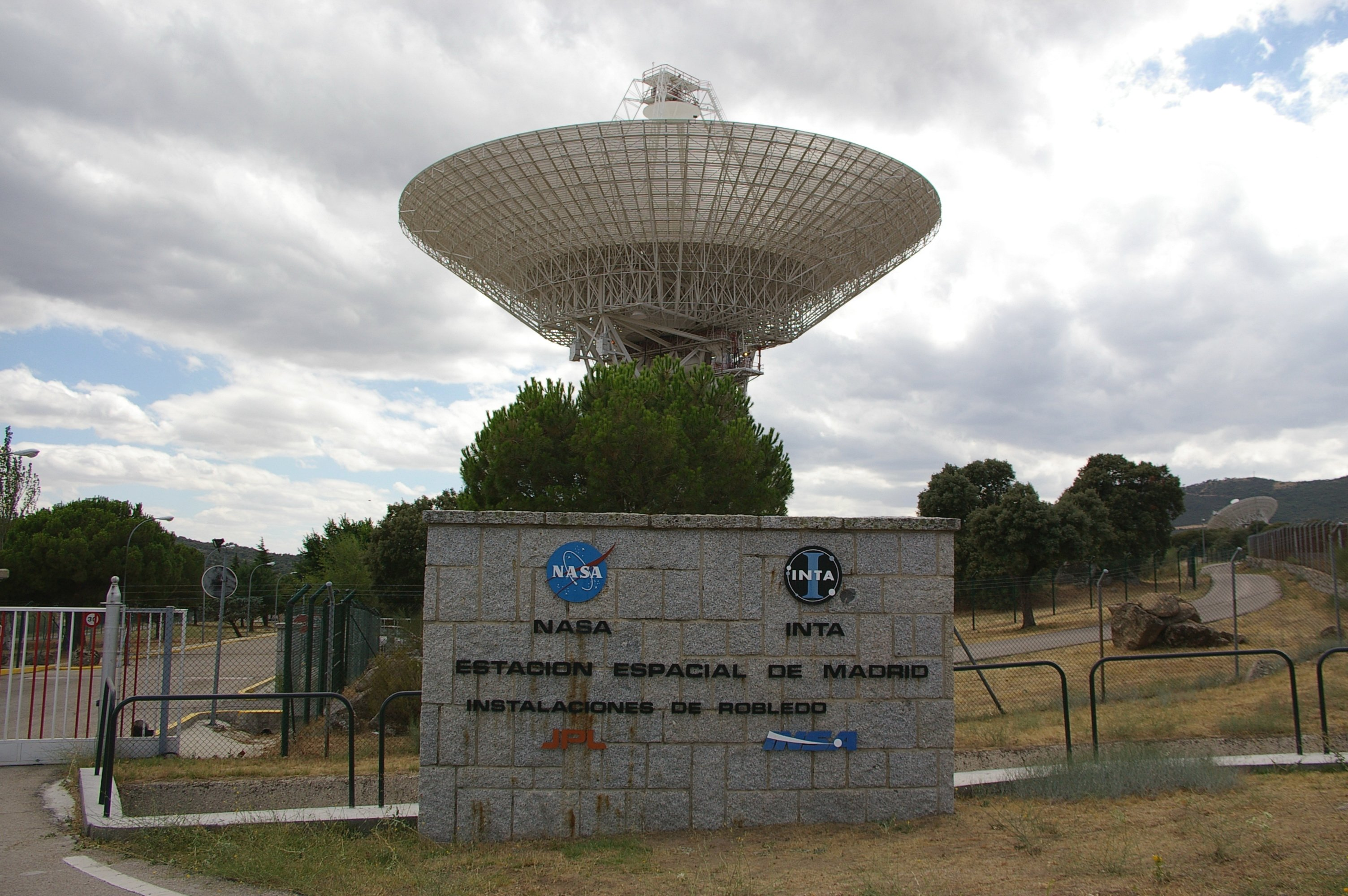
- View of the Madrid Deep Space Communications Complex, with DSS-63 in the background
- Alternative names: MDSCC
- Organization: Instituto Nacional de Técnica Aeroespacial (INTA)
- Location: Robledo de Chavela, Community of Madrid, Spain
- Coordinates: 40°25′45″N 4°14′59″W
- Established: 1964
- Website: mdscc.nasa.gov
- Telescopes: DSS 53; DSS 54; DSS 55; DSS 56; DSS 63; DSS 65
- Related media on Commons

The Madrid Deep Space Communications Complex (MDSCC; Spanish: Complejo de Comunicaciones de Espacio Profundo de Madrid) is a deep-space communications complex in Robledo de Chavela, near Madrid, Spain. It is a Deep Space Network installation in Spain managed by the Instituto Nacional de Técnica Aeroespacial (INTA) under bilateral cooperation between Spain and the United States in support of NASA. The complex forms one of the three sites of NASA's Deep Space Network (DSN), together with the complexes at Goldstone, California, and the Canberra complex in Australia. It also supports radio astronomy and very-long-baseline interferometry, including participation in the European VLBI Network (EVN).

== History ==
=== Origins and establishment ===
Following site surveys by NASA and INTA in 1963, Spain and the United States signed a memorandum on 29 January 1964 providing for the construction and operation of a tracking and data-acquisition station for space vehicles west of Madrid. Construction began soon afterwards, and the station entered service in July 1965 in time to receive the images returned by Mariner 4.

The original Robledo station was equipped with a single 26 m parabolic antenna. According to ESA's historical study, a second, 64 m antenna entered service in 1973, the original antenna was later enlarged to 34 m, the 64 m antenna was enlarged to 70 m in 1986, and additional 34 m antennas entered service in 1987 and 1997. NASA states that DSS-61, the original Robledo antenna, was upgraded from 26 m to 34 m in 1980.

=== Transfer to Spanish operation ===
Spanish participation in the complex was substantial from the outset. According to ESA's historical account, NASA transferred responsibility for operating the Robledo complex to INTA on 3 March 1970.

After the nearby Fresnedillas de la Oliva station closed in 1985, its antenna was relocated to the Robledo complex.

=== Public outreach and modernization ===
A Centro de entrenamiento y visitantes (CEV; Training and Visitors Center), inaugurated in 2002, supports educational outreach in Spain, STEM promotion, and public dissemination related to the Deep Space Network.

In the early 2020s, the Madrid complex became the first of the three DSN sites to complete its then-current antenna-capacity expansion. Deep Space Station 56 (DSS-56), a 34 m antenna built at the Madrid complex from 2017 onward, entered service in early 2021. NASA described it as the first DSN antenna able to use the network's full range of communication frequencies as soon as it went online. It was followed by DSS-53, another 34 m antenna, which became operational in February 2022. JPL described this as making Madrid the first of the three DSN sites to complete its build-out under NASA's antenna-enhancement effort.

=== July 2026 wildfires ===
On 24 July 2026, the site was affected by the 2026 Spain wildfires. Along with 60,000 other local inhabitants, the staff were evacuated when the fire was approaching the site. Preliminary inspections revealed that no significant damage was caused to either this site or the nearby Cebreros Station, though further inspections will be needed to check for less obvious problems.

== Role within the Deep Space Network ==
The MDSCC is one of the three ground complexes of NASA's Deep Space Network. NASA and JPL describe the DSN sites at Madrid, Goldstone and Canberra as being spaced roughly 120 degrees apart in longitude so that spacecraft can remain in view of at least one complex as the Earth rotates.

The 2024 bilateral agreement states that Spain provides the land and rights of way in the municipalities of Robledo de Chavela and Navas del Rey, while the United States bears the costs of construction, equipment and operation. It also provides for operational responsibility to be delegated through contracts with INTA or the Spanish Space Agency.

== Facilities and antennas ==
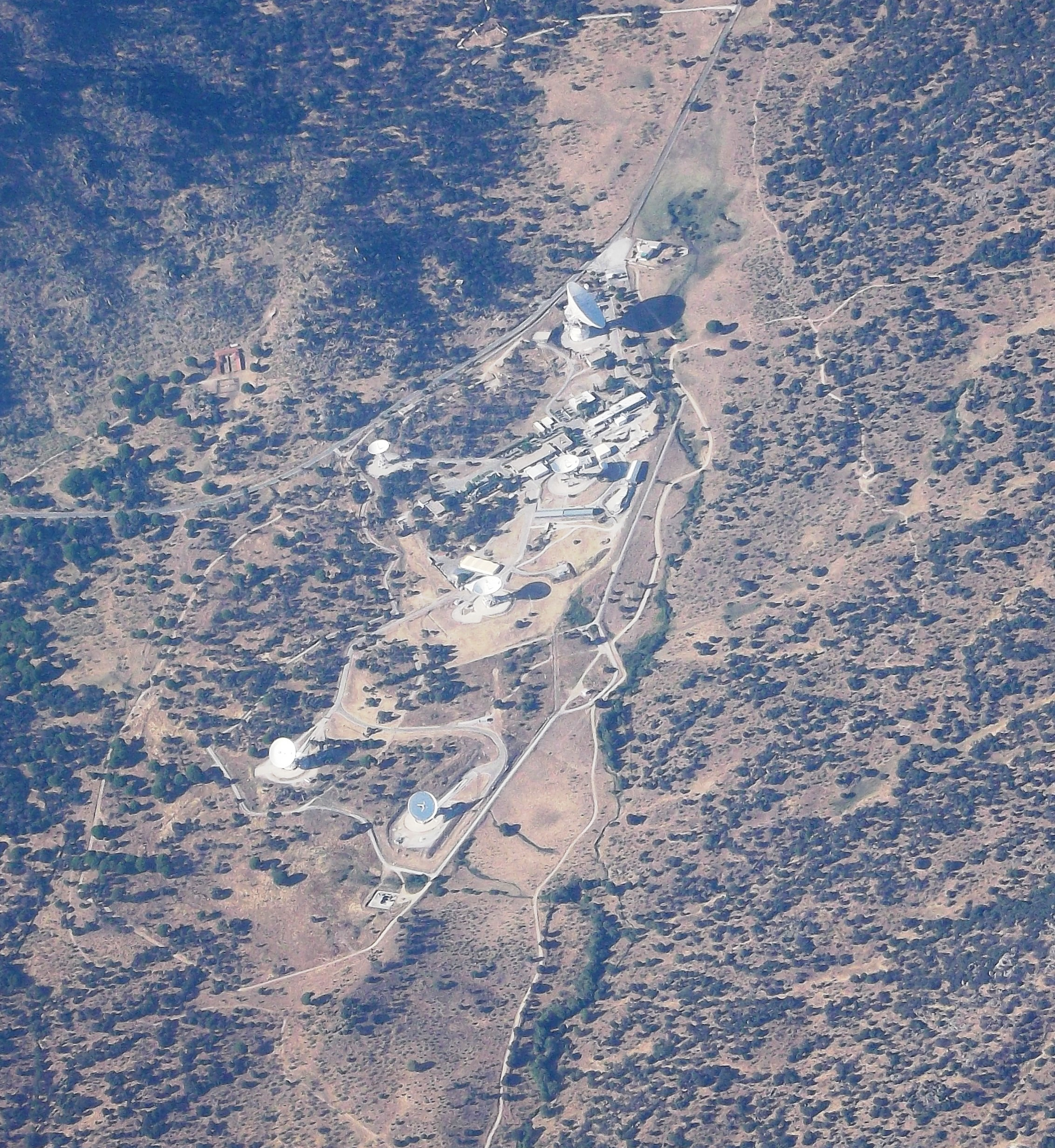
Aerial view of the complex in Robledo de Chavela

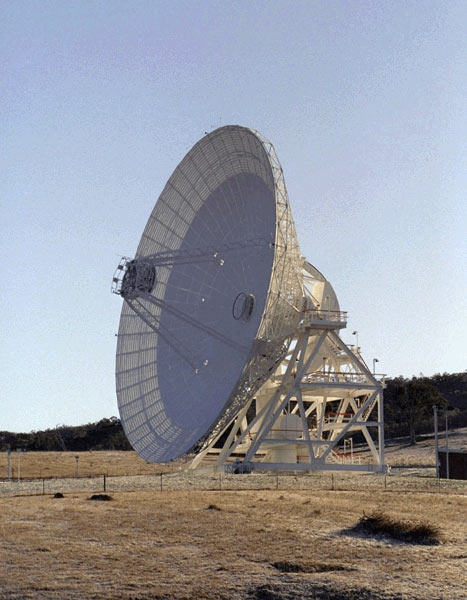
34 m beam-waveguide antenna at the Madrid complex

According to the 2024 revision of the DSN Telecommunications Link Design Handbook, the current antennas at Madrid are DSS-53, DSS-54, DSS-55, DSS-56, DSS-63 and DSS-65. In that handbook, DSS-53, DSS-54, DSS-55 and DSS-56 are listed as 34 m beam-waveguide antennas, DSS-63 as a 70 m antenna, and DSS-65 as a 34 m high-efficiency antenna. The 2024 Spain–United States agreement describes the station more generally as comprising one 70 m antenna, four 34 m beam-waveguide antennas and one 34 m Cassegrain antenna, and adds that a new 34 m tower was under construction at the station.

A former Robledo antenna, DSS-61, was completed in 1965 in time to support Mariner 4. NASA states that it was upgraded from 26 m to 34 m in 1980 and retired in 1999, after which it was repurposed for the educational PARTNeR project.

== Radio astronomy ==
In addition to spacecraft communications, antennas at Robledo are used for radio astronomy. The DSN Radio Astronomy User Guide states that DSN antennas can be used either in a stand-alone capacity or as part of a very-long-baseline interferometry observation. The same guide documents radio astronomy capability at Madrid including K-band observations with DSS-63 and a Q-band receiving system on DSS-54.

The CAB/INTA-CSIC radio astronomy programme states that the Robledo antennas participate in the European VLBI Network and may be requested either for single-dish observing or for VLBI observations that include one of the Robledo antennas.

== Mission support and milestones ==
ESA's historical study describes the Robledo complex as a long-standing element of NASA's Deep Space Network and notes its support for missions including Mariner 4, Apollo-era operations, and the outer-planet missions of the late twentieth century. The same study also notes support for NASA missions carried out in cooperation with ESA and Germany, as well as critical phases of some ESA missions such as Giotto.

According to an INTA press release marking the 60th anniversary of the 1964 agreement, the complex has supported missions including Cassini–Huygens, Rosetta, Voyager 1 and Voyager 2, New Horizons, and the James Webb Space Telescope.

On 20 April 2024, all six radio-frequency antennas at the Madrid complex were arrayed together for the first time in order to receive data from Voyager 1. JPL described this as the first instance of six DSN antennas being arrayed at once, and stated that Madrid was then the only deep-space communication complex with six operational antennas.

NASA states that, during Artemis II, primary communications support transitions to the Deep Space Network after Orion's translunar injection burn. As one of the network's three global complexes, the Madrid site forms part of the infrastructure used to maintain communications with Orion beyond low Earth orbit and during its journey to and around the Moon.

== See also ==
- Canberra Deep Space Communication Complex
- Deep Space Network
- Fresnedillas de la Oliva
- Goldstone Deep Space Communications Complex
- Instituto Nacional de Técnica Aeroespacial
