= Church of San Bernabé (El Escorial) =

Cultural property in the Community of Madrid, Spain

- Iglesia de San Bernabé (Spanish)
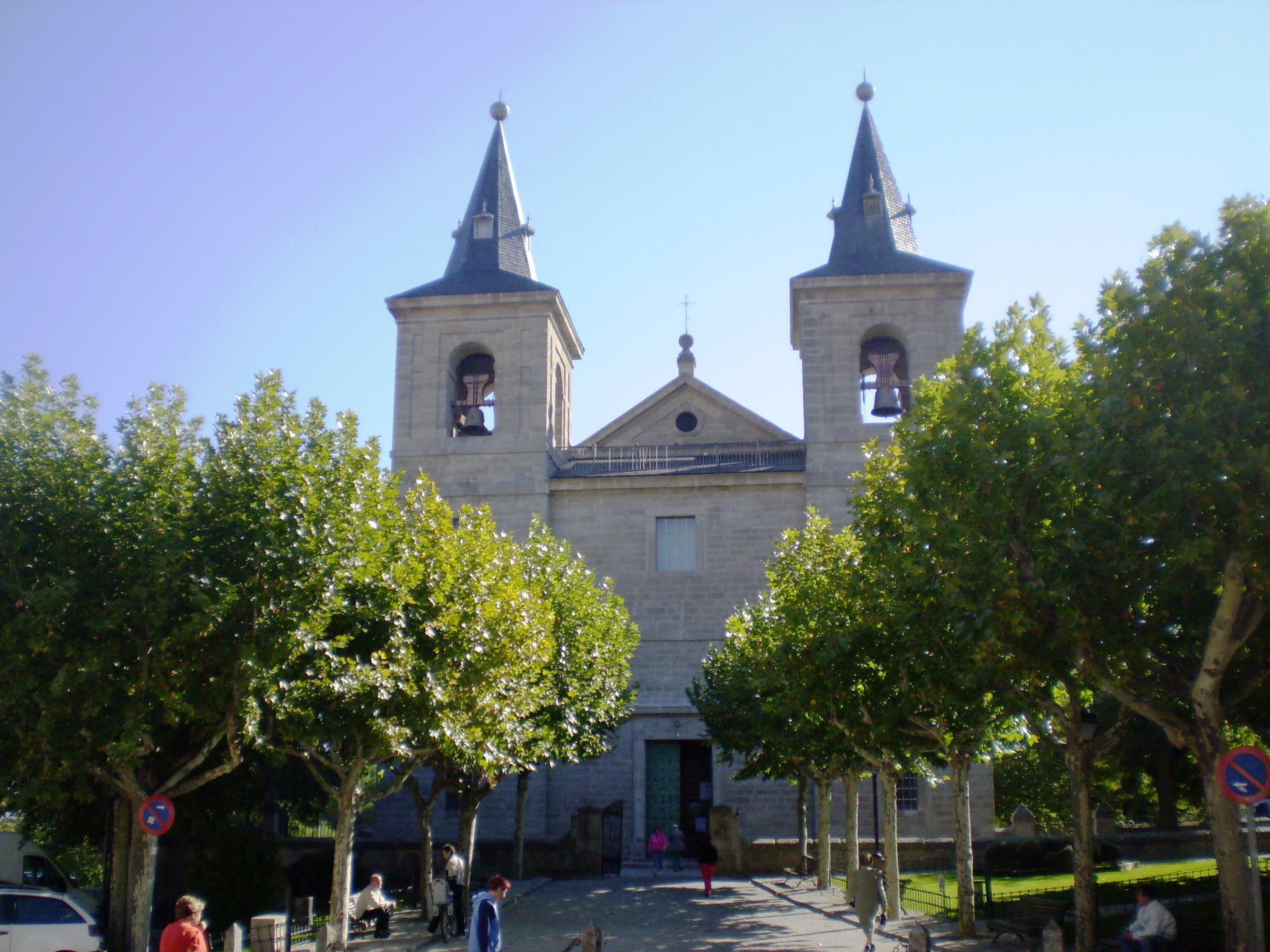

- Location within Spain
- 40.584857°N 4.127003°W
- Location: El Escorial, Spain

Spanish Cultural Heritage
- Official name: Iglesia de San Bernabé
- Type: Non-movable
- Criteria: Monument
- Designated: 1983
- Reference no.: RI-51-0004876

The Church of San Bernabé (Spanish: Iglesia de San Bernabé) is a church located in El Escorial, Spain. It was declared Bien de Interés Cultural in 1983.

== See also ==
- Imperial Route of the Community of Madrid
