= La Granjilla de La Fresneda de El Escorial =

Historic royal park in El Escorial, Spain

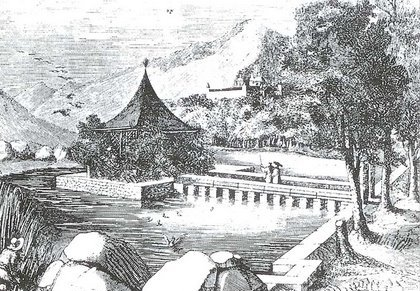
One of the ponds of La Granjilla de La Fresneda, in an 1862 drawing by Antonio Rotondo.

La Fresneda (also known as La Granjilla de La Fresneda de El Escorial or La Granjilla) is a park in El Escorial, Community of Madrid, Spain. Built between 1561 and 1569, it was the private Royal Park of Philip II in the surroundings of the Monastery of El Escorial.

== History ==
To symbolize the union and centralization of political power of the Hispanic Monarchy, in 1561 Philip II chose, almost simultaneously, Madrid as the capital of the Kingdom of Spain and the hillside of Abantos, a mount in Sierra de Guadarrama, to construct a Hieronymite Monastery, el Monasterio de San Lorenzo El Real, also known as Monasterio del Escorial, or El Escorial: the monastery receives its name from the municipality of El Escorial. Furthermore, the king commissioned Juan Bautista de Toledo to build a Royal Park at La Fresneda, then a village, at the foothills of Abantos and Las Machotas, near the small village of El Escorial (equidistant of both, el Monasterio and La Granjilla).

La Granjilla was designed by Juan Bautista de Toledo as homologous, but conceptually opposed, to the Monastery of El Escorial. Other collaborators in the project were Gaspar de Vega, Juan de Herrera, Pedro de Tolosa, fray Marcos de Cardona and Petri Jansen.

== Description ==
Located at the foothills of the Sierra de Guadarrama, La Granjilla de La Fresneda is a multifunctional architectural complex including ornamental, ethnobotanical and spagyric gardens, artificial dams and waterways, and a hunting reserve. The different sections of the Royal Park are separated by dry stone walls.

Fray Marcos de Cardona, a Hieronymite monk, was the designer and gardener of the Royal Gardens. Dutch hydraulic expert, Petre Janson, oversaw the creation of the five Royal Lakes. Both the monk and pond expert were working under the directions of Philip II and Juan Bautista de Toledo.

The highest and largest pond receives water from the Aulencia river. This pond provides water to the other three artificial lakes and to the whole complex through a system of dams, waterways and conduits--a unique and inspired hydraulic archeology from the Spanish Renaissance.

The Royal Gardens in La Granjilla de La Fresneda and the Gardens of El Escorial (La Huerta del Monasterio) are very peculiar and unique Spanish Renaissance royal gardens; both of them were hybrids of ornamental gardens, market gardens, ethnobotanical garden and spagyric garden. Its relevance is obvious in the context of previous historical royal gardens and royal cottages, such as the gardens of the Chateau de Chambord of Francis I.

La Granjilla de La Fresneda won the International Carlo Scarpa Award from the Benetton Foundation, for the management and conservation of Historical Gardens.

La Casa de Campo de Madrid, La Granjilla de La Fresneda del Escorial and El Canal del Escorial (built to supply water to the Monastery) and La Cacera de La Granjilla de La Fresneda (the aqueduct to feed the ponds of La Granjilla, from the Aulencia river) were designed by Juan Bautista de Toledo and Juan de Herrera. These civil engineering works were part of an extensive network of hydraulic, environmental and infrastructural transformations stretching out from Madrid to the slopes of Abantos and mountain-tops of Santa María de la Alameda, the starting point for El Canal del Escorial, the catchment area of the Alberche river.

== See also ==
- El Escorial
- Valle de los Caídos
- Imperial Route of the Community of Madrid

== Sources ==
- La Fresneda. Un lugar de Felipe II en el entorno de El Escorial, Luis Cervera Vera - ISBN 84-89796-67-X. This book is published by Fundación Benetton as part of the Carlo Scarpa Award, represent an updated account of current knowledge about La Granjilla. Nevertheless the research is not finished.
- La Granjilla, Embalses y Canales' by Rosario Aguadero Fernández, Juan Ignacio Contreras Garrido, José Mansilla Ramos and Jesús Sánchez Pulpí - ETS de Caminos, Universidad Politécnica de Madrid.
- El Conjunto Monacal y Cortesano de La Fresneda en El Escorial, Luis Cervera Vera - Real Academia de Bellas Artes de San Fernando.
- Arquitectura y Desarrollo Urbano, Tomo V, El Escorial y San Lorenzo de El Escorial - Comunidad Autónoma de Madrid, Colegio de Arquitectos de Madrid y Fundación Caja Madrid, ISBN 84-451-1513-8.
- Jardín y Naturaleza en el Reinado de Felipe II - Carmen Añón Feliu y José Luis Sancho
- La Octava Maravilla del Mundo, Estudio sobre El Escorial de Felipe II - Agustín Bustamante García, Universidad Autónoma de Madrid, ISBN 84-381-0230-1.
- Canal de El Escorial, Sistema de Abastecimiento de Agua al Monasterio de El Escorial, Francisco J Martín Carrasco, Gabriel I Cuena López, J Pedro Mora Fernández t Rodrigo Vázquez Orellana - ETS de Caminos, Universidad Politécnica de Madrid.
- El Molino Caído de El Escorial, Carlos Nera Alvear, Juan C López Verdejo, Francisco J Sánchez Caro, José M Pérez Pozuelo - ETS de Caminos, Universidad Politécnica de Madrid.
- Caminos de Madrid a El Escorial en la Época de Felipe II y Puntos Singulares, Margarita Torres Rodríguez, Fernando Díez Rubio - ETS de Caminos, Universidad Politécnica de Madrid.
- Arqueología Industrial y Preindustrial en El Escorial, Antonio Pinel Mañas, M Concepción Martín Robles - ETS de Caminos, Universidad Politécnica de Madrid.
