= Colmenarejo =

Coordinates: 40°33′39″N 4°1′1″W

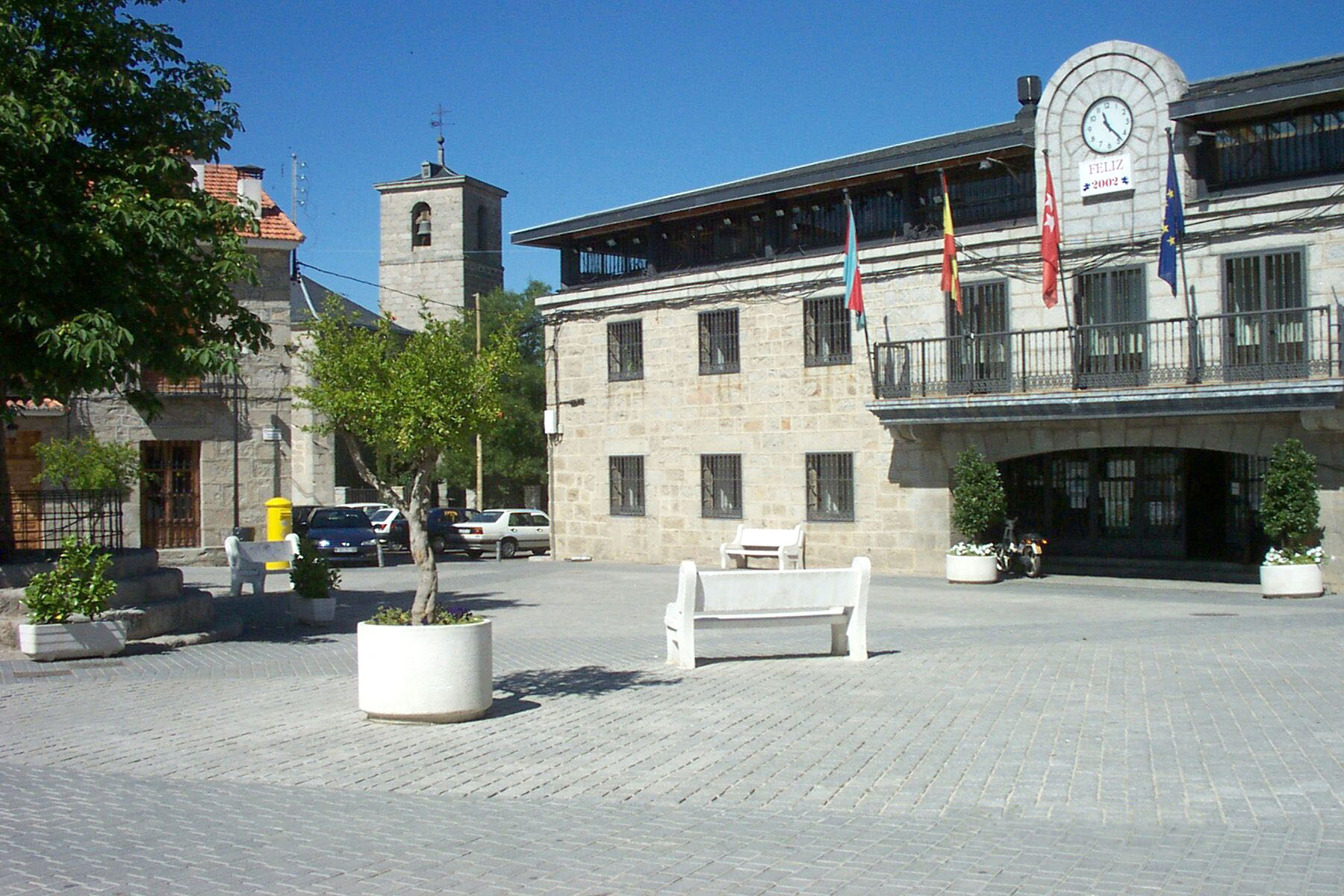
- Colmenarejo's Town Hall

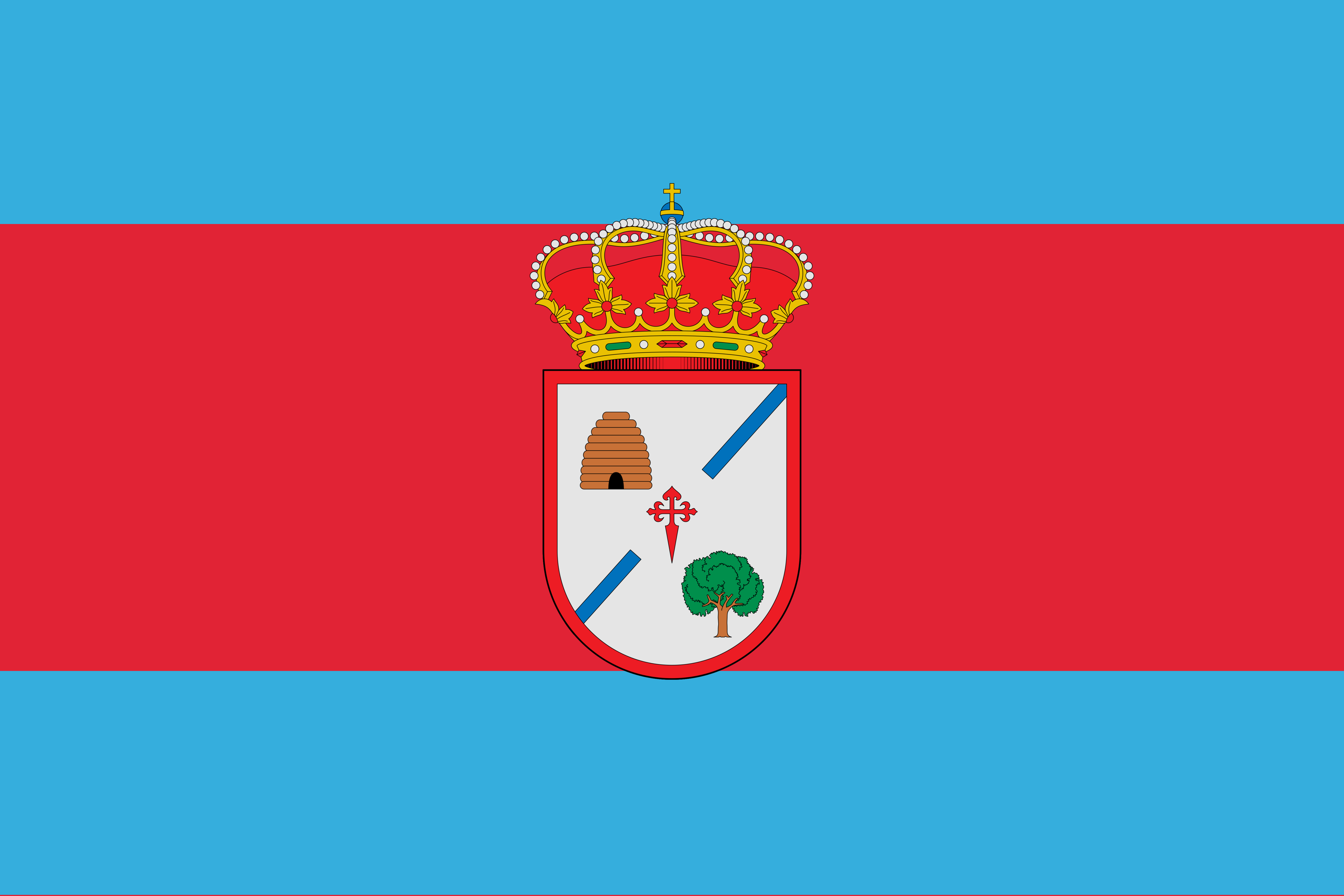
- Flag Coat of arms

- Location of Colmenarejo in Madrid

- Location in Spain.
- Country: Spain
- Autonomous community: Madrid

Government
  - Mayor: Fernando Juanas (PP)

Area
  - Total: 31.7 km^{2} (12.2 sq mi)
- Elevation: 899 m (2,949 ft)

Population (2025-01-01)
  - Total: 9,640
  - Density: 304/km^{2} (788/sq mi)
- Time zone: UTC+1 (CET)
  - Summer (DST): UTC+2 (CEST)
- Website: www.ayto-colmenarejo.org

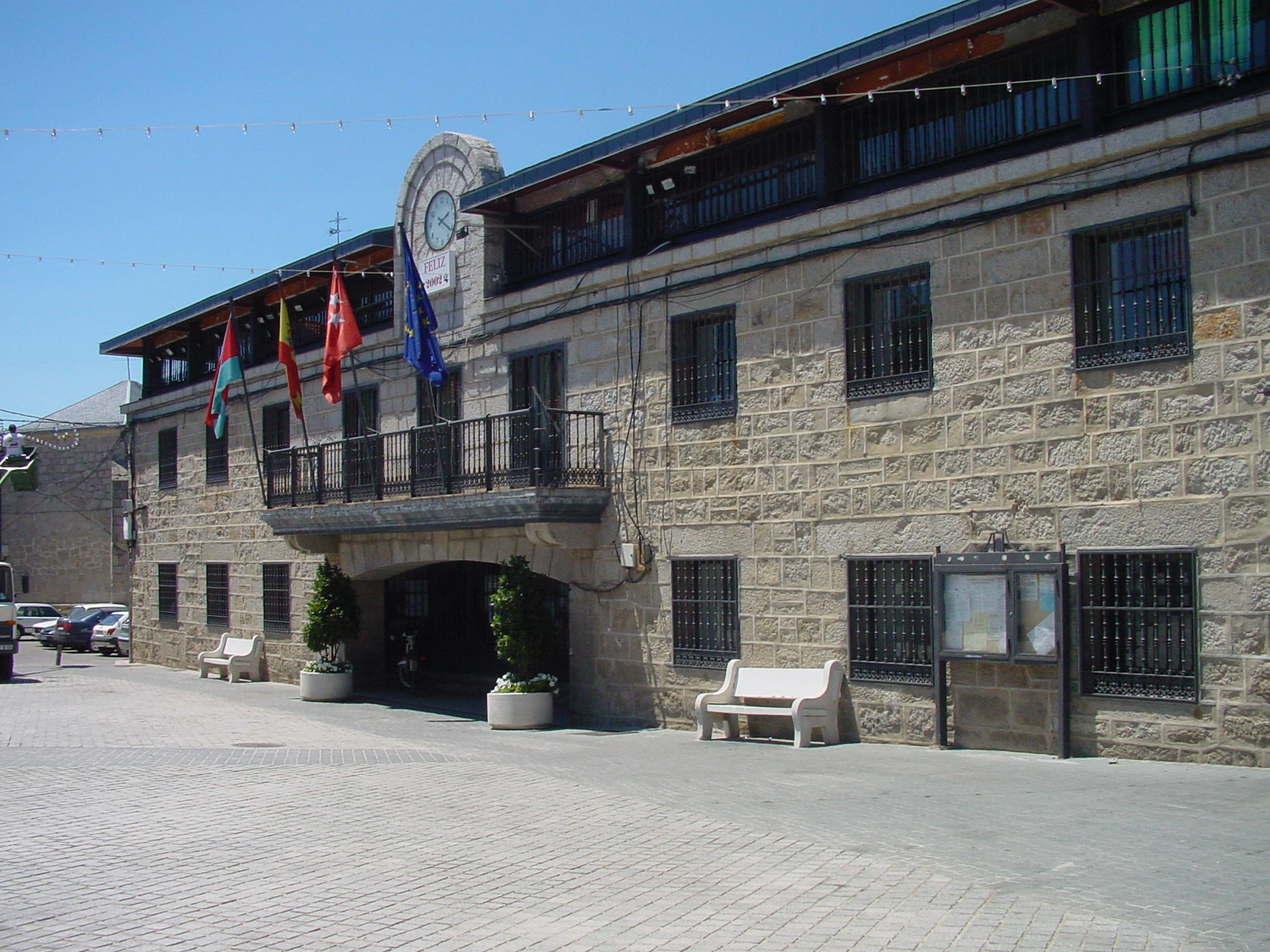
City Hall

Colmenarejo (Spanish: [kolmenaˈɾexo]) is a Spanish town and municipality in the Community of Madrid, located in the northwest of the region, in the foothills of the Sierra de Guadarrama, 899 meters high and 37 kilometers away from the capital. It is bordered to the north by El Escorial, to the east by Galapagar, to the south by Villanueva del Pardillo and to the west by Valdemorillo. Its only road access is the M 510, from Galapagar or from Valdemorillo. It has in its municipality with the east bank of the reservoir of Valmayor, second in capacity of the Region of Madrid, with the third Campus of the University Carlos III of Madrid.

== Municipal politic ==
Colmenarejo's Town Hall is represented by 13 councillors, elected by universal suffrage every four years. The municipal council is chaired by the mayor and operates in plenary sessions and through commissions.

The current distribution of the councillors, after the municipal elections held in May 2023, is as follows:

Political parties in the Town Hall of Colemnarejo 2023
Political parties	Councillors
PP	6
Más Madrid Colmenarejo	2
Vox	2
PSOE	1
Partido Local de Colmenarejo (PALCO)	1
Unión y Compromiso Colmenarejo (UYCC)	1

=== Mayors of Colmenarejo since Spanish transition ===
The current mayor is Fernando Juanas Cerrada of the PP who governs in coalition with Partido Local de Colmenarejo (PALCO) and Unión y Compromiso Colmenarejo (UYCC), surpassing the absolute majority.

Mayor	Office started	Office ended	Party affiliation
Benito Elvira García	1979	1995	PSOE
Julio García Elvira	1995	1999	PP
María Isabel Peces-Barba Martínez	1999	2011	APIC (Independent)
Nieves Roses Roses	2011	2019	PP
Miriam Polo Fernández	2019	January 2023	PSOE
Nieves Roses Roses	January 2023	June 2023	PP
Fernando Juanas Cerrada	2023	-	PP
