= Navalagamella =

Coordinates: 40°28′N 4°07′W

- Municipality
- Flag Coat of arms

- Municipal location within the Community of Madrid.
- Country: Spain
- Autonomous community: Community of Madrid

Area
  - Total: 29.36 sq mi (76.05 km^{2})
- Elevation: 2,470 ft (753 m)

Population (2025-01-01)
  - Total: 3,169
  - Density: 107.9/sq mi (41.67/km^{2})
- Time zone: UTC+1 (CET)
  - Summer (DST): UTC+2 (CEST)

Navalagamella is a municipality of the Community of Madrid, Spain.

== See also ==
- Imperial Route of the Community of Madrid
