= Fresnedillas de la Oliva =

- Municipality
- Flag Coat of arms

- Municipal location within the Community of Madrid.
- Coordinates: 40°29′N 4°10′W
- Country: Spain
- Autonomous community: Community of Madrid

Area
  - Total: 28.20 km^{2} (10.89 sq mi)
- Elevation: 899 m (2,949 ft)

Population (2025-01-01)
  - Total: 1,883
- Time zone: UTC+1 (CET)
  - Summer (DST): UTC+2 (CEST)

Fresnedillas de la Oliva is a municipality of the autonomous community of Madrid in central Spain. It has a population of 1,581 inhabitants (INE, 2011).

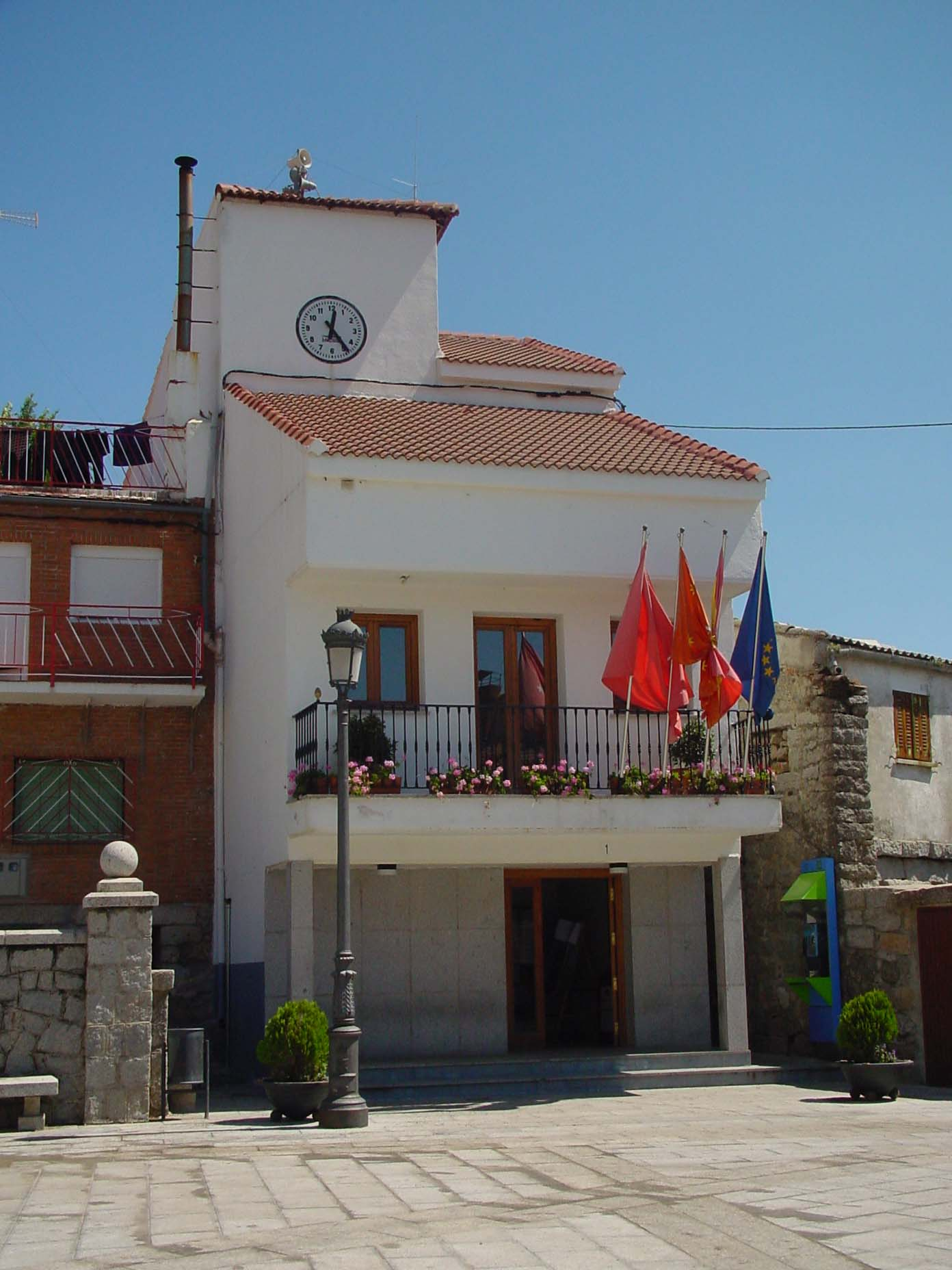
City Hall

== See also ==
- Imperial Route of the Community of Madrid
