= Juan Bautista de Toledo =

Spanish architect (c. 1515–1567)

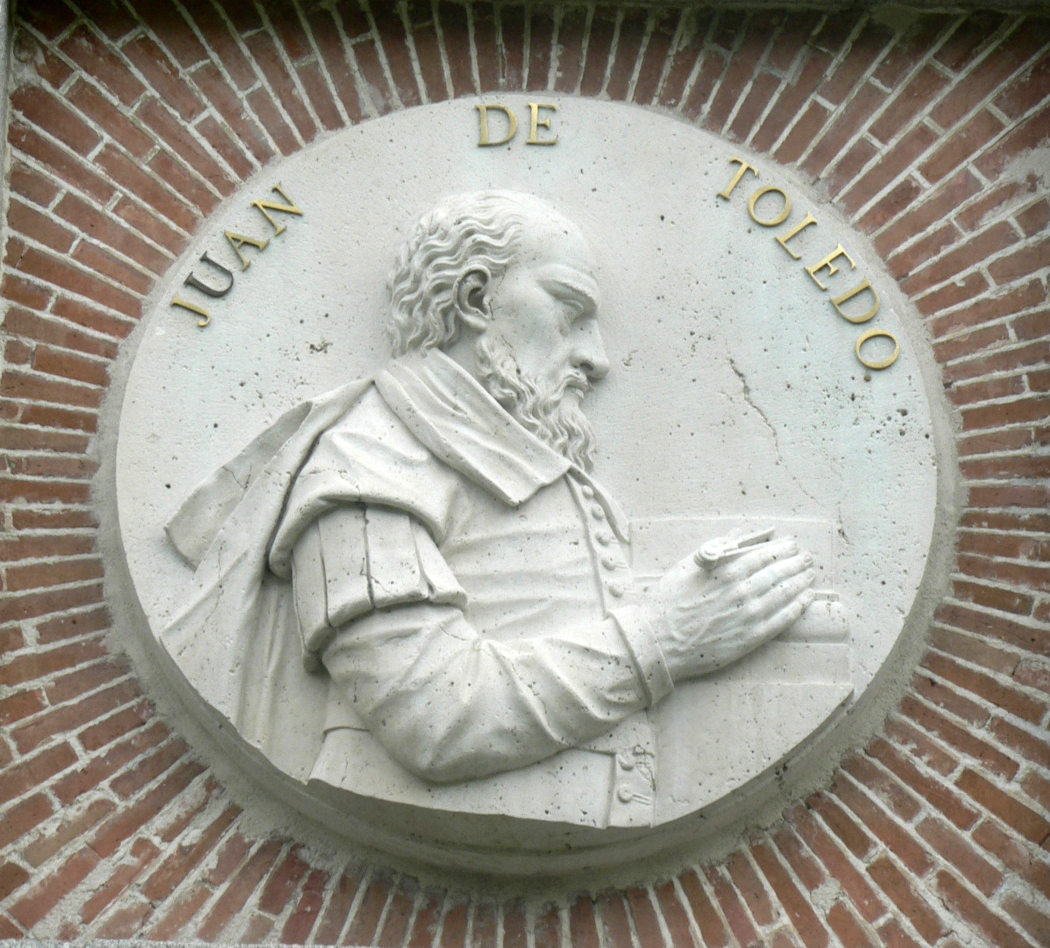
Juan Bautista de Toledo, Museo del Prado

Juan Bautista de Toledo (c. 1515 – 19 May 1567) was a Spanish architect. He was educated in Italy, in the Italian High Renaissance. As many Italian renaissance architects, he had experience in both architecture and military and civil public works. He was born, either in Toledo or in Madrid, around 1515. He died on 19 May 1567 in Madrid, and was buried in Madrid in the choir of the primitive “Convento de Santo Tomás, Iglesia de la Santa Cruz”.

== Career ==
De Toledo perhaps started his career in architecture in Rome, between 1534 and 1541, working for Michelangelo and Pope Paul III (Alessandro Farnese), completing the courtyard of Palazzo Farnese. Then, possibly, he continued his training in the construction site of St. Peter's Basilica, under the direction of Antonio da Sangallo the Younger. Another hypothesis is that he worked for Antonio da Sangallo the Younger in both Fortaleza da Basso, Florence and St. Peter’s Basilica of Rome.

The identity of Juan Bautista de Toledo is not entirely clear. In Florence and Rome as Giovanni Battista de Alfonsis, while in Naples and Madrid he was identified as Juan Bautista de Toledo: Notably, the handwriting attributed to the two Spanish architects appears to be identical. This raises the possibility that his full name may have been Juan Bautista de Toledo Alfonsis.

== El Escorial ==
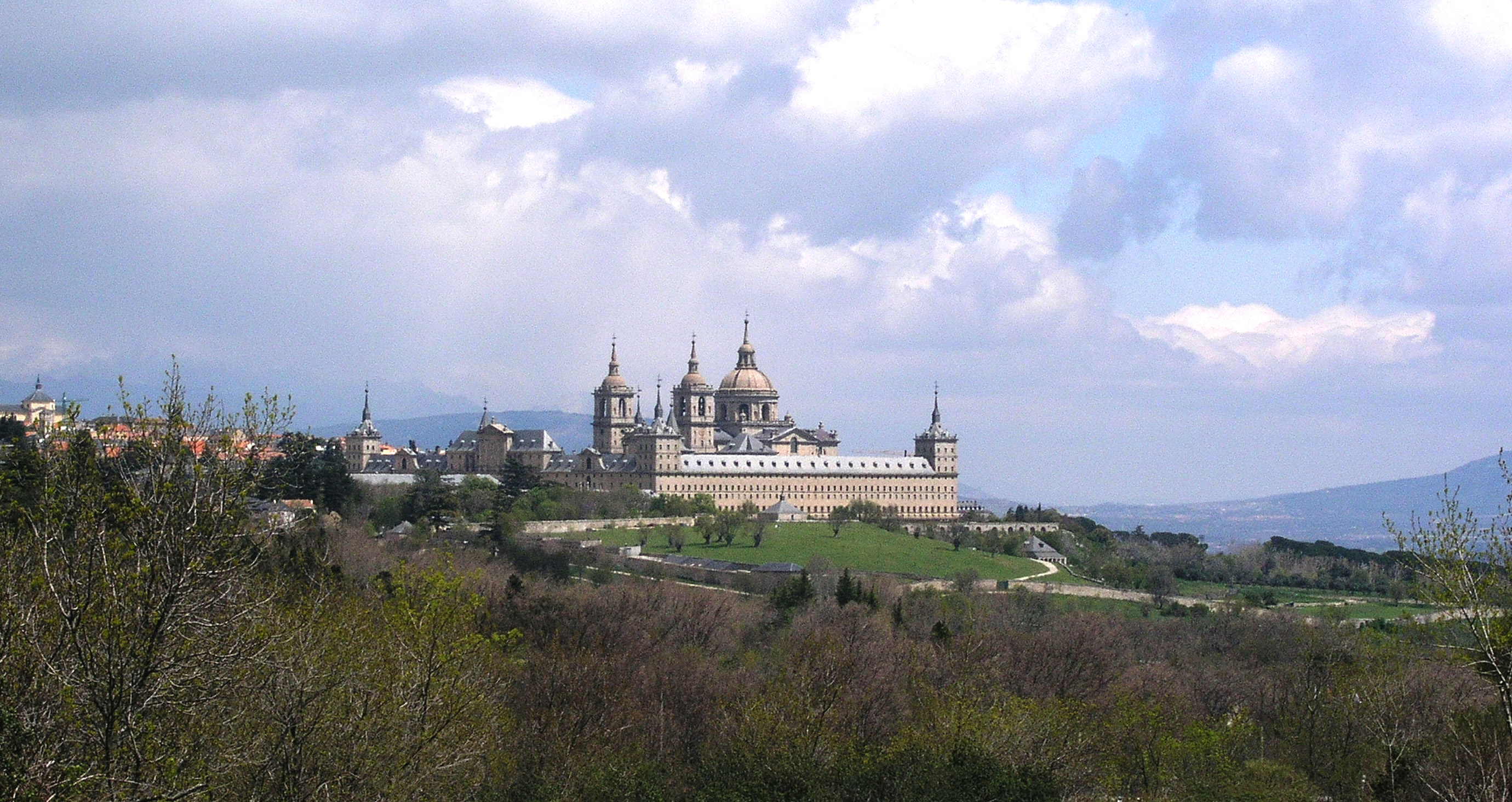
Toledo made the plans for the Monastery of El Escorial

In El Escorial, his most significant work, on 23 April 1563, in the ceremony of the masonry stone (cornerstone), Juan de Herrera wrote over the visible side of the first stone, "JOANNES BAPTISTA ARCHITECTUS MAJOR. APRILES 23". In the other sides of the first stone, the inscriptions are: in one side, "DEUS OPTIMUS MAXIMUS OPERO ASPICIAT"; and in the other side, "PHILIPUS HISPANIARUM REX A FUNDAMENTIS ERIXIR −1563": "En 23 dias del mes de abril, dia de San Jorge mártir, deste año de 1563 se puso la primera piedra del monasterio en el cimiento del reflectorio, debajo de la silla del prior, que es en la bodega, debajo del dicho reflectorio, la cual piedra es cuadrada y está escrita por todas partes, que da a entender quien es el fundador, y quien es el arquitecto y el día y año en que se pone".

On 18 December 1546 Pope Paul III appointed the Spaniard Joannes Baptista, Deputy Coordinator Architect for St. Peter's Basilica of Rome: "Similis deputatio pro Joanne Bapta. Hispano". On 26 February 1547 “Michelangelo (…) informed the Florentine mason master Niccolo that he was to follow the orders of Giovanni Battista de Alfonsis, his personal choice as successor of Labacco(…)”.

Before his patron Paul III, died in 1549, on 20 September 1548 de Toledo was summoned by the Viceroy Pedro Álvarez de Toledo Giovanni Battista de Alfonsis went to Naples to work under the name of "Juan Bautista de Toledo" in the position of "Maestro Mayor de Obras Reales en el Reino de Nápoles".

In Naples, he designed and rebuilt many buildings, including: the Strada di Toledo (since 1870 called Strada di Roma), the church of St. Giacomo degli Spagnuoli; the square bastions to the Castel Nuovo; a large palazzo at Posillipo, Castel Sant'Elmo; and several fountains.

In 1559, he was appointed Maestro Mayor de Obras Reales (mainly in Madrid and Toledo) by Philip II and summoned back to Madrid. His yearly salary was at first no more than 220 ducats, because Philip's policy, with his Spanish artists at least, was to give them moderate allowances until he had tested their abilities.

He restored the Alcazar de Madrid, Alcazar de Toledo and Convento de los Jerónimos de Madrid. He designed the frontage of the church de las Descalzas Reales He also performed architectural and public works in Casa de Campo de Madrid, Casa Real de Aceca and the Royal Palace of Aranjuez.

In 1561, he was appointed "Arquitecto Real" responsible for the town planning of El Escorial: Monastery, El Escorial village and La Granjilla de La Fresneda. He supervised architectural and public works in San Lorenzo de El Escorial (village), the surroundings of El Escorial (monastery) and La Granjilla until his death in 1567. The monastery was finished by Juan de Herrera in 1584.

The main public works in the town planning of El Escorial were the Aqueduct and Ponds of La Granjilla, the Aqueduct to the Monastery and the two streets joining El Escorial (village) to the Monastery and La Granjilla. El Escorial of Juan Bautista de Toledo and Juan de Herrera is an example of territorial development based on exclusive aesthetic values of global significance.

Furthermore, he designed the overall outline of La Granjilla de La Fresneda. The project was finished with the collaboration of architects, Gaspar de Vega and Juan de Herrera; gardener fray Marcos de Cardona; Furthermore, Dutch dam experts Petre Janson and Spond.

== See also ==
- Philip II of Spain
- El Escorial, Madrid
- La Granjilla de La Fresneda de El Escorial, Madrid
- Juan de Herrera
- San Lorenzo de El Escorial, Madrid
- Valle de los Caídos

== Bibliography ==
- Los verdaderos artífices de El Escorial y el estilo indebidamente llamado Herreriano | Portabales Pichel, Amancio | Madrid 1945.
- Maestros mayores, arquitectos y aparejadores de El Escorial | Portabales Pichel, Amancio | Madrid 1945.
- Juan Bautista de Toledo, arquitecto segundo de la fábrica de San Pedro de Roma | Carlos Vicuña OSA, Monasterio del Escorial | 1966.
- Juan Bautista de Toledo y Miguel Ángel en el Vaticano | Severino Giner Guerri | Goya, nº 126.
- Juan Bautista de Toledo y Felipe II: la implantación del clasicismo en España | Rivera Blanco, José Javier | Universidad de Valladolid 1984.
- Juan de Herrera, arquitecto de Felipe II | Ruiz de Arcaute, Agustín | Madrid 1997.
- Juan de Herrera: arquitecto de Felipe II | Wilkinson-Zerner, Catherine | 1996.
- Copyright in the Renaissance: Prints and the Privilegio in Sixteenth-Century Venice and Rome | Christopher L.C.E. Witcombe | 2004.
- Michelangelo at St. Peter's: The Arberino Correspondence | Howard Saalman.
- Architectural Drawings of Antonio Da Sangallo the Younger and His Circle: Fortifications, Machines and Festival Architecture | Vol 1 | Christoph L. Frommel, Nicholas Adams (Eds.) | February 1994 |The MIT Press.
- Architectural Drawings of Antonio Da Sangallo the Younger and His Circle: Churches, Villas, the Pantheon, Tombs, and Ancient Inscriptions | Vol 2 | Christoph L. Frommel, Adams Nicholas (Eds.) | September 2000 |The MIT Press.
- Unpublished paper of Agustin Bustamante Garcia (UAM: Universidad Autónoma de Madrid) on Juan Bautista de Toledo (Giovanni Battista de Alfonsis) at Florence.
- Las tres primeras piedras del Monasterio de San Lorenzo el Real de El Escorial | Pedro Martín Gómez | Homenaje a Juan de Herrera | Fundación Obra Pía "Juan de Herrera | Santander | 1988.
- Meorias | Fray Juan de San Gerónimo | Colección de Documentos Inéditos para la Historia de España, tomo VII | Madrid | 1845.
- Historia de la Orden de San Jerónimo | Fray José de Sigüenza | Madrid | 1605.
- Los orígenes arquitectónicos del Real Monasterio de El Escorial | Secundino Zuazo Ugalde, | Discurso de ingreso en la Real Academia de Bellas Artes de San Fernando | Madrid, 1948.
- La obra de El Escorial | George Kubler | Madrid, 1982.
