= Robledo de Chavela =

Coordinates: 40°30′N 4°14′W

- Flag Coat of arms

- Location in Spain.
- Country: Spain
- Autonomous community: Madrid

Area
  - Total: 93.01 km^{2} (35.91 sq mi)
- Elevation: 901 m (2,956 ft)

Population (2025-01-01)
  - Total: 4,818
  - Density: 51.80/km^{2} (134.2/sq mi)
- Time zone: UTC+1 (CET)
  - Summer (DST): UTC+2 (CEST)
- Website: www.robledodechavela.es

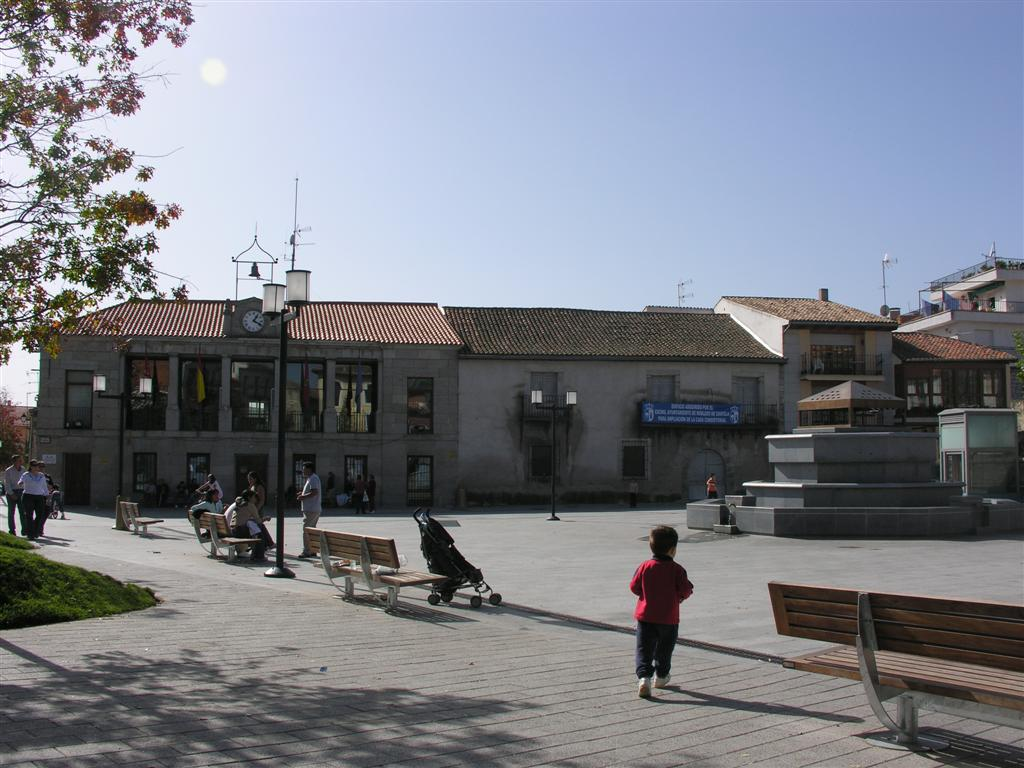
Robledo de Chavela.

Robledo de Chavela is a municipality in the Community of Madrid, Spain with a population of 4,587 in 2022.

The Madrid Deep Space Communication Complex (MDSCC) is located in this town.

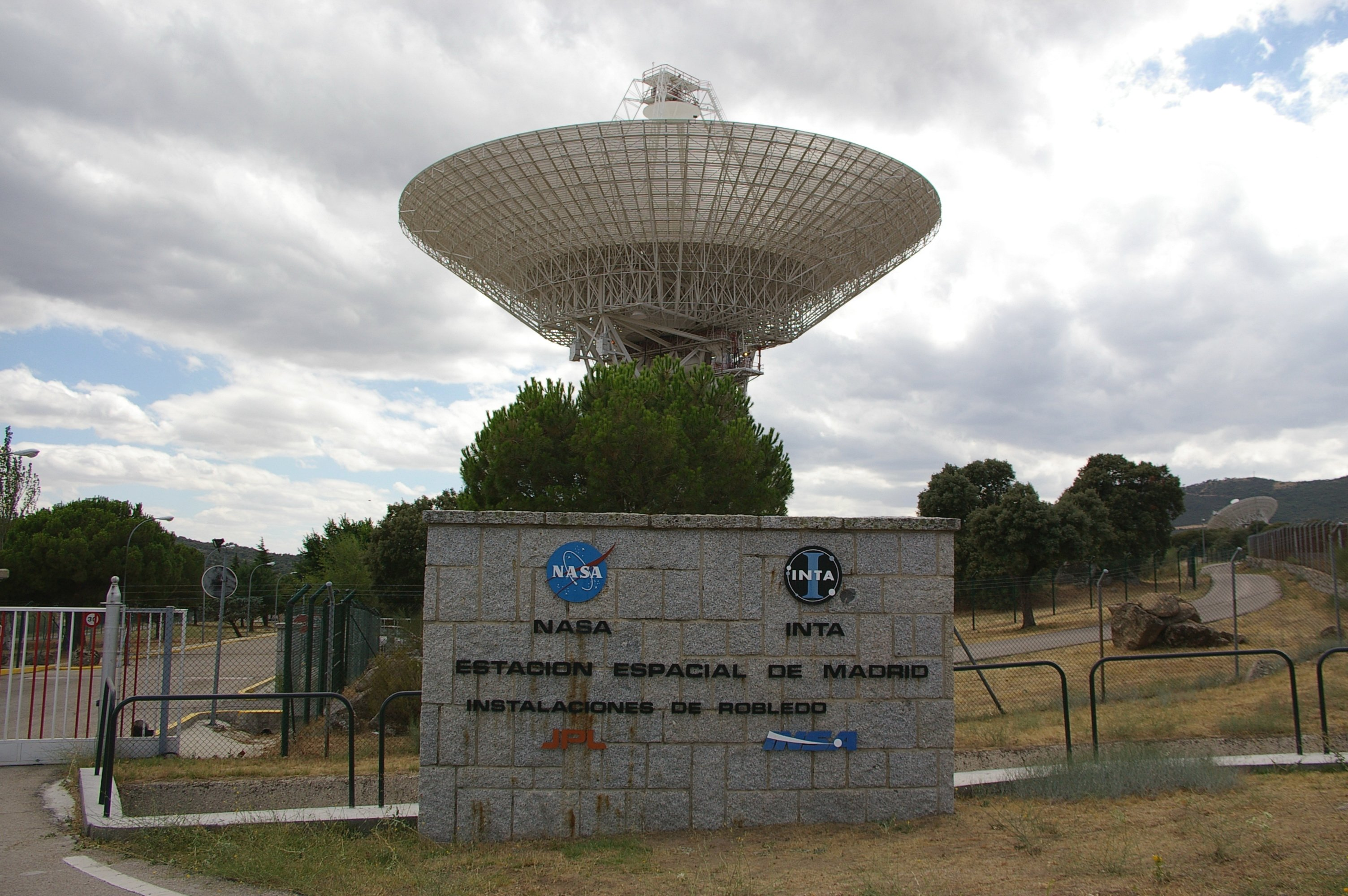
View of the Madrid Deep Space Communication Complex, and the 70m antenna.

== See also ==
- Imperial Route of the Community of Madrid
