= Cáceres (surname) =

Cáceres or Caceres is a Spanish surname. People with the surname include:

- Caceres family, a Jewish family
- Adrian Caceres (born 1982), Argentine-born Australian football player
- Alex Caceres (born 1988), American mixed martial artist
- Alexia Cáceres (born 1995), Paraguayan handball player
- Alonso de Escobar y Cáceres (16th Century), Spanish military
- Andrés Avelino Cáceres (1833–1923), President of Peru
- Anthony Caceres (born 1992), Australian football player
- Antony Caceres (born 2000), Canadian soccer player
- Atilio Cáceres (born 1981), Paraguayan football player
- Berta Cáceres (1970s–2016), Honduran environmental activist
- Bertha Zúñiga Cáceres (born 1990), Hondurigen social activist
- Blas Cáceres (born 1990), Paraguayan football player
- Blazco Múñoz de Cáceres Spanish nobleman
- Carlos Arturo Cáceres (born 1977), Chilean football player
- Carlos Gamarra Cáceres (1948–2005), Paraguayan chess master
- Carlos Navarrete Cáceres (born 1931), Guatemalan anthropologist and writer
- Catalina Cáceres (born 1990), Chilean model and beauty pageant titleholder
- César Cáceres Cañete (born 1977), Paraguayan football player
- Daniel Cáceres Silva (born 1982), Paraguayan football player
- Darío Cáceres (born 1998), Paraguayan football player
- Delfín Benítez Cáceres (1910–2004), Paraguayan football player
- Diego de Cáceres y Ovando, Spanish nobleman
- Domingo Pérez Cáceres (1892–1961), Spanish ecclesiastic, Bishop of San Cristóbal de La Laguna
- Édgar Barreto (born 1984), Paraguayan football player
- Edgar Cáceres (born 1964), Venezuelan baseball player
- Eduardo Cáceres, Vice President of Guatemala, 1970–74
- Emilio Bobadilla Cáceres (1907–1979), Paraguayan songwriter
- Enrique Cáceres (born 1974), Paraguayan football referee
- Ernie Caceres (1911–1971), American jazz saxophonist
- Esther de Cáceres (1903–1971), Uruguayan poet and writer
- Eusebio Cáceres (born 1991), Spanish athlete
- Fernán Blázquez de Cáceres (14th century), Spanish nobleman, son of Juan Blázquez
- Fernando Cáceres (born 1969), Argentine football player
- Francisco Caceres, TV host and producer
- Ignacio Cáceres (born 1976), Spanish long-distance runner
- Javier Caceres (footballer) (born 1939), Peruvian football player
- Javier Caceres (sport shooter) (1925–2021), Peruvian sport shooter
- Jorge Cáceres (pentathlete) (1917–1975), Argentine pentathlete
- Jorge Cáceres (poet) (1923–1949), Chilean poet, painter and dancer
- Jorge Luis Cáceres (born 1982), Ecuadorian writer, editor, and anthologist
- Jorge Ramón Cáceres (born 1948), Argentine football player
- Jorge Suárez Cáceres (born 1976), Puerto Rican politician
- José Miguel Cáceres (born 1981), Dominican volleyball player
- José Núñez de Cáceres (1772–1846), Dominican politician and writer
- Juan Blázquez de Cáceres, Spanish soldier and nobleman
- Juan Cáceres (footballer, born 1949) (born 1949), Peruvian football player
- Juan Cáceres (racing driver) (born 1984), Uruguayan racing driver
- Juan Carlos Cáceres (1936–2015), Argentine musician
- Juan Daniel Cáceres (born 1973), Paraguayan football player
- Juan de Cáceres y Ulloa (1618–1682), Spanish nobleman and musician
- Juan Francisco Cáceres (born 1962), Mexican politician
- Juan Ignacio Cáceres (born 1992), Argentine sprint canoeist
- Julio César Cáceres (born 1979), Paraguayan football player
- Kurt Caceres (born 1972), American actor
- Leticia Cáceres (born 1978), Australian stage and film director
- Luciano Cáceres, Argentine actor
- Luis Cáceres (footballer) (born 1988), Paraguayan football player
- Maite Cáceres (born 2002), Uruguayan racing driver
- Manuel Altagracia Cáceres (1838–1878), Dominican politician
- Marcos Cáceres (born 1986), Paraguayan football player
- Mario Cáceres (born 1981), Chilean football player
- Martín Cáceres (born 1987), Uruguayan football player
- Miguel Ángel Cáceres (born 1978), Paraguayan football player
- Miguel Ángel Peña Cáceres (born 1970), Spanish racing cyclist
- Oscar Caceres (born 1932), Peruvian sports shooter
- Pablo Caballero Cáceres (born 1972), Paraguayan football player and manager
- Pablo Cáceres Rodríguez (born 1985), Uruguayan football player
- Pablo Montesino Cáceres (1781–1849), Spanish teacher and academic
- Pedro Cáceres (born 1960), Argentine middle-distance runner
- Rafael Pinochet Cáceres (1898–1989), Chilean politician
- Ramón Cáceres (1866–1911), 31st president of the Dominican Republic
- Raphaël Cacérès (born 1987), French football player
- Raúl Cáceres (born 1991), Paraguayan football player
- Raulo Cáceres (born 1976), Spanish comic artist
- Richard Caceres (born 1982), Paraguayan football player
- Roberto Reinaldo Cáceres González (1921–2019), Uruguayan Prelate of Roman Catholic Church
- Rosa Mirambell i Càceres (born 1933), Catalan painter and engraver
- Rubén Nuñez de Cáceres, founder/director of the Center for Human Values of the Tec de Monterrey, Campus Tampico
- Samuel Cáceres (born 1989), Paraguayan football player
- Vesna Cáceres (born 1971), Czech composer, singer and accordionist
- Vicente Cáceres (born 1967), Spanish wrestler
- Víctor Cáceres (born 1985), Paraguayan football player
- Virginio Cáceres (born 1962), a Paraguayan football player

== See also ==
- Cáceres (disambiguation)
- Bartomeu Càrceres (fl.1546), Catalan composer of ensaladas
