= Blázquez =

Blázquez is a Spanish surname. Notable people with this surname include:

== Sports ==
- Adrián Embarba Blázquez (born 1992), Spanish footballer
- Fátima Blázquez (born 1975), Spanish cyclist
- Joaquín Blázquez (born 2001), Argentine footballer
- Joel Robles Blázquez (born 1990), Spanish footballer
- Manuel Blázquez (born 1989), Spanish basketball player
- Ramón Blázquez (born 1989), Spanish footballer
- Sebastián Blázquez (born 1979), Argentine football goalkeeper
- María Fernanda Blázquez Gil (born 1973), known as Fey, Mexican singer
- Sergio Blázquez Sánchez (born 1990), better known as Tekio, Spanish footballer

== Other ==
- Antonio Blázquez y Delgado-Aguilera (1859–1950), Spanish geographer, historian and bibliographer
- Eladia Blázquez (1931–2005), Argentine singer and composer
- Fernán Blázquez de Cáceres (fl. 1364), Spanish nobleman
- Jesús Blázquez (born 1962), Spanish historian, biographer and librarian
- José González Blázquez (1630–1698), Roman Catholic prelate
- Juan Blázquez de Cáceres (fl. 1229), Spanish soldier and nobleman
- Ricardo Blázquez (born 1942), Spanish cardinal
- Sandra Blázquez (born 1987), Spanish actress
