= Daniel Silva =

Daniel, Dan, Danny or Dany Silva may refer to:

== Sports ==
- Danny Silva (baseball) (1896–1974), American baseball player
- Daniel Silva (golfer) (born 1966), Portuguese golfer
- Daniel Conceicao Silva (born 1970), known as just Daniel, Brazilian football midfielder
- Danny Silva (born 1973), Portuguese-American cross-country skier
- Daniel Silva (athlete) (born 1979), Brazilian blind Paralympic track athlete
- Daniel Eduardo Silva (born 1985), Portuguese cyclist
- Dani Silva (born 2000), Portuguese football midfielder

== Others ==
- Daniel Bravo Silva (born 1982), Chilean politician
- Daniel P. Silva (born 1943), American politician
- Daniel Silva (novelist) (born 1960), American novelist
- Dany Silva (fl. 1970s–present), Cape Verdean musician
- Dan Silva, Belizean politician
- Daniel Silva (tattooist) (born 1993), American celebrity tattoo artist and reality TV show participant

== See also ==
- Daniel da Silva (disambiguation)
- Danilo da Silva (disambiguation)
- Daniel Silva dos Santos (1982–2019), Brazilian footballer
- Daniel Cáceres Silva (born 1982), Paraguayan footballer
- Daniel De Silva (born 1997), Australian football player
