= Clavero =

Clavero is a surname. Notable people with the surname include:

- Bartolomé Clavero, Spanish jurist and legal historian
- Daniel Clavero (born 1968), Spanish racing cyclist
- Manuel Clavero (1926–2021), Spanish lawyer and politician
- Rafael Clavero (born 1977), Spanish footballer
