= Francisco Tomás y Valiente =

Spanish jurist

President of the Constitutional Court
- In office 4 March 1986 – 14 July 1992
- Preceded by: Manuel García Pelayo
- Succeeded by: Miguel Rodríguez-Piñero

Personal details
- Born: 8 December 1932 Valencia, Spain
- Died: 14 February 1996 (aged 63) Madrid, Spain
- Cause of death: Assassination
- Resting place: Mingorrubio, Madrid
- Education: University of Valencia

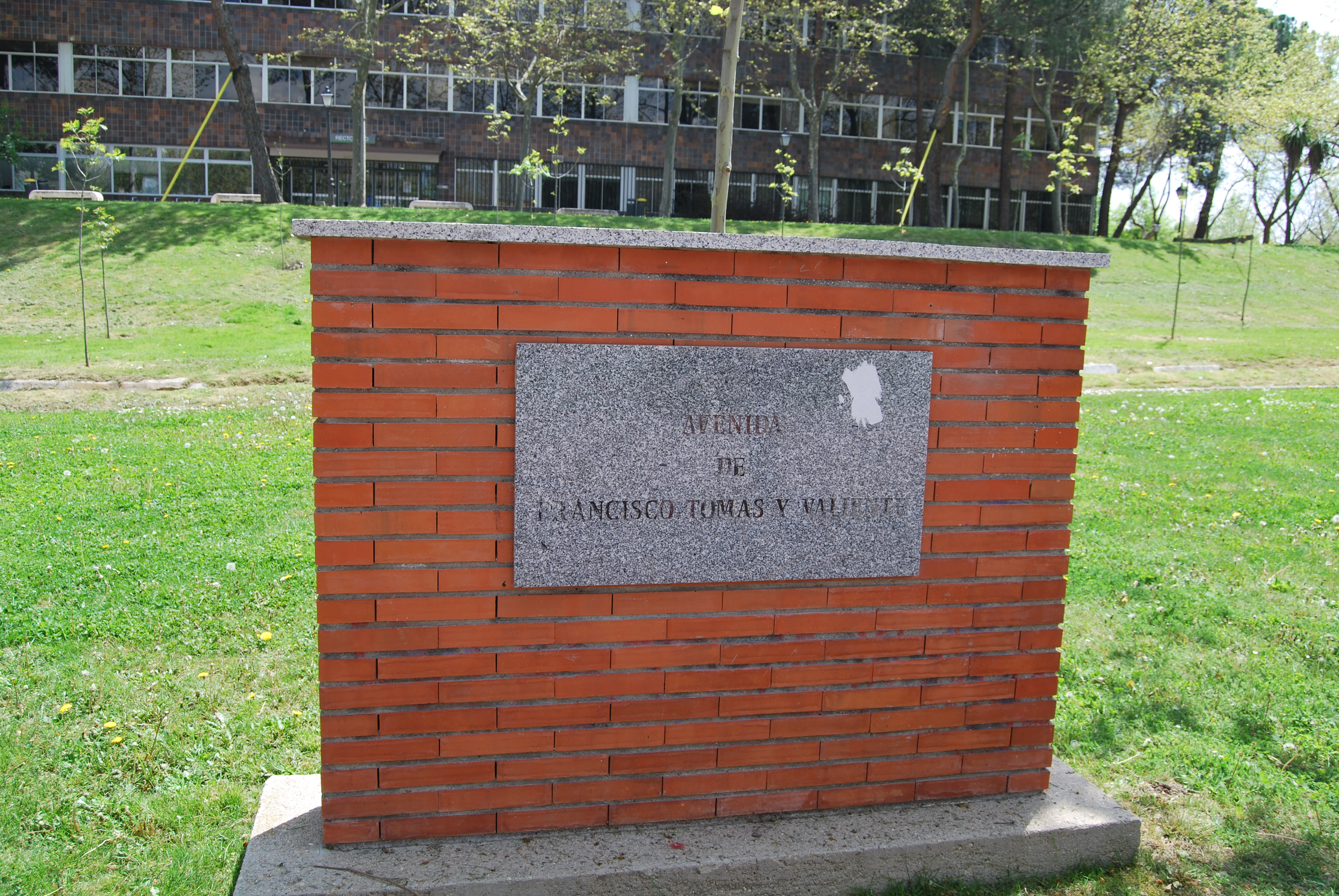
Monument on Avenida de Francisco Tomas Y Valiente, at Autonomous University of Madrid

Francisco Tomás y Valiente (8 December 1932 – 14 February 1996) was a Spanish jurist, historian, and writer. He was professor of history of law in the Autonomous University of Madrid. He presided Spain's Constitutional Court from 1986 to 1992. He was assassinated by ETA in 1996.

His killing led to between 850,000 and 1 million people marching in protest through Madrid, headed by the then Prime Minister, Felipe González (PSOE), and the leaders of all mainstream political parties.

Regarding the definition of "state", Tomás y Valiente declared that without a state there could be neither Law nor rights, only chaos ("Sin Estado no hay ni Derecho ni derechos, solo hay caos"). Likewise, as an expert in the history of Law, he was convinced that the Law does not suffice without goodwill, and he was especially concerned about two particular risks, of four, that he perceived in Spain's political system: the lack of goodwill in co-operating and the autonomous communities' haste in reaching their maximum degree of autonomy.

In February 2026, the 30th anniversary of his death was marked by an exhibition at the Law Faculty of the Autonomous University of Madrid, attended by the King and Queen of Spain.

== Publications ==
- El derecho penal de la monarquía absoluta: (siglos XVI - XVII - XVII) (Ed. Tecnos, 1969)
- El marco político de la desamortización en España (Ariel, 1971)
- La Tortura Judicial en España (Ariel, 1973) ISBN 978-84-344-0731-2
- La Tortura en España (Ariel, 1974)
- Manual de historia del derecho español (Técnos, 1983) ISBN 978-84-309-1006-9
- Gobierno e instituciones en la España del Antiguo Regimen (Alianza Editorial, 1999) ISBN 978-84-206-7933-4

== See also ==
- Bartolome Clavero
