= Cáceres =

Cáceres may refer to:

- Cáceres (surname)
- Province of Cáceres, in Spain
  - Cáceres (Spanish Congress Electoral District), which covers the province
- Cáceres, Spain, the capital of Cáceres Province, not a bishopric
- Cáceres, Antioquia, municipality in Colombia
- Cáceres, Mato Grosso, in the Brazilian state of Mato Grosso
  - Roman Catholic Diocese of São Luíz de Caceres, with the above see
- Ciudad de Nueva Cáceres, former Spanish city in the Philippines
  - Roman Catholic Archdiocese of Caceres, with above see

== See also ==
- Bartomeu Càrceres (fl.1546), Catalan composer of ensaladas
- Nueva Cáceres (disambiguation)
