= Diego Pérez Moreno =

Spanish politician (1580s-1600s)

Personal details
- Born: 1580s Cordoba, Argentina
- Died: 1600s Buenos Aires, Argentina
- Occupation: Government
- Profession: Military

Diego Pérez Moreno (15-16?) was a Spanish Military, Alcalde of Buenos Aires during the Viceroyalty of Peru.

== Biography ==
Diego Pérez Moreno was born in Córdoba, son of Juan Pérez Moreno (conquistador). He was married to Antonia de Escobar, descendant of General Alonso de Escobar. His son, Diego Pérez Moreno y Escobar was regidor in the city. A daughter, Mariana was wife of Captain Andrés Lozano descendant of conquistadores Domingo Gribeo Martín and Andrés Lozano de la Era (1562-1624) (born in Salamanca).
