= Blazco Múñoz de Cáceres =

Spanish nobleman

Blazco Múñoz de Cáceres was a Spanish nobleman.

== Life ==
Blazco Múñoz de Cáceres was a son of Blazco Múñoz de Cáceres, who died at 90 years and lived in Cáceres in 1270, married to Pascuala Pérez, daughter of Pascual Pérez and wife Menga Marín, and great-grandson of Juan Blázquez de Cáceres and wife Teresa Alfón. He was the elder brother of García Blázquez de Cáceres, who by one Marina Pérez was the father of Juan Blázquez de Cáceres, el Gordo, already deceased in 1364, married to Doña María Gil de Mogollón, the parents of Fernán Blázquez de Cáceres, 2nd Lord of the Majorat de Blazco Múñoz.

He was the Founder and 1st Lord of the Majorat of Blazco Múñoz.

== Sources ==
- Cunha, Fernando de Castro Pereira Mouzinho de Albuquerque e (1906-1998), Instrumentário Genealógico - Linhagens Milenárias. MCMXCV, p. 312-3
