= Cebreros =

- municipality
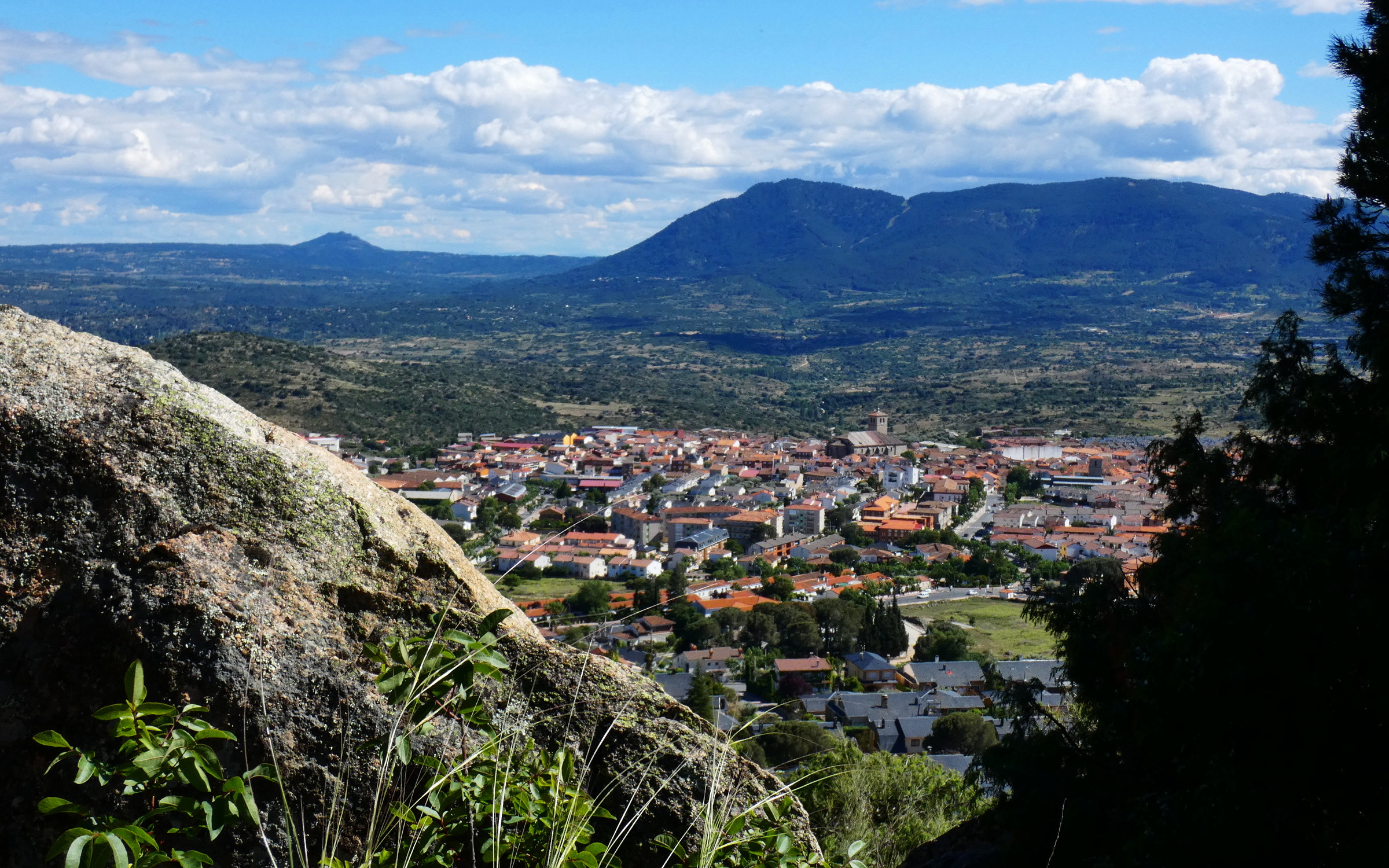

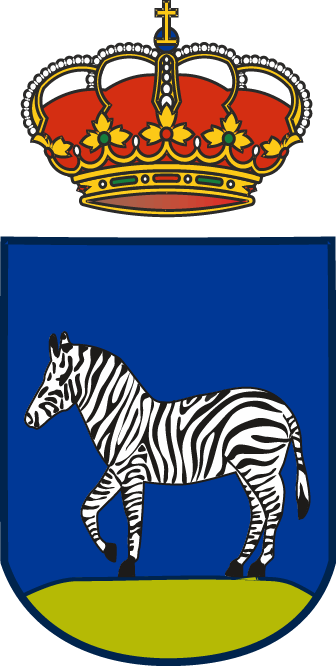
- Flag Coat of arms
- Interactive map of Cebreros
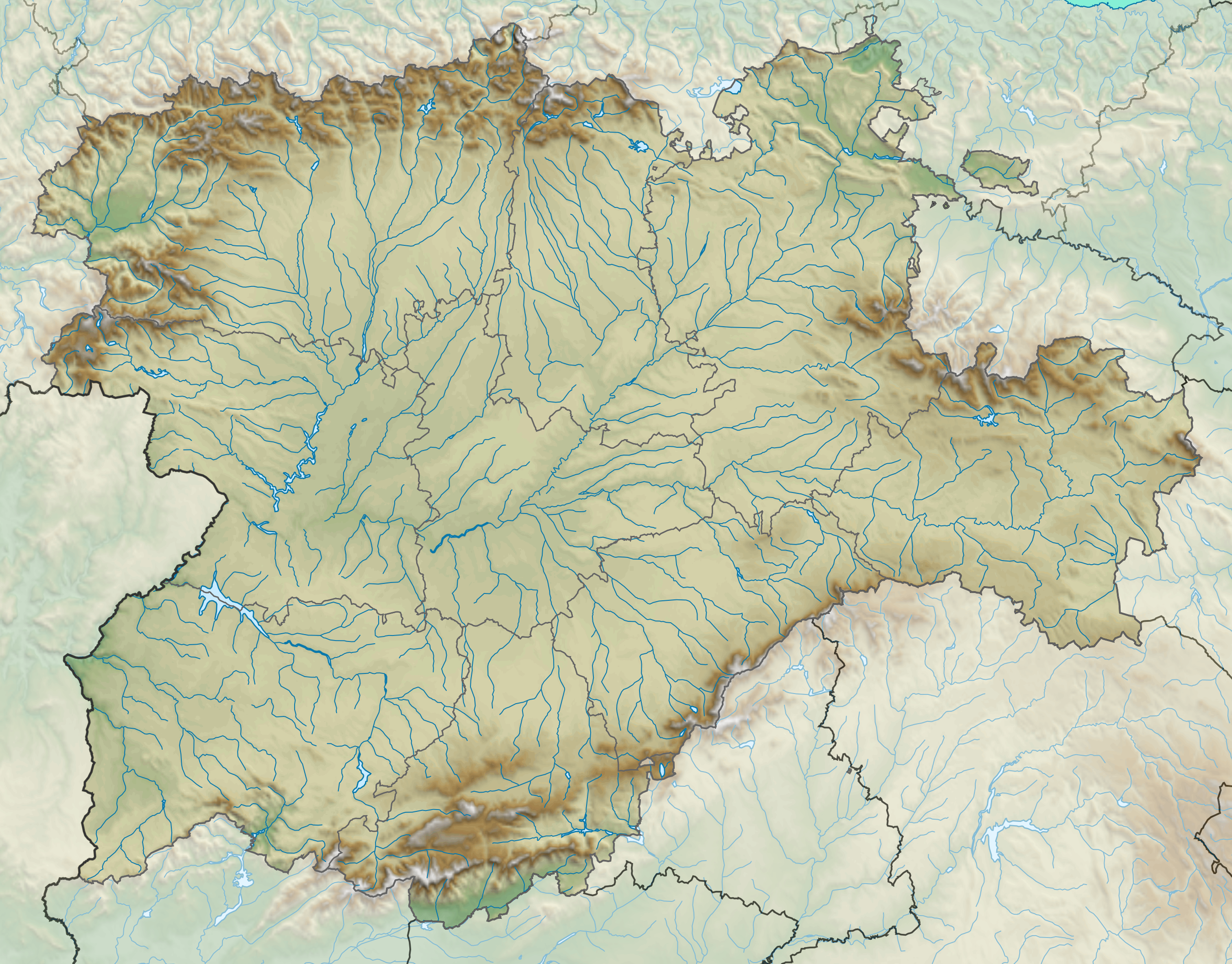
- Location within Castile and León Location within Spain
- Coordinates: 40°27′18″N 4°27′53″W
- Country: Spain
- Autonomous community: Castile and León
- Province: Ávila

Area
  - Total: 137.47 km^{2} (53.08 sq mi)
- Elevation: 755 m (2,477 ft)

Population (2025-01-01)
  - Total: 3,345
  - Density: 24.33/km^{2} (63.02/sq mi)
- Time zone: UTC+1 (CET)
  - Summer (DST): UTC+2 (CEST)
- Website: Official website

Cebreros (Spanish pronunciation: [θeˈβɾeɾos]) is a municipality of Spain, located in the province of Ávila, part of the autonomous community of Castile and León.

== Placename ==
The etymological origin of the toponym is moot, and the question has sparked multiple tentative proposals. Medieval renderings of the name include Ezebreros, Zebreros, and Azebreros, with the current form appearing by the late 18th and early 19th century.

== Geography ==
Covering a total area of 137.47 km^{2}. the municipality is located in the southeast of the province and the autonomous community, bordering the Community of Madrid. The Alberche runs through the south of the municipality. The town lies at 755 metres above sea level.

== History ==
Mentions to a wine production tradition are recorded as early as 1245, involving the possession of some vines in the area by the Ávila's cathedral chapter. Sweeping changes in the 14th century in Cebreros and the Alberche area transformed the hitherto dominant landscape of grasslands and forested areas to grapevines.

== Buildings ==
The municipality hosts the Deep Space Antenna 2, an ESTRACK station for communication with spacecraft for the European Space Agency (ESA). The former palace of El Quexigal designed by Juan de Herrera on behalf of Philip II is located near the town.

== Sport ==
The local football team is CD Cebrereña.

== Population ==
Historical population
Year	Pop.	±% p.a.
2023	3,256	—
2024	3,239	−0.52%
2025	3,345	+3.27%
Source: INE

== People ==
In 2016, the local corporation posthumously declared Adolfo Suárez as Favourite Son of Cebreros and his wife Amparo Illana as Adoptive Daughter.

== Bibliography ==
- Blázquez González, Jesús Alfonso (1997). "Sobre el nombre de Cebreros" (PDF). Cuadernos Abulenses (26). Ávila: Institución Gran Duque de Alba: 195–230. ISSN 0213-0475.
- Tomé, Pedro (2023). "Continuidad y fragmentación en un paisaje vitivinícola" [Continuity and fragmentation in a wine landscape]. Gazeta de Antropología. 39 (1). ISSN 0214-7564.
