= Juan José González Rivas =

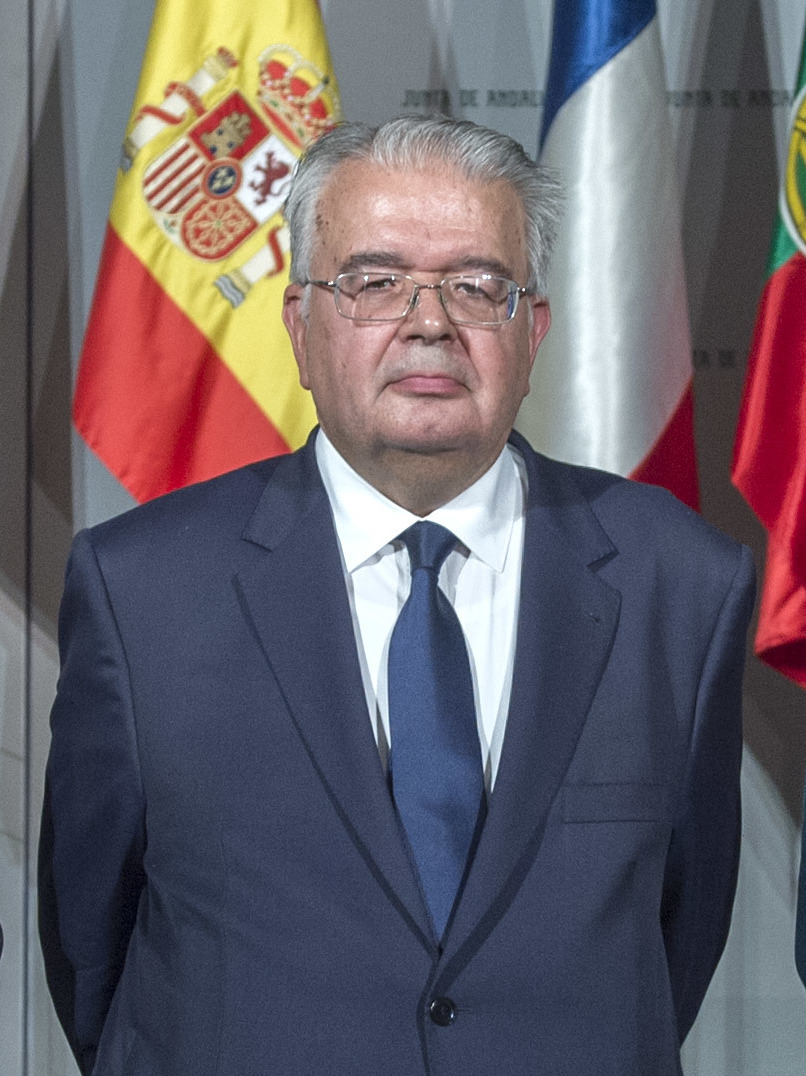
- Rivas in Seville in 2017

President of the Constitutional Court
- In office 22 March 2017 – 18 November 2021
- Monarch: Felipe VI
- Preceded by: Francisco Pérez de los Cobos
- Succeeded by: Santiago Martínez-Vares (acting)

Magistrate of the Constitutional Court
- In office 11 July 2012 – 18 November 2021
- Monarchs: Juan Carlos I (2012–14); Felipe VI (since 2014)

Personal details
- Born: May 10, 1951 (age 75) Ávila, Castille and León, Spain
- Education: Complutense University of Madrid

Juan José González Rivas (born 10 May 1951) is a Spanish jurist and magistrate. He served as President of the Spanish Constitutional Court from 2017 to 2021. He was member of this High Court from 2012 to 2021.
