= Bartolomé Clavero =

Spanish jurist and historian (1947–2022)

Bartolomé Clavero Salvador (25 May 1947 – 30 September 2022) was a Spanish jurist and historian, specialized in legal history.

Clavero was a tenured full professor at the University of Seville. His works focus on usury, majorat and the concept of State during the Ancien Régime (or its lack thereof), with a materialistic point of view and often polemical content. He was a personal friend and biographer of Francisco Tomás y Valiente, who was murdered by ETA just five minutes after they had a conversation on the phone. Clavero died on 30 September 2022, at the age of 75.

== Works ==
- Constitución a la deriva:Imprudencia de la justicia y otros desafueros. 2019. Barcelona, Ediciones de Pasado y Presente. ISBN 9788494970665
- Freedom's Law and Indigenous Rights. Berkeley, California, Estados Unidos. Robbins Collection—School of Law. 2005. 202. ISBN 1-882239-16-4
- Tratados con Otros Pueblos y Derechos de Otras Gentes en la Constitución de Estados Por América. Madrid. Centro de Estudios Políticos y Constitucionales. 2005. 150. ISBN 84-259-1286-5
- Genocidio y Justicia. la Destrucción de las Indias, Ayer y Hoy. Madrid,. Marcial Pons. 2002. ISBN 85-953794-6-7
- Ama Llunku, Abya Yala : Constituyencia Indígena y Código Ladino Por América. Madrid. Centro de Estudios Políticos y Constitucionales. 2000. 483. ISBN 84-259-1122-2
- Happy Constitution. Madrid. Trotta. 1997
- La Grâce Du Don. París. Albin Michel. 1996
- Tomás y Valiente: una Biografía Intelectual. Milán. Giuffrè. 1996
- Diritto Della Società Internazionale. Milano. Jaca Book. 1995
- Derecho Indígena y Cultura Constitucional en América. México. Siglo XXI. 1994
- Historia del Derecho: Derecho Común. Salamanca. Universidad de Salamanca. 1994
- Antidora. Antropología Católica de la Economía Moderna. Milán. Giuffrè. 1991
- Razón de Estado, Razón de Individuo, Razón de Historia. Madrid. Centro de Estudios Politicos y Constitucionales. 1991
- Manual de Historia Constitucional de España. Madrid. Alianza Editorial. 1989
- Mayorazgo. Madrid. Siglo XXI. 1989
- Los Derechos y los Jueces. Madrid. Civitas. 1988
- Tantas Personas Como Estados. Madrid. Tecnos. 1986
- Fueros Vascos. Historia en Tiempos de Constitución. Barcelona. Ariel. 1985
- Usura. del Uso Económico de la Religión en la Historia. Madrid. Tecnos. 1985
- Autonomía Regional y Reforma Agraria. Jerez. Fundación Universitaria de Jerez. 1984
- Evolución Histórica del Constitucionalismo Español. Madrid. Tecnos. 1984
- El Código y el Fuero. Madrid. Siglo XXI. 1982
