= El Quexigal =

Coordinates: 40.4577°N 4.3523°W

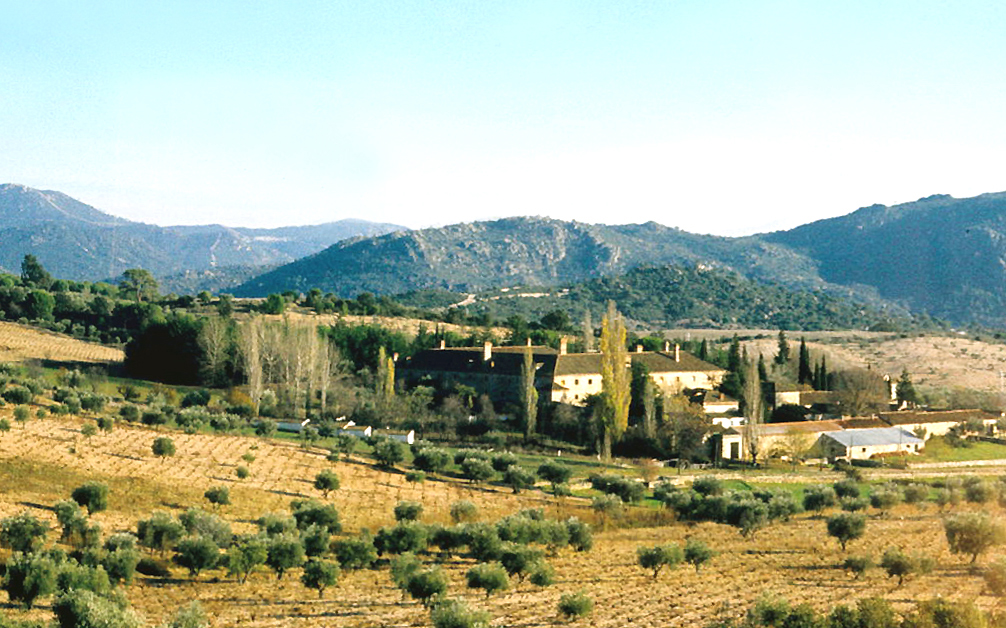
The El Quexigal palace

The El Quexigal Palace (Spanish: Palacio de El Quexigal) is a renaissance palace near Cebreros in the province of Ávila, Spain. It was constructed in 1563 during the reign of king Philip II of Spain. It was intended as a farm and a hunting lodge for the royal family, who often staid at the nearby royal site of the El Escorial. The design is by the Juan de Herrera. In the 20th century, the Hohenlohe family owned the estate. In 2023, renovations started in order to use it as a luxury hotel.

== History ==
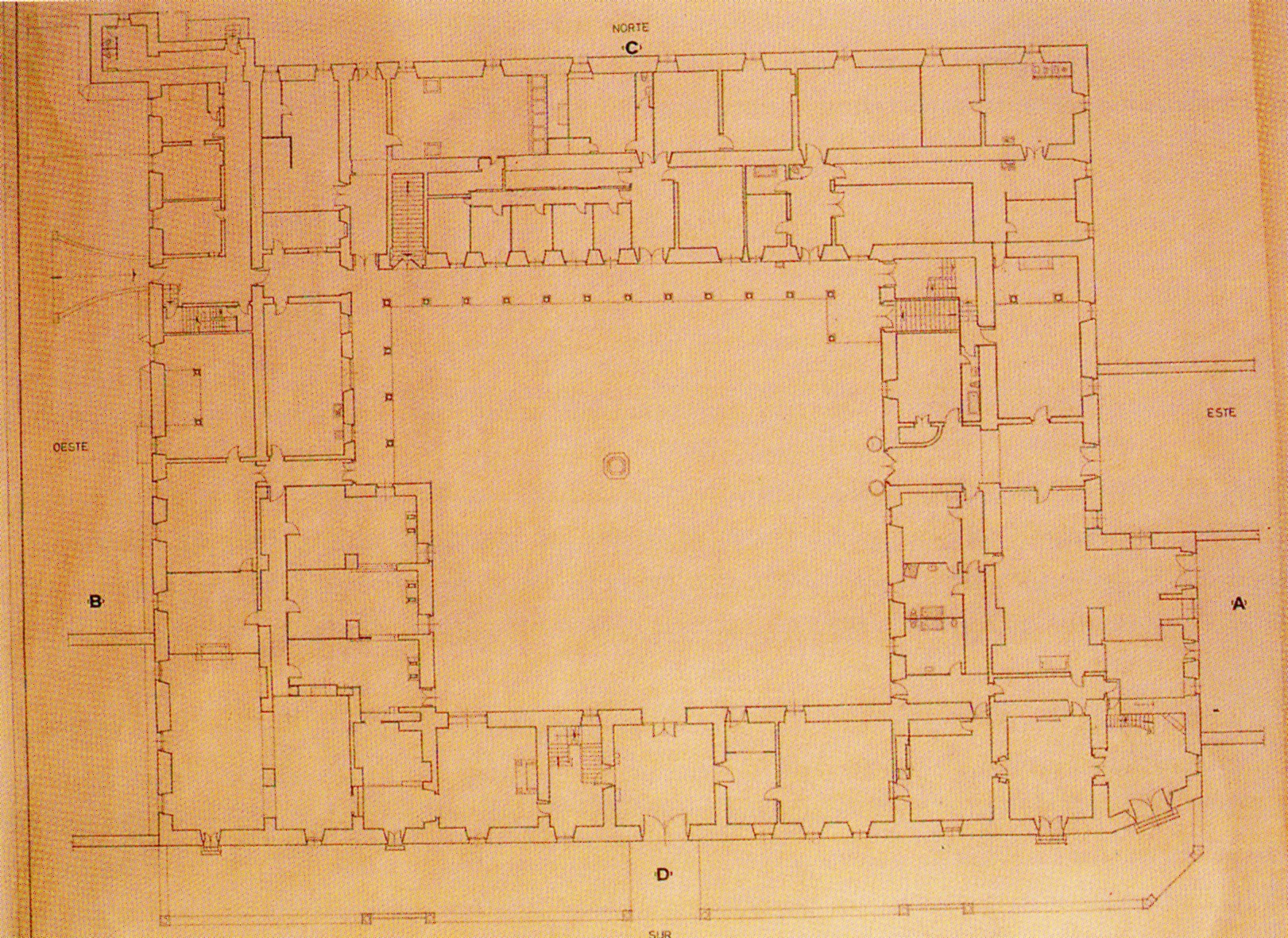
16th century floor plan of the El Quexigal palace

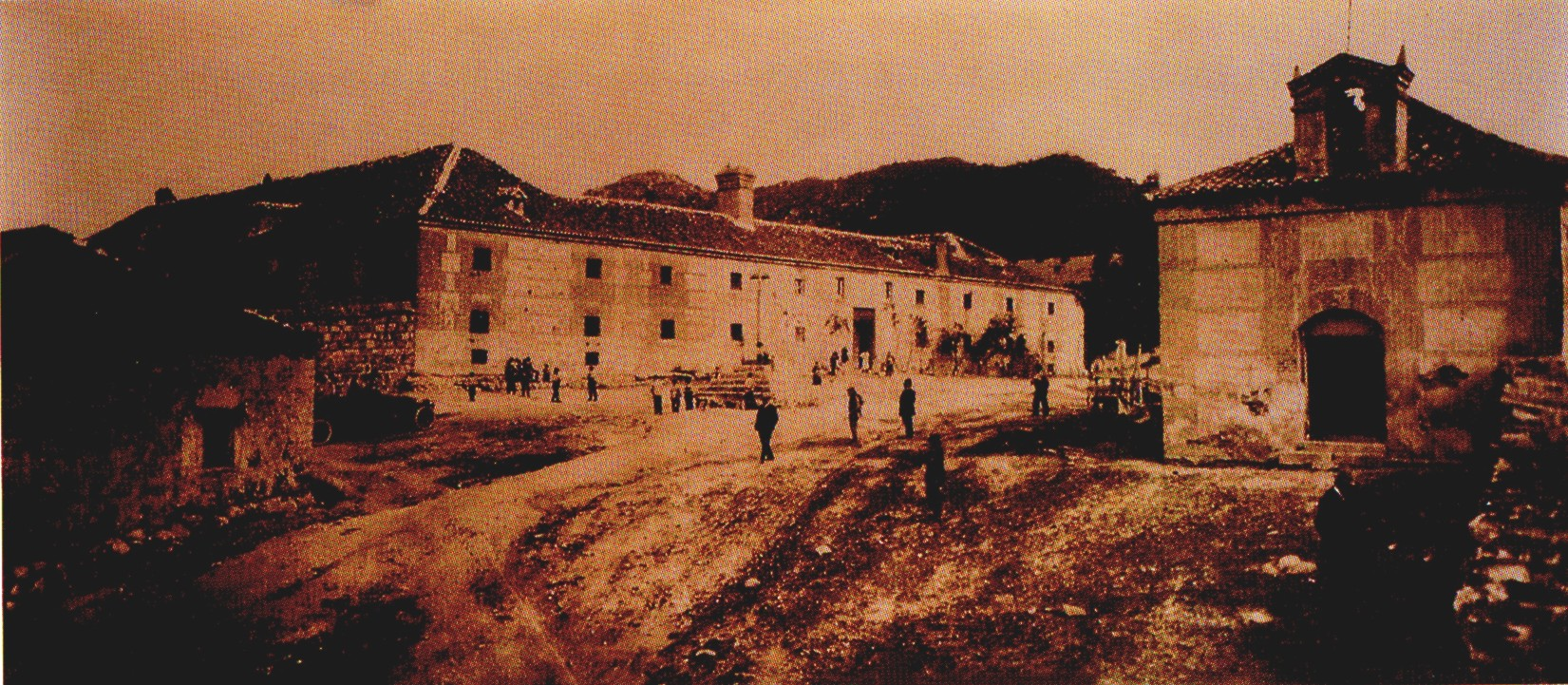
The El Quexigal palace in 1928

Quexigal was first mentioned as a farm in the 14th century. Throughout the 15th century, the estate was owned by members of a noble family of Ávila named Gómez Villalva. In 1563, ownership transferred to the Hieronymite monks of the El Escorial monastery. They acquired the estate on behalf of King Philip II (1527-1598), who visited the place various times before when he was looking for a suitable site to build a monastery in honor of San Lorenzo.

The estate provided timber for the construction of the royal site of El Escorial. Once all the pines were felled, vines and olives were cultivated at the estate in order to supply the monastery with olives and vegetables, honey and wax, and wine. Besides being a farm, Quexigal was place of recreation and rest for the monks, as well as for the royal family, who went hunting within the reserve.

The architect Juan de Herrera (1530-1597) designed and constructed a royal lodge. The palace was considered as one of the most luxurious houses in renaissance Europe. King Philip II stayed at the mansion when travelling to the monastery of El Escorial.

For the next three centuries, the Hieronymite monks of the El Escorial monastery were responsible for the administration of the palace and the estate, either managing it directly or delegating it to tenants. Also, the lodge continued to receive royal visitors such as kings Philip IV, Charles II, and Charles IV.

In 1837, due to the confiscation of monastic property, the estate became part of the assets of the Spanish crown. In 1869, it was sold and became property of the Sainz de Heredia family, and later the Valenzualas family.

In 1926, Trinidad von Scholtz-Hermensdorff, the widowed Duchess of Parcent, acquired the estate. She carried out expensive renovations before she passed it on as a wedding gift to her daughter Doña María de la Piedad de Yturbe von Scholtz-Hermensdorff, 3rd Marchioness of Belvís de las Navas (1892-1990), who was married to Prince Max Egon of Hohenlohe-Langenburg (1897-1968),a member of the Bohemian branch of the Hohenlohe family. The Hohenlohe family turned the palace into a splendid place of recreation and rest.

The house became famous for its collections. Gobelin tapestries adorned its hall and galleries, as well as paintings by artists such as Berruguete, Murillo, El Greco, Gallegos, Aponte, Tiépolo, Carrero and László. In addition, the dining room contained a splendid collection of Talavera porcelain (around 3,400 pieces). Also notable was a collection of more than a dozen very ancient tapestries from Cuenca and more than two hundred polychrome carvings, among which the twelve apostles stood out. The library housed about five thousand books including some outstanding incunables.

In 1956, the house suffered a fire that completely destroyed it. Most of its collections was lost, although various jewels were saved, such as the famous Hohenlohe diadem.

In 1979, the remaining contents were auctioned at Sotheby's. The estate was sold by the Hohenlohe family to the Eulen Group, who is the owner till the current day. They produce white wine and honey at the estate. In 2023, renovations started to create a luxury hotel in the palace. The hotel is expected to open in 2027.

== Literature ==
- Auction Catalogue: El Quexigal Propiedad de la familia Hohenlohe. Sotheby’s. 1979.
- Sánchez Meco, Gregorio (2001). La Real Casa de El Quexigal y su Entorno (in Spanish). Grupo Eulen, Edilesa. p. 237. ISBN 9788480123778.
- Chías Navarro, Pilar (2014). "Fincas y Cazaderos Reales en El Entorno del Monasterio de San Lorenzo de El Escorial: Tradición Medieval e Influencia Flamenca / The Royal Country Estates around the Monastery of El Escorial: Medieval Tradition and Flemish Influence". EGA. Revista de Expresión Gráfica Arquitectónica (in Spanish). 23: 46–53. doi:10.4995/EGA.2014.2171. hdl:10251/75868. S2CID 190730266.
- Blanco Basaldua, Maria Celia (2022). Ermita del Palacio de El Quexigal; Estudio de Lesiones y Propuesta de Rehabilitación (PDF) (Thesis) (in Spanish). Universidad Politécnica de Madria.
