= Corrales del Vino =

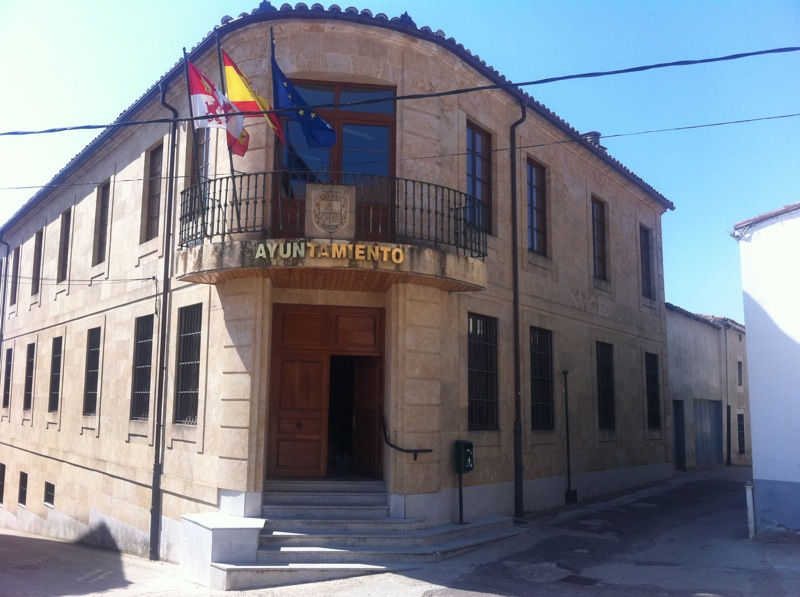

- Coat of arms

- Corrales del Vino within the map of Spain
- Coordinates: 41.357878°N 5.725614°W
- Country: Spain
- Autonomous community: Castile and León
- Province: Zamora
- Municipality: Corrales del Vino

Population (2025-01-01)
  - Total: 930
- Time zone: UTC+1 (CET)
  - Summer (DST): UTC+2 (CEST)
- Website: Official web

Corrales del Vino is a municipality in the province of Zamora, Castile and León, Spain.

In addition to the namesake locality, the municipality also comprises the settlements of Fuente el Carnero and Peleas de Arriba.

== See also ==
- Pablo Montesino Cáceres (1781–1849); born in Fuente el Carnero
