= Puente de Segovia, Madrid =

Bridge of Segovia
- Puente de Segovia (Spanish)
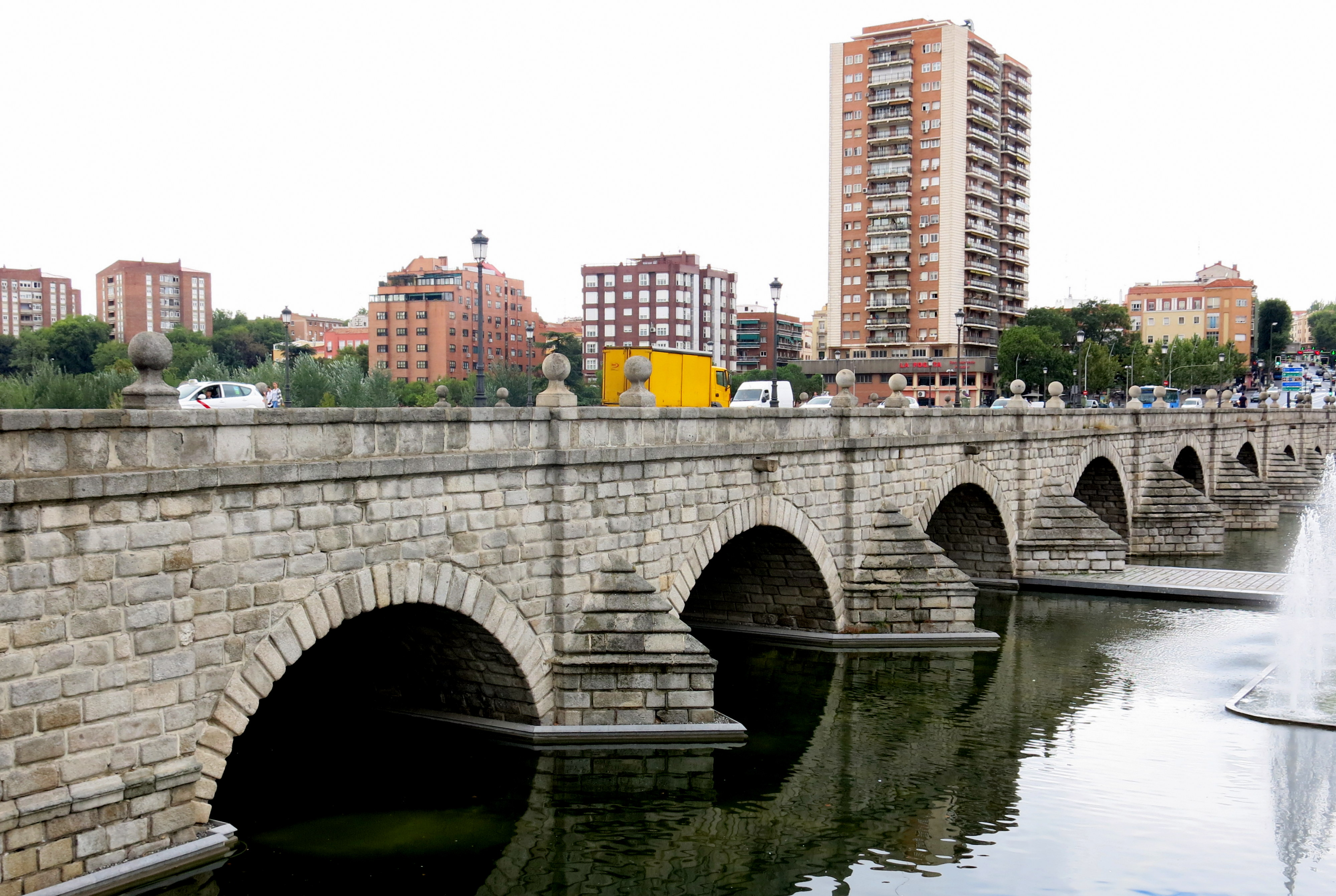

- Location within Spain
- 40.414012°N 3.722955°W
- Location: Madrid, Spain

History
- Built: 1582-1584

Site notes
- Architect: Juan de Herrera

Spanish Cultural Heritage
- Official name: Puente de Segovia
- Type: Non-movable
- Criteria: Monument
- Designated: 1996
- Reference no.: RI-51-0009278

The Bridge of Segovia (Spanish: Puente de Segovia) is a bridge located in Madrid, Spain, crossing the Manzanares river. It was declared Bien de Interés Cultural in 1996.

Designed by Juan de Herrera under commission of King Philip II of Spain, it was built from 1582 to 1584 with a total of nine spans. It cost 200,000 ducats. The bridge is composed of bricks of granite.
