= Manuel García Pelayo =

Spanish political scientist

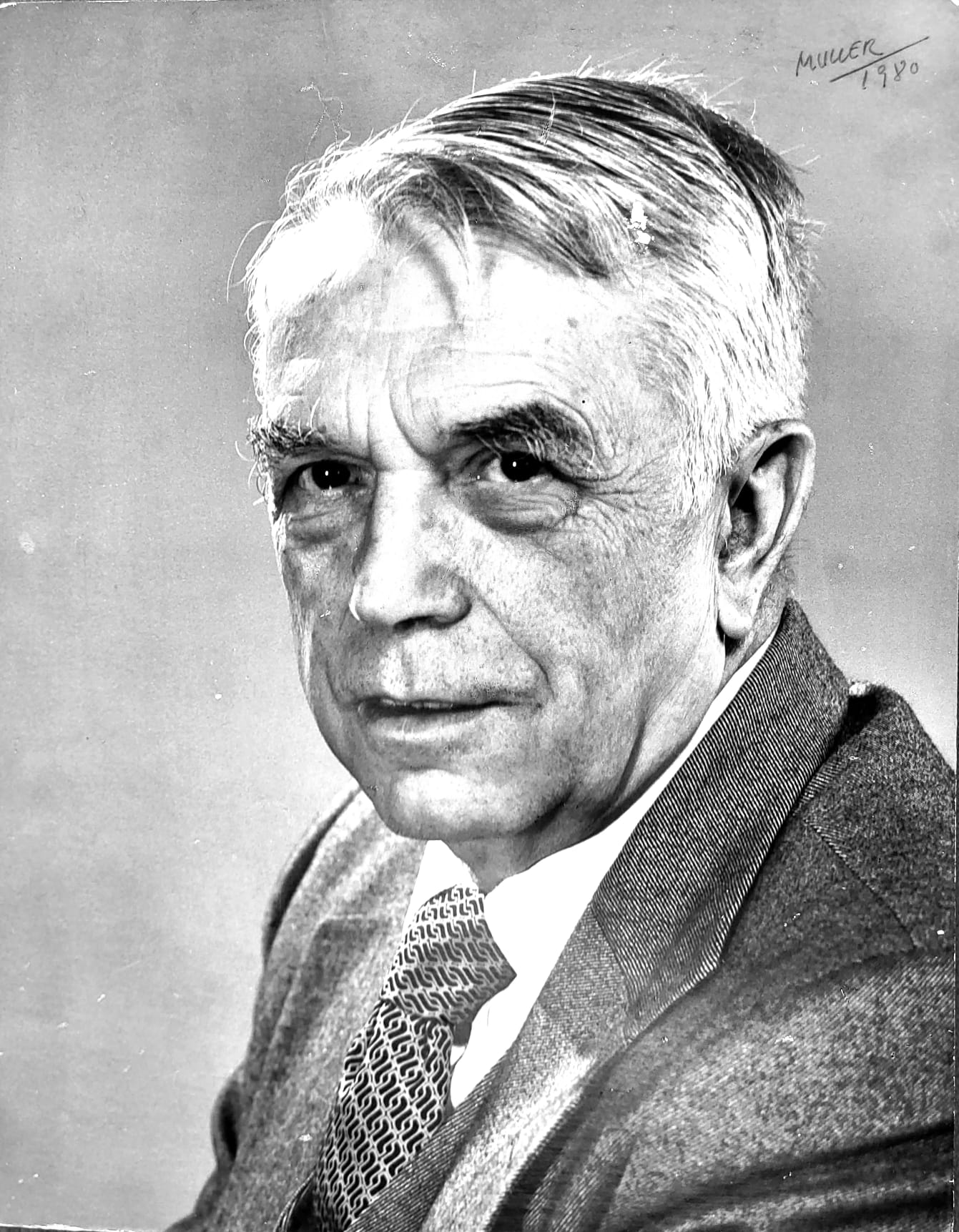
Manuel Garcia Pelayo 1980

Manuel García Pelayo (May 23, 1909 – February 25, 1991), prominent Spanish political scientist and jurist. He was the founder of the modern Department of Political Science of the Central University of Venezuela and was elected President of the Constitutional Court of Spain in 1980.

== Biography ==
Born in Corrales del Vino, Zamora Province, García Pelayo attended high school at the Institute of Zamora (1926) and later moved to Madrid, where he studied law at the Universidad Central until (1934). He obtained a scholarship from the Junta de Ampliación de Estudios and studied at the University of Vienna in Austria. When on July 18, 1936, the Spanish Civil War started, he enlisted in the Spanish Republican Army even though his father and brother were fighting for the Nationalist side. He fought in several battles and became a captain in the General Staff. When the civil war ended he was sent to concentration camps and put into prison until 1941. Once he was released, he married Mercedes Velásquez Fernández-Pimentel. In 1947, he was invited to teach at the Instituto de Estudios Políticos de Madrid by its director Francisco Javier Conde. In 1950, he became well known in the academic world with the publication of a work on comparative constitutional law (entitled Derecho Constitucional Comparado), which became a landmark in this area for the Spanish language and went through over 20 editions.

In 1951, he travelled to Argentina and began practicing as an attorney while teaching law at the Universidad de Buenos Aires. In 1954, taught political science at the University of Puerto Rico until 1958 when the Department of Government and Law of the Central University of Venezuela hired him to start a new Institute and Department of Political Science. He taught and published many books during these years until his retirement in 1979. In 1980, he returned to Spain, after an invitation from King Juan Carlos I to become part in the recently created Constitutional Court of Spain. He was then elected President of the Court, position that he occupied until 1986. The following year García Pelayo returned to Caracas, where he died in 1991 after a long illness.

The Institute of Comparative Public Law of the Universidad Carlos III of Spain was named after García Pelayo in 1997.

== Works ==
- Auctoritas. Caracas: Universidad Central de Venezuela, Facultad de Derecho, 1969
- Burocracia y tecnocracia y otros escritos. Madrid: Alianza, 1984
- Ciencia política: introducción elemental a la teoría general de sistemas. Caracas: s.n., 1975
- Las culturas del libro. Caracas: Monte Ávila, 1976
- Del mito y de la razón en la historia del pensamiento político. Madrid: Revista de Occidente, 1968
- Derecho constitucional. 5ª ed. Madrid: Manuales de la Revista de Occidente, 1959
- Derecho constitucional comparado. 4ª ed. Madrid: Alianza, 1984
- El estado de partidos. Madrid: Editorial Alianza, 1986
- El estado social y sus implicaciones. México: Universidad Nacional Autónoma de México, 1975
- La estratificación social de los países desarrollados. Caracas: Universidad Central de Venezuela, Facultad de Derecho, 1975
- Federico II de Suabia y el nacimiento del Estado moderno. Caracas: Fundación García Pelayo, 1994
- Las formas políticas en el antiguo Oriente. Caracas: Monte Ávila, 1993
- Idea de la política y otros escritos. Madrid: Centro de Estudios Constitucionales, 1983
- Ideología e iconología. Caracas: Universidad Central de Venezuela, 1963
- Las funciones de los parlamentos bicamerales. Caracas: Ediciones del Congreso de la República, 1971
- Los mitos políticos. Madrid: Alianza Editorial, 1981
- Obras completas. Madrid: Centro de Estudios Constitucionales, 1993. 3 v.
- Las transformaciones del Estado contemporáneo. 2ª ed. Madrid: Alianza, 1985
