= President of the Constitutional Court (Spain) =

- Coat of Arms of Spain

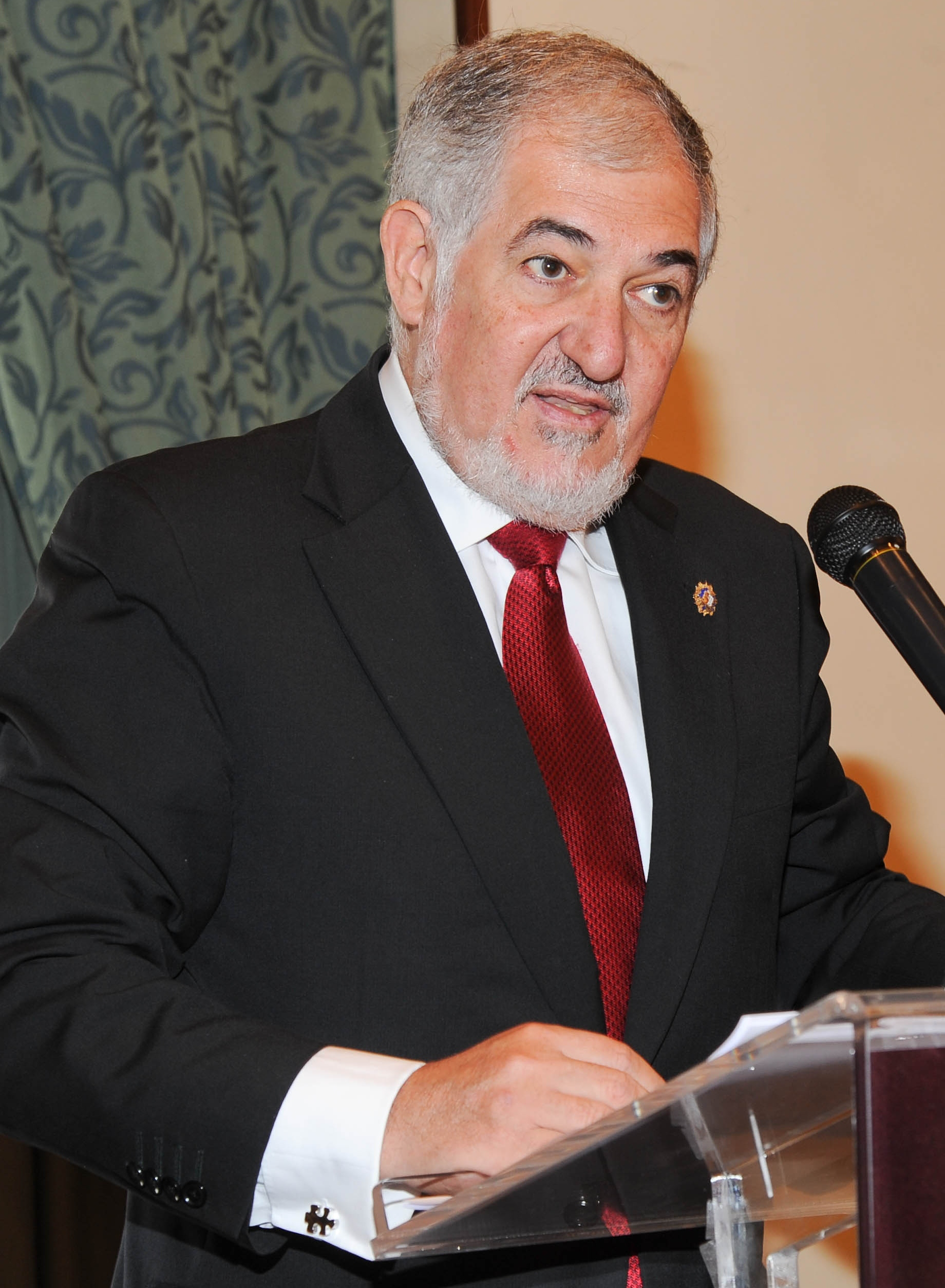
- Incumbent; Cándido Conde-Pumpido since January 12, 2023
- Abbreviation: PTC
- Member of: Constitutional Court
- Seat: Constitutional Court Headquarters, Madrid, Spain
- Nominator: Plenary Court
- Appointer: Monarch
- Term length: 3 years, 2 terms limit
- Constituting instrument: Constitution of 1978
- Formation: July 12, 1980; 46 years ago
- First holder: Manuel García Pelayo
- Deputy: Vice President of the Constitutional Court
- Salary: €167,169 per year
- Website: tribunalconstitucional.es

The president of the Constitutional Court (Spanish: Presidente del Tribunal Constitucional) of Spain is the head of the Constitutional Court, the highest body with the power to determine the constitutionality of acts of the Spanish central and regional governments. It is defined in Part IX (i.e. section 160) of the Constitution of Spain, and further governed by Organic Laws 2/1979 (a.k.a. Law of the Constitutional Court of October 3, 1979). The court is the "supreme interpreter" of the Constitution, but since the court is not a part of the Spanish Judiciary, the Supreme Court is the highest court for all judicial matters.

The president, as the highest authority of the Court, exercises its representation and presides over the Plenary, as well as presides over the First Chamber. The president is appointed by the Monarch at the proposal of the rest of the Court's magistrates, who elect him or her by majority and for a three-year term with the possibility of a single reelection. In cases of vacancy, absence or other legal reason, he is substituted by the vice president, who presides over the Second Chamber.

The Presidency of the Constitutional Court, created by the 1978 Constitution and effective since 1980, has as its direct predecessor the Presidency of the Constitutional Guarantees Court, a body similar to the Constitutional Court and which had Álvaro de Albornoz as president between 1933 and 1934, Fernando Gasset between 1934 and 1936 and Pedro Vargas Guerendiain as acting president from 1936 until the end of the Spanish Civil War.

The current and 12th president of Court is Cándido Conde-Pumpido since January 2023.

== Functions ==
The President of the Constitutional Court, in accordance with the Constitutional Court Act of 1979:

- It exercises the representation of the Court.
- Summons and chairs the Plenary Court and convenes the court's chambers
- Chairs the First Chamber
- It adopts the necessary measures for the functioning of the Court, Chambers and Sections.
- It communicates the vacancies of the courts justices to the Cortes, the Government or to the General Council of the Judiciary.
- Appoints the counsels, clerks, calls the competitive examinations and contests to cover the positions of civil servants and positions hired staff.
- It exercises administrative powers over the staff of the Court.

== Election ==
The Plenary of the Court elects from its members, by secret ballot, its President for a period of three years and proposes its appointment to the King.

For its election is required to reach in the first ballot the absolute majority; if this majority is not reached, it will be elected in the second ballot that obtains the greatest number of votes; In the event of a tie, a final vote shall be taken and if it is repeated, the senior magistrate shall be proposed for the office of President and, in the case of equal seniority, the oldest candidate bye age.

If the three-year term for which he was appointed did not coincide with the renewal of the Constitutional Court, that term of office shall be extended to end at the time the renewal occurs and the new judges take office.

=== Oath ===
The President and other Judges of the Constitutional Court shall, upon assuming office before the King, give the following oath or promise:

«I swear (or promise) to faithfully obey and enforce at all times the Spanish Constitution, with loyalty to the Crown and to fulfill my duties as Constitutional Magistrate.»

Spanish: «Juro (o prometo) guardar y hacer guardar fielmente y en todo tiempo la Constitución española, con lealtad a la Corona y cumplir mis deberes como Magistrado Constitucional.»

== List of presidents of the Court ==
Since its creation, 12 people have served as president of the Constitutional Court. The first president was Manuel García Pelayo who served from 1980 to 1986. The shortest presidency was that of Pedro González-Trevijano who served 1 year, 47 days from 2021 to 2022, while the longest was that of María Emilia Casas who served 6 years, 210 days from 2004 to 2011. She was also the first and only woman to hold the office.

| President | | Tenure | Tenure length | Nominated by | Monarch |
|---|---|---|---|---|---|
| 1 | Manuel García Pelayo (1909–1991) | July 12, 1980 – February 21, 1986 | 5 years, 224 days | Senate | Juan Carlos I |
| 2 | Francisco Tomás y Valiente (1932–1996) | March 6, 1986 – July 8, 1992 | 6 years, 124 days | Congress of Deputies | Juan Carlos I |
| 3 | Miguel Rodríguez-Piñero y Bravo-Ferrer (1935–) | July 17, 1992 – April 8, 1995 | 2 years, 265 days | Government | Juan Carlos I |
| 4 | Álvaro Rodríguez Bereijo (1938–) | April 24, 1995 – December 17, 1998 | 3 years, 237 days | Senate | Juan Carlos I |
| 5 | Pedro Cruz Villalón (1946–) | December 22, 1998 – November 8, 2001 | 2 years, 321 days | Congress of Deputies | Juan Carlos I |
| 6 | Manuel Jiménez de Parga (1929–2014) | November 14, 2001 – June 9, 2004 | 2 years, 208 days | Government | Juan Carlos I |
| 7 | María Emilia Casas (1950–) | June 16, 2004 – January 12, 2011 | 6 years, 210 days | Senate | Juan Carlos I |
| 8 | Pascual Sala (1935–) | January 24, 2011 – June 13, 2013 | 2 years, 140 days | General Council of the Judiciary | Juan Carlos I |
| 9 | Francisco Pérez de los Cobos (1962–) | June 20, 2013 – March 15, 2017 | 3 years, 268 days | Senate | Juan Carlos I |
| 10 | Juan José González Rivas (1951–) | March 23, 2017 – November 18, 2021 | 4 years, 240 days | Congress of Deputies | Juan Carlos I |
| 10 | Juan José González Rivas (1951–) | March 23, 2017 – November 18, 2021 | 4 years, 240 days | Congress of Deputies | Felipe VI |
| 11 | Pedro González-Trevijano (1958–) | November 23, 2021 – January 9, 2023 | 1 year, 47 days | Government | Felipe VI |
| 12 | Cándido Conde-Pumpido (1949–) | January 12, 2023 – present | 3 years, 238 days | Senate | Felipe VI |

== See also ==
- Constitution
