= Danilo da Silva (disambiguation) =

Danilo da Silva is a Portuguese name, may refer to:

- Danilo Aparecido da Silva (born 1986), or Danilo Silva, Brazilian footballer
- Danilo Luiz da Silva (born July 1991), Brazilian footballer
- Danilo Pereira da Silva (born 1999), Brazilian footballer
- Danilo Clementino (born 1982), full name Emmanuel Danilo Clementino Silva, Brazilian footballer who played for Equatorial Guinea

== See also ==
- Daniel da Silva (disambiguation)
- Daniel Silva (disambiguation)
