= Daniel da Silva =

Daniel da Silva may refer to:

- Dan DaSilva (born 1985), Canadian ice hockey player
- Daniel da Silva (mathematician) (1814–1878), Portuguese mathematician
- Daniel Dutra da Silva (born 1988), Brazilian tennis player
- Daniel da Silva (footballer, born 1973), Brazilian international footballer
- Daniel Da Silva (soccer, born 1998), Canadian soccer player
- Daniel da Silva Carvalho (born 1983), Brazilian international footballer known as Daniel Carvalho
- Daniel da Silva Soares (born 1982), Portuguese footballer known as Dani
- Daniel Alves da Silva (born 1983), Brazilian international footballer known as Dani Alves
- Daniel Marques da Silva (born 1983), Brazilian footballer known as Daniel Marques

== Related pages ==
- Daniel De Silva, Australian footballer
- Daniel Silva (disambiguation)
- Danilo da Silva (disambiguation)
