= Pedro Álvarez Holguín =

Spanish conquistador

General Pedro Álvarez Holguín de Ulloa

Conquistador at the service of the Spanish Empire
- Monarch: Charles I

Personal details
- Born: 1490 Cáceres, Extremadura, Spain
- Died: September 16, 1542 (aged 51–52) near Ayacucho, Peru
- Spouse: Beatriz Tupac Yupanqui
- Occupation: Politician
- Profession: Army officer

Military service
- Allegiance: Spain
- Branch/service: Spanish Army
- Years of service: 1510–1542
- Rank: General
- Battles/wars: Battle of Las Salinas; Battle of Chupas

Pedro Álvarez Holguín (1490 – September 16, 1542) was a Spanish nobleman, politician, military man and conquistador who took part in the Conquest of Peru.

== Biography ==
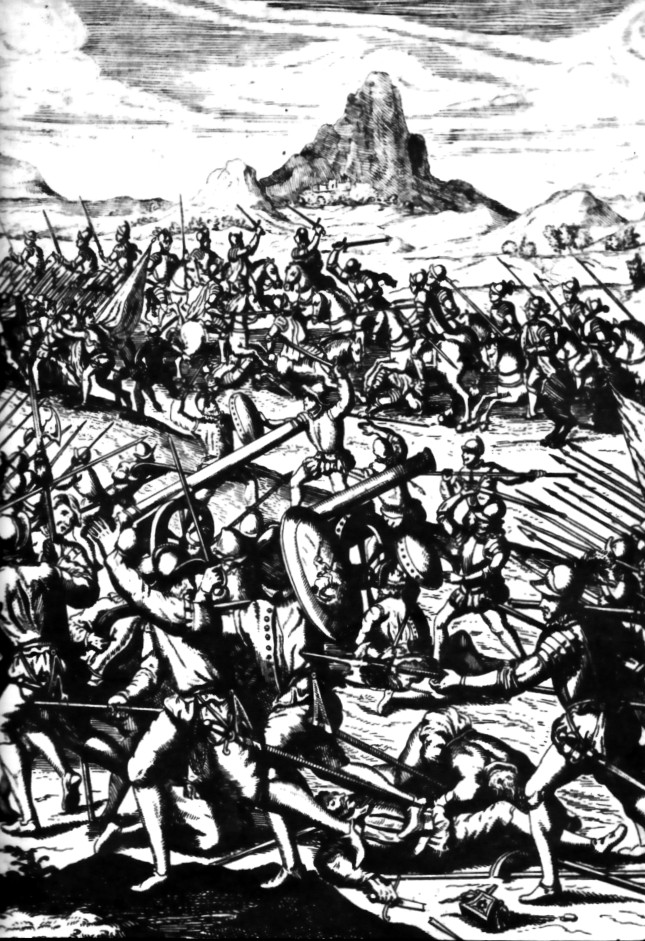
Battle of Chupas, during which Holguín was assassinated

Holguín was born in 1490 in Cáceres, Extremadura (Crown of Castile), son of Pedro Álvarez Golfín and Constanza de Aldana, belonging to families of hidalgos, among whose ancestors were Diego García de Mayoralgo, Lord of the Tower of Mayoralgo.

He had arrived in New Spain around 1530, taking an active part in the conquest of Peru, being also part of the help received, by Francisco Pizarro, to suppress the great rebellion that had driven the warrior Manco-Cápac in Cuzco. He also supported Pizarro against the army of Diego de Almagro, participating in the battle of Las Salinas.

After Pizarro's assassination, he supported the new Spanish governor Cristóbal Vaca de Castro against the rebellion of Diego de Almagro II “El Mozo”. On September 16, 1542 Pedro Álvarez Holguín was killed by a musket shot, during the Battle of Chupas, at the age of 52.

== Family ==
Pedro Álvarez Holguín was married to Beatriz Tupac Yupanqui, an Inca princess, daughter of Túpac Huallpa and granddaughter of Emperor of Peru Huayna Capac. He and his wife were parents of two daughters: Constanza Holguín de Orellana, and María Holguín de Aldana, married to Martin Monje. A daughter of this marriage Juana Holguín de Ulloa, was married to the noble Brazilian João de Melo Coutinho, grandson of Vasco Fernandes Coutinho, and descendant of Gonçalo Vasques Coutinho, 2º marechal de Portugal.

Pedro Álvarez Holguín de Ulloa, was the ancestor of Captain Juan de Cáceres Ulloa, born in Buenos Aires.
