= Rafael Pinochet Cáceres =

Chilean politician (1898–1989)

Member of the Chamber of Deputies
- In office 15 May 1933 – 15 May 1937

Personal details
- Born: 11 October 1898 Quillota, Chile
- Died: 11 June 1989 (aged 90) Quillota, Chile
- Party: Conservative Party
- Spouse: Amelia Barros (m. 6 January 1918)
- Children: 6
- Occupation: Politician

Juan Agustín Rafael Pinochet Cáceres (11 October 1898, in Quillota – 11 June 1989, in Quillota) was a Chilean politician.

Son of Agustín Pinochet and Joaquina Cáceres, Pinochet Cáceres first worked as independent worker.

Member of the Conservative Party, in 1932 he was elected to the 1933-1937 legislature of the Chilean Chamber of Deputies, representing the Sixth Departmental Grouping "Quillota and Valparaíso". In the Chamber of Deputies, he was member of the Standing Committee on Agriculture and Colonization.

He also was candidate in the 1937 Chilean parliamentary election, without success.

He also served as Mayor of Quillota and Governor of the Quillota Province.
