= Antonio Blázquez y Delgado-Aguilera =

Spanish geographer, historian and bibliographer

Antonio Blázquez y Delgado-Aguilera (1859 – February 14, 1950) was a Spanish geographer, historian and bibliographer.
