= Juan de Cáceres y Ulloa =

Organist of Buenos Aires Metropolitan Cathedral
- Preceded by: Juan Vizcaíno de Agüero
- Succeeded by: ?

Personal details
- Born: 1618 Buenos Aires, Viceroyalty of Peru
- Died: 1682 (aged 63–64) Buenos Aires, Viceroyalty of Peru
- Occupation: Military man
- Profession: Musician

Military service
- Allegiance: Spain
- Rank: Captain

Juan de Cáceres y Ulloa (1618–1682) was a Spanish nobleman and musician, who served as organist of Buenos Aires Metropolitan Cathedral. He was the first musician of the Río de la Plata, together with Juan Vizcaíno de Agüero.

== Biography ==
Cáceres was born in Buenos Aires, the son of Alonso de Cáceres and María Coutinho, belonging to a noble Creole family of Spanish and Portuguese roots. His grandfather was Felipe de Cáceres, who served as interim governor of Paraguay between 1565 and 1572. His mother María, was daughter of Juan López and Isabel de Melo Coutinho, a noble woman descendant of Vasco Fernandes Coutinho and Pedro Álvarez Holguín de Ulloa.

Juan de Cáceres y Ulloa was a disciple of Juan Vizcaíno de Agüero, organist of Cathedral of Buenos Aires. He was hired in the post of organist of the Eglise, with a salary of 100 pesos a year, in replacement of Aguero. He took over the organ, and the plainchant of the Cathedral, and he remained during a period of nearly 30 years.
