= Rosa Mirambell i Càceres =

Rosa Mirambell i Caceres (1933 Barcelona) Catalan painter and engraver. She studied at Escola de la Llotja and at Escola de Belles Arts de Sant Jordi (Facultat de Belles Arts of the Universitat de Barcelona), where she received her doctorate. She won several international awards such as Matilde Lorovere of Naples, the Salon International d'Arts Plastiques de Béziers and the Accademia Internazionale di Arte Moderna of Rome. She has made numerous exhibitions, both individual and collective, from 1980 onwards, mainly in Barcelona and Cadaqués. She has works in museums and galleries such as the Museo Zabaleta of Jaen, or the Museu Tèxtil i d'Indumentària; and in Lleonart and Fort galleries. She has written on art theory and essays, for example: Música per a pintors (i vice versa). Barcelona: Abadia de Montserrat, 2008. Her personal background consisting of matrices, prints and illustrated books, is preserved in the Biblioteca de Catalunya.
