= Vesna Cáceres =

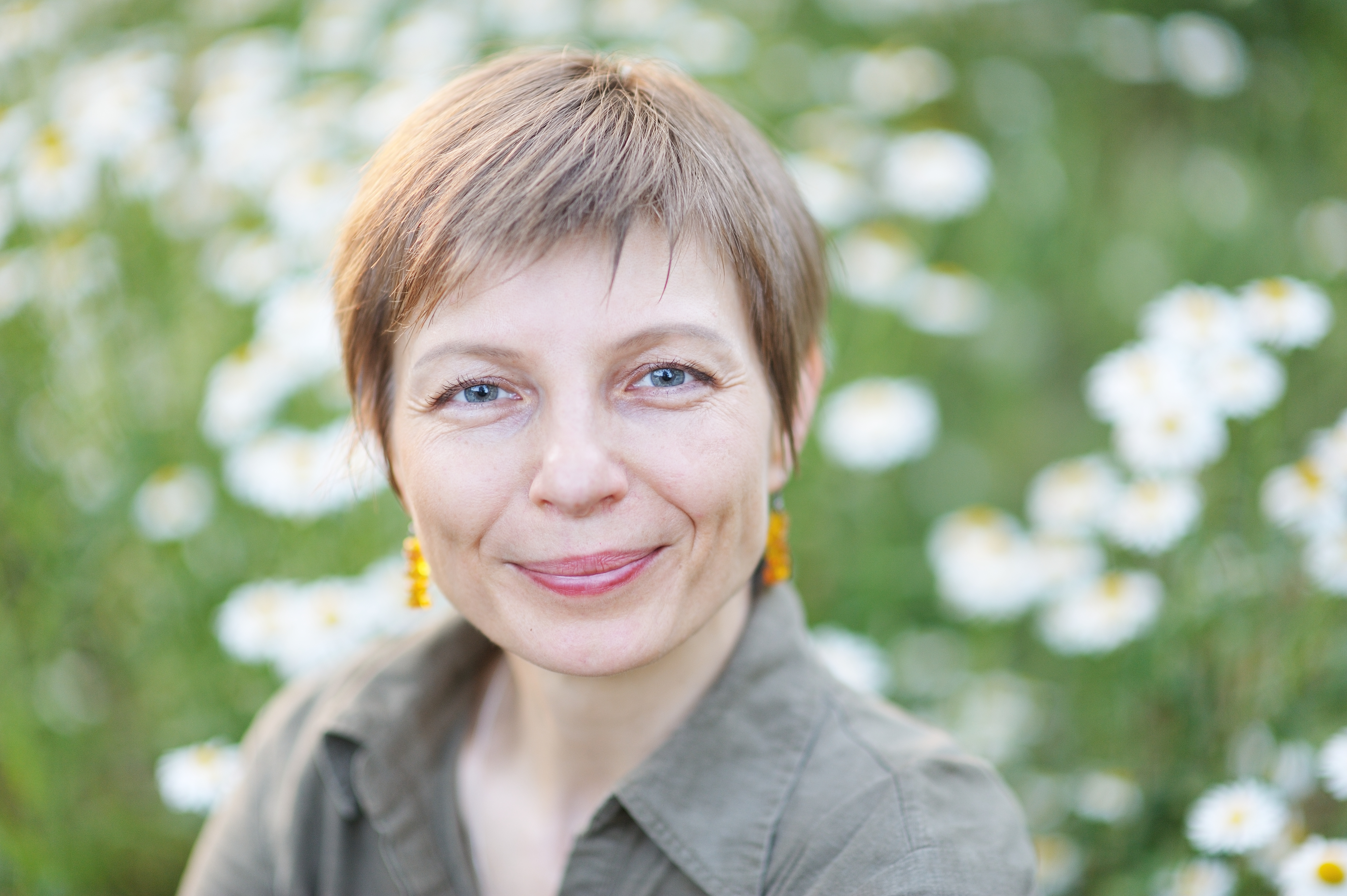

Background information
- Born: Vesna Vaško; 5 May 1971 (age 55); Sisak, SR Croatia, SFR Yugoslavia
- Occupations: composer, singer
- Instrument: accordion
- Years active: 1993–present

Vesna Vaško (born 5 May 1971), known by the stage name Vesna Cáceres, is a Czech composer, singer, and accordionist.

== Background ==
Vesna Vaško was born in Croatia in a Czech-Slovenian family. She has lived in Prague since 1990.

== Education ==
She studied the accordion in Croatia. In 1990, she came to study musicology at Charles University in Prague. In addition to musicology, she studied singing at the Jaroslav Ježek Conservatory, sang in the vocal sextet Prestissimo with Big Band of Radio Prague. In 1993, she represented the Czech Republic in the World Youth Choir.

== Career ==
In 1996, she founded her group Anima Band together with the Mexican guitarist Pablo Ortiz. With Anima, she performed in clubs, at concerts and festivals in the Czech Republic and abroad, with a repertoire that included original arrangements of Brazilian and Latin American music and her own compositions. For four years she moderated the Czech-Spanish program Contacto Latino at Radio 1.

Since the late nineties she has expanded her repertoire to include jazz standards and her own jazz compositions. With a repertoire of swing & bossa she performs at jazz clubs in the Czech Republic and abroad.

In 2004, she began a solo career as a chanson singer interpreting songs to texts by French and Czech poets, as well as her own songs, accompanying on accordion. Since 2004, she has participated in various theatre projects, writing and playing music for theatre performances.

== Discography ==
- Ánima cum corpo, V.I.V. Production, 1997
- Písníčky z Jugoslávie, Vaško Music 1998
- Písníčky z Jugoslávie 2, Vaško Music 2000
- Little Prince, demo 2001
- Baile, Vesna, 2002
- V lásce je všechno tajemné, demo, 2004
- Vesna Sings Gershwin, demo, 2004
- 5 elementos , Nextera, 2004
- Aquarela do Brasil, Vesna, 2008
- Vzpomínky na Jadran, 2008
- Le bal des fleurs, Vesna, 2013

== Theatre ==
- Nepřerušená píseň (2004)
- Tonka Šibenice (2004) – Divadlo v Řeznické
- Manželské vraždění (2005) – Divadlo Na Jezerce
- Zlomatka (2006) – Divadlo v Řeznické
- Čtyři polohy a jedna Vesna (2006) – Klub Lávka
- Krvavá svatba (2010) – Divadlo Rokoko
