= Francisco Caceres =

Salvadoran journalist

Francisco Cáceres
- Born: El Salvador
- Years active: 2006 - present
- Awards: 2014, 2015 & 2017 Daytime Emmy Award
- Website: www.francisco-caceres.com

Francisco Cáceres is a three-time Emmy winning TV journalist and producer. He's currently a host for Telemundo’s national morning show, Un Nuevo Día; and a contributor for NBC's The Today Show and Access Hollywood.

== Early life ==
Francisco Cáceres was born and raised in Santa Ana, El Salvador. At the age of 18, he moved to San Salvador to attend Central American University UCA. There, he graduated with honors as the first of his class with a bachelor's degree in Communications.

In 2009, he moved to Madrid to earn a master's degree in Filmmaking from Madrid Film School (ECAM) and King Juan Carlos University. He later earned a Master in Public Administration from the Harvard Kennedy School of Government.

He speaks Spanish, English and French.

== Professional career ==
He started his television career at the age of 20 in El Salvador, hosting and producing various entertainment TV and radio shows like Ticket con Francisco Cáceres, his own weekly film show that started on Telecorporación Salvadoreña and eventually expanded to Cinemark movie theaters in the rest of Central America and Colombia.

In 2013, he moved to Miami to work at Telemundo, as the Network's Film Expert. That same year he started hosting a Film Review Show on DirecTV Latin America, OnCINEMA, that aired in 13 countries in South America, and he became the Main Anchor for Fandango Cine, the Spanish version of the popular Movie-Ticketing website Fandango.com.

As a correspondent, he has covered the Academy Awards, the Grammys, Latin Grammys, and the Cannes, Sundance and Toronto Film Festivals. Besides, he has interviewed some of the most important personalities in entertainment, including George Clooney, Nicole Kidman, Bono, Madonna, Woody Allen, Penélope Cruz, Jennifer López, Latin superstars Café Tacvba and Calle 13, among others. He is also a member of the Critics Choice Association, the organization that every year presents the Critics Choice Awards.

In 2017, he made his English-language debut on American television as a contributor on the CBS' Emmy winning daytime talk-show The Talk. In 2019, he started contributing for NBC's Today with Hoda & Jenna and Access Hollywood.

In 2020, he shifted from entertainment to hard news, interviewing newsmakers and politicians like Vice President-elect Kamala Harris, Dr. Anthony Fauci, Representative Alexandria Ocasio-Cortez, and human rights activist Martin Luther King III.

Behind the scenes, he has directed, written and produced 2 short films, 20 TV Spots and he has created 5 TV Shows in different genres (entertainment, sports, musicals and game shows). Furthermore, he presented his short film Bebé a primera vista (Baby at first sight) at the Short Film Corner of the Cannes Film Festival.

== Awards ==
Francisco has won three Daytime Emmy Awards as producer and correspondent for Telemundo’s Un Nuevo Día, the Best Morning Show in Spanish in 2014, 2015 & 2017.
