= Alonso de Escobar =

Spanish explorer and administrator (1545–1612)

Juan Alonso de Escobar

Personal details
- Born: 1545 Asunción, Paraguay
- Died: 1613 (aged 67–68) Buenos Aires, Argentina
- Occupation: Government
- Profession: Military

Alonso de Escobar (1545–1613) was a Spanish explorer and administrator. While in the Spanish Military, he served as Regidor of Buenos Aires during the Viceroyalty of Peru.

== Biography ==
Alonso was born in Asunción, son of Alonso de Escobar y Cáceres (conquistador). He was married in Asunción with Inés Suares de Toledo, daughter of Martín Suárez de Toledo (governor of Paraguay).

Alonso de Escobar was one of 63 neighbors who accompanied Juan de Garay in the second Foundation of Buenos Aires.
