= Juan de Herrera =

Spanish architect (1530–1593)

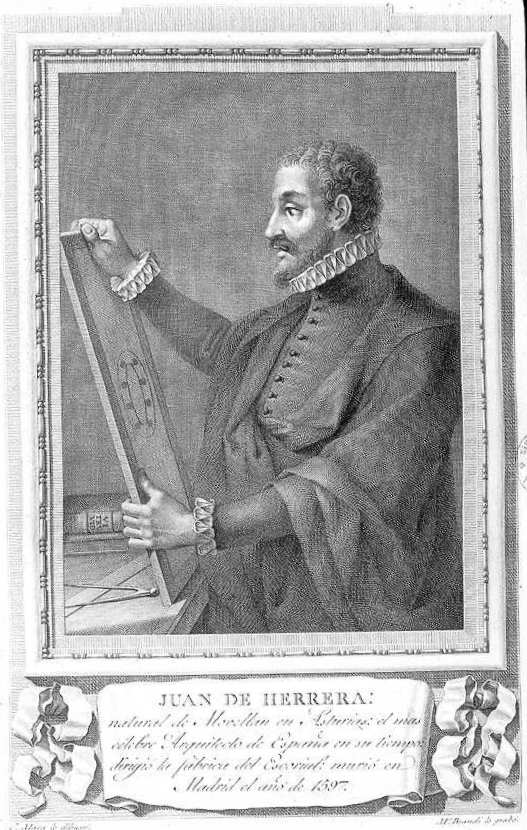
- Born: 1530; Roiz, Valdáliga, Cantabria, Spain
- Died: 15 January 1597 (aged 66–67); Madrid, Spain
- Education: University of Valladolid
- Occupation: Architect
- Buildings: El Escorial; Royal Palace of Aranjuez; Valladolid Cathedral

Juan de Herrera (1530 – 15 January 1597) was a Spanish architect, mathematician and geometrician.

One of the most outstanding Spanish architects in the 16th century, Herrera represents the peak of the Renaissance in Spain. His sober style reached full development in buildings like the Monastery of San Lorenzo de El Escorial. The Herrerian style was named after him, and was representative of the architecture of the Spanish Empire of Philip II and his Austrian successors.

Herrera was interested in many branches of knowledge. His Discurso sobre la figura cúbica (Discussion of the Cubic form) tells us about his notable knowledge about geometry and mathematics. He participated in the military campaigns of Charles V in Germany, Flanders and Italy.

== Biography ==
Hugh Trevor-Roper wrote, "Herrera had not been trained as an architect at all. Like so many of the great architects of the Renaissance, he was a complete amateur. By training he was a humanist scholar and mathematician who had accompanied Philip on his travels...." He started his architectural career in 1561 with the Royal Palace of Aranjuez. In 1562 he also made some drawings for the Libro del saber de astronomía (The Book of Astronomical Knowledge).

In 1563 he started to work under Juan Bautista de Toledo in the construction of El Escorial. After the death of de Toledo in 1567, Herrera became the main architect of the works, enlarging the plan, building the monumental western façade, the central Basilica and the pavilion of the Patio de los Evangelistas (Court of the Evangelists), and modifying the construction techniques and roofing. Stylistically, he changed the image of the façades and introducing his personal sober style in accordance to the wishes of King Philip. The main keys of his design are the impressive horizontal unified composition and the use of bare granite, omitting the classical orders for large surfaces. This style introduced in the monastery influenced Spanish architecture for over a century, becoming known as the Herrerian style.

The Cathedral of Valladolid and the today Archivo General de Indias building were also designed by Herrera. He was the original designer for the Plaza Mayor in Madrid.

As instructed in his 1584 will, after his death, his sepulchre was transferred from Madrid to the Church of San Juan Bautista in Maliaño, Cantabria.

== Main works ==
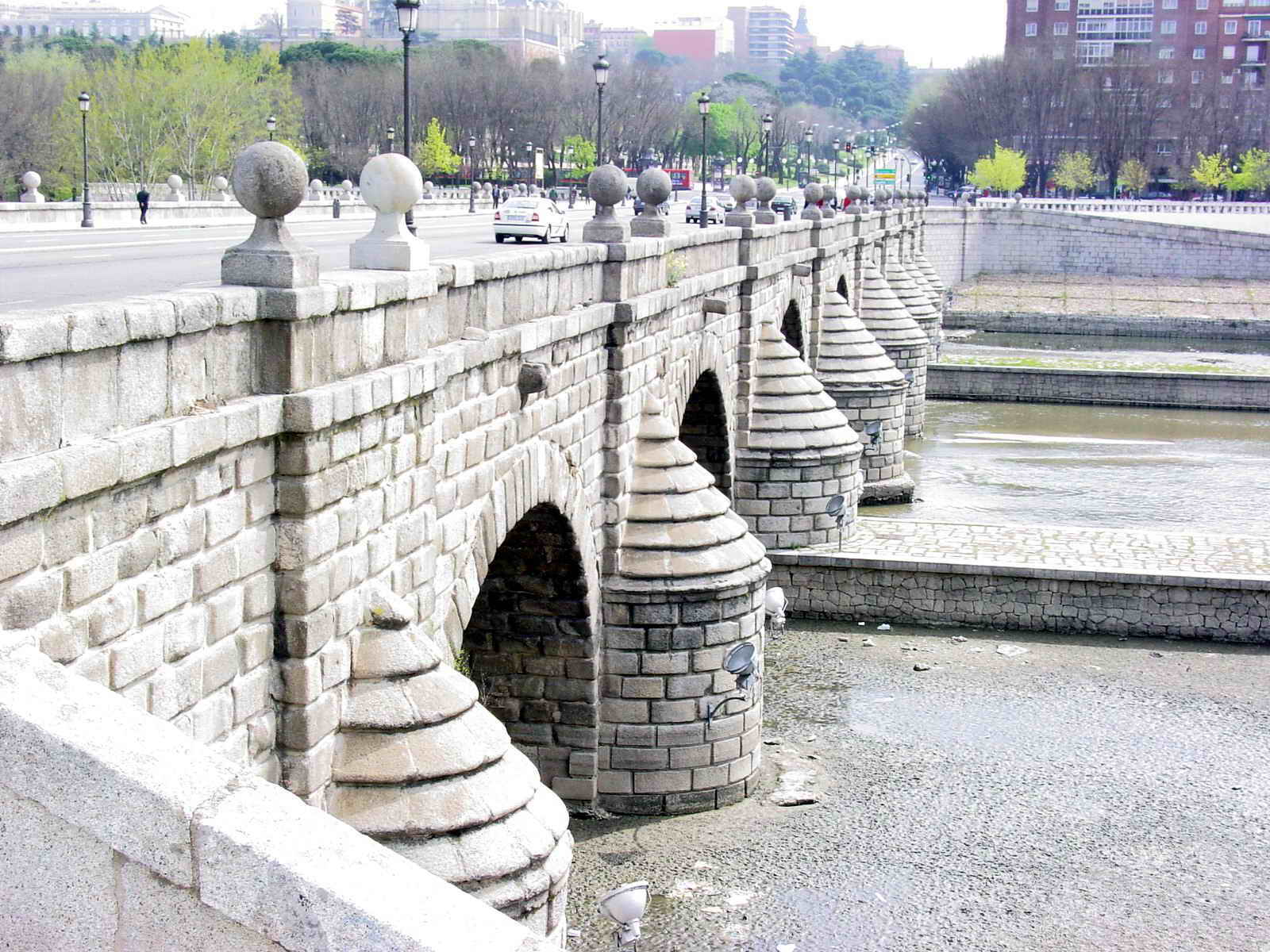
Segovia Bridge, in Madrid.

- Palacio Real de Aranjuez (1561)
- El Escorial (1563)
- Palace of El Quexigal (1563), building since disappeared, built in Robledo de Chavela (Madrid)
- South Façade of the Alcázar de Toledo (1571–1585)
- Casa Consistorial de Toledo (1575)
- Puente de Segovia in Madrid (1582–1584)
- Design of the Lonja de Sevilla, current Archivo de Indias (1583)
- Valladolid Cathedral (1589)
- Real Aposento de Torrelodones (1589), building since disappeared, built in Torrelodones.
- Puerta de Triana (1588) (demolished). One of the gates of the Walls of Seville.

== Gallery ==
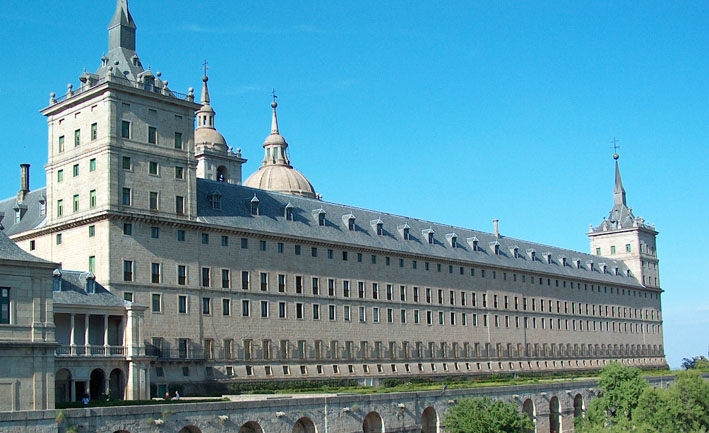
El Escorial, by Juan Bautista de Toledo and Juan de Herrera.

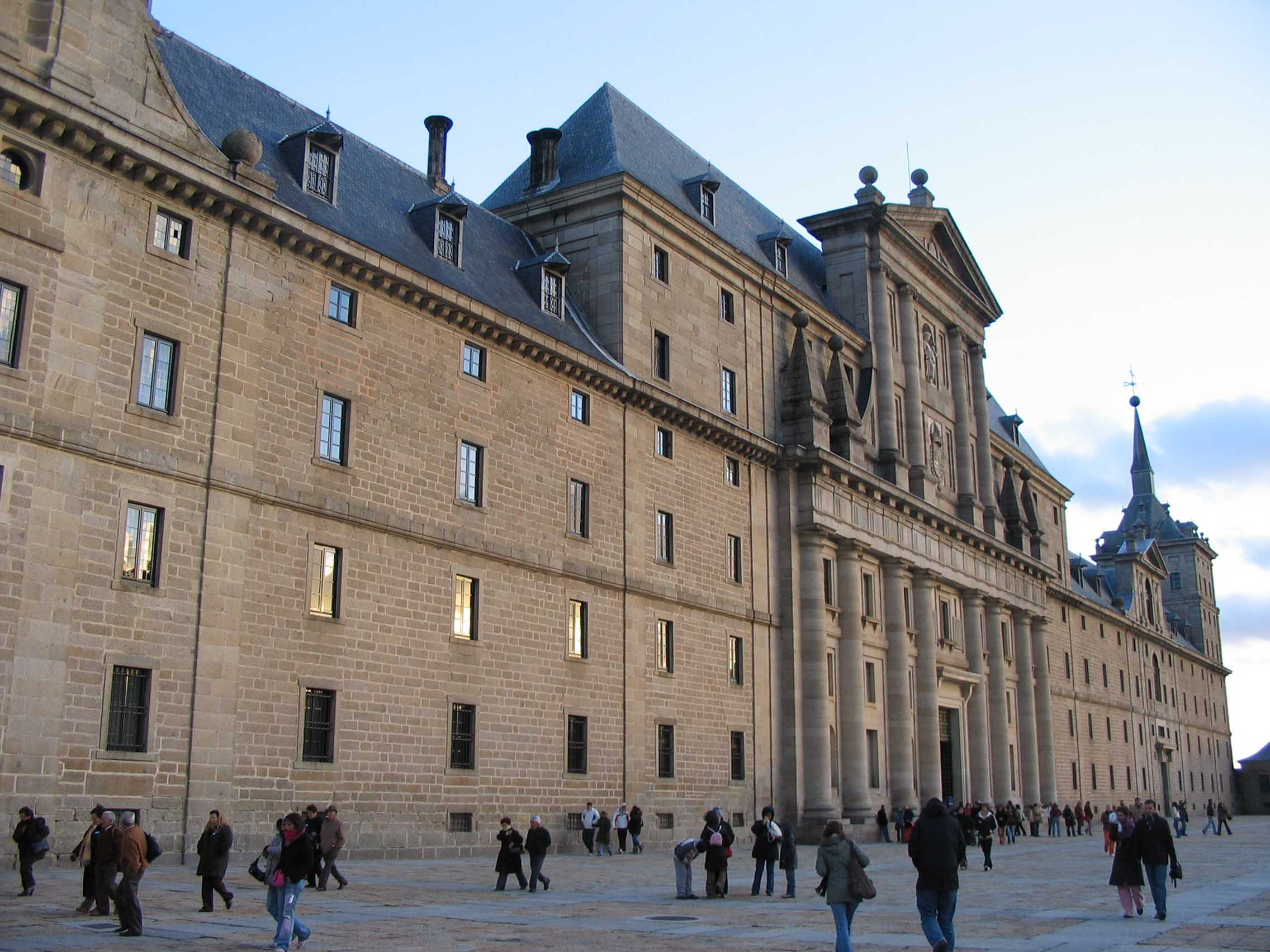
Façade of the Monastery of El Escorial

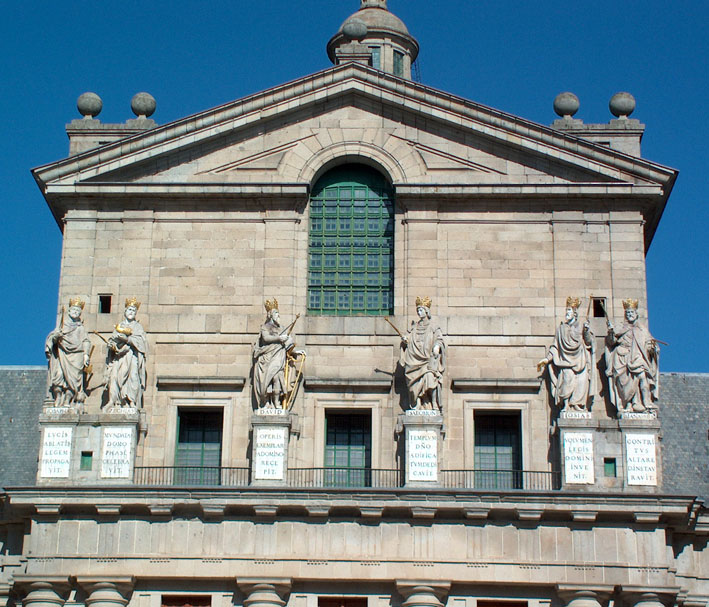
Detail of the Court of the Kings, in El Escorial.

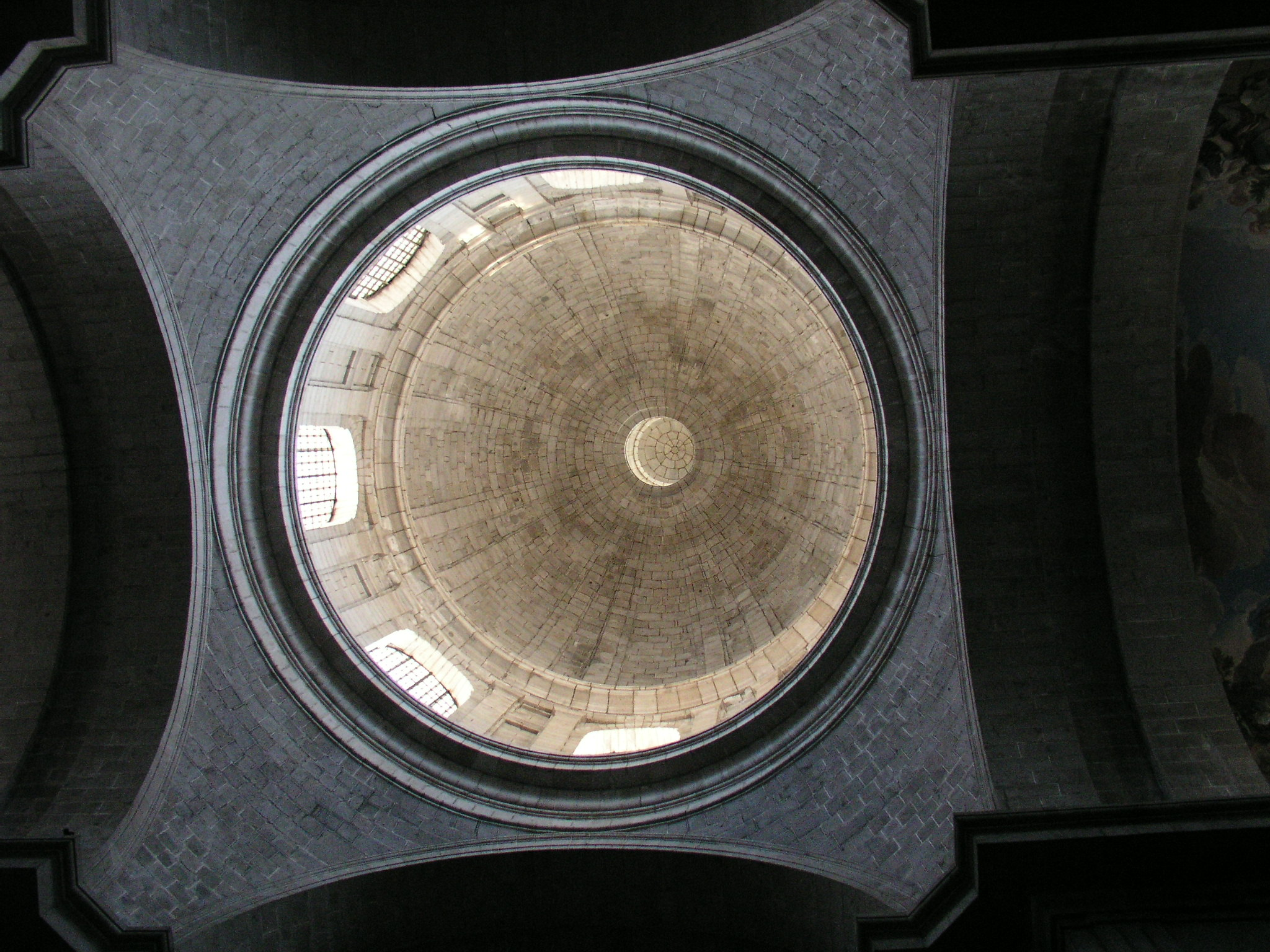
Dome of the Basilica of El Escorial

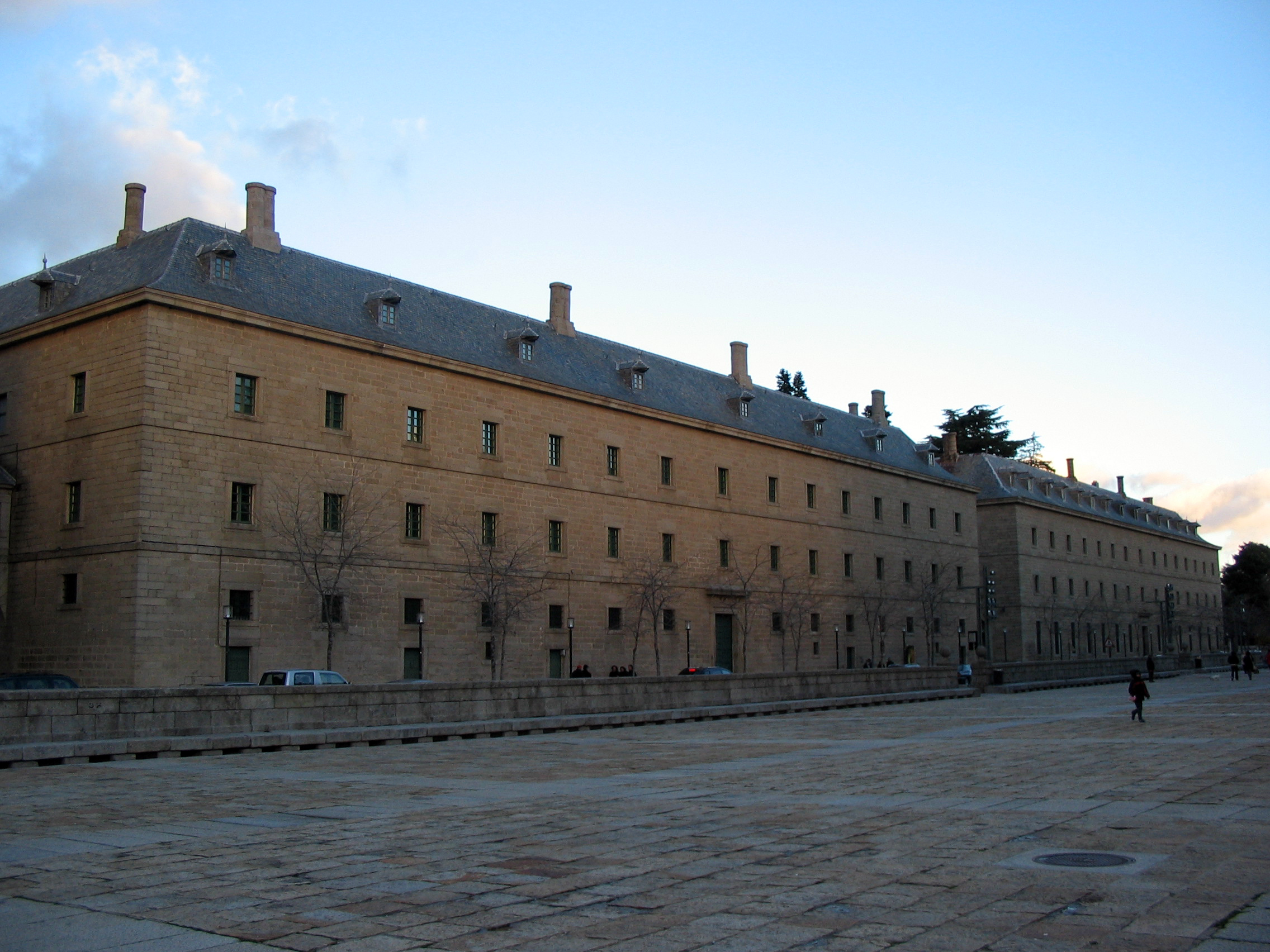
Houses in front of the Monastery of El Escorial.

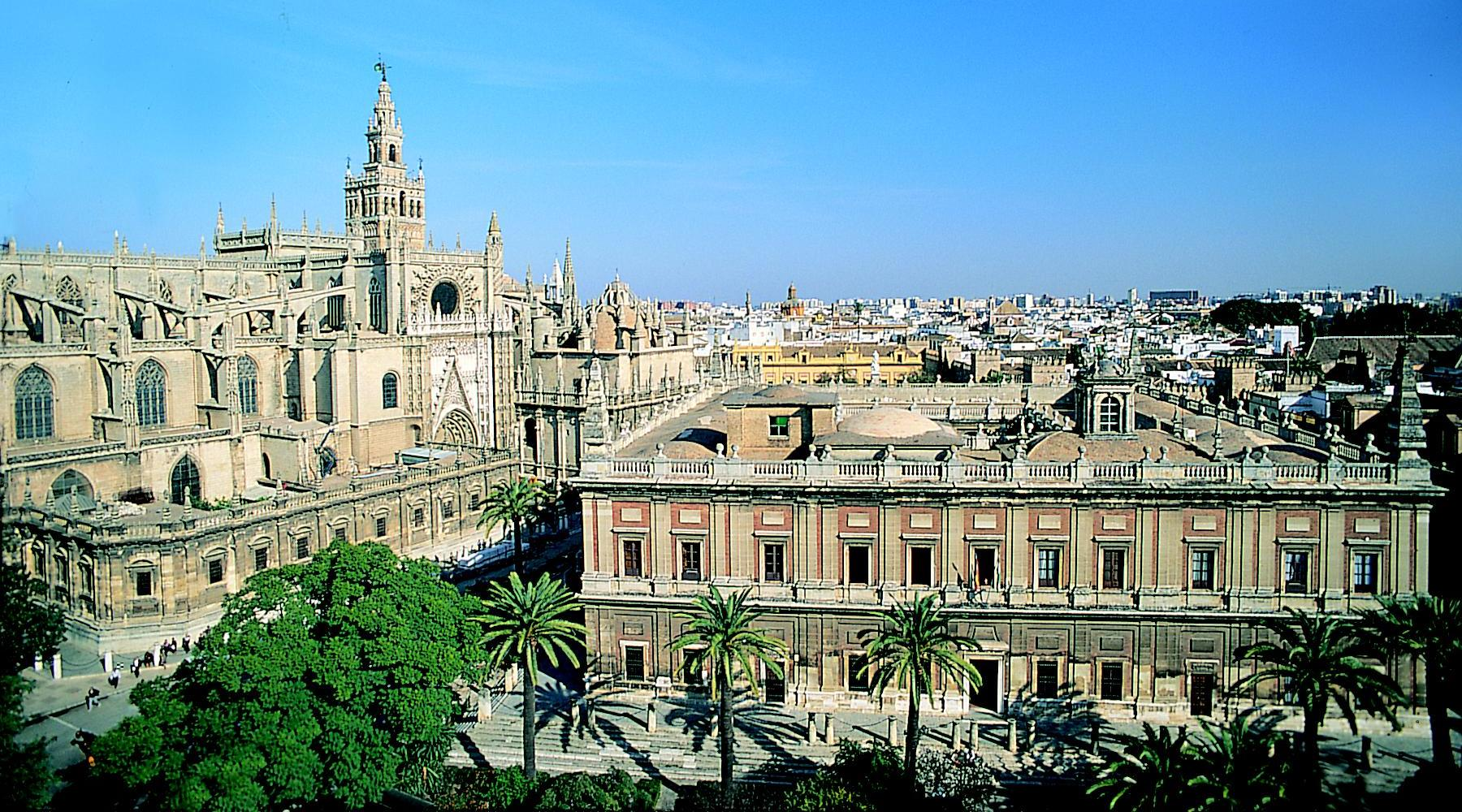
Archivo de Indias, Seville

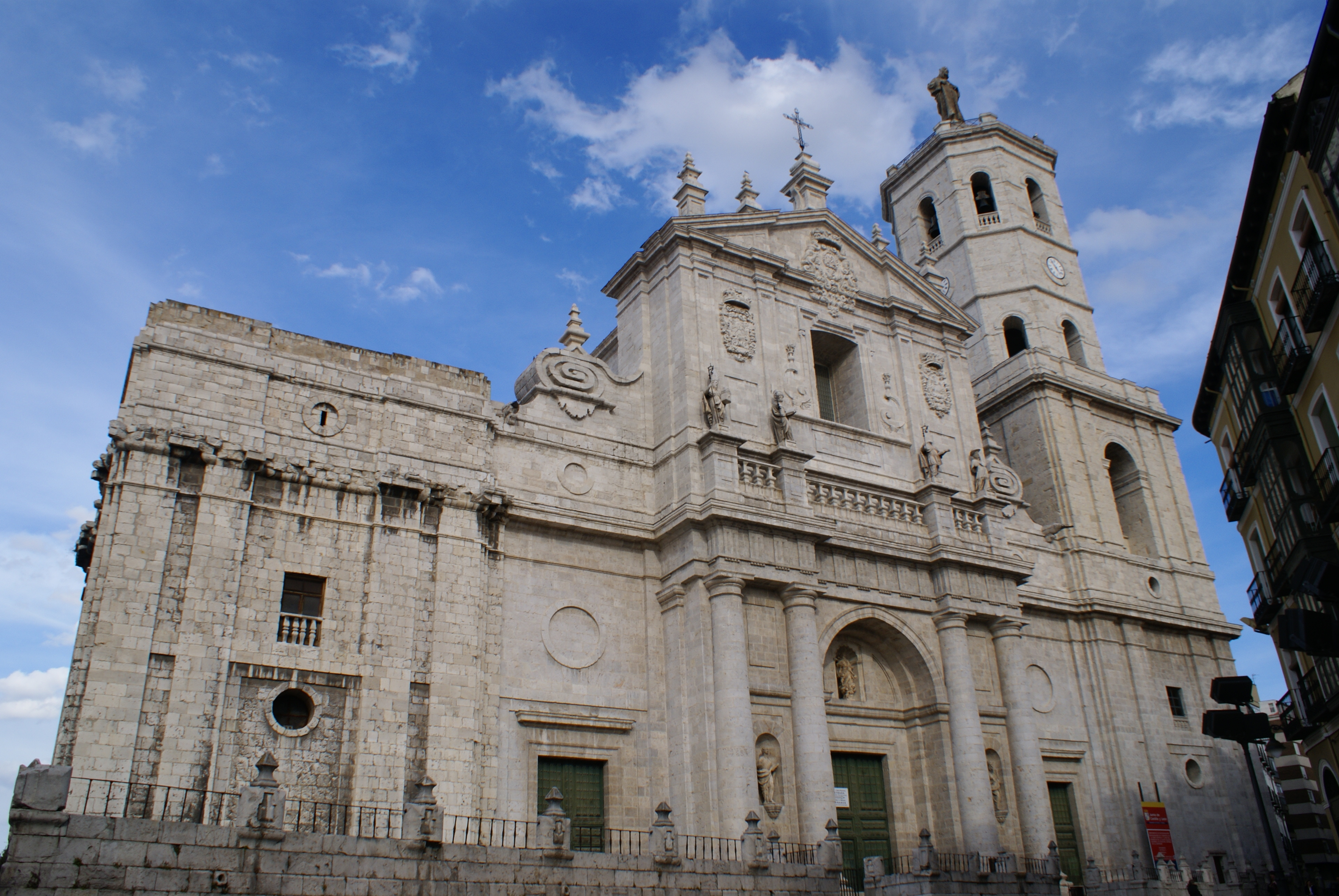
Valladolid Cathedral

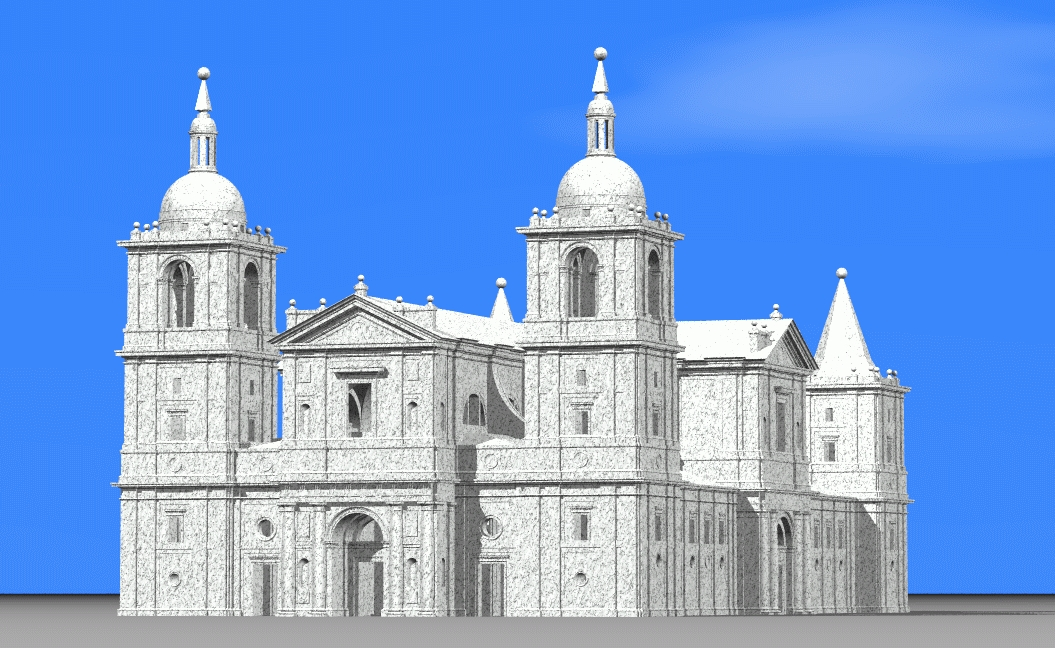
Model of the project of Herrera for the Cathedral of Valladolid.

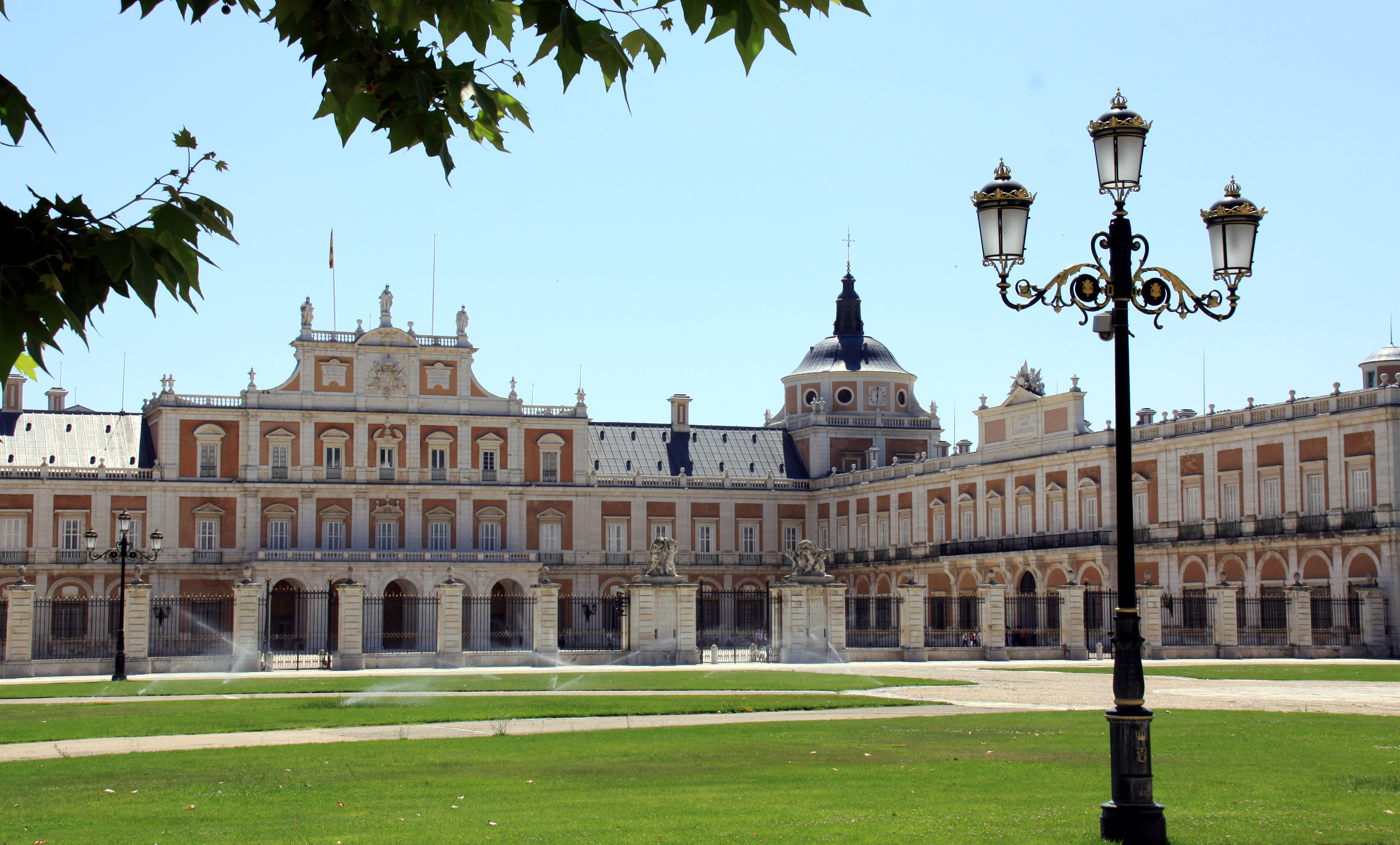
Royal Palace of Aranjuez

== See also ==
- Catedral de Valladolid
- Monasterio de El Escorial
- Palacio Real de Aranjuez
- Valdáliga
- Camargo, Cantabria
