= Fernán Blázquez de Cáceres =

Spanish nobleman

Fernán Blázquez de Cáceres was a Spanish nobleman.

== Life ==
Fernán Blázquez de Cáceres was a son of Juan Blázquez de Cáceres, el Gordo, already deceased in 1364. His father was a natural son of García Blázquez de Cáceres, younger brother of Blazco Múñoz de Cáceres, Founder and 1st Lord of the Majorat of the same name, by one Marina Pérez, paternal grandson of Blazco Múñoz de Cáceres, who died at 20 years of age and lived in Cáceres in 1270, married to Pascuala Pérez, daughter of Pascual Pérez and wife Menga Marín, and great-grandson of Juan Blázquez de Cáceres and wife Teresa Alfón.

He was the 2nd Lord of the Majorat de Blazco Múñoz, whose identity appears in a plea and sentence of May 23, 1364.

He was married to Juana González, and they had at least one son, Fernán Blázquez de Cáceres, who granted a will at Cáceres in 1443, married to Leonor Alfón de Ovando (seventh grandparents in male line of the conqueror of the castle of Brindis, Italian city and sea port in the Adriatic, formerly called Brundisium and currently Brindisi, Francisco José de Ovando y Solís Rol de La Cerda, 1st Marqués de Brindis, and his brother Alonso Pablo de Ovando y Solís Rol de La Cerda, 2nd Marqués de Brindis), the parents of Diego Fernández de Cáceres y Ovando.

== Sources ==
- Cunha, Fernando de Castro Pereira Mouzinho de Albuquerque e (1906–1998), Instrumentário Genealógico - Linhagens Milenárias. MCMXCV, p. 312-3
