= Nueva Cáceres (disambiguation) =

Nueva Cáceres may refer to the following:

- Ciudad de Nueva Cáceres - Former Philippine city during Spanish period that is now composed of Naga City, Canaman and Camaligan, Camarines Sur
- Archdiocese of Caceres
- University of Nueva Caceres
