= Alonso de Escobar y Cáceres =

Personal details
- Born: Trujillo, Extremadura, Spain
- Died: Asunción, Paraguay
- Occupation: Government
- Profession: Military

Alonso de Escobar y Cáceres was a Spanish military, Conquistador, Alcalde, Regidor and Lieutenant governor of Asunción and Buenos Aires in the 16th century.

== Biography ==
Born in Extremadura, was the son of Juan de Escobar. In 1555, the sergeant Escobar y Cáceres arrived to Paraguay, in the army of Juan de Sanabria. Alonso de Escobar y Cáceres had a natural son Alonso de Escobar (Regidor of Buenos Aires).
