= Jesús Blázquez =

Spanish historian, biographer and librarian

Jesús Alfonso Blázquez González (born Cebreros, Ávila, 1962) is a Spanish historian, biographer and librarian.

== Biography ==
Blázquez got his degree at the School of Geography and History at the Complutense University of Madrid, where he has also developed extensive doctoral work. He also holds a Master's Degree in Library Science and Documentation from the National Library of Spain. Blázquez has participated in several seminars and conferences in different countries: Spain, Austria, the United Kingdom and the United States.

Blazquez's career combines his professional work in the field of documentation with historical research and has published a number of articles. In this last field, he has devoted himself to studying the social history of Spanish literary circles from the Crisis of 1898 until the outbreak of civil conflict in 1936 during the past few years .

He is author of Miguel de Unamuno y Bernardo G. de Candamo: Amistad y Epistolario (1899-1936), this biography reconstructs the personal and literary relationship between the two figures, spanning nearly forty years. The work is divided into two distinct parts. In first place, it tells the story of the friendship through the biography of the least known of the two, Candamo, and its intersection with the life of Miguel de Unamuno. In second place, it is the transcript of the principal and most direct testimony of that friendship: the ninety-seven, mostly unpublished letters, that were exchanged over several decades.

== Works ==
- Miguel de Unamuno y Bernardo G. de Candamo: Amistad y Epistolario (1899-1936), Madrid: Ediciones 98, 2007
- "Sobre el nombre de Cebreros", Cuadernos abulenses, Nº. 26, 1997, pags. 195-230.
- "Un diálogo quebrado (Letras catalanas y castellanas)", El País, 28 de Marzo de 2009.
- "Bernardo G. de Candamo, escritor modernista miembro de la Generación del 98", Boletín de la Asociación de la Prensa de Madrid, number 67, March 2007.
- "Aplicaciones y usos de Internet en las Bibliotecas y Centros de Documentación ". Internet World'96, Madrid:AUI, 1996.
- "Bernardo G. de Candamo. Semblanza de un ateneista". Ateneistas Ilustres III, Madrid: Ateneo de Madrid, 2008.
- "Bernardo G. de Candamo". Diccionario Biográfico Español, Madrid: Real Academia de la Historia, Madrid, 2009.
- "Luis G. de Candamo". Diccionario Biográfico Español, Madrid: Real Academia de la Historia, Madrid, 2009.
- "Leandro Oroz". Diccionario Biográfico Español, Madrid: Real Academia de la Historia, Madrid, 2009.
- "Refugio Intelectual. ABC, Madrid, October 26, 2008.
