= Manuel Blázquez =

Spanish basketball player

Albacete Basket
- Position: Point guard / shooting guard
- League: Liga EBA

Personal information
- Born: March 22, 1989 (age 37) Albacete, Albacete, Spain
- Listed height: 6 ft 1 in (1.85 m)
- Listed weight: 172 lb (78 kg)

Career information
- NBA draft: 2008: undrafted
- Playing career: 2007–present

Career history
- ?: Escuelas Pías
- ?: CB Lucentum Alicante
- ?: Meridiano Santa Pola
- ?: Adesavi San Vicente
- ?: La Roda Caja Rural

Manuel José Blázquez López (born March 22, 1989, in Albacete, Castile-La Mancha, Spain), commonly known as Manolo Blázquez, is a Spanish basketball player who is best known for his time at the CB Lucentum Alicante of the Asociación de Clubs de Baloncesto (ACB).

He started to play in Escuelas Pías of Albacete. In 2005 he was signed by Alicante Costa Blanca to play in the junior team but in 2007 he began his professional career with Alicante Costa Blanca in the ACB league. Since 2008, he played for Liga EBA (4th division) teams as Meridiano Santa Pola, Adesavi San Vicente and La Roda Caja Rural, until he signed, in 2013, for Albacete Basket, returning to his native city.

In 2014, he started studying to become sports teacher in Alicante.
