= Daniel Bravo Silva =

Chilean politician

Daniel Bravo
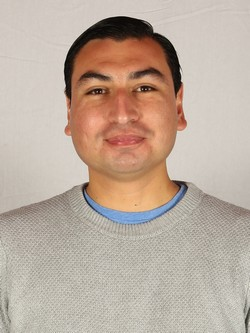

Member of the Constitutional Convention
- In office 4 July 2021 – 4 July 2022
- Constituency: 5th District

Personal details
- Born: 17 May 1982 (age 44) La Serena, Chile
- Other political affiliations: The List of the People (2021–2022)
- Education: Catholic University of the North (LL.B); Pontifical Catholic University of Valparaíso (LL.M)
- Occupation: Scholar
- Profession: Lawyer

Daniel Bravo Silva (born 17 April 1982) is a Chilean lawyer, academic, and independent politician.

He served as a member of the Constitutional Convention from 2021 to 2022, representing the 5th District of the Coquimbo Region, and coordinated the Convention’s Rules and Harmonization commissions.

== Early life ==
Bravo was born on 17 April 1982 in La Serena, Chile. He is the son of Ricardo Bravo Marchant and Carmen Silva Tapia.

== Education ==
He completed his secondary education at Colegio Gerónimo Rendic in La Serena, graduating in 1999. He studied law at the Catholic University of the North, Coquimbo campus, where he earned a degree in Legal and Social Sciences. He was admitted to the Chilean Bar by the Supreme Court on 23 July 2007.

He later obtained a Master’s degree in Civil Law from the Pontifical Catholic University of Valparaíso, and completed several postgraduate diplomas in law. He has pursued further graduate studies in Family and Child Law at the University of Barcelona.

== Professional career ==
Bravo has practiced law primarily in civil and family law matters and is a partner at the law firm BS & Asociados. He has served as a partition judge (juez partidor) registered with the Court of Appeals of La Serena for the 2017–2018 and 2019–2020 terms.

He has worked as a lecturer in Civil Law at the Central University of Chile, La Serena campus, since 2016, and previously taught at the School of Law of the Catholic University of the North, Coquimbo campus, between 2007 and 2020.

== Political and public activity ==
Bravo has carried out socio-legal advisory and educational work with neighborhood associations, senior citizens’ clubs, informal settlements in Coquimbo, and migrant communities in La Serena and Coquimbo.

Following the 2019 social unrest, he joined the Movimiento Independientes del Norte (MIN), contributing to the formation of an independent platform for constitutional candidates from northern Chile.

In the elections held on 15–16 May 2021, he ran as an independent candidate for the Constitutional Convention representing the 5th District of the Coquimbo Region, affiliated with the Movimiento Territorial Constituyente within the Lista del Pueblo, with support from the Movimiento Independientes del Norte. He was elected with 11,061 votes, corresponding to 4.91% of the valid votes cast.

During his tenure in the Convention, he served as coordinator of both the Rules Commission and the Harmonization Commission.
