= Daniel Cáceres =

Paraguayan footballer (born 1982)

Daniel Gabriel Cáceres Silva
- Born: April 3, 1982 (age 44); Asunción, Paraguay
- Occupation: football Midfielder

Daniel Cáceres Silva (born April 3, 1982) is a Paraguayan association football Midfielder currently playing for Barracas Central of the Primera B Metropolitana in Argentina.

== Teams ==
- (Argentina) San Lorenzo (Inferiors) 2000-2001
- (Argentina) Almagro 2001-2002
- (Argentina) San Lorenzo 2003
- (Argentina) Deportivo Morón 2003-2004
- (Argentina) Deportivo Laferrere 2004–2006
- (Argentina) Barracas Central 2006–present
