= Juan Blázquez de Cáceres =

Spanish soldier and nobleman

- Born: Ávila, Spain
- Spouse: Teresa Alfón
- Children: Blazco Múñoz de Cáceres, García Blázquez de Cáceres
- Military career
- Conflicts: Conquest of Cáceres (1229)

Juan Blázquez de Cáceres, the Conqueror of Cáceres, was a Spanish soldier and nobleman.

== Life ==
Juan Blázquez de Cáceres was born in Ávila and was at the Conquest of Cáceres, on 23 April 1229, from which he took his surname.

He was married to Teresa Alfón and had at least one son, Blazco Múñoz de Cáceres, who died at 90 years and lived in Cáceres in 1270, married to Pascuala Pérez, daughter of Pascual Pérez and wife Menga Marín, parents of Blazco Múñoz de Cáceres, Founder and 1st Lord of the Majorat of the same name, and García Blázquez de Cáceres, who by one Marina Pérez had Fernán Blázquez de Cáceres, 2nd Lord of the Majorat de Blazco Múñoz. They were the ancestors of the Marqueses de Alcántara (de Villavicencio del Cuervo, 13 May 1667).

== Sources ==
- Cunha, Fernando de Castro Pereira Mouzinho de Albuquerque e (1906–1998), Instrumentário Genealógico - Linhagens Milenárias. MCMXCV, p. 312-3
- Instituto de Salazar y Castro, Elenco de Grandezas y Titulos Nobiliarios Españoles. Various (periodic publication)
