= Pablo Montesino Cáceres =

Spanish academic (1781–1849)

Pedro Pablo Montesino y Cáceres (1781–1849) was a Spanish teacher and academic.

== Education and career ==
Pedro Pablo Montesino y Cáceres was born in Fuente el Carnero in 1781. Montesino studied in Valladolid and later got his medical degree in Salamanca. He also served in the military.

Montesino was a man of liberal and progressive interests and as a result was exiled in London for 10 years (1823-1833).

He carried out the first implementation of the liberal education system and generalized many ideas proposed by other prominent teachers. He was the first principal of the Escuelas Normales, and his ideas were widely circulate. He focused on early childhood education, having observed the educational situation in London, and also set about proper teacher training.

When he returned to Spain he established the Sociedad para mejorar la educación del pueblo (Society for improving the education of the people), and following this he founded the first kindergarten school in 1838 in Madrid. He later created another such school that would bear his name. In 1839, he took part in the primary education reform, proposing the adoption of kindergarten schools and improved female education. One of his best known works was Manual para maestros de la escuela de Párvulos in 1840 (Handbook for kindergarten teachers). This work included all his educational ideas, and was the first theoretical framework introduced in Spain.

== Accomplishments ==
From 1836, with the Duke of Rivas's Plan de Instrucción Pública (Plan of Public Instruction), the then newly formed liberal bourgeois government began to take steps to set up an educational model that suited their economic, ideological and political interests, following the basic tenets of the bourgeois liberal pedagogy. The main objective of this action was the construction of a national education system as was done in other European countries. For social and educational reasons, it was also necessary to meet the educational needs of younger children, through the establishment of kindergartens. For this purpose it was necessary to provide adequate training for teachers in special schools. The proper functioning of the system also required the creation of an inspectorate that would supervise, guide and advise teachers, while providing the necessary information to the government. Pablo Montesino played a key role in designing the programmes and the processes of implementation of the actions undertaken to achieve these ends.

One of Montesino' greatest accomplishments throughout his career was his work in the Escuelas Normales. The Escuelas Normales emerged in Spain in the forties and were primarily concerned with teacher training. In 1843 he delineated what teachers were to become and accordingly reorganized the Escuelas Normales. Many of these centers experienced an initial period of uncertainty during which they would not function as Escuelas Normales except in name only. For Montesino there were only two ways to create high caliber teachers: either improve teacher quality through the creation of Escuelas Normales or impose an obligation to provide them with good training. Montesino considered the first option to be superior.
