= Majorat =

French property inheritance arrangement

Majorat (French: [maʒɔʁa]) is an arrangement giving the right of succession to a specific parcel of property associated with a title of nobility to a single heir, based on male primogeniture. A majorat (fideicommis) would be inherited by the oldest son, or if there was no son, the nearest male relative. This law existed in some European countries and was designed to prevent the distribution of wealthy estates between many members of the family, thus weakening their position. Majorats were one of the factors facilitating the evolution of aristocracy.

The term is not used to refer to inheritances in England, where the practice was the norm, in the form of entails (also known as fee tails).

== France ==
Majorats were explicitly regulated by French law. In France, it was a title to property, landed or funded, attached to a title instituted by Napoleon I and abolished in 1848.

In many cases, the title could not be inherited if the property attached to it did not pass to the same person. Like English entails, the consequences of majorats were often used in fiction to add complexity to plots; Honoré de Balzac was especially interested in them.

== Polish-Lithuanian Commonwealth ==
In the Polish–Lithuanian Commonwealth, majorat was known as ordynacja and was introduced in late 16th century by King Stephen Báthory. A couple of Polish magnates' fortunes were based on ordynacja: namely those of the Radziwiłłs, Zamoyskis, Wielopolskis. Ordynacja was abolished by the institution of agricultural reform in the People's Republic of Poland.

== Portugal ==
In Portugal, there was a similar arrangement called a morgadio, the holder of which was denominated the morgado (or morgada if female). Each morgadio was established by a specific deed on the basis of an indivisible estate and included rules of succession. In many cases, one of the requirements for inheritance was that the heir must take the family name—-and occasionally the coat of arms—-of the founder of the morgadio. Both men and women could institute and inherit one, although in most cases succession was preferentially by male primogeniture. In some families many morgadios were accumulated as a result of marriage alliances, leading to a tradition of very long family names among the Portuguese nobility. Morgadios were abolished in 1863.

== Spain ==
In Spain the practice was known as mayorazgo, and was a part of the Castilian law from 1505 (Leyes de Toro) to 1820. Basque majorats could be inherited by the oldest male or female child.

== Russian Empire ==
In the Russian Empire, a similar arrangement was introduced by Peter the Great in his 1714 Decree on Single Inheritance, in relation to the inheritance of the real estate, under the influence of the European concept of "Majorat"..

== See also ==
- Minorat – same as majorat, only inheritance passed to the youngest child
- Fee tail - similar but different concept in common law
