= Francisco de Mora =

Spanish architect

Francisco de Mora (c.1553–1610) was a Spanish Renaissance architect.

== Life ==
Mora was born in Cuenca, and baptized in the parish of Santa Cruz on August 15, 1552. He was an uncle of the humanist Baltasar Porreño. His father having died, Francisco was apprenticed at the age of thirteen to Pedro de Villadiego, a carpenter and carver. Villadiego was at that time engaged in carving an altarpiece for Monteagudo de las Salinas.

In 1579 took service with architect Juan de Herrera, along with Herrera's nephew, Pedro Liermo. He worked with Herrera on the construction of the Alcázar of Segovia. In 1587, he completed the main garden and the School of Honor areas of the castle. Mora also worked with Herrera on the Monastery of San Lorenzo in El Escorial. His industriousness and great technical expertise in the royal works where he had collaborated was rewarded by Philip II with the appointment May 11, 1587 to work on the church of the Monastery of Uclés. The west facade was planned by Mora, but not built by him. It contains the front entrance of the church.

Herrera being indisposed, in June 1588, Mora went to Simancas and designed the patio, doorway and the main staircase of the expanded fortress where the king wished to move the royal archives. He then designed the chapter house for the Hieronymites at Lupiana. The charterhouse at Évora has also been attributed to him. On June 7, 1591, the king signed his appointment as master builder for the renovations at the Royal Alcázar of Madrid. In 1594, he designed the Church of St. Barnabas in El Escorial, Madrid to replace an older church on the same site.

In July 1595, the Madrid city council commissioned Mora to design improvements to the conditions of the classrooms of the Theatines. That same year he provided the city designs for an orphanage. Mora used to draw the altarpieces of the churches that were made under his direction. He designed the Doña María de Aragón Altarpiece painted by El Greco in 1596.

Upon the death of his brother-in-law in 1597, court painter Juan Gomez, Mora took charge of the education and training of his nephew Juan Gómez de Mora, who would later oversee the construction of a number of buildings designed by his uncle Francisco. On August 13, 1598, the Royal Council sent the King for approval a design by Mora for the façade of the convent of Santo Domingo in Valencia, which the Marquis of Denia had requested, according to which the work was built. In 1599 he was commissioned by the royal Council to design three monumental arches for the formal entry of Queen Margaret, newly married to King Philip III.

Herrera's approach was characterized by geometric simplicity and an almost absence of decoration. Mora is considered one of the best representatives of Herrerian architecture, a style that developed in the last third of the 16th century, although his best work also anticipates the Baroque currents that would dominate 17th-century architecture. His style was originally sober, devoid of ornamentation, geometric, symmetrical and with large open spaces.

He was the designer of the Convento de San José (Ávila). The design was one of the most imitated in the religious buildings of the seventeenth century and was adopted as a model for Discalced Carmelite construction. The Palacio ducal de Lerma (Lerma, Burgos) is considered de Mora's masterwork, and had a major influence on later religious and secular architecture. He also designed the Palacio de los Concejos in Madrid.

When the court moved to Valladolid in 1601, Mora was busy renovating buildings to accommodate their expanded use. After a fire in 1604 completely destroyed the interior of the Royal Palace of El Pardo, Phillip III entrusted the rebuilding of the palace to Francisco de Mora.

Francisco de Mora died in Madrid.
