= Colegio Nuestra Senora de la Antigua =

School in Lugo, Spain

Coordinates: 42.51831°N 7.51696°W

School Nuestra Senora de la Antigua is a school in Lugo, Spain, built in 1523 by the Cardinal of Seville, Don Rodrigo de Castro. The school was first managed by the Society of Jesus and later passed on to the Piarists Fathers during the nineteenth century. The school building is one of the few Herrerian style buildings in Galicia, and widely known due to its magnificent structure, which has a main building, a church, and a museum. Nowadays the school continues to impart classes from kindergarten to High School.

== History ==
=== Foundation ===
The school was founded in 1523 by the Cardinal of Seville, Don Rodrigo de Castro, son of Countess Beatriz de Castro and Count Don Alvaro de Osorio. The school is located in Monforte de Lemos, in the north region of Spain, in the city of Lugo, Galicia.

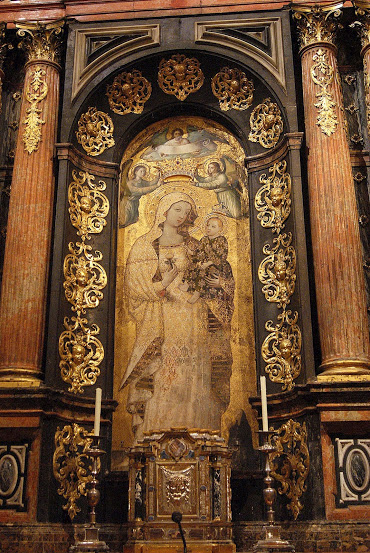
Representation of Virge n de la Antigua in the Cathedral of Seville, Spain

=== First Years ===
During the first years, the school was managed by the Society of Jesus, in which the Cardinal was highly involved, providing financial support and management supervision to other Jesuit schools in the south of Spain: School of Jerez de la Frontera and Seminary School of the British Jesuits.

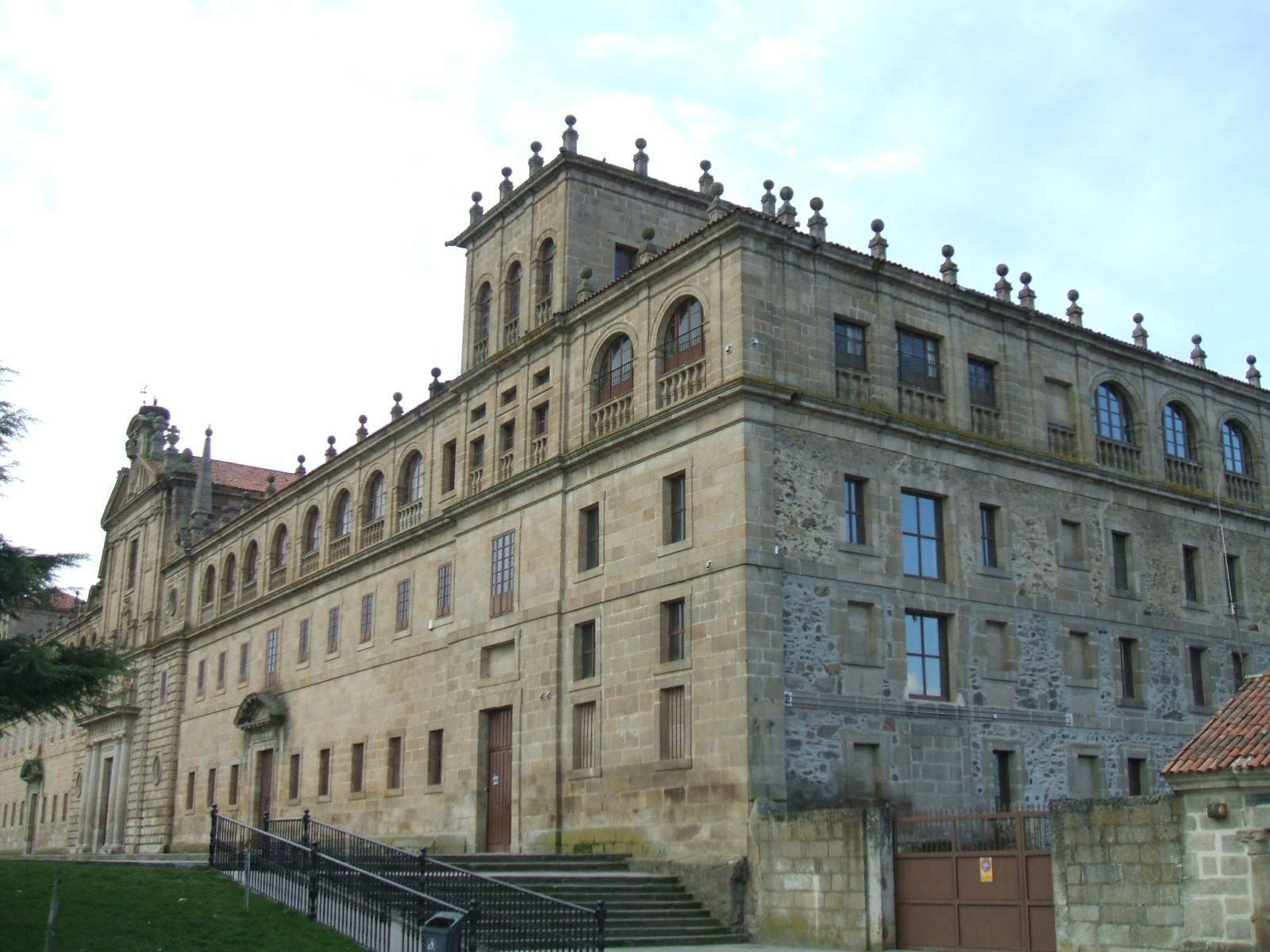
Colegio Nuestra Senora de la Antigua

The school is considered the biggest legacy of the Cardinal in Monforte de Lemos, and one of the few buildings built in the Herrerian style in Galicia, Spain. The name of the school, Colegio Nuestra Senora de la Antigua, emerges from the great devotion the Cardinal had to the Antigua Virgin, one of the multiple representations of Virgin Mary.

=== 1767-1873 ===
In 1767, the 11 Jesuits residing in the school were driven out by Spanish King Carlos III, and forced to abandon the school leaving all their objects and personal belongings. After the Jesuits were expelled form the School, the King ordered to erase all signs of the Jesuits Society from the school shield and symbols. Since this moment until 1873, the school was served for multiple purposes, from the Real Seminar, School of Humanities and Fine Arts and Province Institute of Lugo.

After this period of time, the building was left in ruins, having to be closed because it was completely uninhabitable.

=== 1873 ===
In 1873, Duke of Alba, takes control of the School and ordered the Piarists Fathers to restore and mend the building and start again to impart classes. In November 1873, the Piarists Fathers started to impart classes to a promotion of 153 students, but it didn't last long before the Piarists Fathers tried to escape the city due to defaults from the Duke and the Mayor.

=== Contemporary ===
Nowadays the school is still managed by the Piarists Fathers, after 141 years. The school offers kindergarten, primary and secondary education, offering a study exchange program with United Kingdom and France.

== Geography ==
Lugo, is a province situated in the northwest of Spain, in the autonomous province of Galicia. The municipality has a population of 98,134 in 2015, making it the most populated province of Galicia.

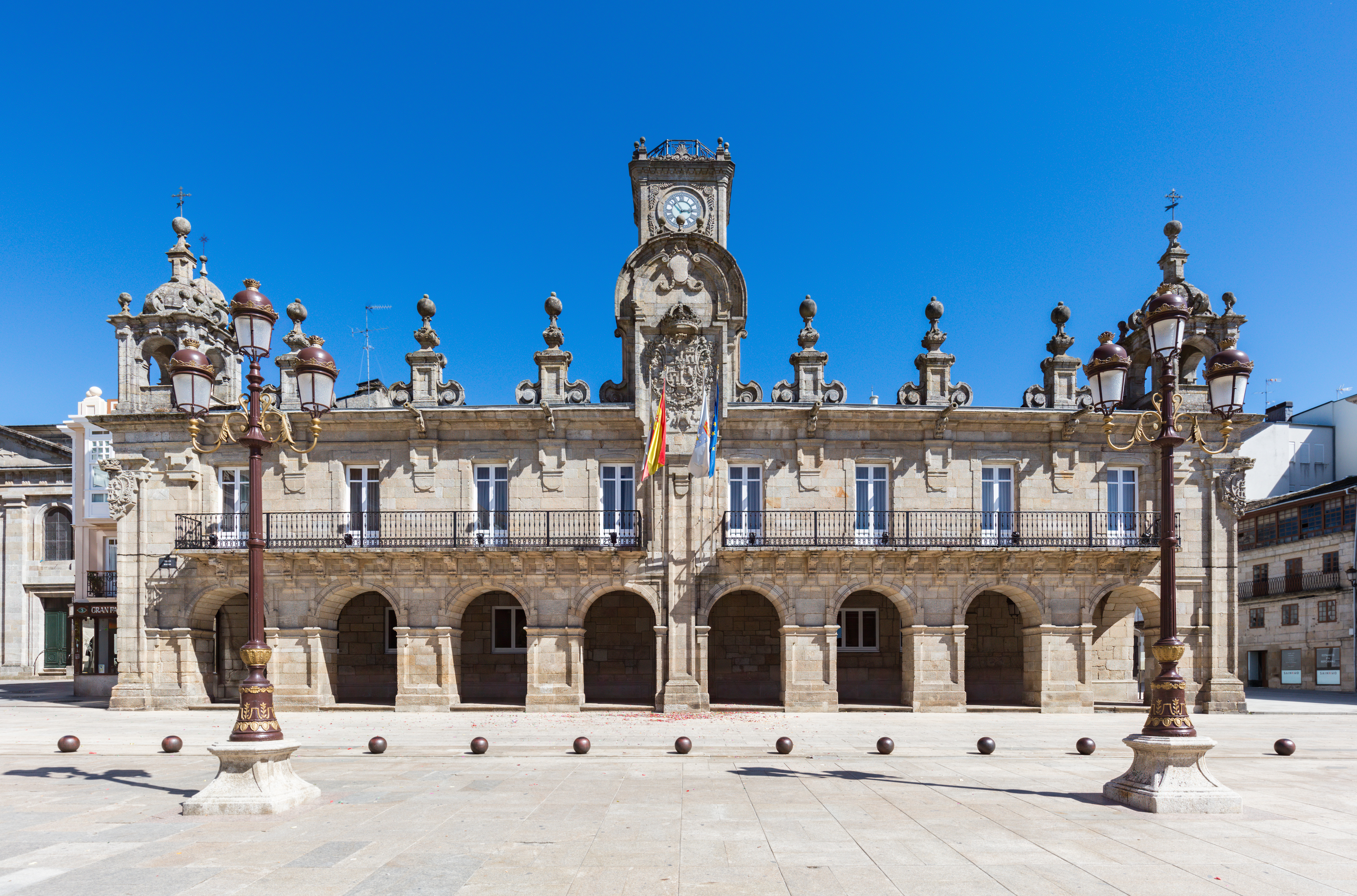
City Hall, Lugo, Galicia

Lugo is the only city in the world to be surrounded by completely intact Roman walls, which reach a height of 10 to 15 meters (33 to 49 ft) along a 2,117-metre (6,946 ft) circuit ringed with 71 towers. The walk along the top is continuous round the circuit, and features ten gates. These 3rd century walls are protected by UNESCO as a World Heritage Site. The bridge over the Minho is essentially of Roman date, though many repairs over the centuries have effaced its Roman character.

== Infrastructure ==
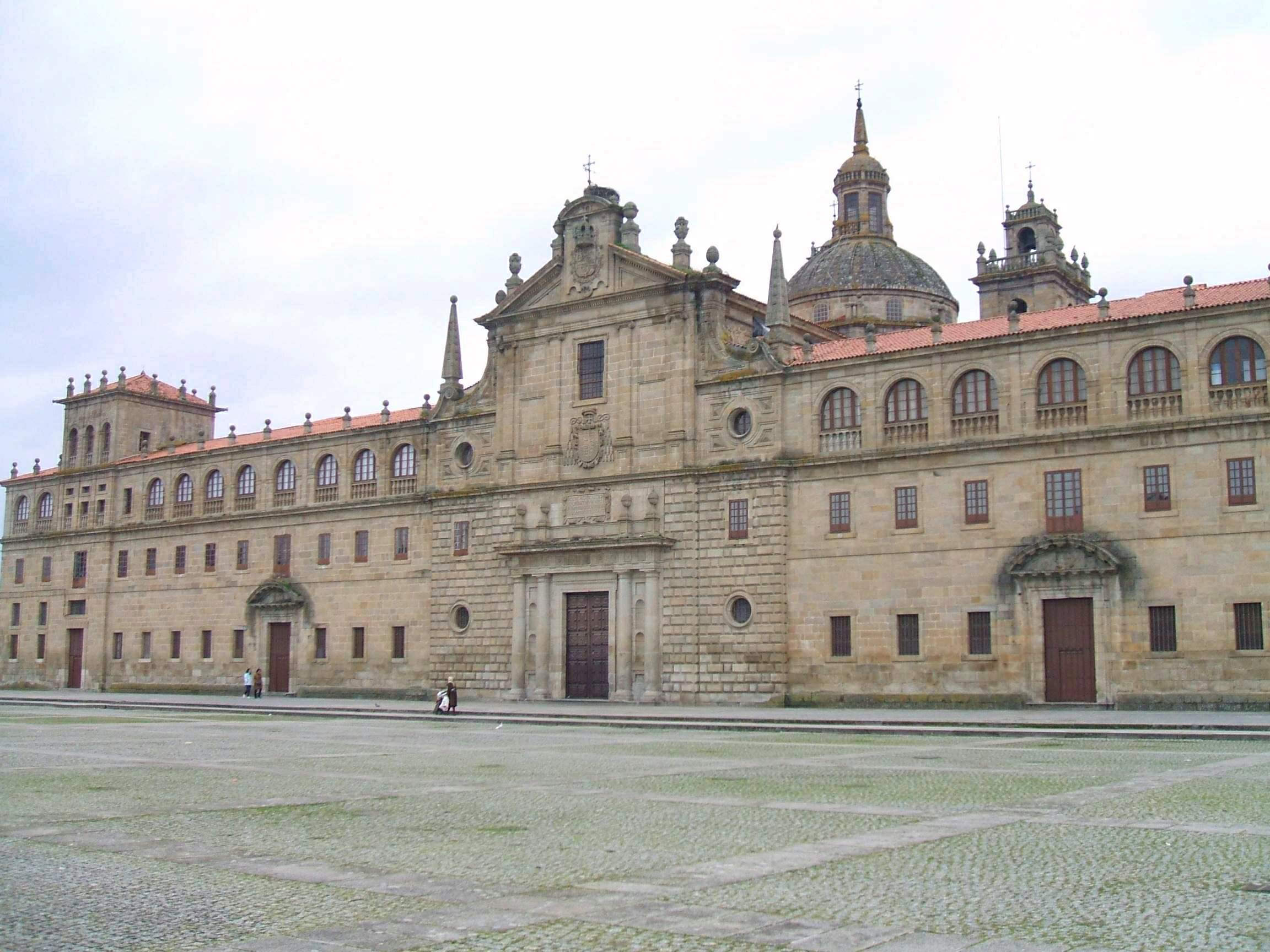
View of the School Nuestra Senora de la Antigua from the Outside

=== Main Building ===
The building was built in the Herrerian style, which falls into the Renaissance art. Due to the size and grandiosity of the building, it received the name "El Escorial de Galicia". The building is 23 meters high and 110 meters long, and is distributed in total symmetry.

The whole building was built with Spanish granite, which turns into gold color with the pass of time. In the middle of the structure a portico was built, as the entrance of the church that was built in the building. The portico is divided in two different parts. The superior part, built on an Ionian style and the inferior part, built on a Doric style.

=== Great Escalator ===
Built by Pedro Marlote and Juan de la Sierra between 1594 and 1603, the great escalator is characterized for its 3 meters wide and its one piece steps. The structure was made with such a strong granite, that the state of it is almost perfect after centuries of used. One of the main characteristics that make this escalator unique is the way it was built. The escalator has no central support, resting on the side walls of the building. Under the escalator, in the arcade, there are still rests of the map, the architects draw as a reference to build the escalator.

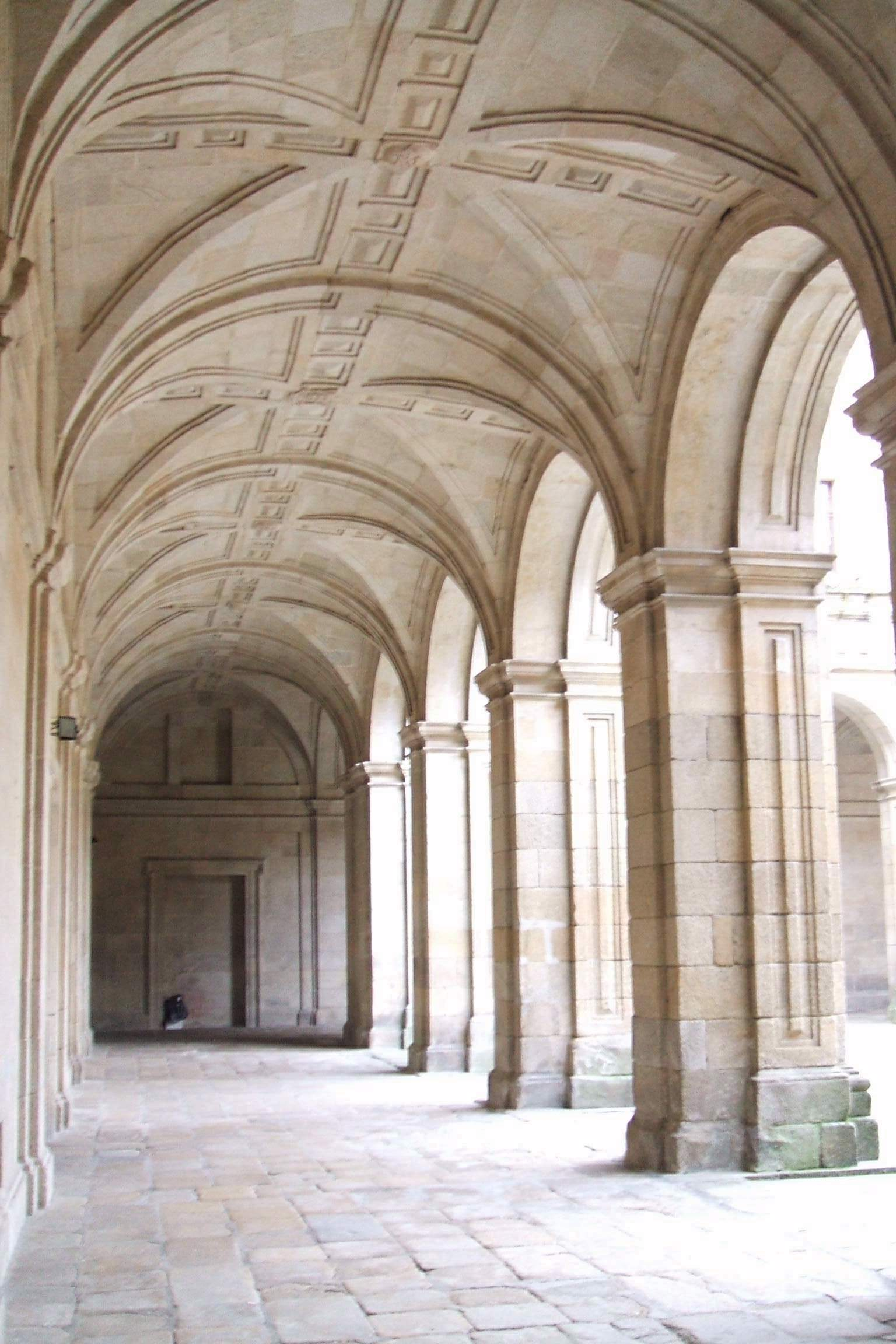
Cloister, Nuestra Senora de la Antigua School in Lugo, Spain

=== Cloister ===
The cloister was built on a Doric-Romanic style with 22 meters of length from side to side. The cloister is supported by heavy pillars of one and a half meters high and surrounds a yard, covered with groined vaults and rosettes that fall between the ribs intersections. In the top-middle of each pillar four different shields represent the different contributors to the building: the first shield represents the Cardinal Rodrigo de Castro; the second one refers to Casa de Lemos; the third one belongs to the Casa de Alba; and the last one stand for Escuelas Pias, representing the contribution of the Piarists Fathers.

The shield representing the Piarist Fathers was decided to include it in along with the others, because they were the ones that finished the building between 1919 and 1926.

=== Church ===
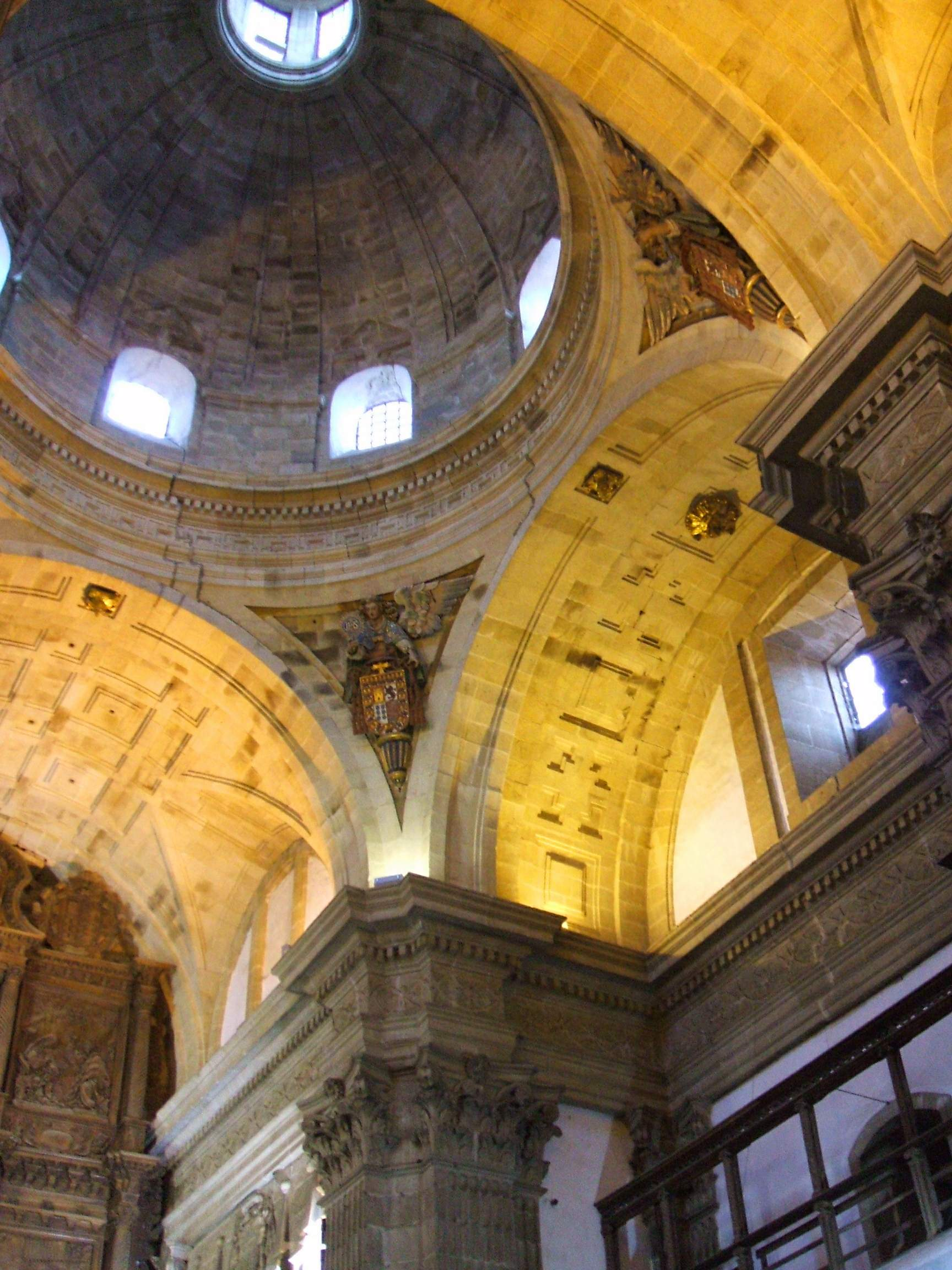
The church from the inside

The church was built on a Jesuitical style, inspired by the Gesu de Roma, mother church of the Jesuits. The building was built on a Latin-cross plant with short arms. The central vessel has a barrel vault resting on an ionian entablature, which is decorated with a geometric and simple border.

The church is open to the public, offering mass sessions everyday of the year. During working days the church offers one session at 11:00AM and during holidays it has three different sessions: 9:30AM, 11:00AM and 12:30AM.

=== The Museum ===
The school has a small museum situated in the old sacristy of the church. The museum houses paintings from important Spanish artists such as El Greco, the author of two of the most relevant pieces found in the walls of the sacristy: La Aparicion de la Virgen con el nino a San Lorenzo and Fray Leon meditando sobre la muerte. Among other paintings, there are five pieces from Andrea del Sarto, all of them representations of different saints: San Pedro, San Juan Buatista, Santa Ines, Santa Margarita and Santa Catalina.

We can also find two oil paintings each of them representing the Doomsday and the Death, and a portrait of the Cardinal by Francisco Pacheco. On both sides of the room there are glass cabinets which contain objects that belong to the Cardinal.

== Education ==
Nowadays the school offers an educational program divided in three different stages: kindergarten (3 to 6 years old), Primary school (6 to 11 years old) and Secondary school (11 to 14 years old). The school offers a bilingual educational program, with both Spanish and English classes from kindergarten to secondary school. Both students and parents have access to an online platform, where students can find their assignments, exams calendar, grades etc.

=== Religion ===
The school education is based on the catholic religion, imparting religion classes every week and attending mass once a week.

=== Sports and other activities ===
The school offers a wide range of activities: volleyball, basketball, judo, athletics, swimming classes and chess. The volleyball team is formed only by girls and compete in the regional volleyball league every year. Basketball, judo and athletics are also imparted every week in the school. The swimming classes are imparted for both boys and girls once a week in the city public pool, where the children travel with the school bus and the school professors. The chess club, normally formed by no more than 10 to 20 students also participates in tournaments with other regional schools.

Other activities such as day trips to the countryside and the beach, spelling bee tournaments, talent shows etc. are also provided by the school to the students.

=== Summer School ===
The school also offers a summer program called Villacarriedo Summer School. The program is for both girls and boys from 8 to 14 years old. The main point is to improve the English level of the kids and entertain them with other fun activities. The summer camp takes place in Cantabria, Spain.

== See also ==
- List of Jesuit sites
