= Cross-window =

Type of architectural feature

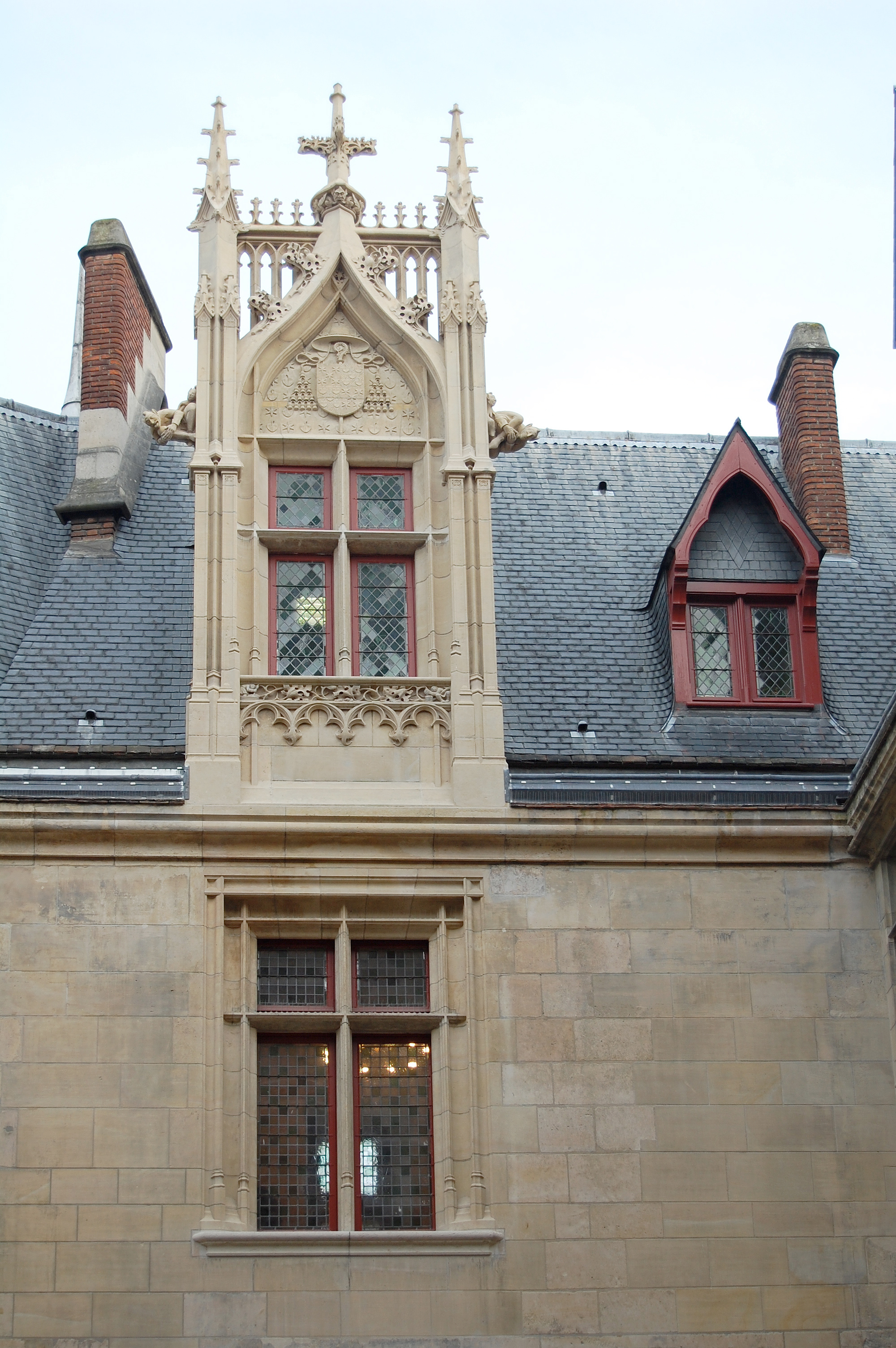
Flamboyant Gothic building with cross-windows

A cross-window is a window whose lights are defined by a mullion and a transom, forming a cross.

The Late Gothic cross-window is known since the 14th century and replaced the hitherto common Romanesque or Gothic arched window on buildings. Since then the latter have almost exclusively been reserved for church buildings. The two, upper lights were usually somewhat smaller than the two lower ones and could be opened separately. The latter is also true for a transom window, which has a horizontal bar or transom separating the lights.

== Design ==
Parts of a casement cross-window, viewed from the outside

Characteristically the rectangular window is divided into four individual lights by a mullion and transom in the form of a Latin cross. The window cross was original made of stone ('stone cross-window'); not until the Renaissance and Baroque periods did the timber cross-window emerge (e. g. on the abbey castle of Escorial and on other buildings in the Herrerian style). Where the transom is in the middle, the window is divided into four lights of equal size. Later the windows were often divided into six lights, the two upper ones often being joined and forming a type of fanlight.

== Literature ==
- Meyers Enzyklopädisches Lexikon. Bibliographisches Institut, Mannheim/Wien/Zürich 1973, Vol. 8, p. 638.
