= Monteagudo =

Monteagudo is the name of:

Places

- Monteagudo, Bolivia, a town in Bolivia
- Monteagudo, Navarre, a town and municipality located in the province of Navarre, Spain
- Monteagudo del Castillo, a town and municipality in the province of Teruel, Spain
- Monteagudo de las Salinas, a town and municipality in the province of Cuenca, Spain
- Monteagudo de las Vicarías a town and municipality in the province of Soria, Spain
- Monteagudo, Murcia (es:Monteagudo (Murcia))

Other

- Chilean frigate Monteagudo, a Spanish prize captured by the Chilean Navy in 1824
- Gabino Cué Monteagudo (born 1966), Mexican politician
