= Monastery of Uclés =

Historic building in Uclés, Spain

Coordinates: 39.9804°N 2.8634°W

Monasterio de Uclés
- Monasterio de Uclés (Spanish)
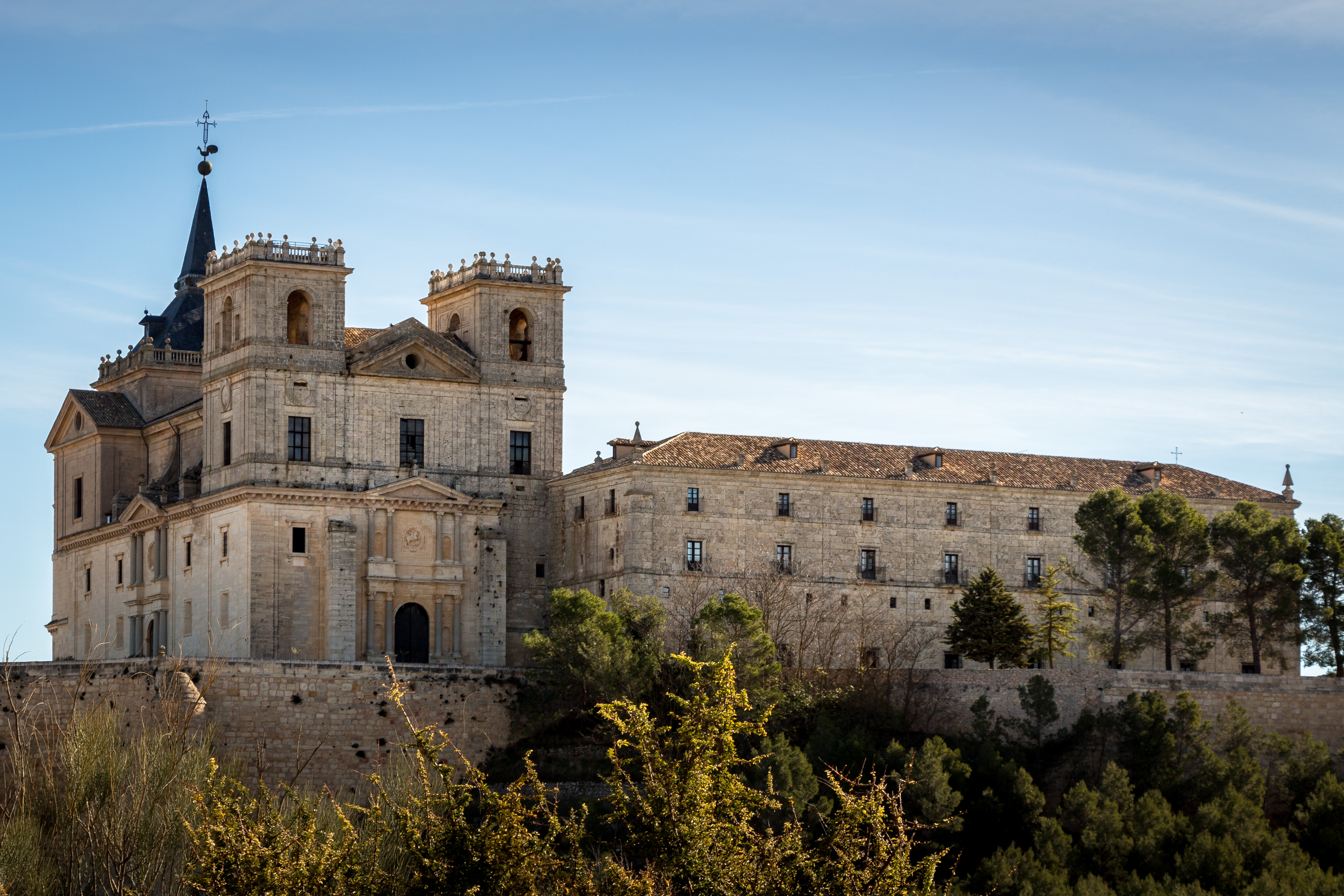

- Location within Spain
- Location: Uclés, Castile-La Mancha, Spain

Spanish Cultural Heritage
- Official name: Monasterio de Santiago Apóstol y Castillo
- Type: Monument
- Designated: 03/06/1931
- Reference no.: RI-51-0000548

The Monastery de Santiago de Uclés is in the Spanish town of Uclés in Castile-La Mancha and was built by the Order of Santiago, whose main headquarters (Caput Ordinis, "Head of the order") was in that town.

== Location ==
The monastery is at the top of a hill to the west of Uclés. It is part of a large complex of buildings built in different historical periods, starting from the Muslim domination, and reaching completion as a fortress while a possession of the Order of Santiago. This was the Order's most important home, and acquired its present aspect as part of the Reconquista.

== History ==
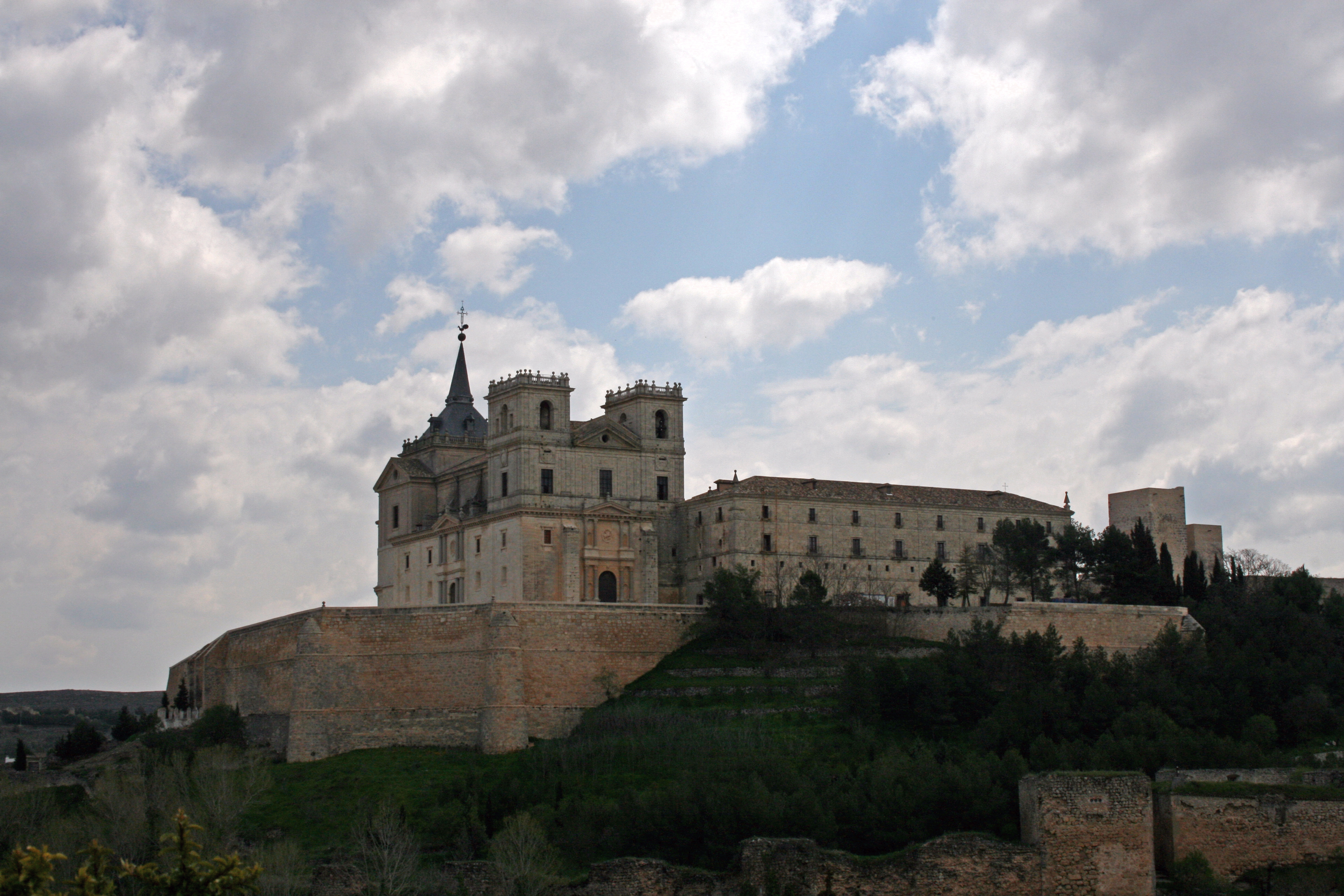
View of the Monasterio de Uclés on top of the hill of El Portillo (from the West).

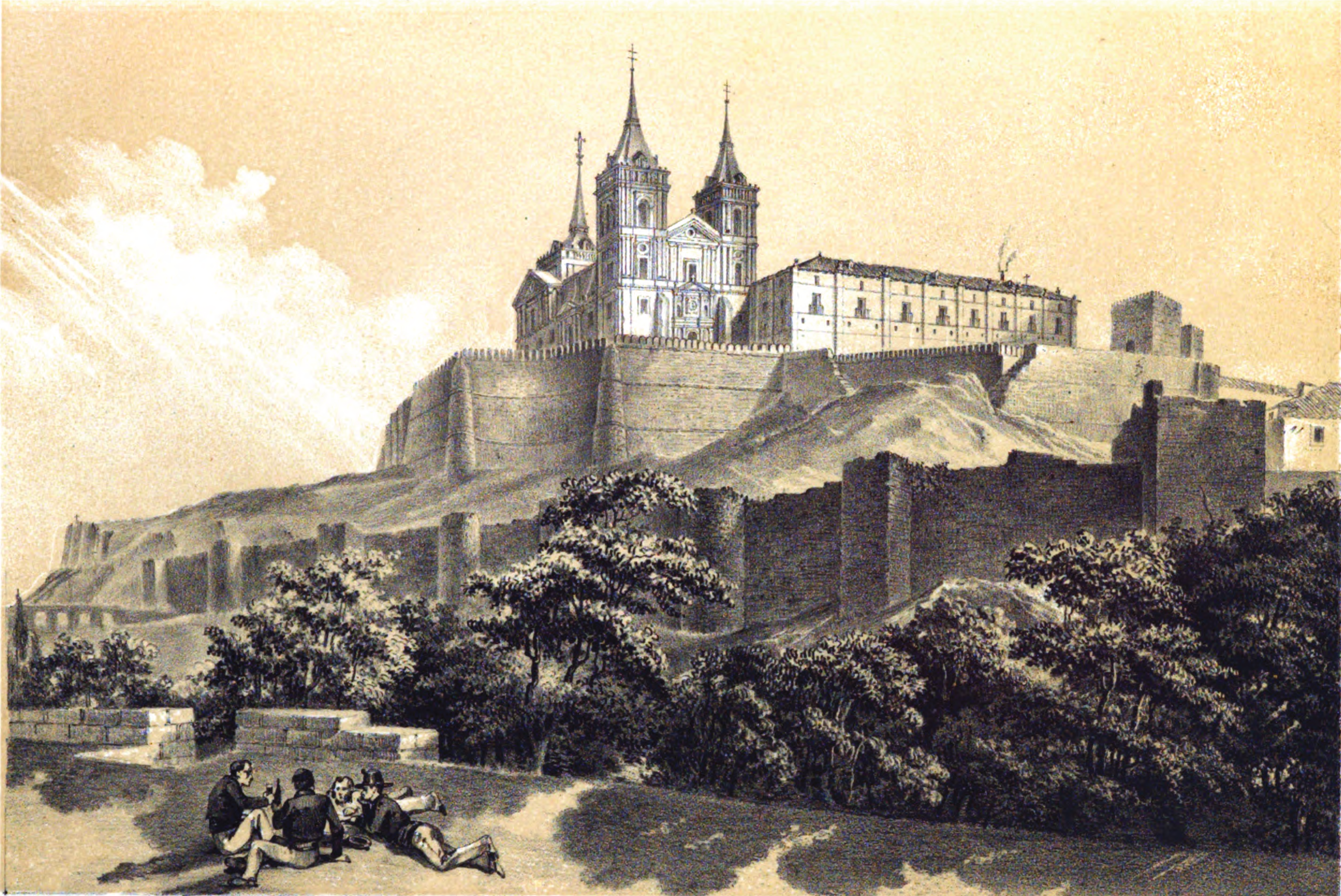
Engraving of Francisco Javier Parcerisa in 1853, shows the spires of the monastery, later lopped due to an 1877 fire and not restored.

The hill on which the monastery now stands was the site of a Celtiberian castro, a Bronze Age fortress used by the native Celts. In 893, Al-Fath ben Musa ben Dhi-l-Num, forced to withdraw from Toledo, made Uqlish (Uclés) his home and capital of the region. He had to fortify the town from attack, and built a new fortress in 896. In 1085, following the conquest of Toledo, Uqlīsh was occupied by Christians, who installed a garrison there. In 1108, the battle of Uclés—also known as the battle of Seven Counts—led to the defeat of the Christian army by Tamim ben Yusuf.

After Christians reconquered Uclés in 1174, King Alfonso VIII of Castile gave the fortress to the Order of Santiago, who made it their main headquarters.

After the end of the Reconquista, the buildings were remodeled, and many of the defensive elements of the fortress eliminated, giving it its current appearance. Two walls, however, were preserved. One of these protects the old orchard, watered with the waters of the Bedija river.

Construction of the current monastery began on May 7, 1529, during the reign of Carlos V, Holy Roman Emperor, starting with the east wing, of Plateresque style. The original traces are by Enrique Egas. Construction in the Herrerian style began in the last quarter of the 16th century. In the 17th century, the work on the courtyard and the main staircase continued, and the west and south wings were finished. In 1735, under the reign of Philip V, the east nave and the main roof were completed in the Churrigueresque style. Stone from the hill "Cabeza del Griego" (Segobriga) was used, particularly in the eastern façade.

In 1836, with the confiscation of Mendizábal, the Order of Santiago were forced to leave the complex. Though plans existed in the early 20th century for the monastery to become a secondary school, and later a novitiate and college of Augustinians, it was ransacked and damaged in 1936 during the Spanish Civil War. During the three years of the war, the complex was a makeshift hospital, and served as a prison for political prisoners after the war ended, between the years 1939 and 1943. Prisoners who died of disease or who were put to death were buried in an area outside the monastery known as "La Tahona". In October 1949, the monastery was host to a minor seminary of the bishopric of Cuenca, called "Santiago Apóstol".

=== Bien de Interés Cultural ===
The monastery was declared a National Monument on June 3, 1931. In 2003, protection was extended to its surrounding environment.

== Architecture ==
Construction was carried out over a long period of time, so the monastery exhibits three architectural styles: Plateresque, Herrerian and Churrigueresque. The east wing of the monastery, from the first half of the 16th century, was executed in Plateresque style. The Herrerian style church in the north wing was completed in 1602. The rest of the monastery, built in the 17th century, is of Baroque style, and culminates with its Churrigueresque facade work by Pedro de Ribera.

=== Plateresque Style ===
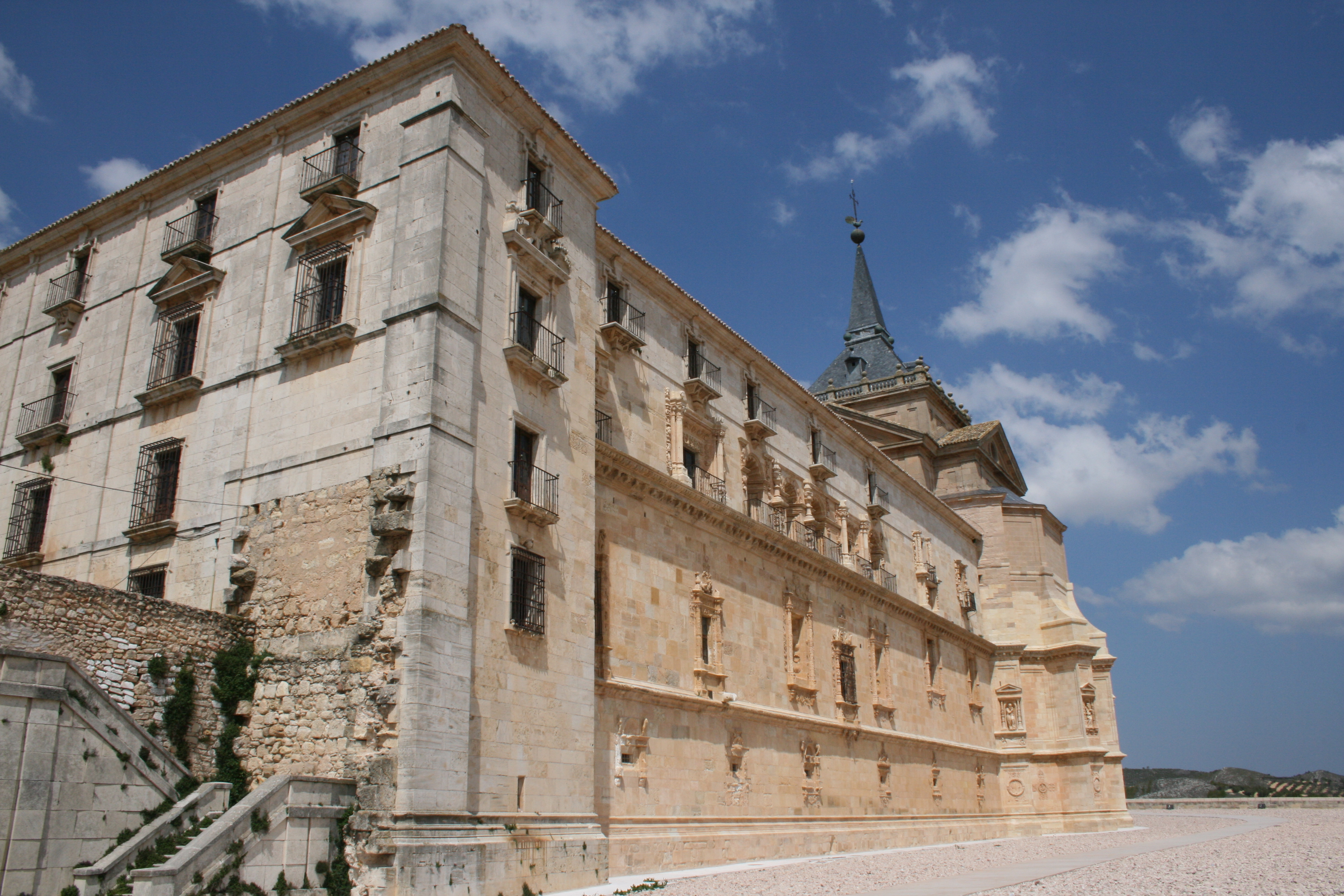
Eastern facade.

Plateresque style is so named because its decoration imitates the filigrees that goldsmiths performed on silver. This part of the building was designed by Enrique Egas and executed by Francisco de Luna, Pedro de Vandelvira, Gaspar de Vega, Pedro Tolosa, Diego de Alcántara and Bartolomé Ruiz.

The Plateresque decoration is clearly seen in the asymmetric windows of the eastern facade, in which skulls, shells, crosses, and other allegorical motifs are repeated. The coffered ceiling of its refectory features carvings of longleaf pine, and has thirty-six caissons corresponding to thirty-six busts of masters, priors, and knights of the Order of Santiago. One of the most prominent is dedicated to Don Álvaro de Luna. Instead of his effigy, there is a crowned skull surrounded by the inscription, "You, noble lords, know that anyone forgives." The image of Carlos V, Holy Roman Emperor occupies the central place with its imperial attributes, a sword and an orb. The south side displays the shield of Spain. The old sacristy has two ships at right angles and its dome is ribbed with ogival elements. The Plateresque work also covers friezes, columns, and pilasters.

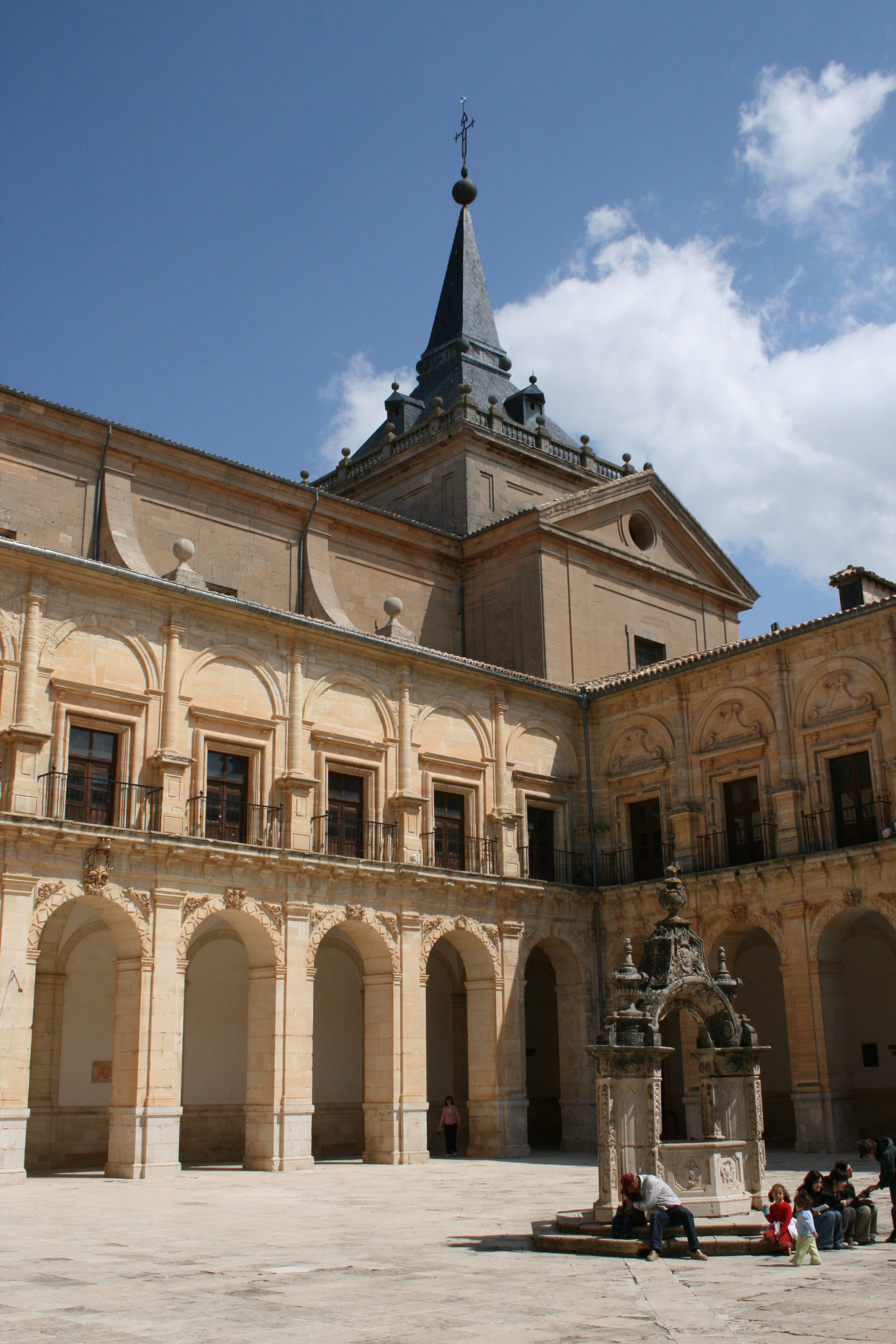
View of the tower of the front of the church from the patio.

=== Herrerian Style ===
The church completed in 1598, is a work by Francisco de Mora, a disciple of Juan de Herrera, architect of El Escorial. The church earned the nickname, "Escorial of La Mancha". The church, in the shape of a Latin cross, has a single nave with five sections and a high choir. It is sixty-five meters long and twelve meters wide. The cruise is higher and is closed in lantern shape. It is separated by a grille decorated with the royal arms and the cross of Saint James. The dome, by Antonio Segura, is adorned with gores on scallops. In its only nave, side chapels interconnect and form two aisles.

The altarpiece is of Greco-Roman style with Baroque trends. It was commissioned to Francisco García Dardero. The painting of Saint James presiding the altarpiece is by Francisco Rizi, who was a portrait painter of Philip IV.

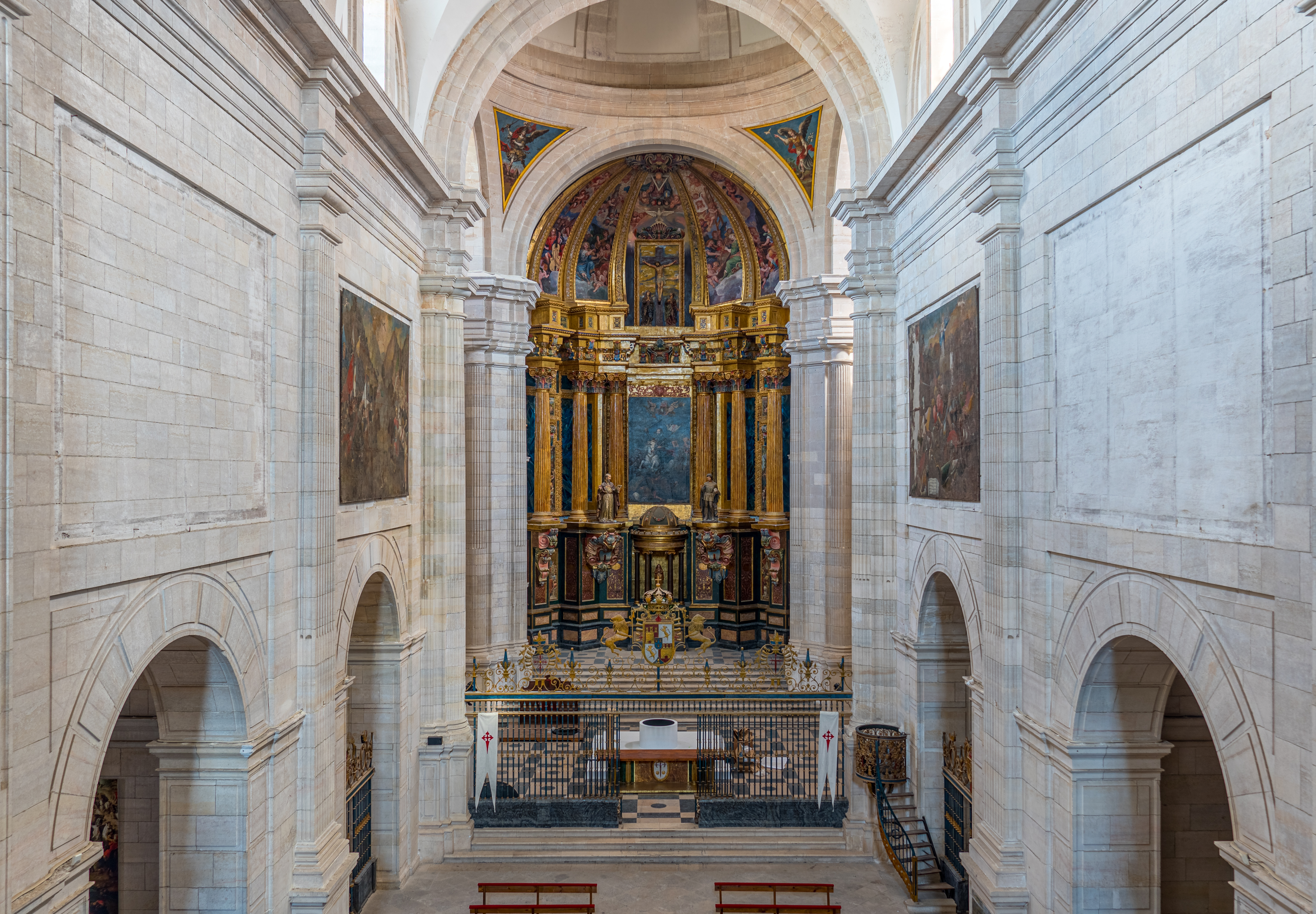
Herrerian architecture. Francisco de Mora.

Between the sacristy and the church is the entrance to the crypt, which has a Latin cross. Though the crypt no longer contains remains, it previously held the remains of many members of the Order of Santiago, including Doña Urraca, the Grand Master Rodrigo Manrique and his wife, and his famous son Jorge Manrique. In the 17th century, the remains in the church of Santiago were relocated to a subterranean chapel under the choir. It is possible that a cell in the crypt, under the main altar, held the prisoner Francisco de Quevedo.

In the 17th century, the monastery's patio was built, including two floors of galleries.

The cloister has thirty-six balconies on a closed upper floor.

The west facade was planned by Francisco de Mora, but was not built by him. It is also of Herrerian style and contains the front entrance of the church. This facade was flanked by two towers with high spires that disappeared in the fires of 1845 and 1877.

=== Churrigueresque style ===
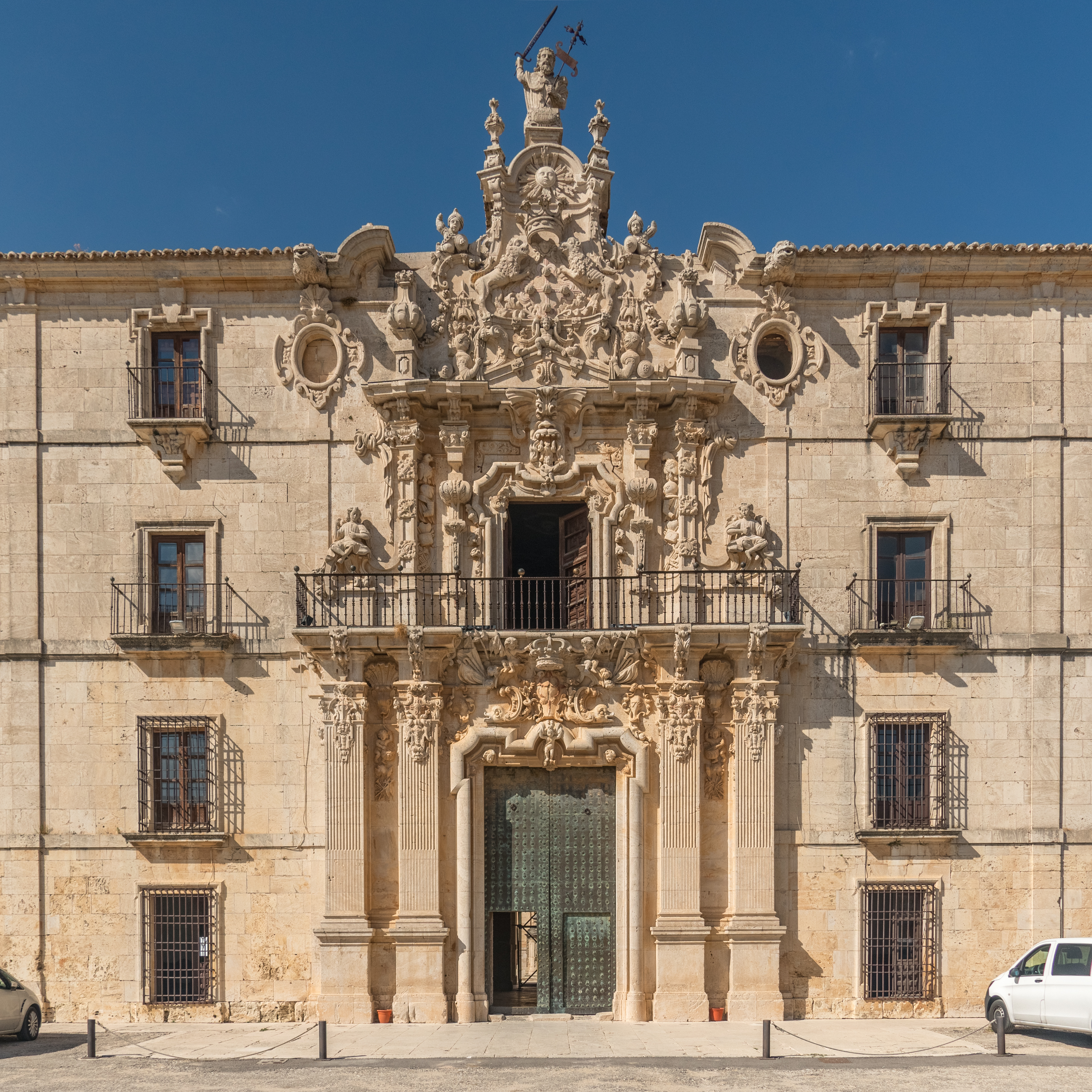
Main facade of the monastery.

The main facade was built in 1735 by Pedro de Ribera, a Baroque master of the court. It is built as an altarpiece facade with carved ornamentation. The facade features four non-load bearing, decorative pilasters. The decorative carvings include dolphins, lions, heads, warriors, trophies, fruits, and two crosses of Saint James. The summit is decorated with two busts of chained Moors, and a bust of Saint James with a cross in his left hand and a sword in his right. An inscription reads Fidei defensio ("Defense of the faith"). At the bottom is the inscription Caput Ordinis ("Head of the Order"), freestanding crosses, a royal crown, knights with trophies, and chained Moors.

== The old fortress ==
Three towers remain of the old fortress of the Order of Santiago. Though their names are mistaken in many sources, the guestbooks of the Order that are saved in the National Historical Archive name them as follows: the Tower del Pontido, connected by a footbridge to the Tower del Palomar, which is linked by a drawbridge to a wall leading to the Albarrana tower. The exact locations of other towers are unknown, as those towers were demolished for other church construction.

=== Archaeological remains ===
In the present monastery there are several additional remains of the ancient fortress:

- A section of wall at the east end of the main facade. It corresponds to a tower that was above of the head of the old church, which was located at the site of the current hall.
- Another section of wall on the right side of the main entrance of the present church.
- The underground of the ancient monastery with arches in the second basement, and a pointed arch in the first.

== Bibliography ==
- Ángel Horcajada Garrido. Uclés. Capital de un estado. Cuenca: el author; 1983.
- Dimas Pérez Ramírez. Uclés, cabeza de la Orden de Santiago. Tarancón: Seminario Menor; 1990.
- Pelayo Quintero Atauri. Uclés, antigua residencia de la Orden de Santiago. Madrid: Fortanet; 1904 (2007 reprint).
- Milagros Rivera Garretas (1995). La encomienda, el priorato y la villa de Uclés en la Edad Media : (1174-1310) : formación de un señorío de la Orden de Santiago. Madrid: Consejo Superior de Investigaciones Científicas. ISBN 84-00-05970-0.
