= Convento de San José (Ávila) =

Monastery in Ávila, Spain

Coordinates: 40.6552°N 4.6922°W

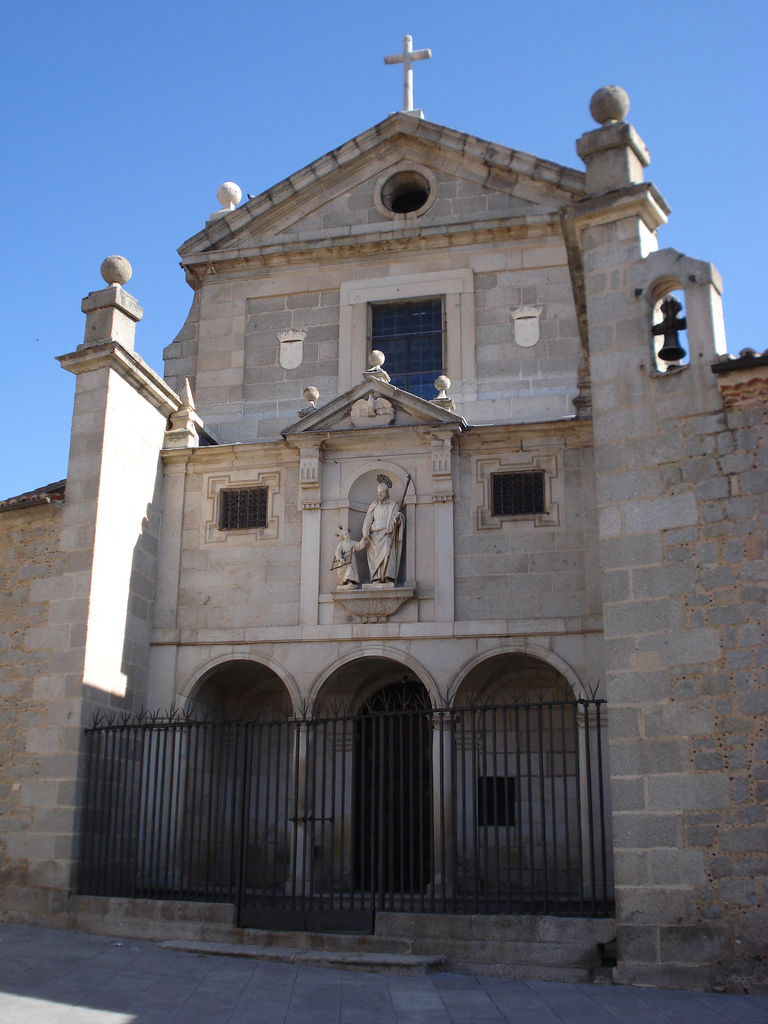
- Main facade by Francisco de Mora, the ornamental statue is by Giraldo di Merlo.

Religion
- Affiliation: Roman Catholic
- Status: Monastery

Location
- Location: Ávila, Spain
- Interactive map of Convento de San José
- UNESCO World Heritage Site
- Criteria: Cultural: (iii), (iv)
- Designated: 1985 (9th session)
- Parent listing: Old Town of Ávila with its Extra-Muros Churches
- Reference no.: 348-003
- Spanish Cultural Heritage
- Type: Non-movable
- Criteria: Monument
- Designated: 11 May 1968
- Reference no.: RI-51-0003796

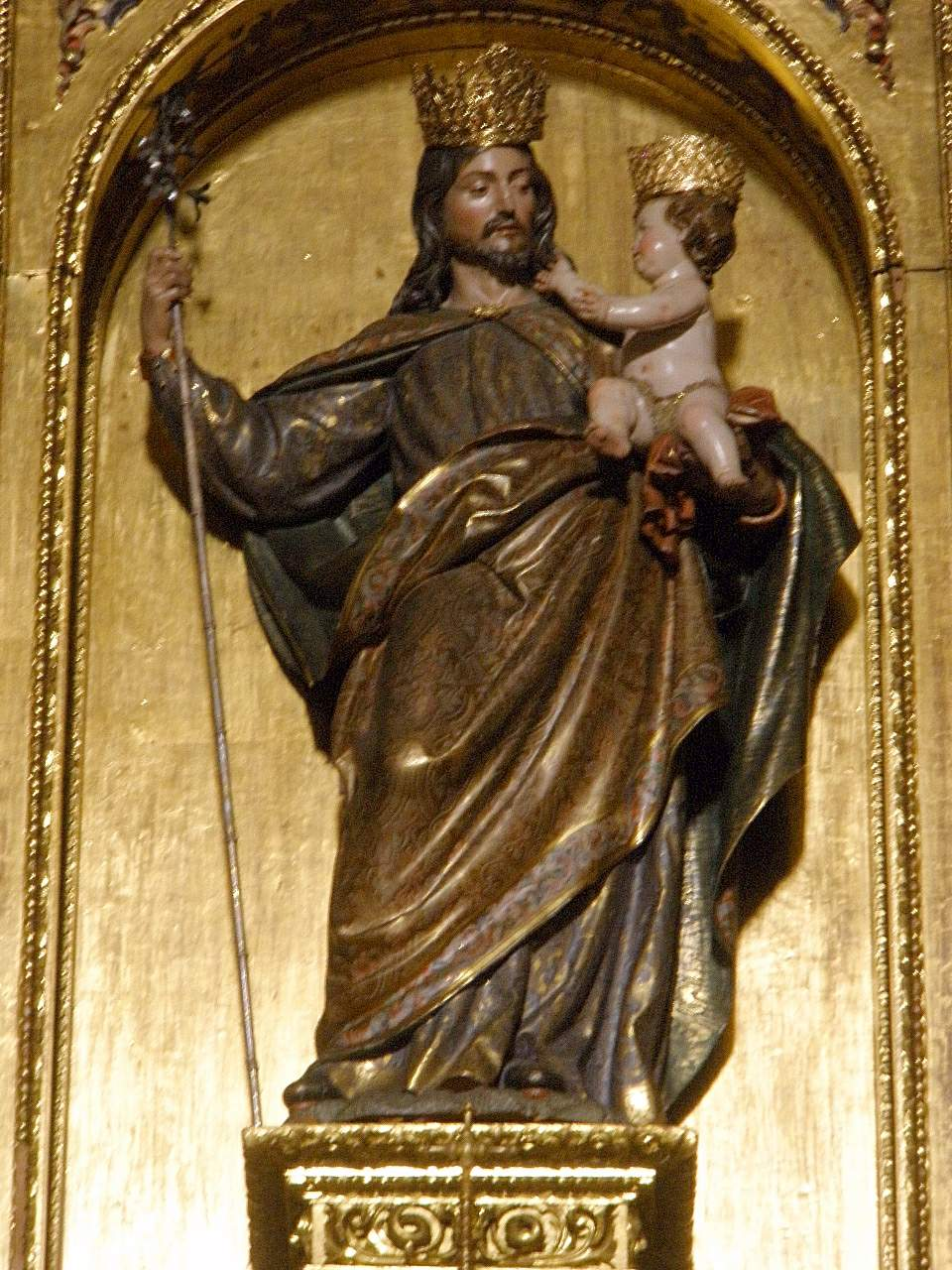
The enshrined image of Saint Joseph at the high altar of the convent, crowned by Pope Paul VI on 24 August 1963.

The Convento de San José (English: Convent of Saint Joseph) is a monastery of Discalced Carmelite nuns in Ávila, Spain. It is situated not far from the center of the city but outside the medieval walls. Saint Teresa of Jesus was the driving force behind the foundation of the monastery, which was built from 1562 onwards. The church (by Francisco de Mora) was only begun in 1607 after Saint Teresa's death. The statue in the facade was commissioned by King Philip III of Spain via artist Giraldo de Merlo.

== History ==
The Convent of Saint Joseph is a monastery of Discalced Carmelite nuns located in the Spanish city of Ávila, in the autonomous community of Castile and León. It was the first monastery founded by Saint Teresa of Jesus, who had the support of such important figures as the Bishop of Ávila, Alvaro Hurtado de Mendoza, who was later buried there.

The convent was built in the year of 1562, although the church, its most important architectural element, was built only in 1607.

On 24 August 1963, Pope Paul VI sent Cardinal Arcadio Larraona Saralegui to canonically crown their antiquated image of Saint Joseph, enshrined within their convent. The same Cardinal as prefect of Sacred Congregation of Rites executed their papal bull of coronation, initially signed by Pope John XXIII.

== Architecture ==
The church was designed by the architect Francisco de Mora (1553–1610), who devised a church with a single nave covered with a vaulted ceiling and a dome over the transept.

Its main facade can be seen as divided into two shared plans with a pediment at the top and a portico of three arches at the bottom. This design was one of the most imitated in the religious buildings of the seventeenth century and was adopted as a model of Discalced Carmelite construction. Inside the church is the Chapel of the Guillamas family, which serves as the family crypt.

== Conservation ==
The Convent of Saint Joseph has been protected under Spanish law since 1968 when it was designated a national monument. The convent is protected as part of a World Heritage Site, "Old Town of Avila and its extra muros churches". The monastery was not included in the site when it was first designated, but has been added with a defined area of 0.29 ha. It is listed as one of ten extra muros churches (that is, outside the walled city) included in the site.

The convent currently houses a museum dedicated to Saint Teresa of Jesus, the Museo Teresiano of the Discalced Carmelites.

== See also ==
- Order of the Discalced Carmelites
