= Monteagudo de las Salinas =

- Municipality
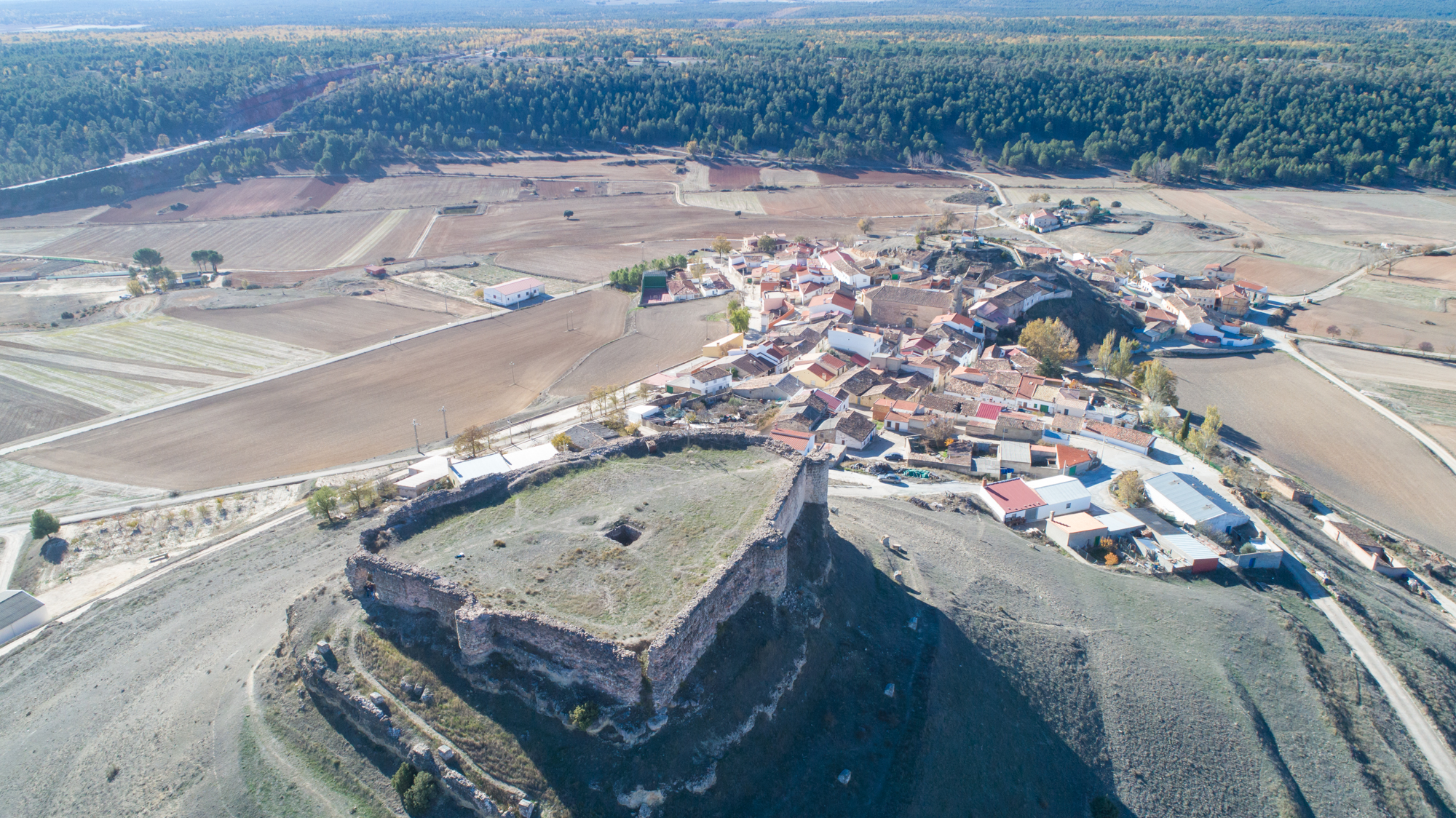
- View of Montegaudo

- Location within Spain Location within Castilla-La Mancha
- Coordinates: 39°48′N 1°54′W
- Country: Spain
- Autonomous community: Castile-La Mancha
- Province: Cuenca

Population (2025-01-01)
  - Total: 126
- Time zone: UTC+1 (CET)
  - Summer (DST): UTC+2 (CEST)

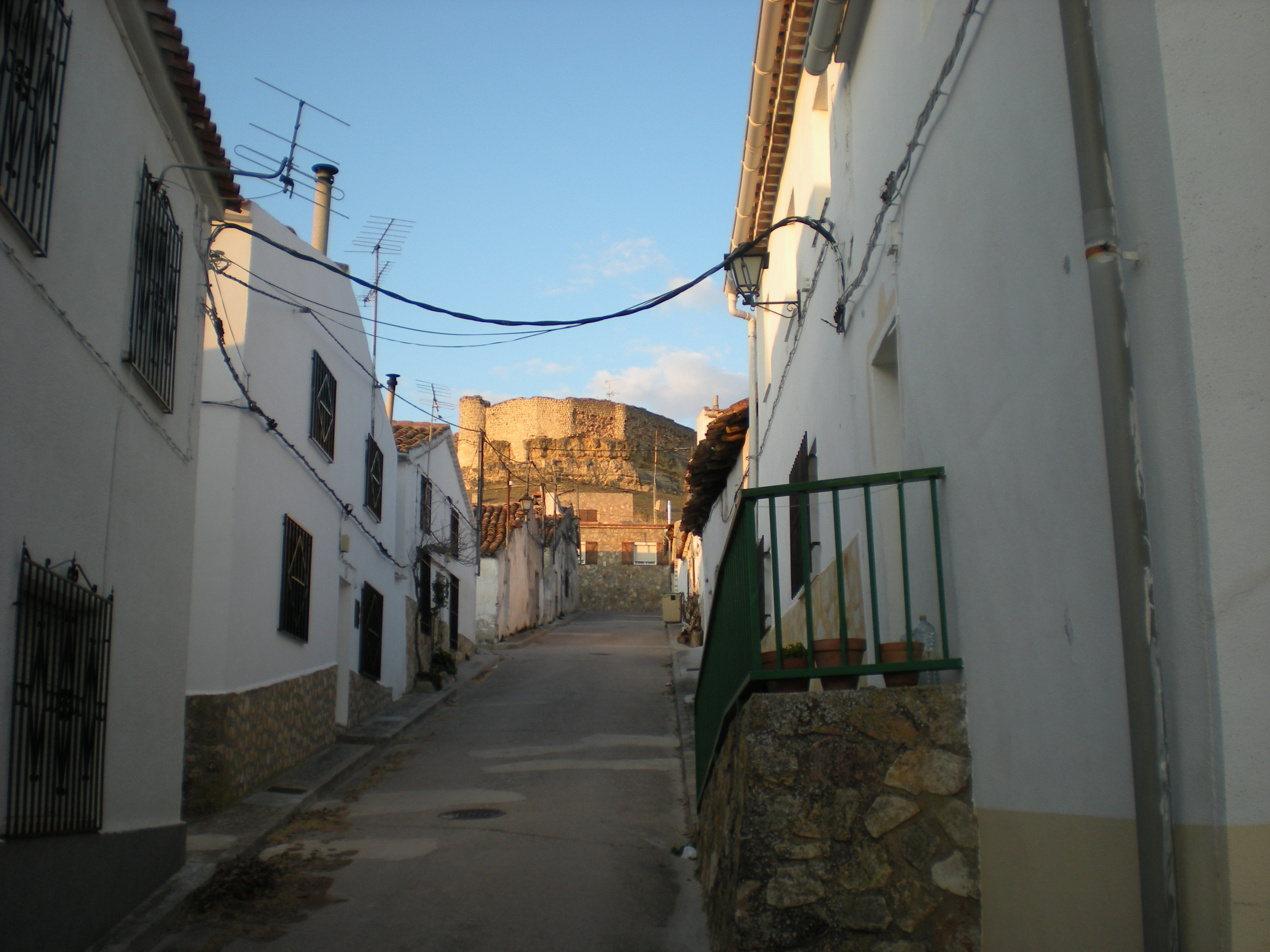
A street in Monteagudo

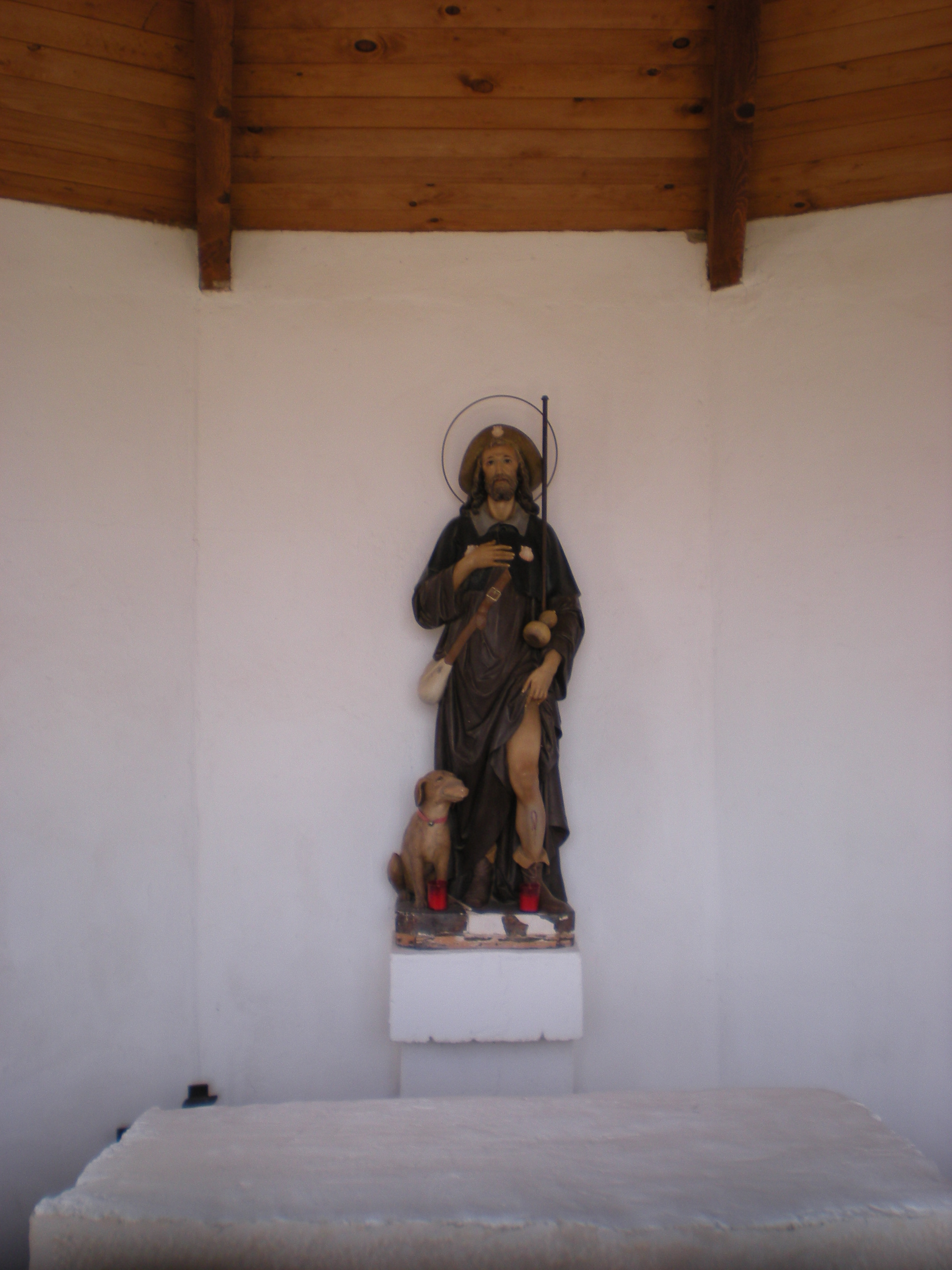
San Roque

Monteagudo de las Salinas is a municipality in Cuenca Province, Castile-La Mancha, Spain.

It has a population of 133.
