= Herrerian style =

Architectural style in Renaissance Spain

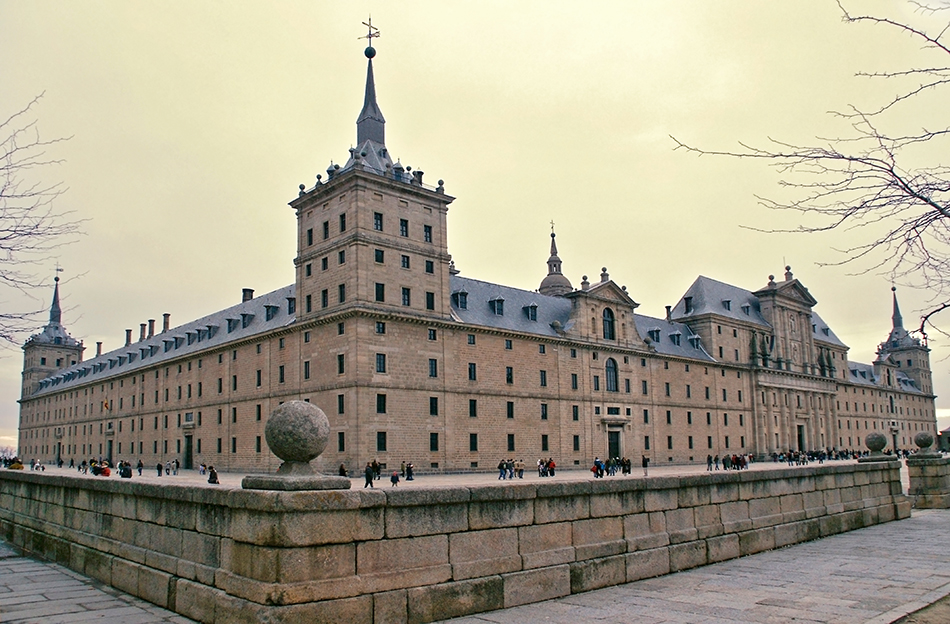
Herrerian façade of the Monastery of El Escorial.

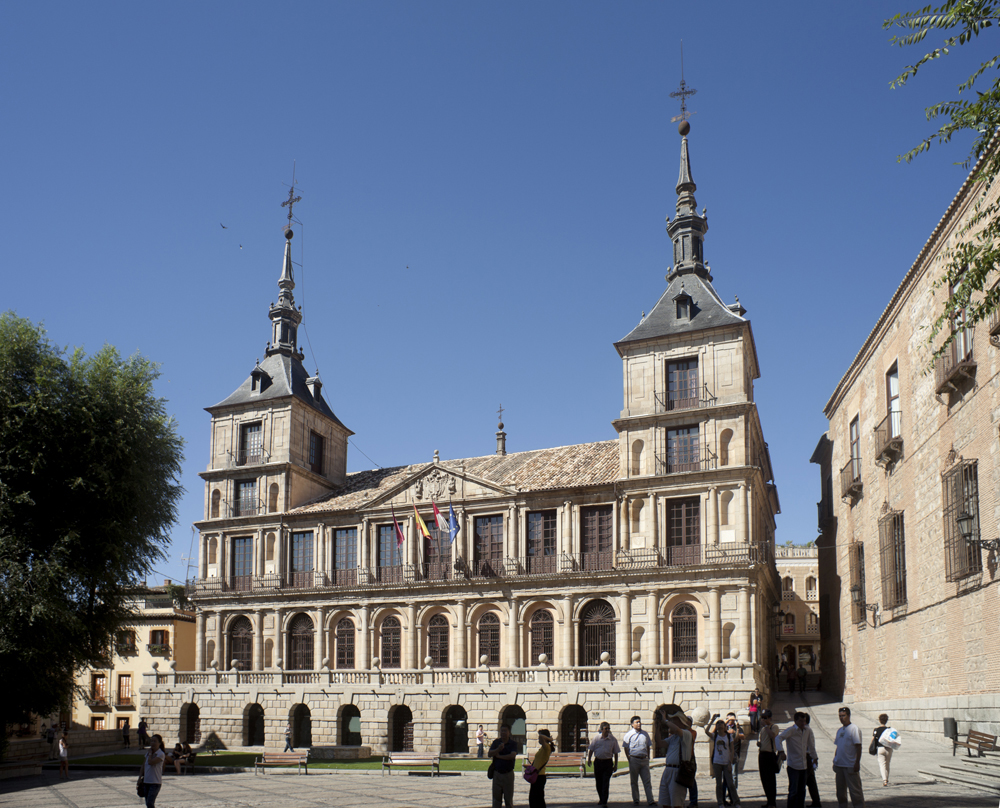
Casa consistorial de Toledo in Toledo, Castile-La Mancha, built between 1575 and 1703.

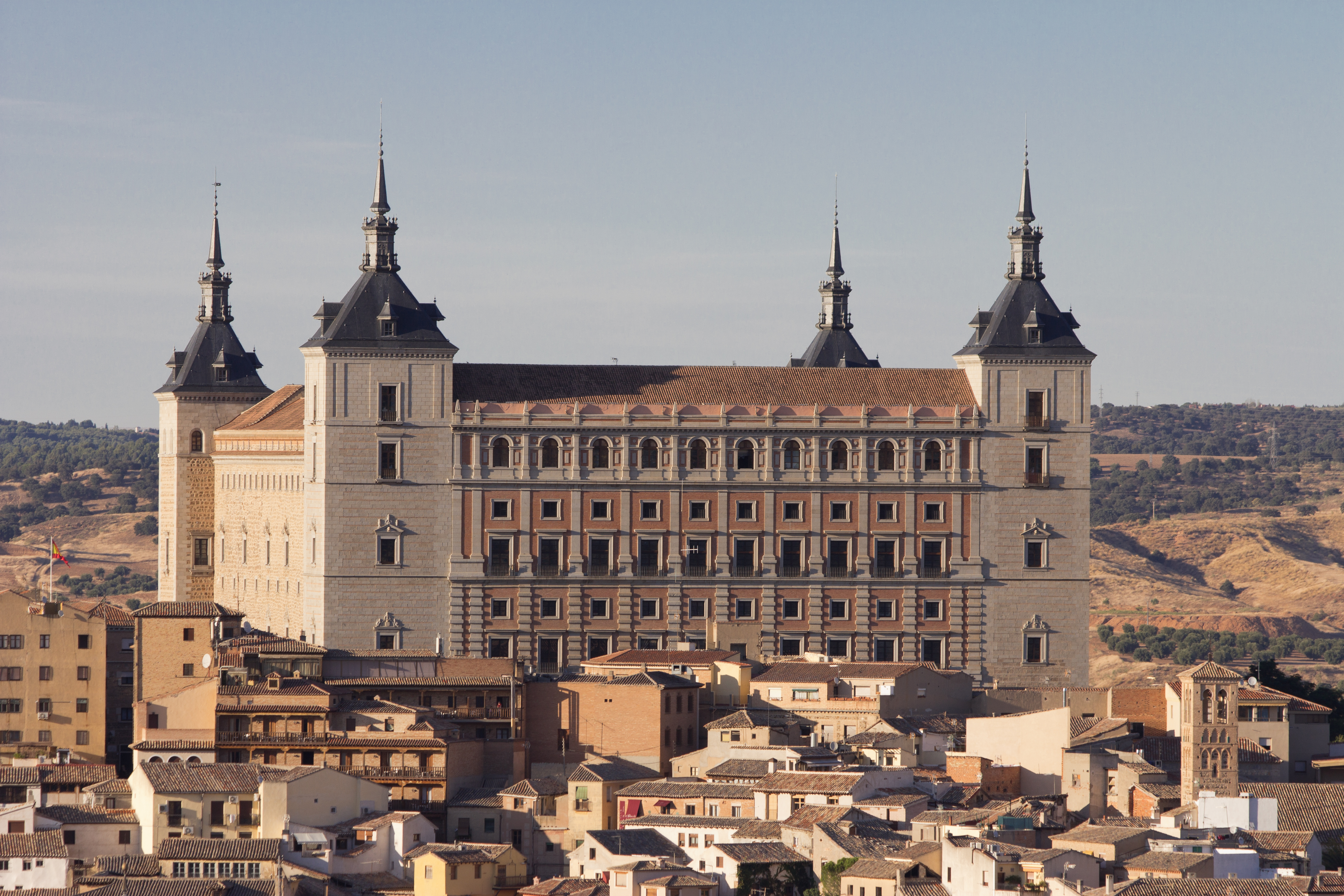
Alcázar of Toledo.

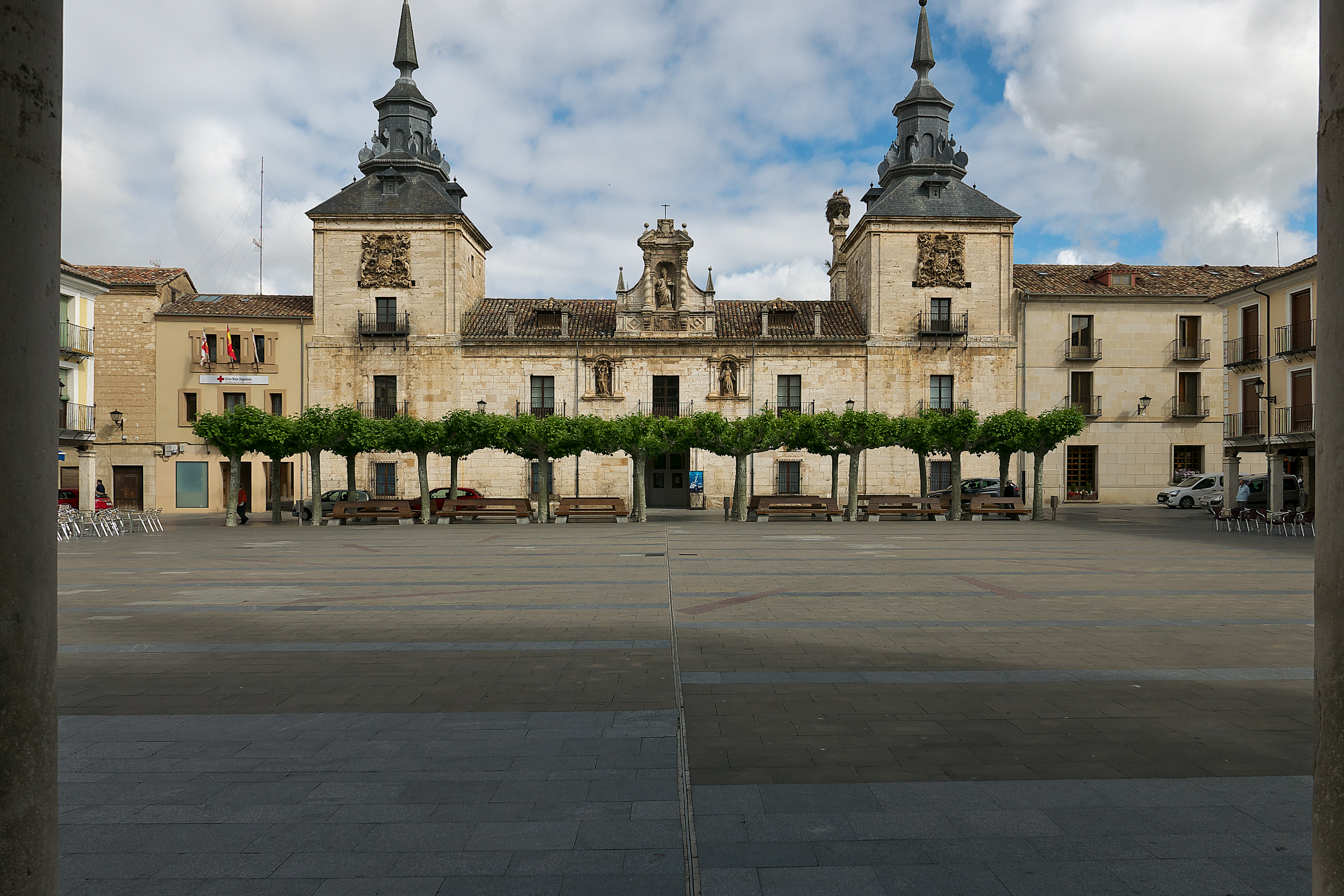
Hospital de San Agustín in El Burgo de Osma, Province of Soria, built between 1694 and 1699.

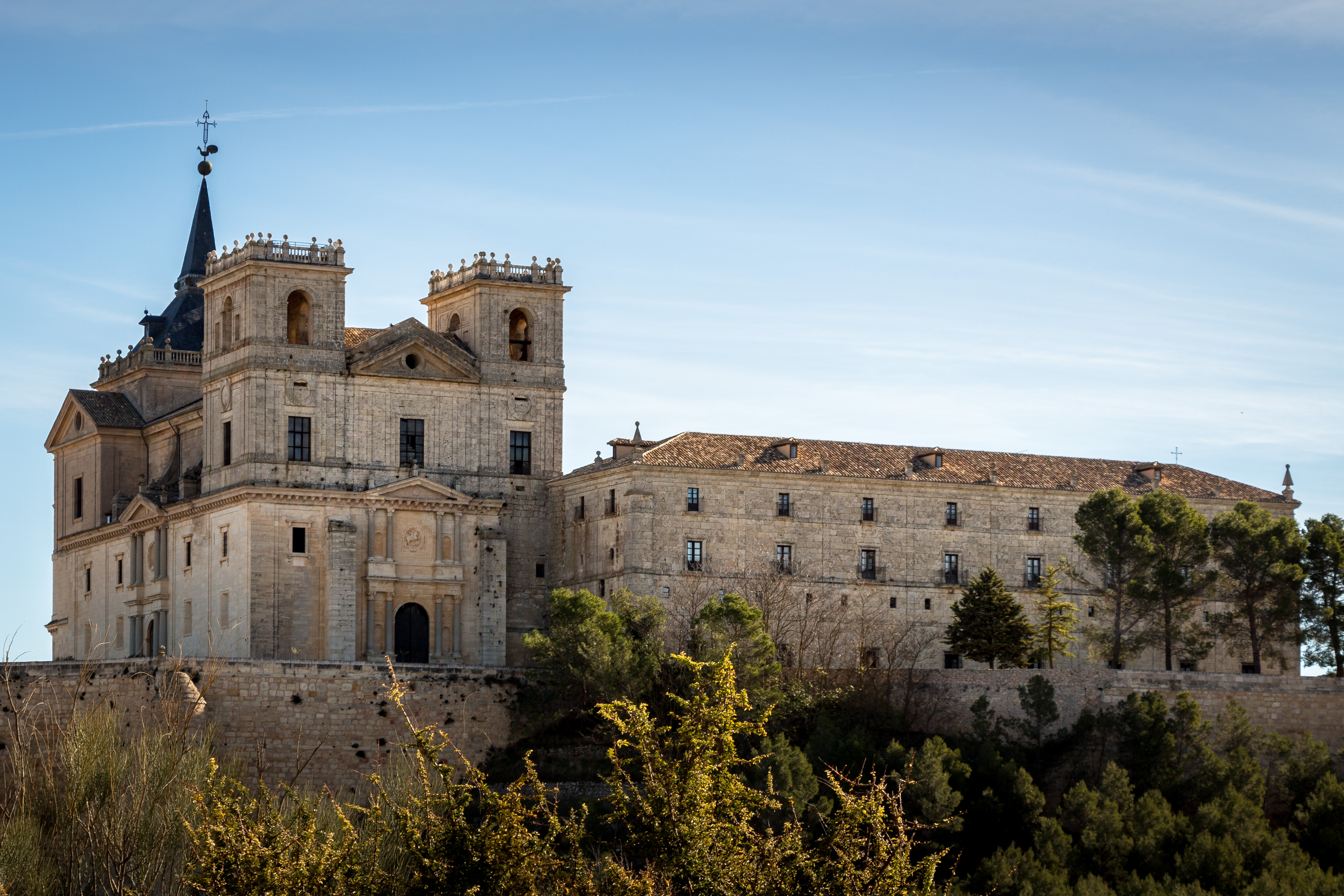
Monastery of Uclés, province of Cuenca.

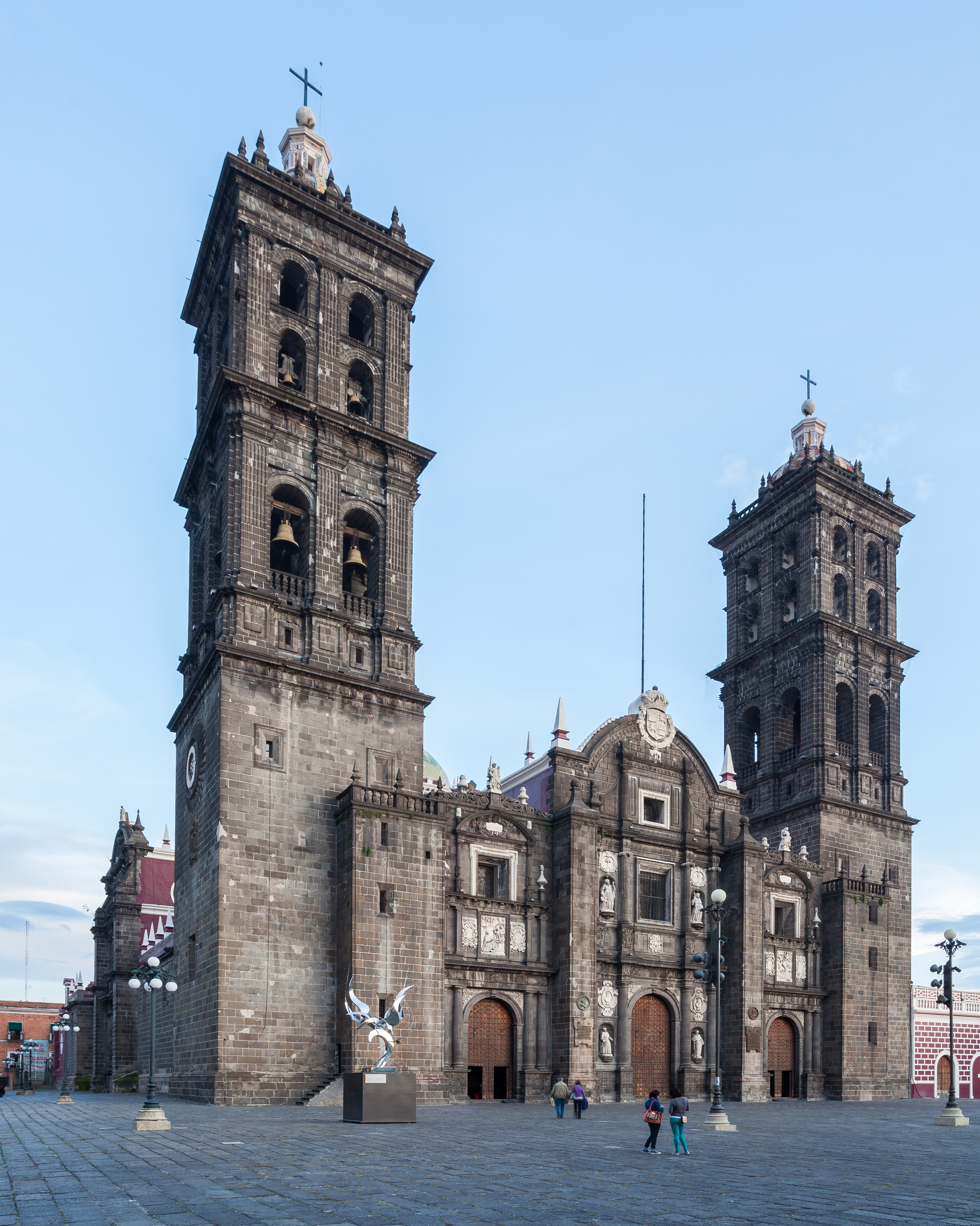
UNESCO World Heritage Puebla Cathedral is an example of Herrerian style in Mexico.

The Herrerian style (Spanish: estilo herreriano or arquitectura herreriana) of architecture was developed in Spain during the last third of the 16th century under the reign of Philip II (1556–1598), and continued in force in the 17th century, but transformed by the Baroque style of the time. It corresponds to the third and final stage of Spanish Renaissance architecture, whose dominant trend had been towards austerity and minimal decoration. The ornate Plateresque style had given way to classical Purism in the second third of the 16th century. Purism in turn had given way to the geometric simplicity of the Herrerian style.

It originated with the construction of the Monastery of El Escorial (San Lorenzo de El Escorial, Community of Madrid) and, more specifically, with the reorganization of the project made by Cantabrian architect Juan de Herrera (1530–1597), after the death of Juan Bautista de Toledo (1515–1567), author of the first design.

Its main representatives are the aforementioned Herrera, to whom the style owes its name, and Francisco de Mora (1553–1610), Herrera's disciple and architect of the Ducal Palace of Lerma and other key works of Herrerian architecture.

== Features ==
The Herrerian architecture, or Herrerian style is characterized by its geometric rigor, the mathematical relation between the various architectural features, the clean volumes, the dominance of the wall over the span and the almost total absence of decoration, which is why in time was called estilo desornamentado ("unornamented style). It's also known as the Escorial style, referring to the building that serves as best example for the architectural style.

Herrerian buildings stand out for their severe horizontality, achieved thanks to the balance of shapes, preferably cubic, that are arranged symmetrically in the structure. In general, they have wooden roofs clad on the outside with slate and lateral towers, finished off in conical or pyramidal quadrangular spiers topped by points, known as Madrid-style spiers or simply as a Madrid spire, which introduce an element of verticality and magnificence, at the same time helping to reinforce the feeling of symmetry.

At other cases, not looking both the horizontal and the bulkiness, which is reached through the geometrical design of the various architectural elements. This is the case of the model used in the construction of parish churches, with great façades, quadrangular towers and heavy buttresses.

The works are typically large-scale and defined by a minimalist, monumental aesthetic.

In regard to decorative applications, these reduce the use of basic geometric shapes such as spheres and pyramids. From a sociological standpoint, this sobriety is a response to Protestantism, in line with the guidelines set by the Council of Trent (1545–1563).

=== Spire ===
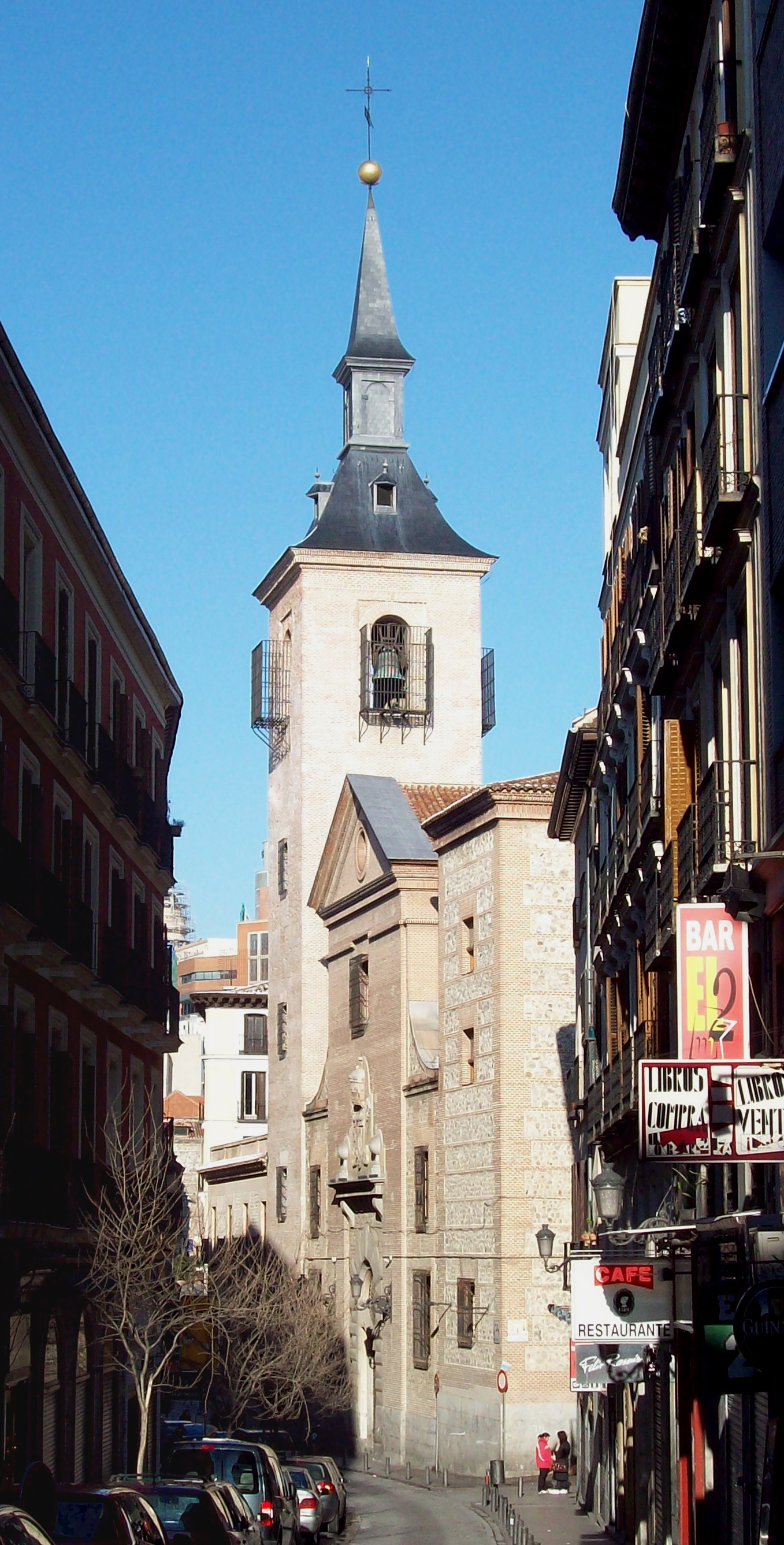
Typical Madrid spire of the San Gines Church, Madrid

The Madrid-style generally consists of a quadrangular tower at its base, on top of it a conical or pyramidal wooden frame with a slate or metal cover with dormers directed towards the four cardinal points. In the angle of the main pyramid or skirt the lantern or temple is located and on it an elongated quadrangular pyramid, sometimes octagonal, on which a metallic sphere or ball, the weather vane and finally the metal cross are placed, as frequent decorations.

The proportional height of the Madrid spire with respect to the total dimension of the tower, is generally one third of its total height or sometimes greater, with which an effect of notable verticality and elevation perception is achieved, even more so when viewed from the distance.

Spread in Madrid, Toledo and areas of influence, between the 16th and 18th centuries, it is found built of wooden armor and generally covered with slate stone or metal. It is stylistically related to the spiers of Central Europe (Austria, Flanders, the Netherlands, and others).

== Historical development ==
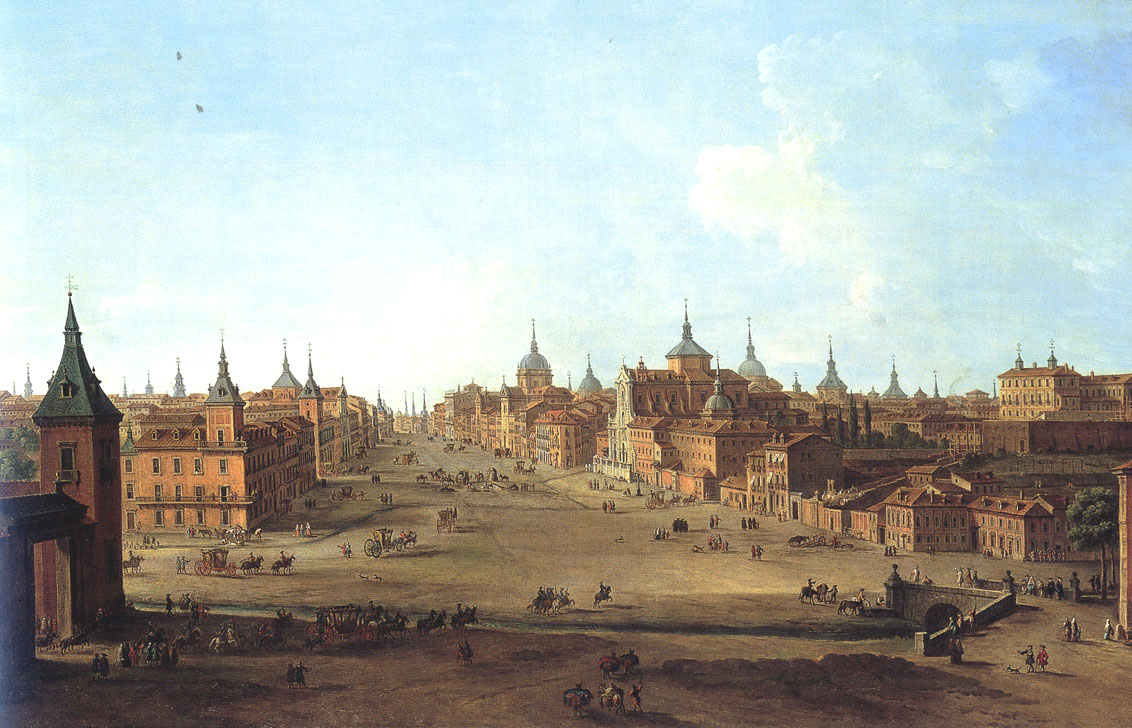
Previously the city of Madrid was full of Herrerian buildings. In the painting the Calle de Alcalá in 1750 by Antonio Joli.

The Herrerian style was the official architecture of the Habsburgs, from the reign of Philip II. The sociopolitical impact meant the construction of the Monastery of El Escorial (1563–1584) facilitated its expansion. To this contributed also the fact that Juan de Herrera was appointed in 1579 Inspector of Monuments of the Crown.

The style spread first through the comarcas of Madrid of the Sierra de Guadarrama, located within the catchment area of the Monastery of El Escorial, through two ways: works directly funded by the Royal Family and those promoted by the Guadarraman municipalities. The first category covers infrastructure such as the Puente Nuevo, in Galapagar, and buildings for private use by Philip II, as the Casa Veleta, also in the same town, and the Real Aposento de Torrelodones (both disappeared) were built for comfort the movements of the king from Madrid to El Escorial. In El Escorial, the Crown encouraged the development of various urban planning and the construction of the Church of San Bernabé, by Francisco de Mora, one of the contributors to Herrera in the works of the Royal Monastery. The Royal Family also approved the granting of benefits to those municipalities to proceed with the renovation of its main public and religious buildings. The result of this measure is the currently Herrerian aspect of the parish churches of Valdemorillo and Navalagamella, both of medieval origin.

The Herrerian style quickly spread throughout Spain and Spanish America. Some representative works are the Cathedral of Valladolid and the Puente de Segovia (Madrid), both designed by Juan de Herrera; the church of the Monasterio de Uclés (Uclés, Cuenca Province), by Francisco de Mora; the Church of San Sebastián (Villacastín, Segovia Province), attributed to Rodrigo Gil de Hontañón; the Colegiata de San Luis (Villagarcía de Campos, Valladolid Province), by the same author; and the College of Our Lady of Antigua (Monforte de Lemos, Lugo Province) by Simón de Monasterio. Special mention deserves the Ducal Palace of Lerma (Burgos Province), by Francisco de Mora that began in 1601. Led to the adoption of the emerging Herrerian style by the emerging Baroque architecture trends of the time and the establishment of a palatial architecture model, which was repeated throughout the 17th century.

Most civic buildings erected in Madrid during the reign of Philip III and Philip IV continued the architectural guidelines of that palace. This is the case of the Palace of the Councils, the Santa Cruz Palace and the Casa de la Villa, all of Baroque bill, but with notable Herrerian reminiscent. The influence of Herrerian style is also visible in the expansion that, separately, had its distinctive spire pyramidal or "madrilian spire", with slate roofs. This item was adopted by many constructions after to 16th and 17th century, mainly in the bell towers and domes of the churches, and in many civil constructions.

The 18th and 19th century meant the decline of this architectural movement. In the 20th century came to pick up, during the dictatorship of Francisco Franco. The Plaza de la Moncloa, in Madrid, anchored by the by Air Force headquarters, among many large constructions of the time, symbolizes the resurgence of Herrerian architecture.

== See also ==
- Royal Alcázar of Madrid, a defunct notable Herrerian royal castle
- Madrid spire
- El Madrid de los Austrias
- Imperial Route of the Community of Madrid
