= San Lorenzo de El Escorial =

- Municipality
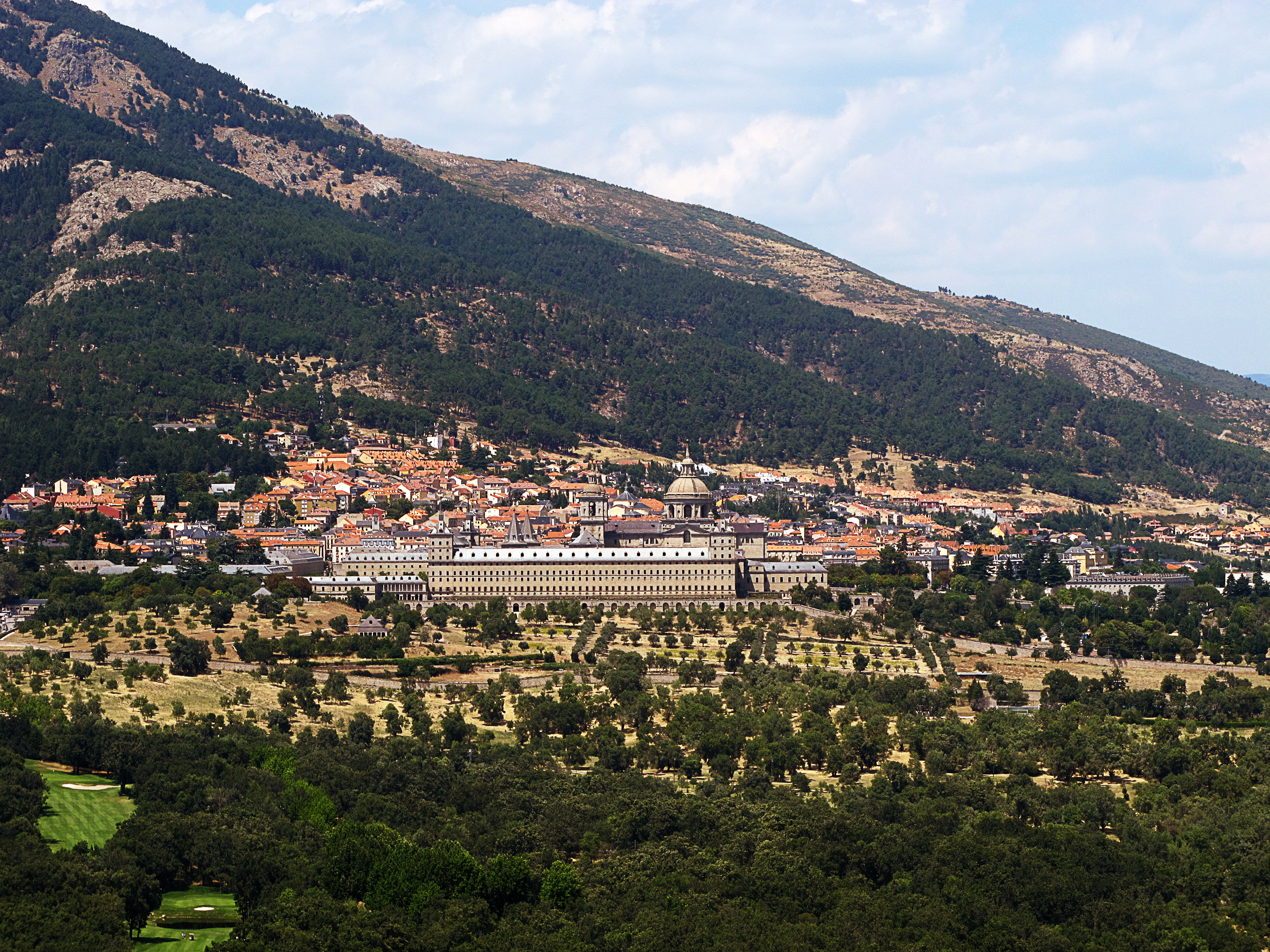

- Flag Coat of arms
- Location of San Lorenzo de El Escorial
- Coordinates: 40°35′37″N 4°8′34″W
- Country: Spain
- Autonomous community: Community of Madrid
- Province: Madrid
- Comarca: Sierra de Guadarrama
- Founded: 18th century

Government
  - Mayor: Carlota López Esteban (PP)

Area
  - Total: 56.4 km^{2} (21.8 sq mi)
- Elevation: 1,032 m (3,386 ft)

Population (2025-01-01)
  - Total: 18,872
  - Density: 335/km^{2} (867/sq mi)
- Demonym: Sanlorentinos / Gurriatos 1960-2003 Ardillas
- Time zone: UTC+1 (CET)
  - Summer (DST): UTC+2 (CEST)
- Postal code: 28200
- Website: Official website

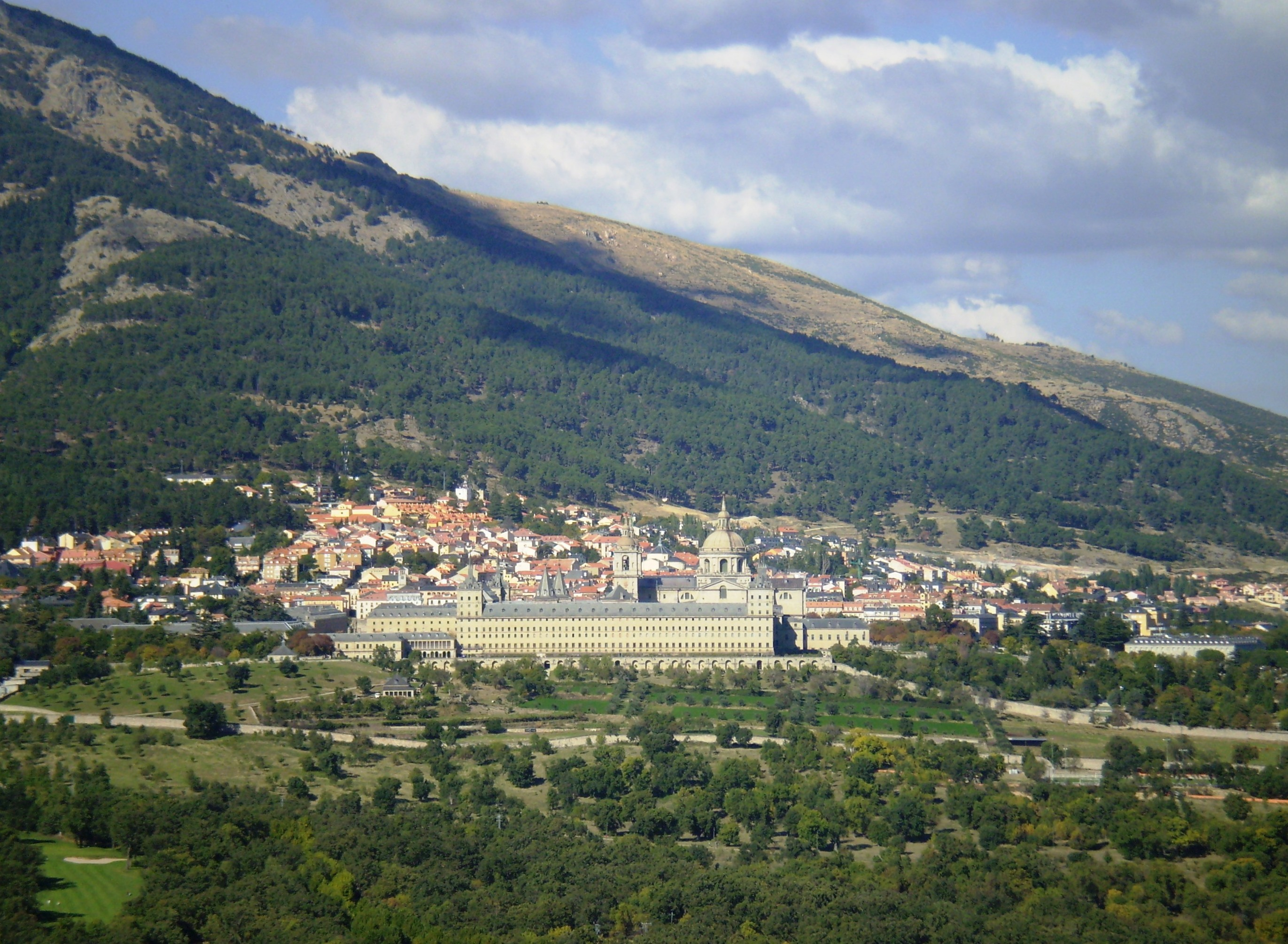
View of San Lorenzo de El Escorial, on the slopes of Mount Abantos, from the Silla de Felipe II (Seat of Philip II). In the foreground, the Monastery of El Escorial.

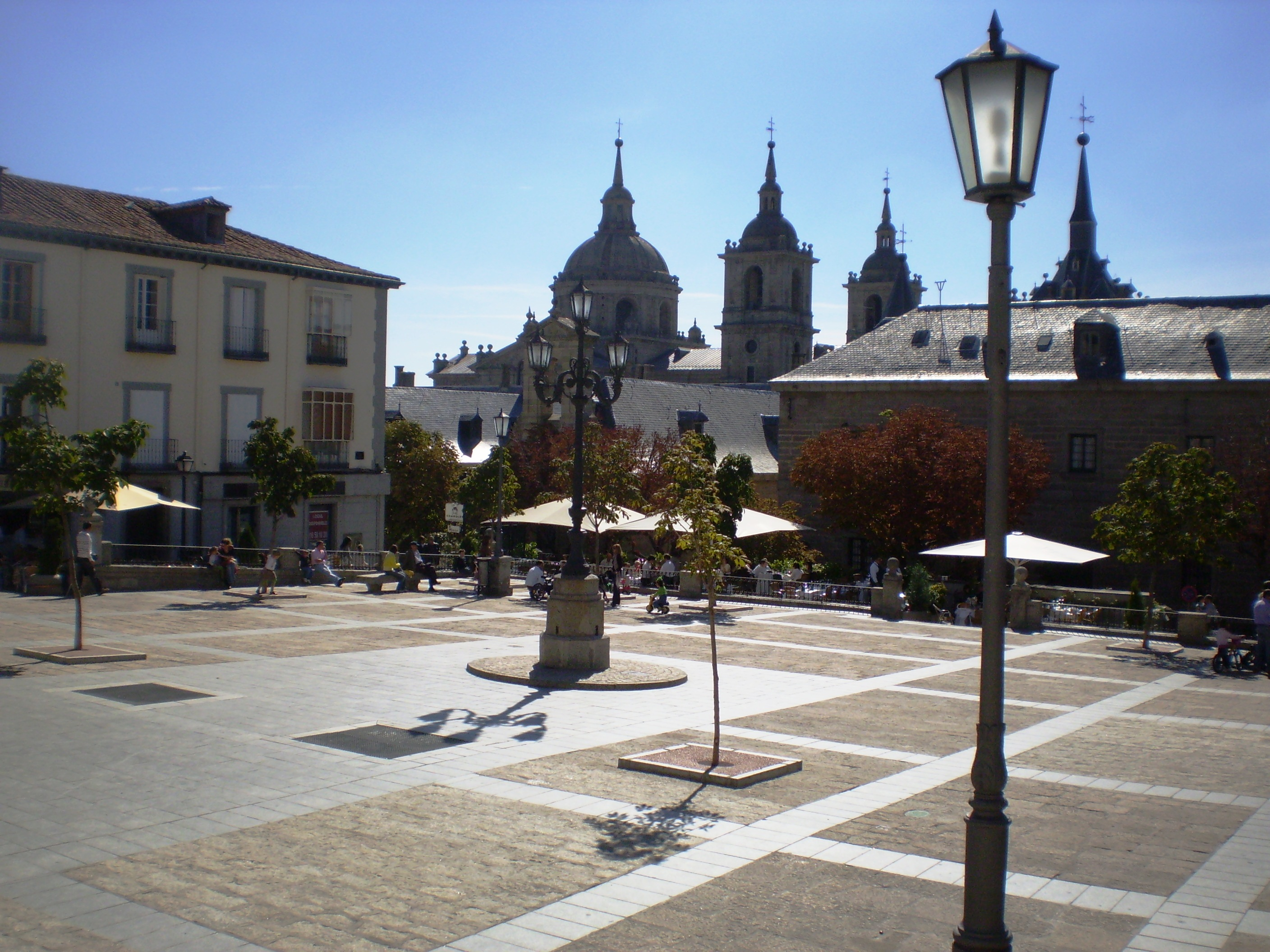
Plaza de la Constitución. In the background, the Monastery.

San Lorenzo de El Escorial, also known as El Escorial de Arriba, is a town and municipality in the Community of Madrid, Spain, located to the northwest of the region in the southeastern side of the Sierra de Guadarrama, at the foot of Mount Abantos and Las Machotas, 47 kilometres (29 mi) from Madrid. It is head of the eponymous judicial party. The settlement is popularly called El Escorial de Arriba, to differentiate it from the neighbouring village of El Escorial, also known as El Escorial de Abajo.

The Monastery of El Escorial is the most prominent building in the town and is one of the main Spanish Renaissance monuments. Especially remarkable is the Royal Library, inside the Monastery.

The monastery and its historic surroundings were declared a World Heritage Site UNESCO on November 2, 1984, under the name of "El Escorial, monastery and site".

The site also enjoys protection on Spain's heritage register; since June 21, 2006, it has been protected by the Community of Madrid as a Property of Cultural Interest.

San Lorenzo de El Escorial is located on the southern slopes of the Mount Abantos (elevation 1753 m). The average altitude of the municipality is 1,032 metres (3,386 ft), and most of the urban area is above 1,000 metres (3,300 ft). The hamlet initially sprang up around Monastery of El Escorial, gradually extending up the mountain. In the 20th and 21st centuries, the town underwent a strong urban expansion, particularly towards the southeastern side of Mount Abantos.

== Geography ==
=== Elevation and hydrography ===
The township's average altitude is 1,032 metres (3,386 ft). Most of the town is situated at about 1,000 metres (3,300 ft) above sea level, including the Monastery of El Escorial, which lies approximately 28 metres (92 ft) above the town. The highest part is the top of Mount Abantos, which is 1,753 metres (5,751 ft) above sea level.

The town covers a total area of 56.4 square kilometres (21.8 sq mi), most of which is mountainous terrain. In the south of the municipality is the Circo de El Escorial, bordered by the southern slopes of Mount Abantos to the south and the Las Machotas hills to the north. North, along the slope of Cuelgamuros, lies the Valle de los Caídos (Valley of the Fallen), near the border with Guadarrama. Towards the Southwest, the municipality extends down to El Escorial by the parks and gardens of the Casita del Príncipe.

San Lorenzo de El Escorial lies in the watershed of the Guadarrama river. The Aulencia river, born in Las Machotas, is the main tributary of the Guadarrama, after crossing the neighbouring village of El Escorial. The streams include small reservoirs.

=== Vegetation ===
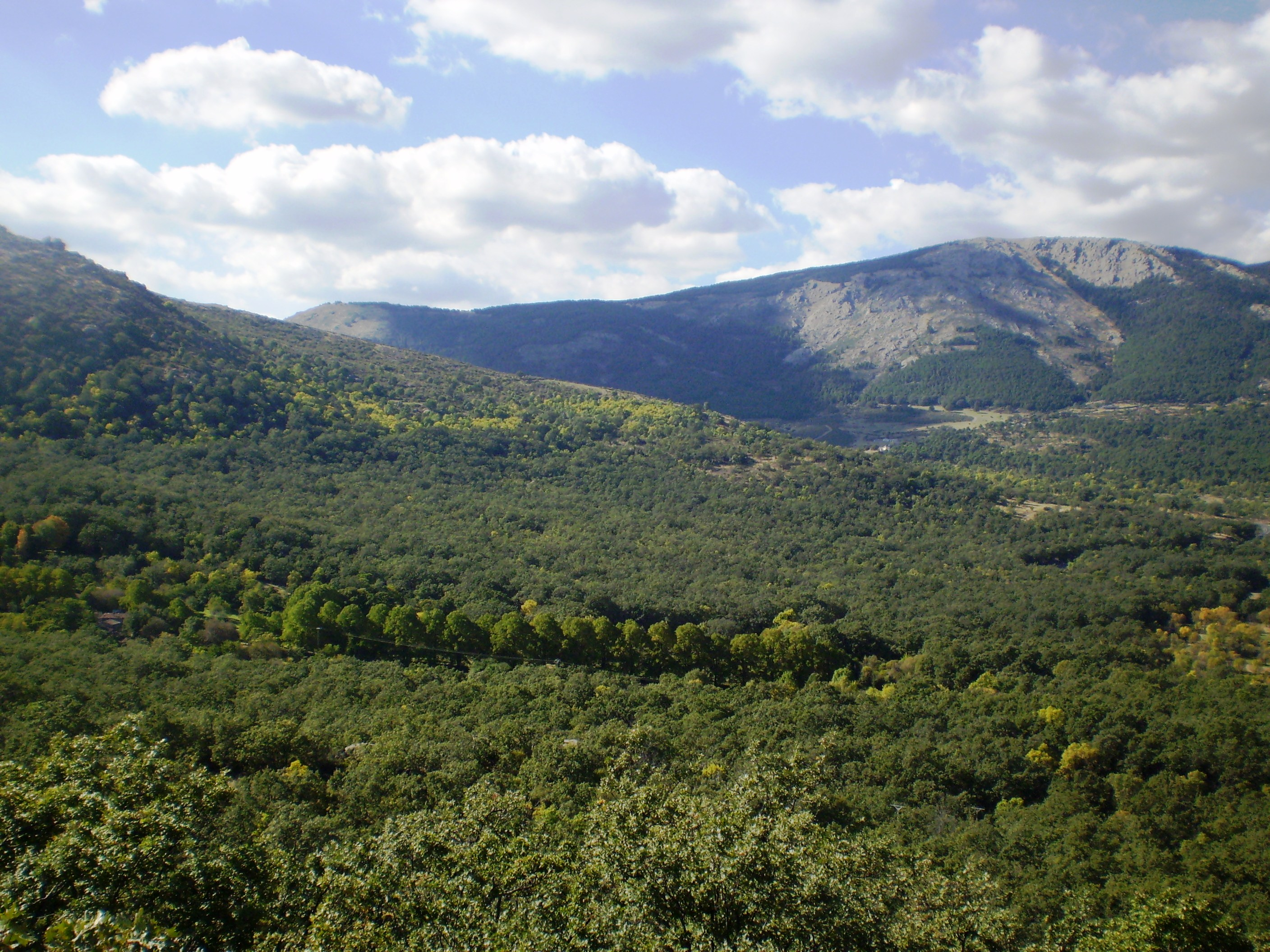
La Herrería forest located at the foot of Mount Abantos

The types of vegetation differ due to the municipality's fluctuation in altitude. In its lower altitudes, about 3,000 ft (910 m), there are pastures with narrow-leafed ash (Fraxinus angustifolia); and in the forest of La Herrería grow Pyrenean oaks (Quercus pyrenaica), sweet chestnuts (Castanea sativa) and Montpellier maples (Acer monspessulanum).

In the higher altitudes (1,000–1,200 m or 3,300–3,900 ft) appear maritime (Pinus pinaster) and stone pines (Pinus pinea), as well as holm oaks (Quercus ilex), prickly junipers (Juniperus oxycedrus) and labdanum (Cistus ladanifer). Up to 4,000 feet (1,200 m) grows Scots pine (Pinus sylvestris) and black pine (Pinus nigra).

San Lorenzo de El Escorial also has some allochthonous in its mountain areas, plant species as beech (American beech), cedars, larches, Lawson cypresses (Chamaecyparis lawsoniana), and sycamores (Acer pseudoplatanus). Students of a forestry school planted these trees during the early 20th century.

There are also trees of historical significance, including giant sequoias (Sequoiadendron giganteum), planted in the 18th century in the parks and gardens of the Casita del Príncipe.

Much of the municipality is contained within the "Abantos pine forest" and the Herrería zone, a protected nature area since 1961 and extends to an area that San Lorenzo de El Escorial shares with Santa María de la Alameda.

The center of environmental education Arboreto Luis Ceballos houses a collection of over 200 species of trees and bushes native to the Iberian Peninsula and Balearic Islands.

== History ==
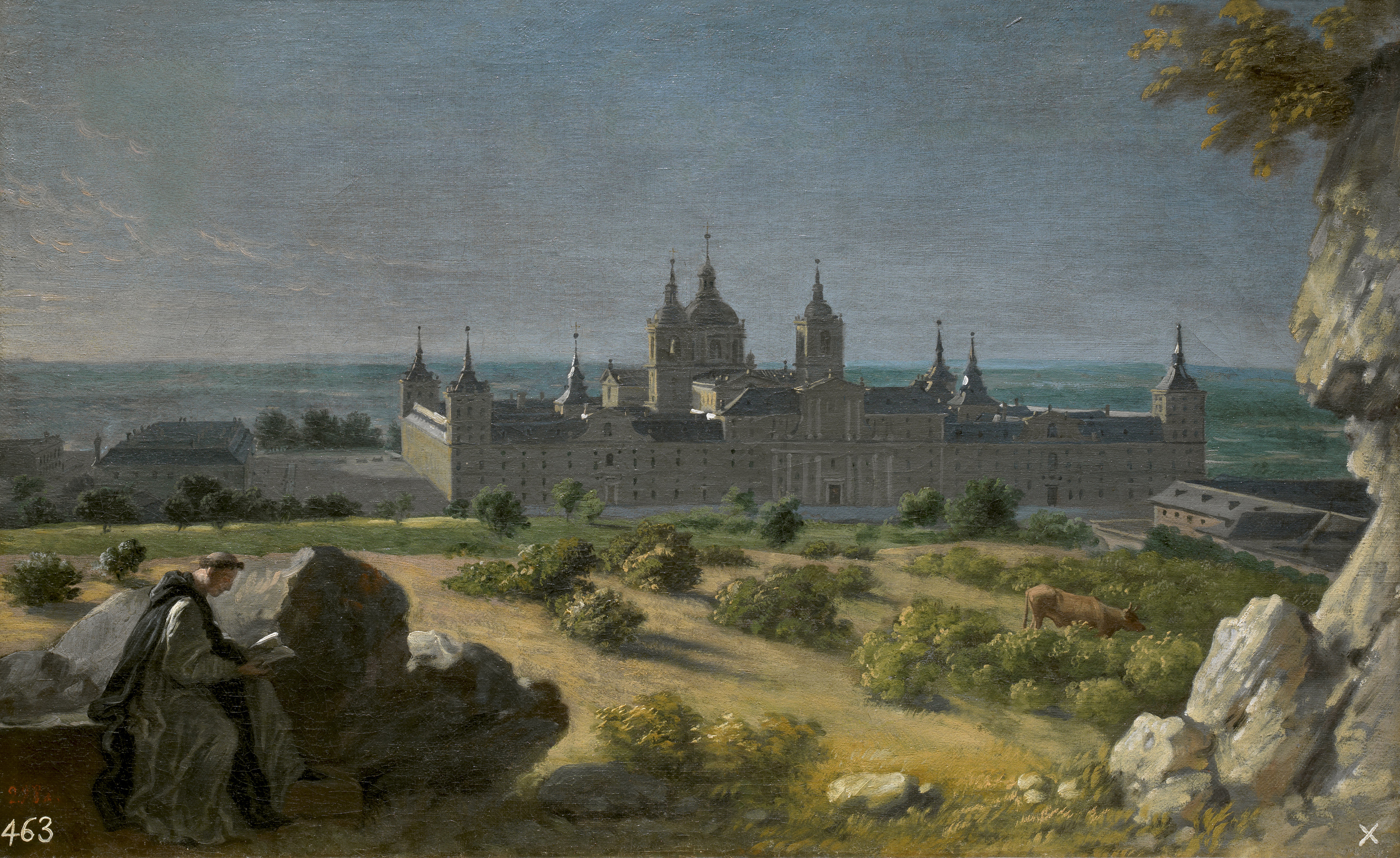
The Monastery of El Escorial was built in the 16th century. Two centuries later the town emerged in the vicinity of the building, which resulted, in the 19th century, in the current municipality.

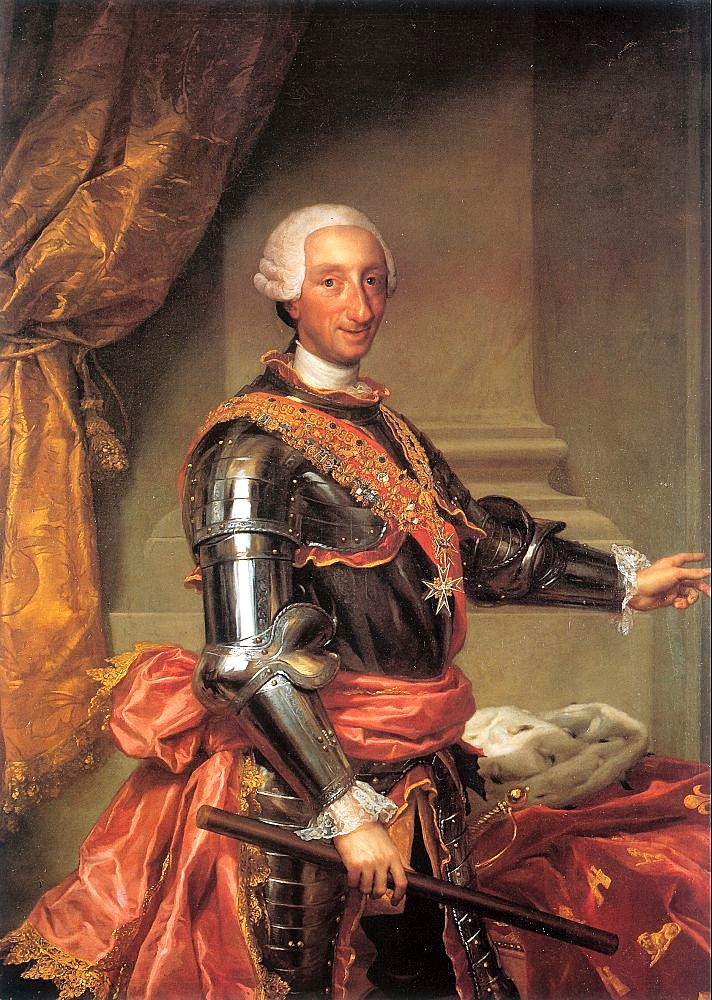
Charles III of Spain promoted a new territorial and administrative organization in the area, which was the origin of the current municipality of San Lorenzo de El Escorial.

The history of San Lorenzo de El Escorial is inexorably linked to the construction of the monastery and the town named El Escorial. The first historical references of this building date year 1558 where Philip II of Spain appointed a commission to find a proper place for the site, architects, doctors and quarrymen, among other guilds.

The hamlet of El Escorial met physical conditions for carrying out such company. Its abundance of forests, quarries and game reserves, the quality of its water and its place in the geographic center of Spain, at the foot of Mount Abantos, were determining factors for the final choice, which took place in 1561.

Builders placed the first stone of the monastery on April 23, 1563. A year earlier, Philip II began efforts to acquire the land adjacent to the site of the future monastery, with the intention of creating a territory of realengo, Royal Site of El Escorial, intended for agriculture, fishing, hunting and recreational uses. Among them were the meadow (Dehesa) of the ironworks of Fuentelámparas (today called La Herrería), located in the current term of San Lorenzo de El Escorial, and La Granjilla de La Fresneda de El Escorial, farms in the neighbouring village of El Escorial.

Construction lasted 21 years, which transformed the urban and social environment of El Escorial. The hamlet became a villa in 1565. A Lord Mayor exercised rule over the villa. The Lord Mayor's authority did not extend to the game reserves that the Crown managed directly, nor to agricultural uses managed by the monastery's Prior.

Through two papal bulls issued dated 1585 and 1586, the Roman Catholic Church removed the monastery from the control of the powerful Archbishop of Toledo and placed it under the monastery's Prior.

This administrative structure remained well into the 18th century, when the monarch Carlos III imposed a new territorial and administrative framework. The construction of houses, expressly prohibited in the outskirts of the monastery, was the cause of a dispute that faced the municipal authorities, who promoted a modification of the rules, and those who sought to restrict new construction. The subject was particularly delicate in those days, given the frequent visits of the royal family to the site; these visits led to an increase in demand for land to build houses and support buildings mainly for civil servants working in the royal household.

The resolution of the conflict came from King Carlos III, who, on May 3, 1767, authorized housing next to the market of the monastery, which was the birth of the municipality of San Lorenzo de El Escorial and the beginning of a process which culminated in the emancipation of the town from El Escorial. The development of this new hamlet was very fast, reaching a population of more than a thousand only a few years after Carlos III allowed the town's expansion.

The new settlement emerging at the foot of the monastery did not achieve self-rule until much later. The administrative structure designed by Philip II was blurring, first with the appointment of a governor by Carlos III—detrimental to the powers of the Lord Mayor and El Escorial's Prior—and, subsequently, with the privatization of land.

This was key to the structural development of the current municipality of San Lorenzo de El Escorial, since this privatization extended over most of the royal lands except for the Herrería farms, land surrounding the monastery, the Prince's Cottage and the Infant's Cottage.

On September 26, 1836, San Lorenzo de El Escorial became an independent municipality. In 1887, it elected its first mayor. To date, 22 people have served in this role.

During the Spanish Civil War (1936–1939), the people remained loyal to the Republican government and briefly changed the town's name to El Escorial of the Sierra.

Today the city of San Lorenzo de El Escorial consists of 12 localities: Colmenar del Arroyo, Colmenarejo, El Escorial, Fresnedillas de la Oliva, Navalagamella, Robledo de Chavela, Santa María de la Alameda, Valdemaqueda, Valdemorillo, Villanueva del Pardillo and Zarzalejo, and the monastery of San Lorenzo de El Escorial.

== Demography ==
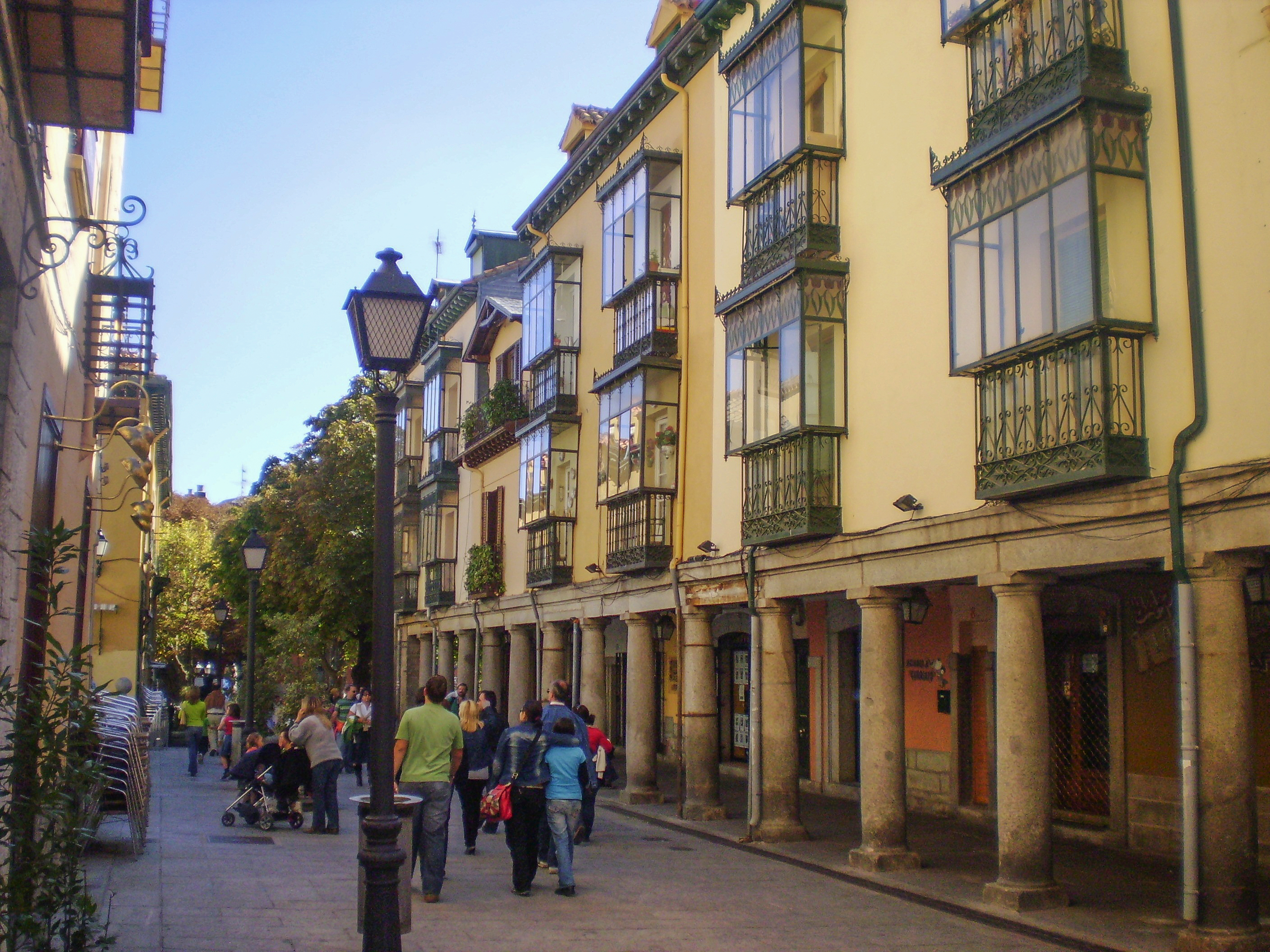
Queen Victoria Street, in the historical center.

San Lorenzo de El Escorial had 17,346 inhabitants, according to the National Institute of statistics (INE), as of 2008. At that time It had a population density of 307.55 inhabitants/square km (796.55 inhabitants/square mile), similar to other municipalities like El Escorial, but much lower than the regional average of the Comunidad de Madrid (808.17 inhabitants/square km (2,093.16 inhabitants/square mile)). The density was more than three times the Spanish average of 94.06 inhabitants/square km (243.62 inhabitants/square mile).

The area is culturally diverse, with large numbers of Moroccan and Latin American immigrants.

As of 2006, 51.7% of San Lorentinos were women and the remaining 48.3% were men. Foreigners represent 10.07% of the total population. The average age was 37.8 years. The annual population growth was 4.2%.

The transient population of San Lorenzo de El Escorial is very high. This is a major residential site; second homes proliferated with usage during weekends and vacation periods. In addition, the municipality receives daily large numbers of tourists attracted by its historical and natural heritage.

Population developments of San Lorenzo de El Escorial
1996	1998	1999	2000	2001	2002	2003	2004	2005	2006	2007	2008	2022
10,828	10,995	11,350	11,783	12,455	13,164	14,358	14,971	14,364	16,005	16,531	17,346	18,423

Note: 1996 figures are referring to May 1 and the other to January 1. Source: INE

== Economy ==
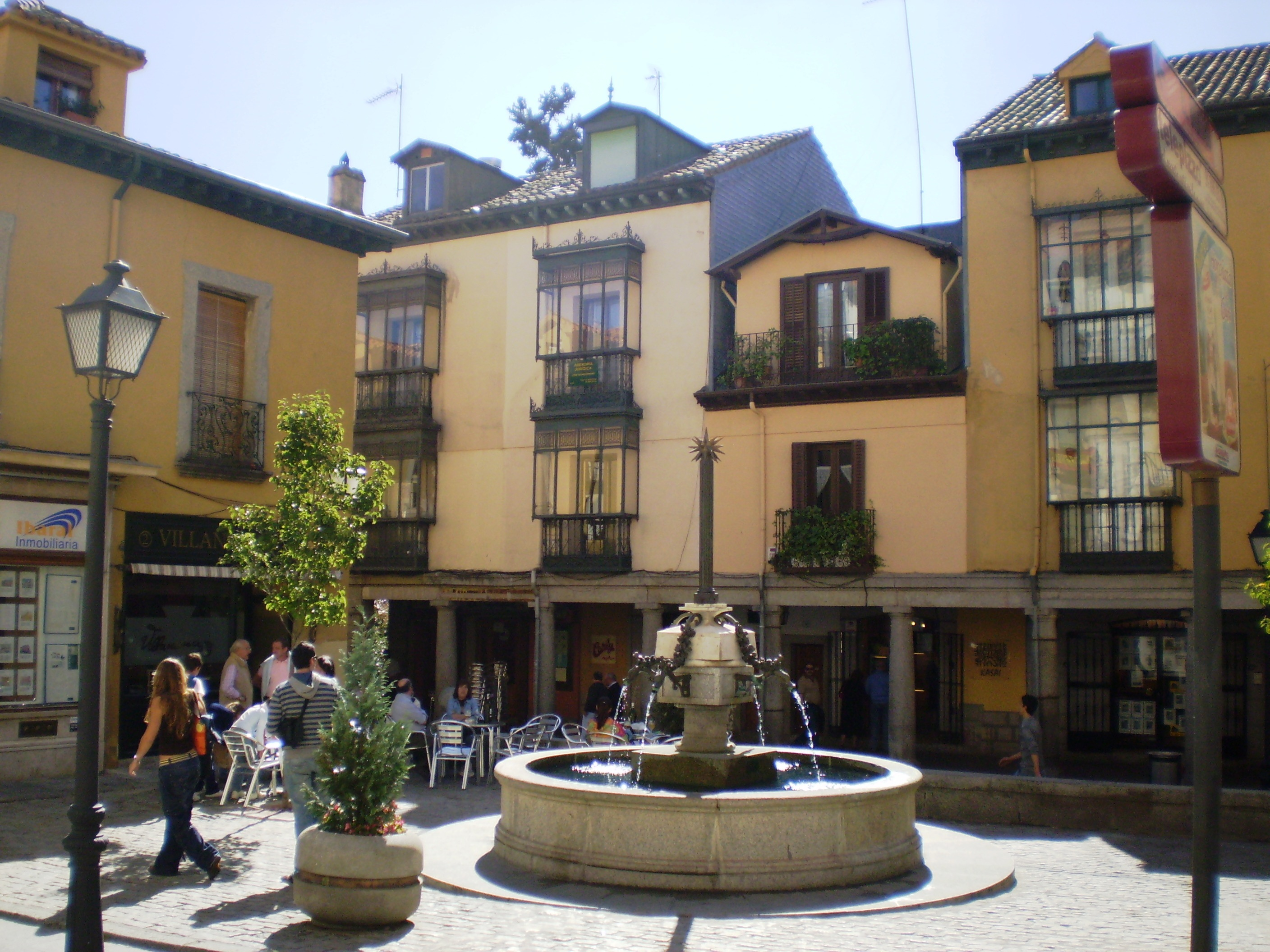
Plaza de la Cruz, one of the corners of the historical center

Tourism, hospitality and trade are the main economic activities of San Lorenzo de El Escorial. The municipality is one of the most important tourist destinations in the community of Madrid. Visitors usually make day trips with Madrid tourism as a starting point. The number of tourists staying overnight are insignificant as in other historical cities in the region, such as Alcalá de Henares, Aranjuez or Chinchón.

In recent years, the town has attempted to consolidate hotel tourism, trade fairs, conventions and cultural and educational nature courses. The Universidad Complutense holds summer courses to promote San Lorenzo de El Escorial as a Euroforum installations. The municipality has 10 hotels with a total of 611 rooms (year 2006).

Inside of this municipality are two of the most visited monuments in the nation national. The Monastery of El Escorial is the second most visited monument with highest number of visits (504,238 tourists 2004), short of the Royal Palace of Madrid (720,710 in the same year). The Valley of the Fallen, located on the outskirts of town, is the third in the national list (407,578).

Construction is another economic activity on the rise in San Lorenzo de El Escorial. Although much of its area is protected, as with the Herrería forests, the town has experienced strong urban growth in recent years, with the creation of new housing developments in areas that lack legal protection from development. This is the case of the southeastern slope of Mount Abantos, which has many newly constructed neighbourhoods, especially after the August 21, 1999, fire that burned 450 acres (1.8 km^{2}) of pine.

== Main sights ==
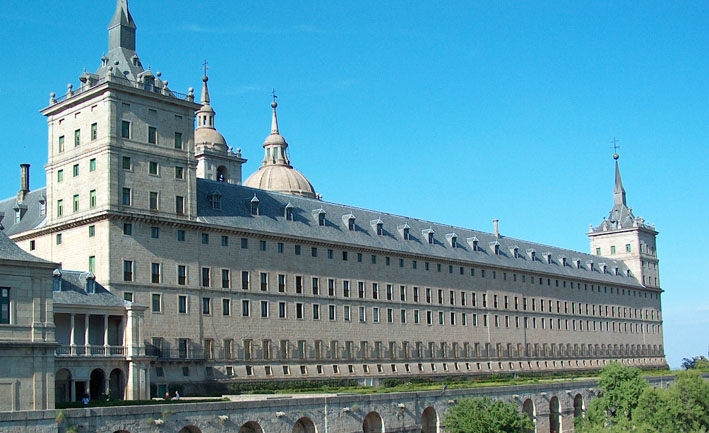
Monastery of El Escorial

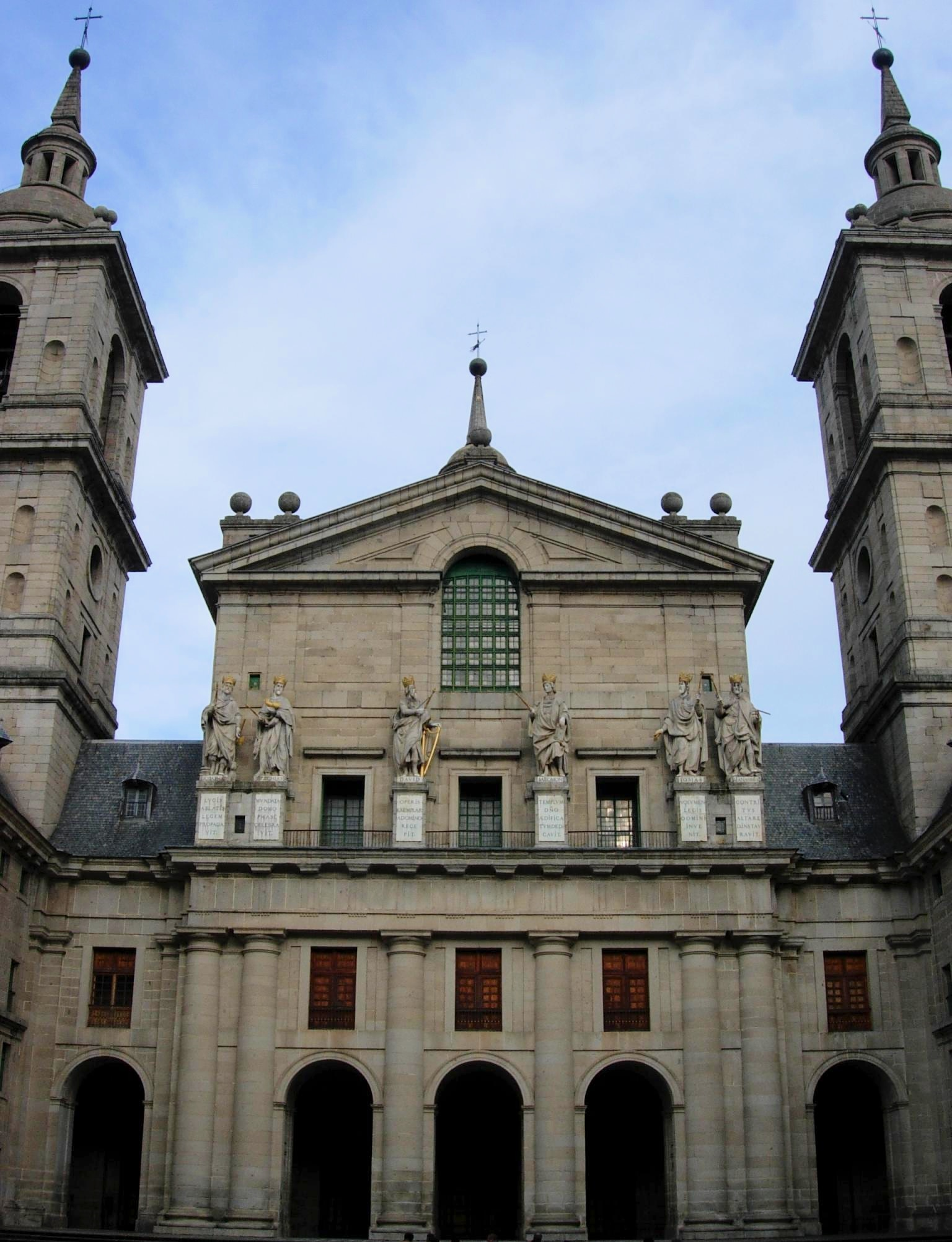
Basilica of the Escorial of the Monastery of El Escorial

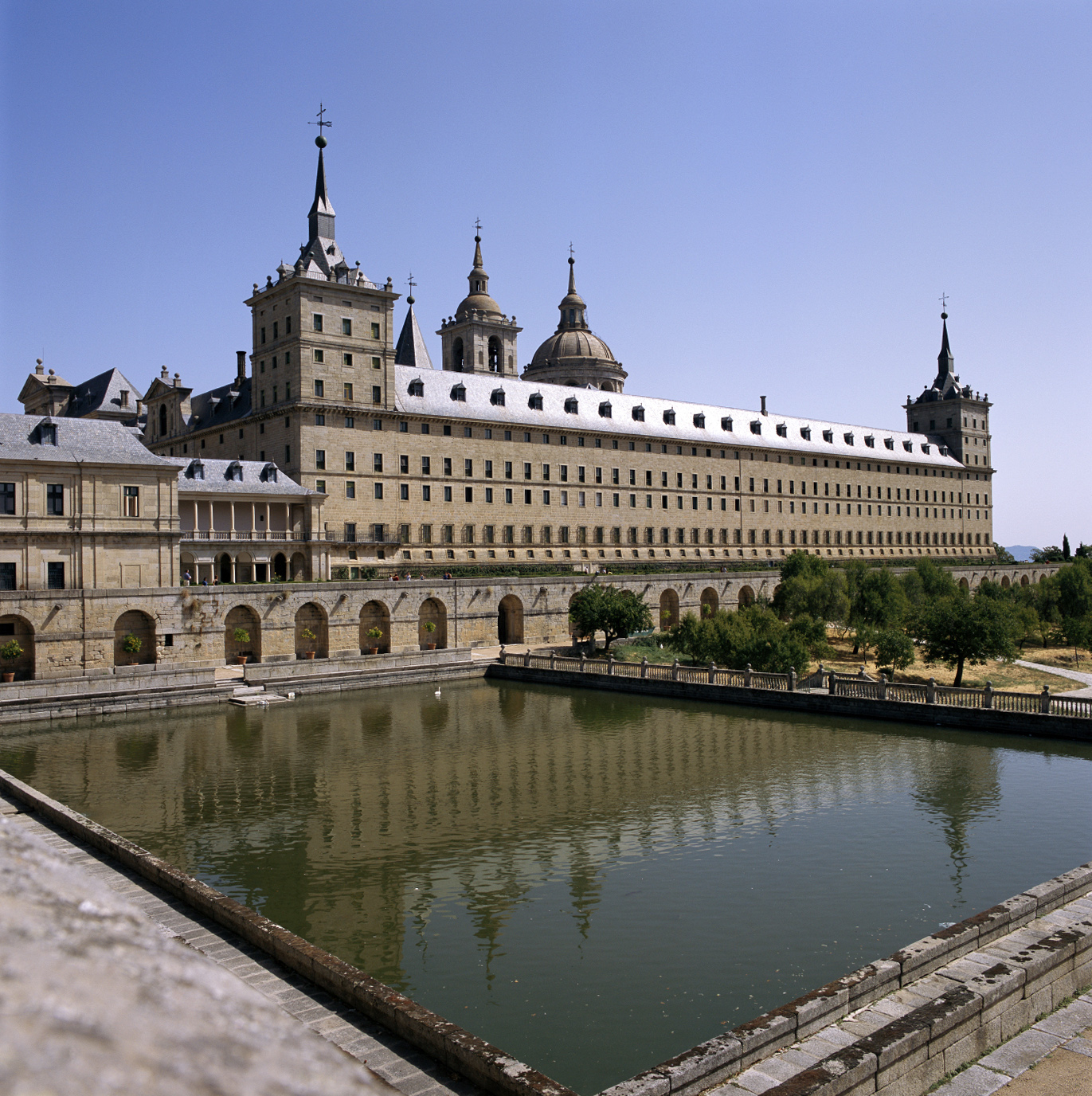
Monastery and Site of El Escorial

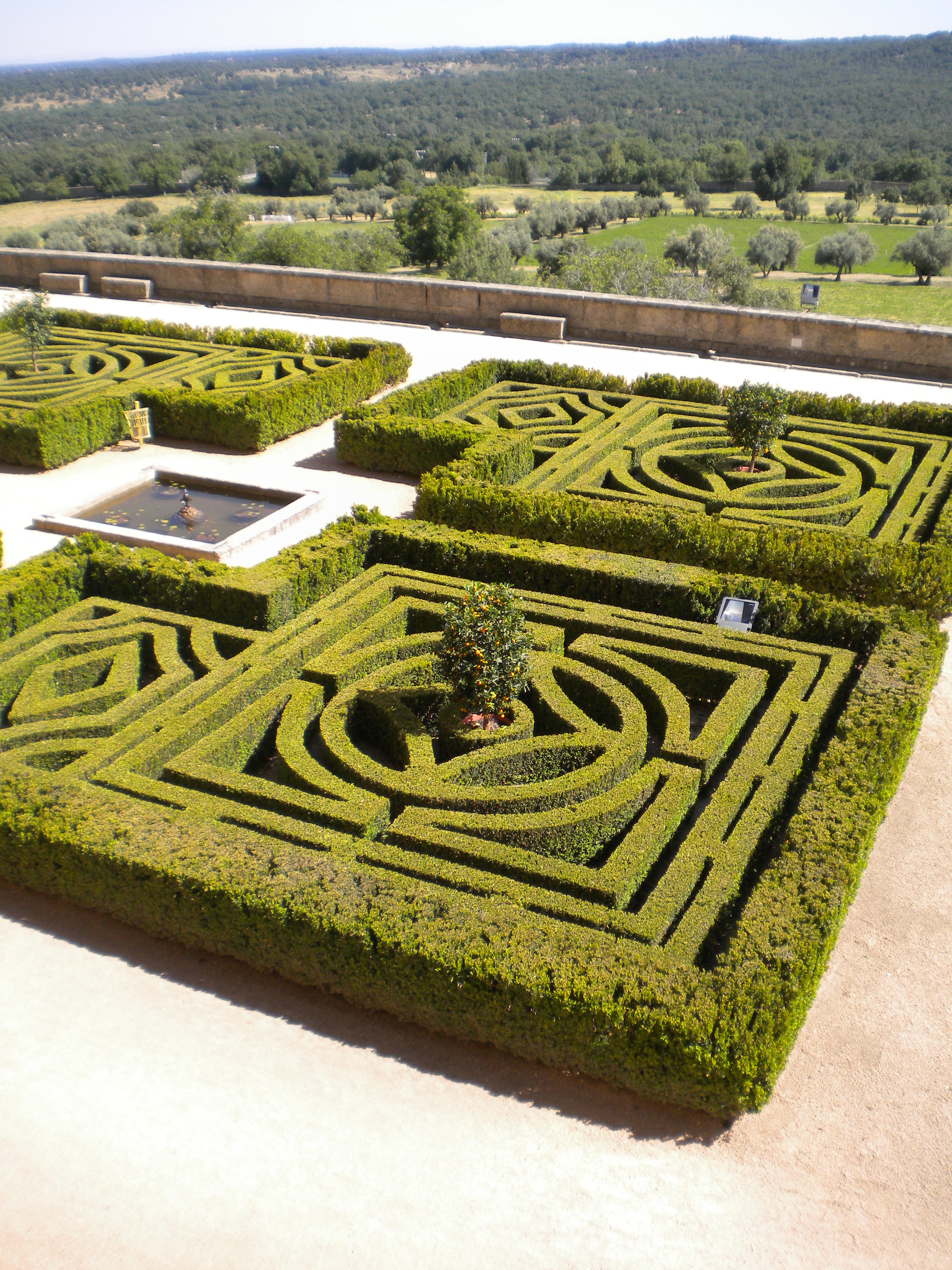
El Escorial, Spain

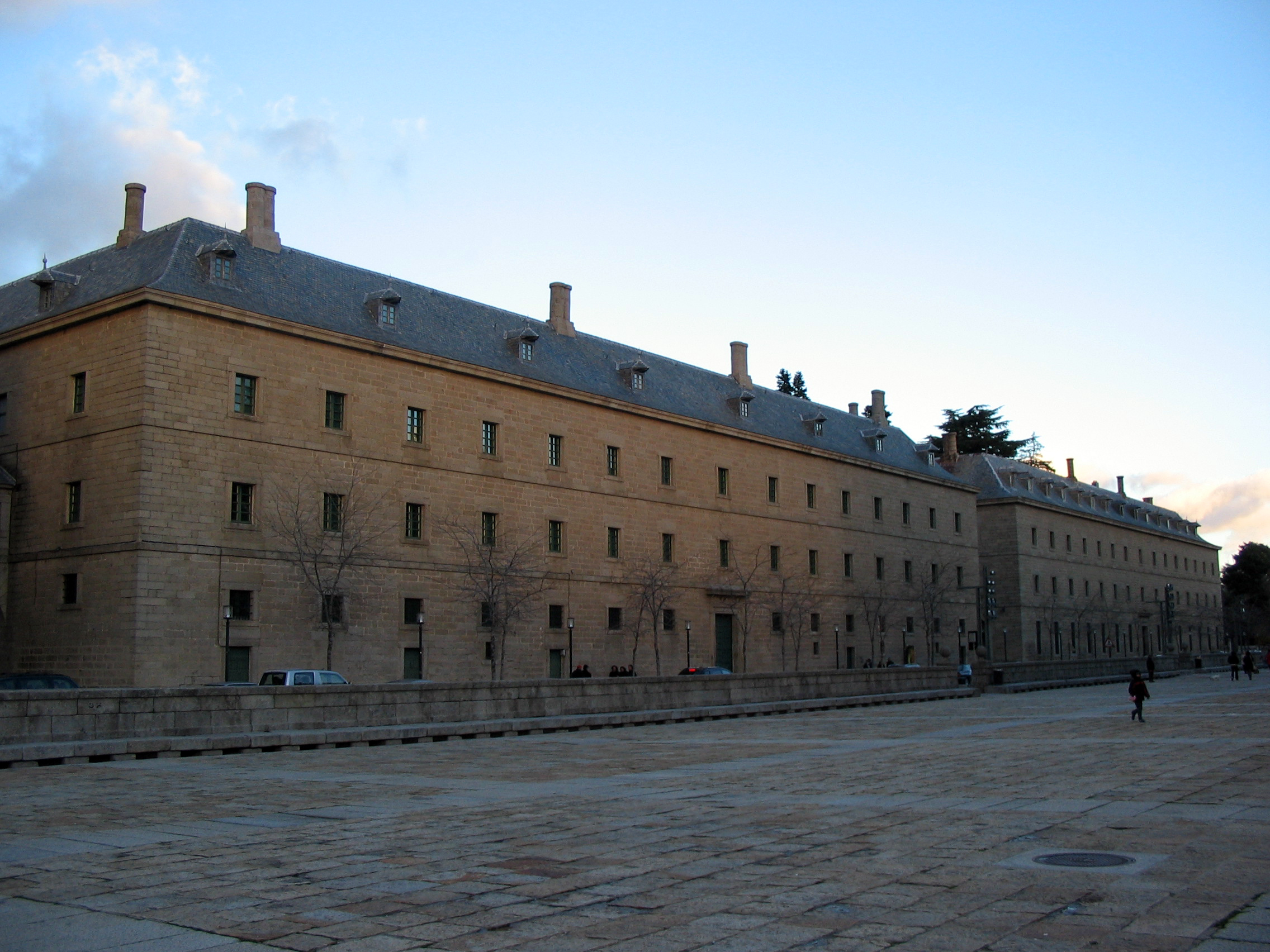
Trading houses in the market of the Monastery of El Escorial built by Juan de Herrera

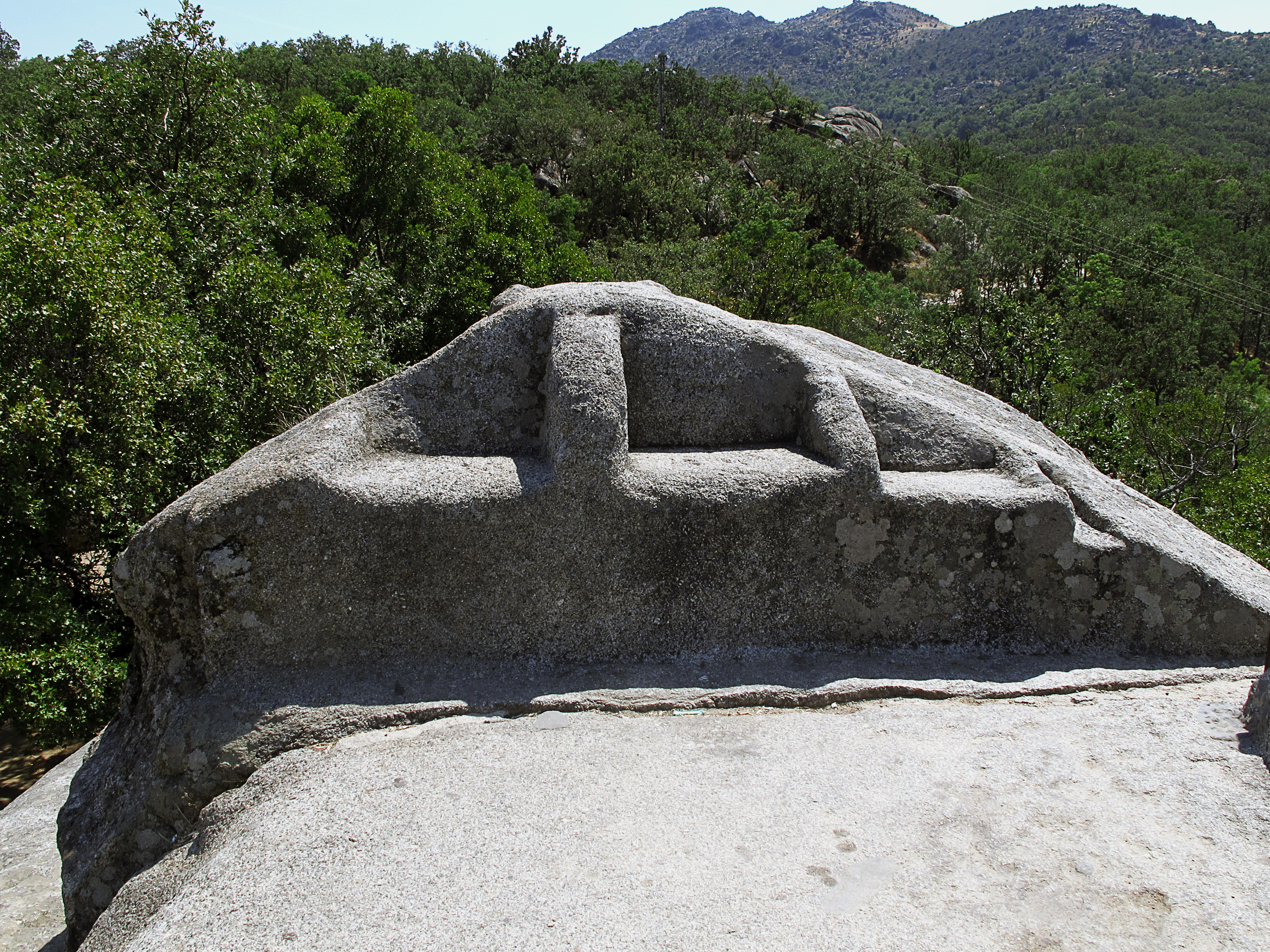
The Seat of Philip II could have a pre-Roman source.

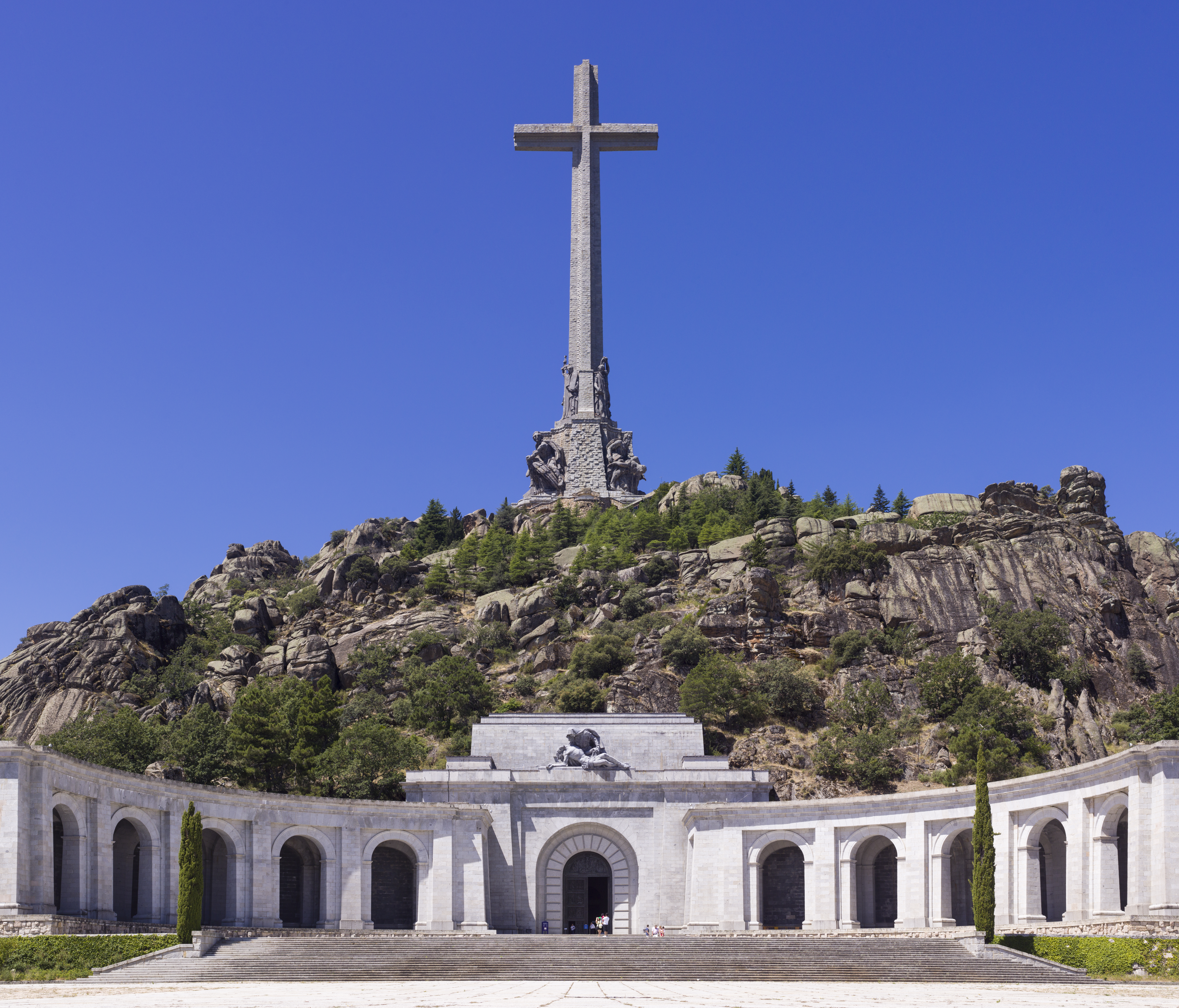
The Valley of the Fallen is the third most visited monument in Spain.

The town has an important historical-artistic, urban and cultural heritage, a result of its link with the Spanish crown. It adds relevant ecological, geological and archaeological values.

Part of the monument is listed with the heritage list of UNESCO. In addition, this site has been awarded bien de Interés Cultural, in the category of historical sites, with the name of "Escorial: monastery, natural and cultural environment", from the community of Madrid.

The last legal figure, approved by Decree 52/2006 (June 21), also includes the towns of El Escorial, Zarzalejo and Santa María de la Alameda. This is the area which was within the so-called domain of Philip II, with which the monarch delineated the perimeter of the royal site in the area around the Monasterio.

=== World Heritage sites ===
On November 2, 1984, during the quadricentennial of the placement of the last stone of the monastery's construction, the UNESCO World Heritage Committee, meeting in Buenos Aires, Argentina, added "El Escorial, monastery and site" to the UNESCO World Heritage List. The List defines territorial protection for the Monasterio de El Escorial, the Casita of Infante (or upper palace), and the Casita del Principe (or lower palace) at El Escorial.

This building, one of the main Renaissance monuments in Spain, was erected in the last third of the 16th century on Mount Abantos at the height of 1,028 m (3,373 ft). Juan Bautista de Toledo began work on the project, but it was finished after his death by Juan de Herrera, who imposed a new architectural style. The site occupies an area of 33,327 m² (358,829 square feet) and has 16 patios, 88 sources, 13 oratorios, 15 cloisters, 86 stairs, 9 towers, 1,200 doors and 2,673 windows. Its main façade is 207 metres (679 ft) in length. The most important parts of the building include the Pantheon of Kings, the Basilica of the Escorial and the Royal Library. From the sixteenth century onward, the Escorial monastery has been described as "the eighth wonder of the world".

The Príncipe and Infante cottages are two 18th century neoclassical mansions. Both were built by Juan de Villanueva as recreation sites for Carlos IV, then Prince of Asturias, and his brother Infante Gabriel of Spain, respectively.

The protected area set aside in the UNESCO World Heritage List is currently in the process of being enlarged. The Spanish authorities intend to extend the UNESCO heritage declaration to the entire area that was included within Philip II's original decree.

=== Historical site ===
The municipality of San Lorenzo de El Escorial and other historical-artistic groups have been incorporated into the legal definition of the historical site "El Escorial: monastery, site and natural and cultural environment", according to Decree 52/2006 (June 21 BOCM) of the community of Madrid.

Within the El Escorial Historic Site are various buildings and natural enclaves located within its Township and elsewhere, including Zarzalejo and Santa María de la Alameda. Monumental sets and landscape sanlorentinos are highlighted below:

- Seat of Philip II, where, according to legend, sat the monarch to view the progress of the works of the monastery -- although it is currently believed that it was actually a religious altar of the ancient Vettones.
- The Herrería, historic farm, formerly known as the Dehesa of the Fuentelámparas Ironworks, is of great ecological interest. It is populated by ash and oak forests.
- Del Castañar, a historic farm with important environmental attractions.
- Casita Park, containing parks and gardens built in the neoclassical Stupinigi environment, is shared between the municipalities of El Escorial and San Lorenzo de El Escorial.
- Suites of offices: The first two were built by Juan de Herrera 16th century and the third, Juan de Villanueva was built in the 18th century. They are currently home to a small church and different facilities managed by the Town Council of San Lorenzo de El Escorial. This is the case of the House of culture of the municipal library, the tourist office, the Father Soler Professional Conservatory of Music, and the Royal Centre for integrated music and training in plastic arts. Additionally, the first suite of offices is the provisional headquarters of the Instituto de Estudios Herrerianos, which will host the legacy of the architect and investigator Luis Cervera Vera.
- Houses by Juan de Villanueva:
  - Casita del Infante
  - Casita del Príncipe
- The Royal Colosseum of Carlos III, built in the 18th century, and popularly known as the Bombonera Theatre.
- The company home, built in the 16th century by Mora Francisco, today serves as the headquarters of Maria Cristina University.
- The Valley of the Fallen, by extension, is included within the historical territory of the El Escorial monastery, site, and natural and cultural environment site. This memorial was built in the 20th century at the request of dictator Francisco Franco. It is perched on the Risco of Nava at 1.39m (4.56 ft) altitude, in the place known as Cuelgamuros. A 150 m (490 ft) cross marks the site, which consists of a basilica carved on stone, an abbey, and an inn. At the base of the cross, there are 18 m (59 ft) sculptures of the Evangelists by D'avalos John.

== Celebrities ==
San Lorenzo de El Escorial had close historical ties with the Spanish Crown, as place of residence and burial site of different monarchs from both Habsburg and Bourbon lines.

The presence of the Kings attracted different personalities from the world of culture and the arts towards the municipality. Apart from the long list of architects, sculptors and painters who participated in the 16th-century decoration of the El Escorial, the Girona musician Antonio Soler (Olot, 1729) died in San Lorenzo of El Escorial in 1783, where he had spent most of his career.

In the 19th and 20th centuries, the town became a residential suburb of Madrid, home to relevant political and cultural figures. Among these noteworthy figures are Serafín Alvarez and Joaquin Álvarez Quintero, comediógrafos who temporarily lived in the municipality.

Among children born in San Lorenzo de El Escorial in the 20th century, the poet Luis Felipe Vivanco (1907–1975), the architect Juan Herreros (1958) and the botanist Luis Ceballos y Fernández de Córdoba (1896–1967) are worthy of note.

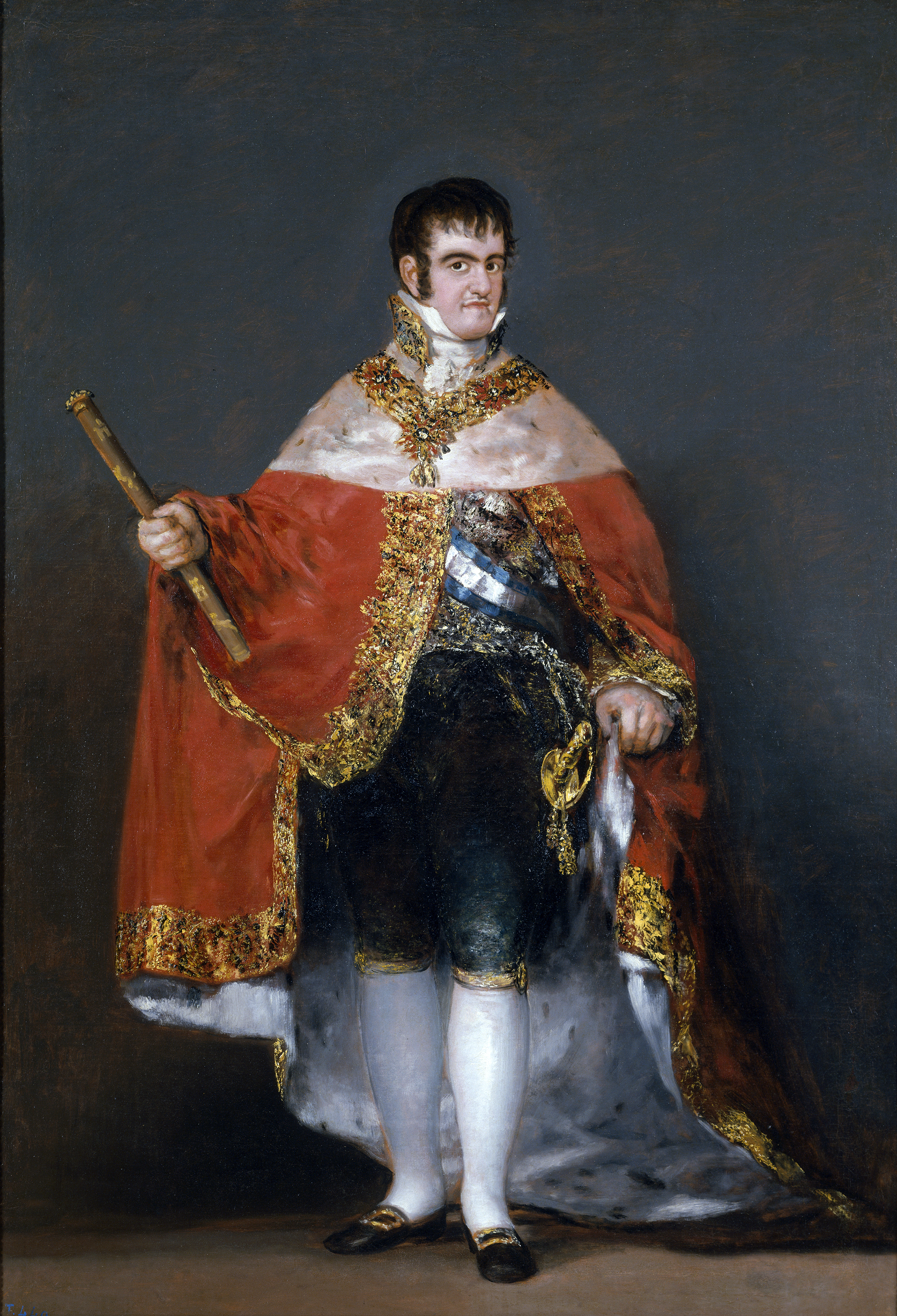
Portrait of Ferdinand VII of Spain in coronation robes Francisco Goya

== Festivals and traditions ==
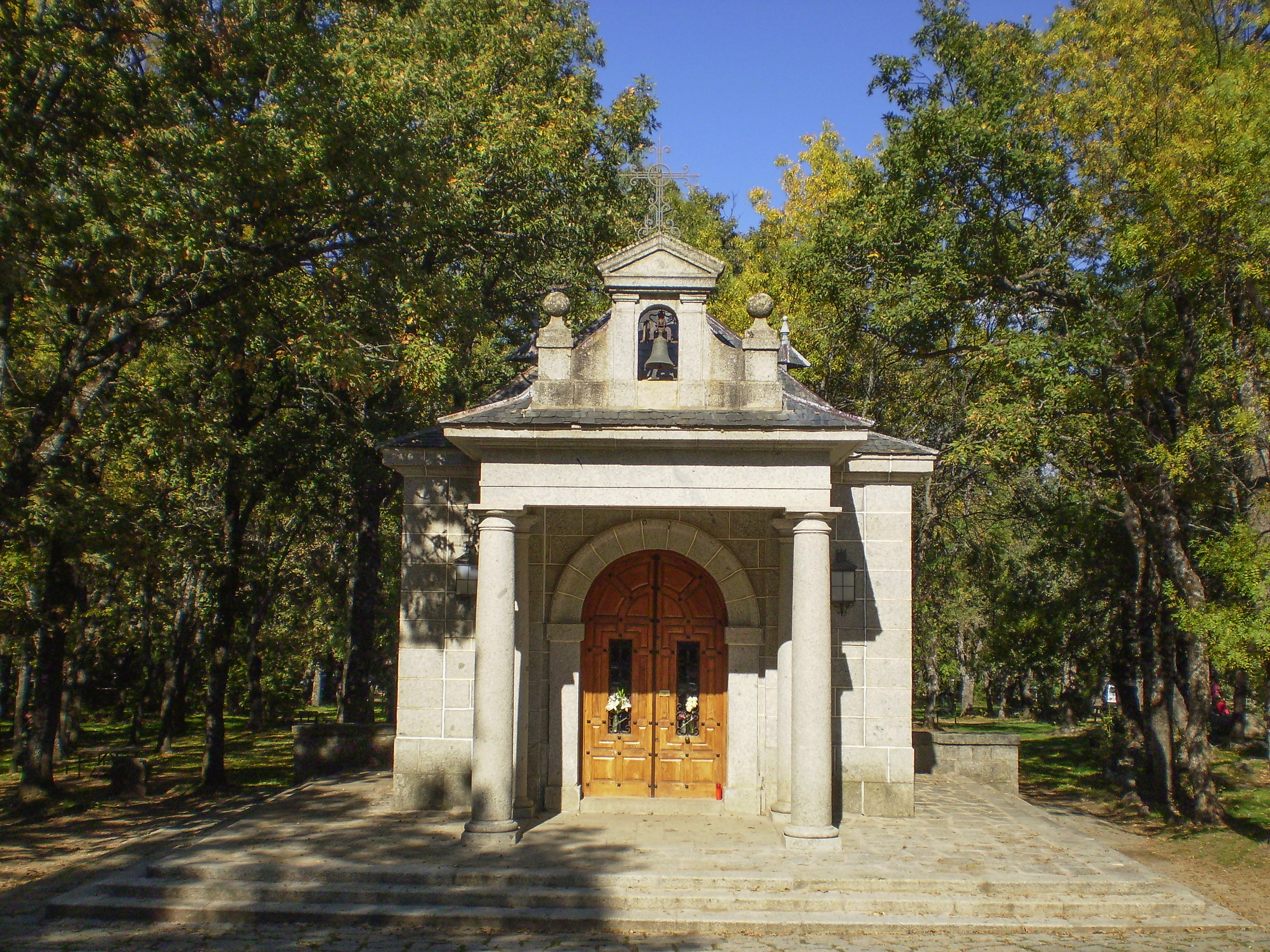
Chapel of the Virgen de Gracia, La Herrería.

The people of San Lorenzo hold their feasts on 10 August, the feast of Saint Lawrence, from which the municipality takes its name and to whom Philip II of Spain dedicated El Escorial — the building was constructed to commemorate Battle of St. Quentin, which took place on 10 August 1557.

The pilgrimage of Our Lady, the Virgin of Grace, is undoubtedly the most important tradition in San Lorenzo de El Escorial. Held at the beginning of September, it is one of the most significant religious events in Spain and has been designated a tourist attraction by the Community of Madrid since 1948.

Holy Week in San Lorenzo is an event in the Guadarrama region. At Christmastime, large crowds take to the streets to commemorate the Nativity of Christ in Bethlehem.

== Education ==
There are 5 crèches (2 public and 3 private), 2 public primary schools, 1 Institute of secondary education and 3 private schools (with and without concert) in San Lorenzo de El Escorial, as well as 1 overseas centre and 1 university centre attached to the Complutense University (University Maria Cristina).

== Notable people ==
- Felipe Diricksen (1590–1679), Baroque painter
- Ferdinand VII of Spain (1784–1833), King of Spain
- Luis Ceballos y Fernández de Córdoba (1896–1967), forester, former member of the Spanish Royal Academy of Sciences and the Royal Spanish Academy
- Juan Herreros (born 1956), architect
- Tristan Egolf (1971–2005), American novelist and political activist
- Carlos Verona (born 1992), cyclist
- Munir El Haddadi (born 1995), Spanish-Moroccan footballer

== See also ==
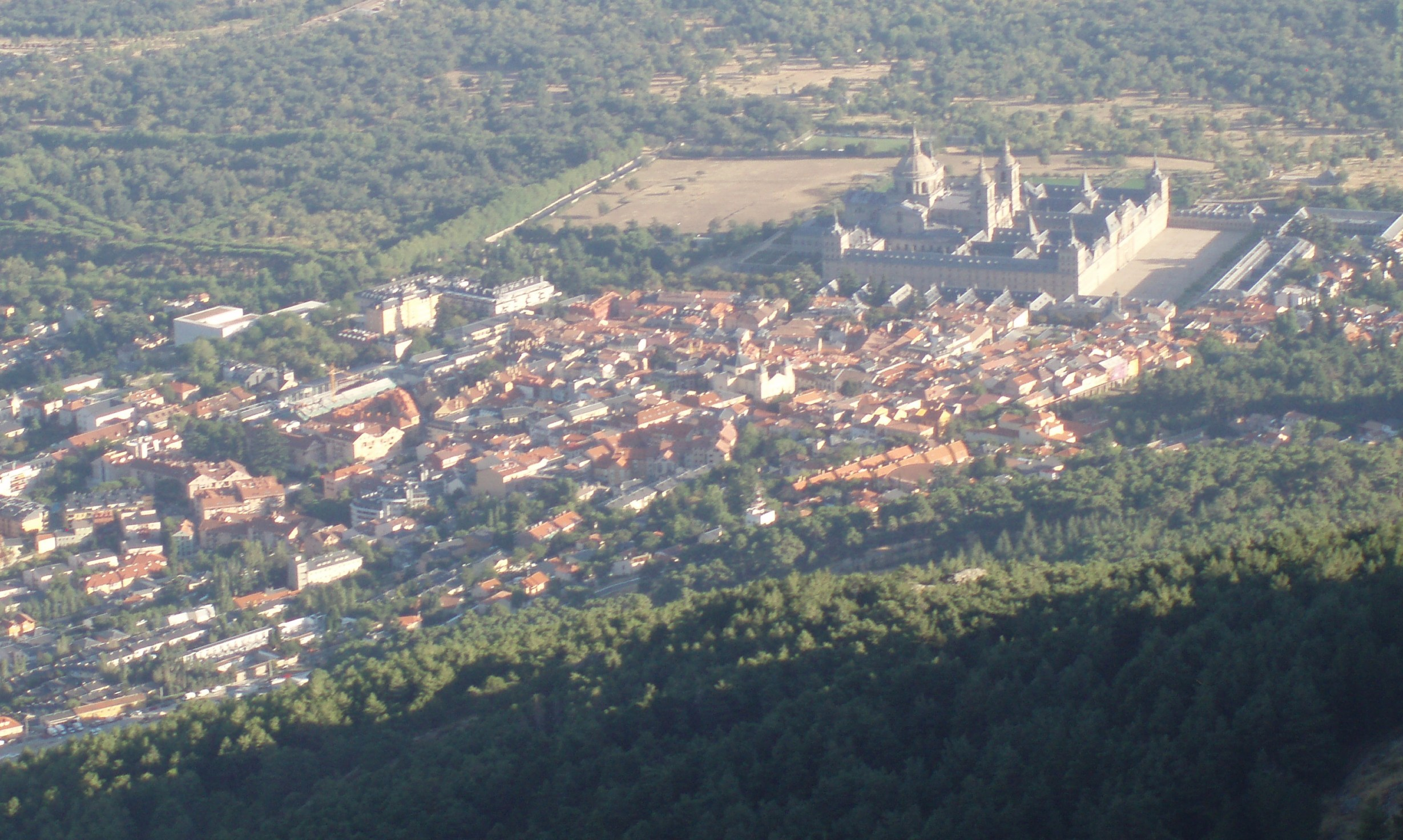
Central urban area of San Lorenzo de El Escorial, seen from the top of Mount Abantos

- Sierra de Guadarrama
- Valley of the Fallen
- Imperial Route of the Community of Madrid
