= Luis Ceballos =

Luis Ceballos may refer to:

- Luis Ceballos y Fernández de Córdoba (1896–1967), Spanish forest engineer and botanist
- Luis Ceballos (footballer), Chilean footballer
