= Dehesa de la Cepeda =

Exclave in central Spain

Coordinates: 40°40′N 4°17′W

Location of the Dehesa de la Cepeda enclave, in red next to the province of Segovia

Dehesa de la Cepeda is an exclave in central Spain.

Belonging to the municipality of Santa María de la Alameda in the Madrid region, it is entirely bordered by territory of Castile and León, embedded in between the provinces of Ávila and Segovia.

Dehesa de la Cepeda is mostly pasture land.

== See also ==
- Geography of Castile and León
