= Mount Abantos =

Mountain in the country of Spain

Abantos
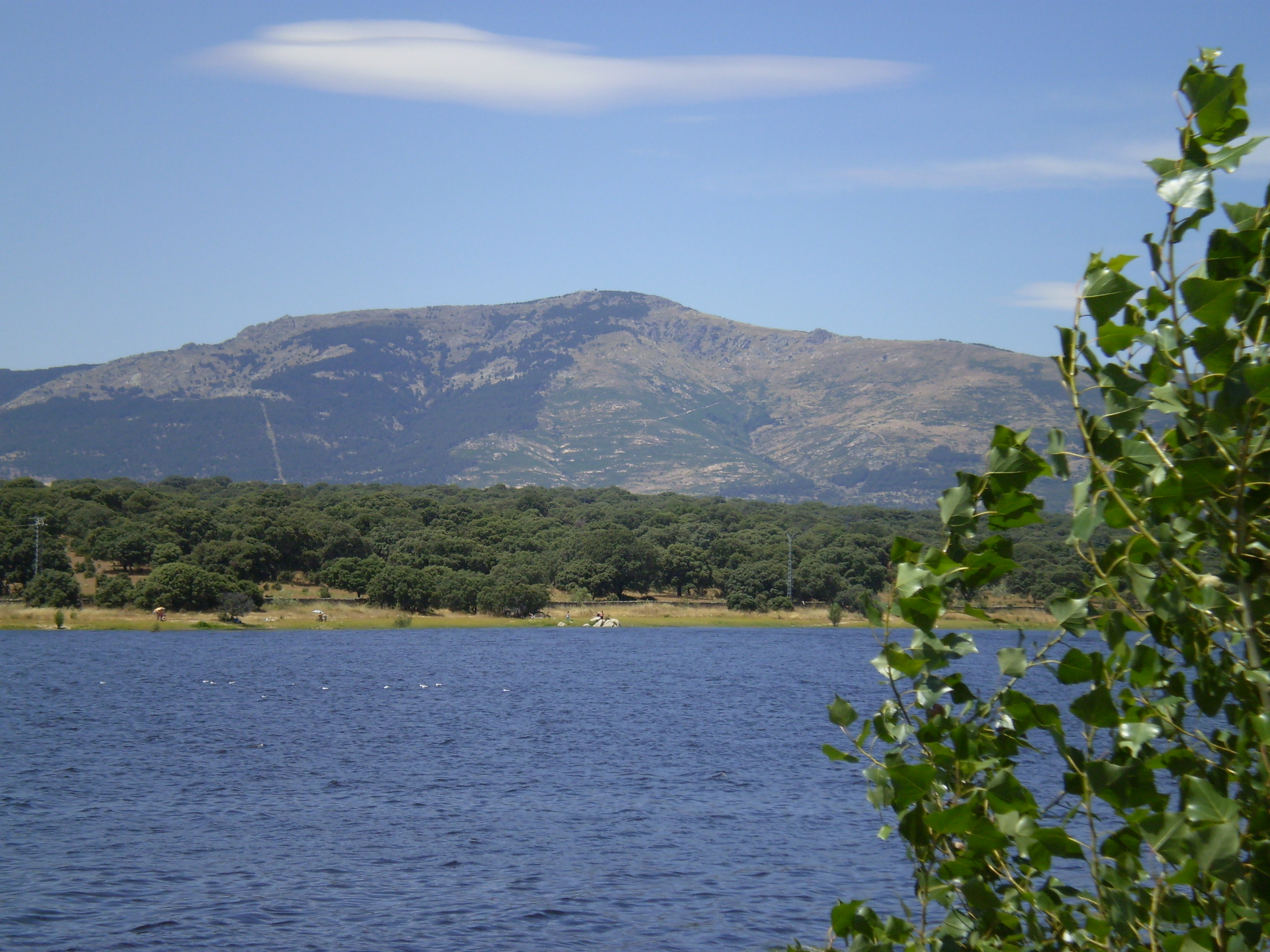
- The south eastern slope of Abantos viewed from the Valmayor Reservoir.

Highest point
- Elevation: 1,753 m (5,751 ft)
- Prominence: 227 m (745 ft)
- Coordinates: 40°37′N 4°09′W

Geography
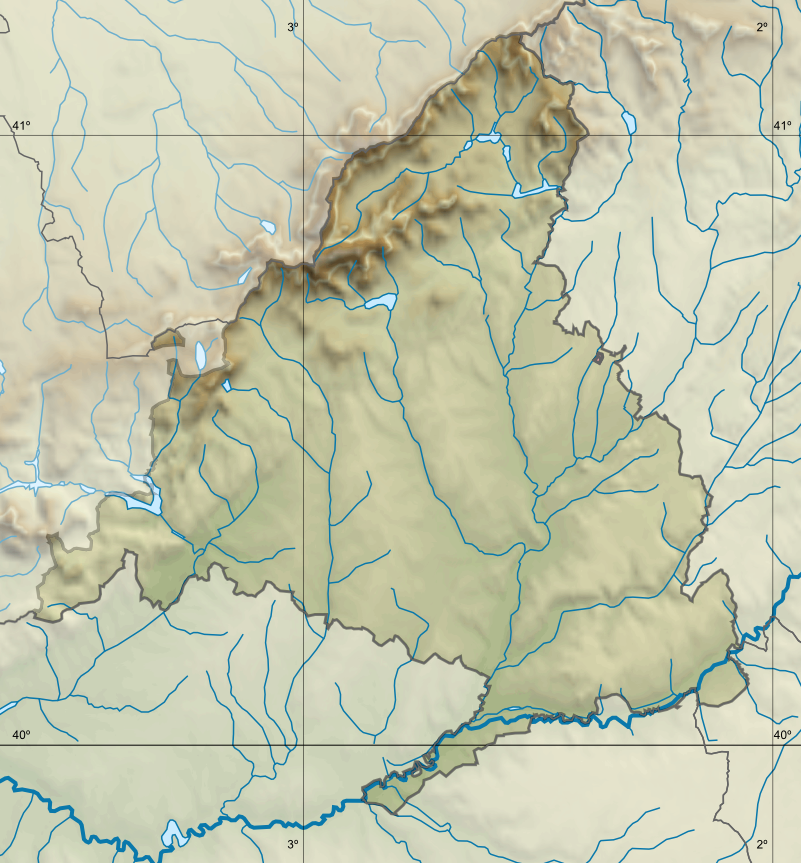
- Location within Community of Madrid
- Location: Community of Madrid and province of Ávila, Castile and León, Spain
- Parent range: Sierra de Guadarrama

Mount Abantos (Spanish: Monte Abantos) is a mountain in the Sierra de Guadarrama range in the Sistema Central of Spain, a chain that runs from east to west. For the most part, the mountain is located in the municipality of San Lorenzo de El Escorial in the Community of Madrid, with part of its west side in the province of Ávila.

== Geography ==
The mountain is one of the most prominent mountains in the Sierra de Guadarrama. It has a height of 1,753 metres (5,751 ft). The northern slope of Abantos lies in the Cuelgamuros valley.

A small part of the west side of the mountain lies in the province of Ávila (Castilla y León). The mountain has a smooth contour, and almost all of its slope is covered by pine trees, some of them repopulated. On the west side of Abantos is the port of Malagon, one of the toughest mountain stages of the Vuelta a España (Tour of Spain).

== Etymology ==
Mount Abantos takes its name from abanto, a name for various species of vultures such as the black vulture, the red buzzard, the griffon vulture or African vulture, which can sometimes be seen flying on the mountain. During the reign of King Philip II, the mountain was also known as Buen Monte del Oso (lit. Good Bear Mountain) because of the abundance of big game species. At the top of Abantos is a weather station and a yellow electromagnetic signal reflector panel.

== Natural Protection ==
Abantos is protected by the Community of Madrid, through its inclusion in Paraje Pintoresco del Pinar de Abantos y Zona de La Herrería, a natural reserve.

== History ==
In the 16th century, King Philip II of Spain chose a site on the southern side of Abantos as the site of the Monastery of El Escorial. In the 18th century, the municipality of San Lorenzo de El Escorial was founded. San Lorenzo de El Escorial is now an urban community with a population of over 17,000. On the mountain's northern side is another monument of historical and artistic interest, Valle de los Caídos ("Valley of the Fallen"). This monument was erected at Cuelgamuros Valley in the 20th century. The monument was conceived by caudillo Francisco Franco as a memorial to those who died during the Spanish Civil War.

On 21 August 1999, a forest fire began on the east side of Abantos, charring over 450 hectares of pine forest. The burned area has since been repopulated with pine trees.

The routes for many Vueltas a España have passed through Abantos, and the mountain has been the final stage for the race on numerous occasions

== See also ==
- Sierra de Guadarrama
- San Lorenzo de El Escorial
- Valle de los Caídos
