= Santa María de la Alameda =

Coordinates: 40°36′N 4°15′W

- Municipality
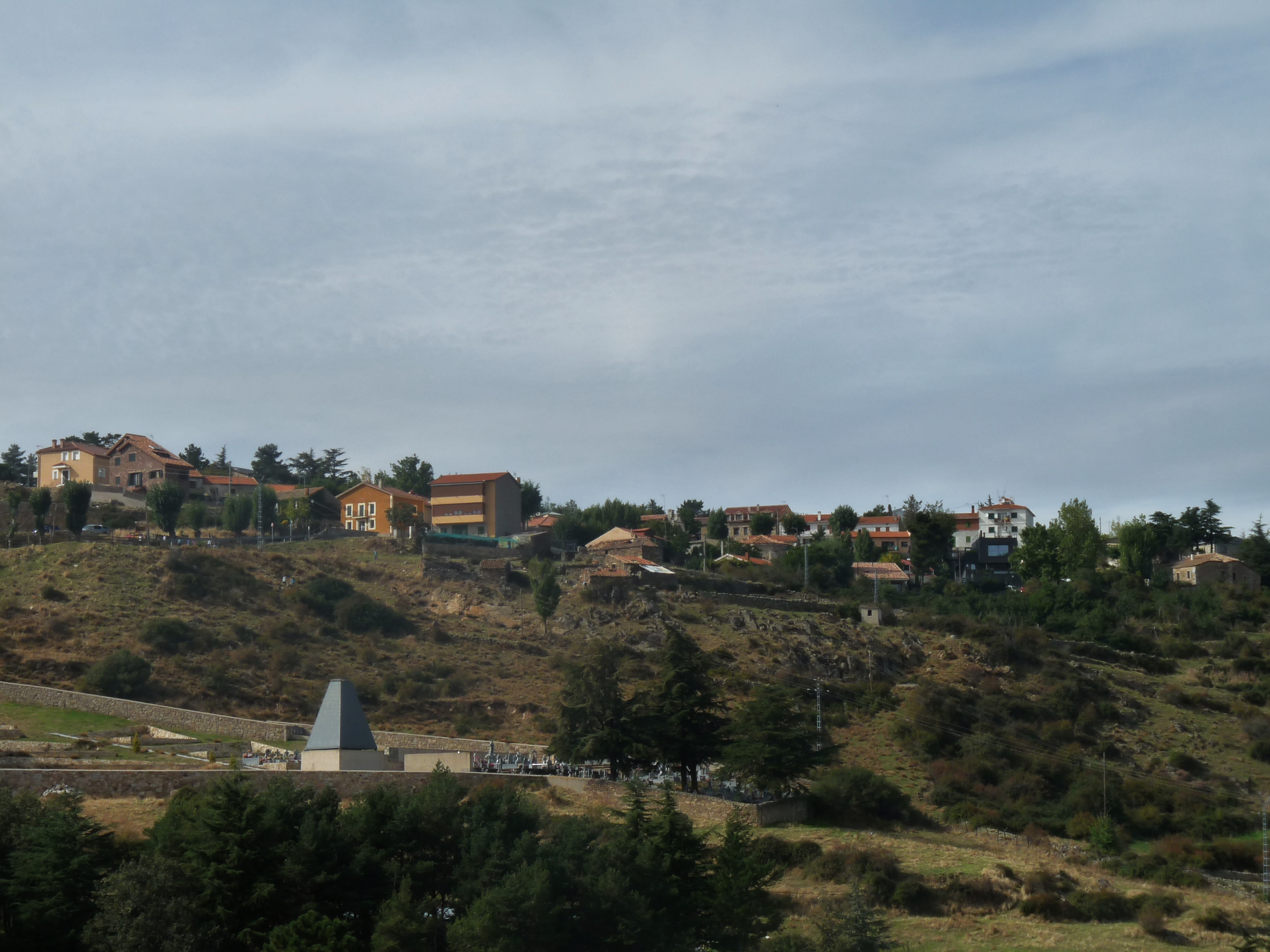

- Flag Coat of arms

- Country: Spain
- Region: Community of Madrid

Area
  - Total: 74.41 km^{2} (28.73 sq mi)
- Elevation: 1,409 m (4,623 ft)

Population (2025-01-01)
  - Total: 1,584
  - Density: 21.29/km^{2} (55.13/sq mi)
- Time zone: UTC+1 (CET)
  - Summer (DST): UTC+2 (CEST)

Santa María de la Alameda (Spanish pronunciation: [ˈsanta maˈɾi.a ðe la alaˈmeða]) is a municipality of the Community of Madrid, Spain. It is linked to the city of Madrid and the town of El Escorial by regular train services. A popular weekend and holiday destination, Santa Maria is popular with anglers, hunters, walkers and outdoors enthusiasts.

Originally a group of cattle-raising hamlets, the municipality comprises different settlements: Las Herreras, El Pimpollar, La Hoya, Navalespino, La Paradilla, Robledondo, Santa María de la Alameda and Santa María Estación. In time, the nucleus of "Santa María Estación", developed around the railway station, has grown to become the most populated settlement. The capital of the municipality (the namesake "Santa María de la Alameda") is located at an elevation of 1,409 metres. The municipality covers an area of 74.41 km^{2}, including the exclave of Dehesa de la Cepeda, a mostly pasture area geographically located between the provinces of Ávila and Segovia in the autonomous community of Castile and León.
