= Luis Ceballos y Fernández de Córdoba =

Spanish forest engineer and botanist

The Most Excellent Luis Ceballos
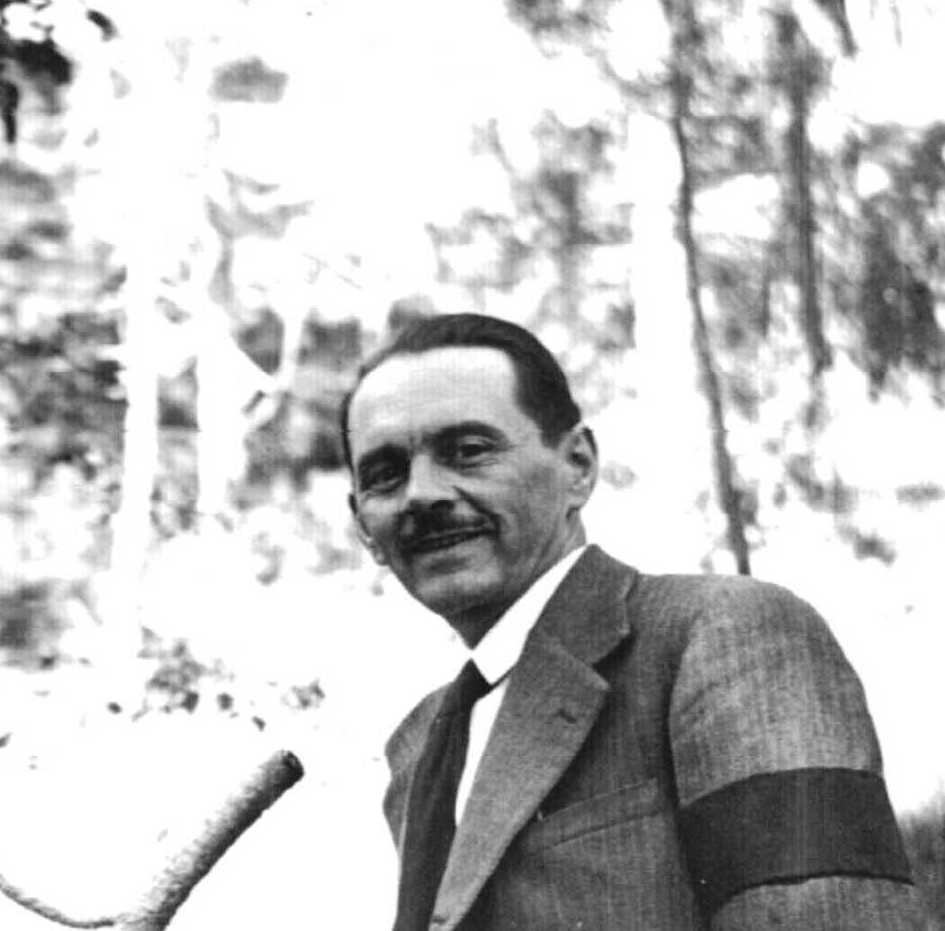
- Born: Luis Ceballos y Fernández de Córdoba; 31 July 1896; San Lorenzo de El Escorial, Spain
- Died: 26 September 1967 (aged 71); Madrid, Spain

Seat J of the Real Academia Española
- In office 12 December 1965 – 26 September 1967
- Preceded by: Julio Casares
- Succeeded by: Antonio Tovar

Luis Ceballos y Fernández de Córdoba (31 July 1896 in San Lorenzo de El Escorial – 26 September 1967) was a Spanish forest engineer and botanist. He was member of the Spanish Royal Academy of Sciences and the Royal Spanish Academy.

One of his major works was the General Plan of Reforestation of Spain, made in 1938, which is the foundation of a philosophy, ahead for the time, in which established the modern ecological basis for afforestation. But his great work, that had been long planned and organized, was the development of the first Forestal Map of Spain, which was introduced in June 1966.

His brother Gonzalo was an entomologist who specialised in Ichneumonidae.
