= Zarzalejo =

- Village
- Flag Coat of arms
- Interactive map of Zarzalejo
- Coordinates: 40°30′N 4°3′W
- Country: Spain
- Autonomous community: Community of Madrid

Government

Area
  - Land: 20.63 km^{2} (7.97 sq mi)
- Elevation: 1,104 m (3,622 ft)

Population (2025-01-01)
  - Total: 1,946
  - Density: 62.2/km^{2} (161/sq mi)
- Time zone: UTC+1 (CET)
  - Summer (DST): UTC+2 (CEST)
- Area code: 34 (Spain) +

Zarzalejo (Spanish pronunciation: [θaɾ.θa.ˈle.xo]) is a village in the Community of Madrid in Sierra Oeste, near El Escorial. It had 1,773 inhabitants in 2022.

An ancient farmstead dating from Roman times was found here. It was occupied in the second and third centuries AD.
